= List of The New Yorker contributors =

The New Yorker script in Irvin typeface

A list of current and past contributors to The New Yorker, along with the dates they were published and their primary areas of interest.

== A–Al ==
- Christoph Abbrederis – illustrator, 2010–2016
- Hanif Abdurraqib – critic, 2017, 2020–2021, 2023–2025
- Aria Aber – poet, 2019, 2021, 2023, 2025
- Nina Chanel Abney – cover artist, 2021
- Dan Abromowitz – illustrator, 2021
- Pat Achilles – cartoonist, 2021
- André Aciman – writer, 1997–2017
- Joan Acocella – cultural/dance critic, staff writer, 1993, 1995, 1998–2000, 2002–2023
- Marisa Acocella – see Marisa Acocella Marchetto
- Franklin P. Adams (pseudonym: F. P. A.) – writer, 1925–1939, 1942–1943, 1946–1949
- Jon Adams – cartoonist, 2017–2021
- Charles Addams – cartoonist, cover artist, illustrator, 1932–1988
- Chimamanda Ngozi Adichie – fiction, writer, 1997–2020
- Aravind Adiga – fiction writer, 2009
- Renata Adler – writer, 1962–1987
- Erik Agard – crosswords, 2021
- Michael Agger – editor, 2001–2023
- Julie Agoos – poet, 2015
- Matthieu Aikins – reporter, 2013–2016
- Kaveh Akbar – poet, 2017, 2019, 2021
- Sarah Akinterinwa – cartoonist, 2020–2023
- Alain – (pseudonym of artist Daniel Brustlein) – cartoonist, cover artist, 1933–1960
- Constantin Alajalov – cover artist, illustrator, 1926–1960
- Daniel Alarcón – journalist, 2021
- K. Albert – reporter, 1938
- Vince Aletti – photography critic, 2005–2016, 2021–2025
- Elizabeth Alexander – poet, 2015
- Meena Alexander – poet, 2018
- Sherman Alexie – short story writer, 1999–2013
- André Alexis – short story writer, 2022, 2024
- Henry Alford – humorist and reporter, 1998–2000, 2003, 2005, 2007, 2012–2024
- Rozina Ali – reporter, 2015–2016
- Emma Allen – writer and cartoon editor, 2012–2025
- Jenny Allen – humorist, 2008–2017
- Woody Allen – humorist, 1966–2013
- Kendra Allenby – cartoonist, 2017–2021, 2023–2024
- Sam Allingham – short story writer, 2018
- Hilton Als – essayist, theatre critic, staff writer, 1989–1991, 1994–2023
- Keith Althaus – poet, 1974
- Anna Altman – reporter, 2014
- Al Alvarez – writer
- Hala Alyan – poet, 2020–2021

== Am–Az ==
- Samuel Amadon – poet, 2011
- Pablo Amargo – illustrator, 2014–2021
- Yehuda Amichai – poet, 2013
- Martin Amis – short story writer, critic, 2002, 2015, 2022
- Megan Amram – humorist, 2014–2022
- Jon Lee Anderson – journalist, staff writer, 1998–2021
- Kelli Anderson – illustrator, 2015
- Alexander Andreades – cartoonist, 2021
- Michael Andreasen – short story writer, 2016
- Angelina (pseudonym) – writer, 1926
- Roger Angell – fiction editor, essayist and baseball writer, 1944–2019
- Donald Antrim – fiction writer, 1996–2015
- Judd Apatow – contributor, 2019
- Araminta (pseudonym) – reporter, 1925
- Evgenia Arbugaeva – photographer, 2014
- Diane Arbus – photographer, 2016
- Hannah Arendt – journalist, political scientist, 1963–1975
- Michael J. Arlen – television critic and staff writer, 1957–1990
- Rae Armantrout – poet, 2006, 2008–2013, 2015–2024
- Simon Armitage – poet, 2017
- Richard Armour – poet, 1950
- Jackson Arn – art critic, 2023–2025
- Ed Arno – cartoonist
- Peter Arno – cartoonist, cover artist, 1925–1968, 2019
- Andrea Arroyo – cover artist, 1992–1993
- José Arroyo – cartoonist, 2020, 2024
- Nick Arvin – writer, 2005
- Natalie Ascencios – illustrator, 1994–2000
- Lila Ash – cartoonist, 2019–2022
- John Ashbery – poet, 2014
- Juan Astasio – cartoonist, 2020–2021
- Margaret Atwood – fiction writer, 1990–2021
- Audax Minor (pseudonym of George F. T. Ryall) – horseracing reporter, 1926–1978
- Ken Auletta – critic, staff writer, Annals of Communication columnist, 1977–2014
- Richard Avedon – staff photographer
- Joana Avillez – illustrator, 2021
- Rachel Aviv – staff writer, 2011–2024
- François Avril – illustrator, 2015
- Jordan Awan – illustrator, 2013, 2017
- Michael Azerrad – journalist, 2021
- Negar Azimi – reporter, 2014–2016

== B–Bi ==
- A. B. (pseudonym) – reporter, 1925
- H. L. B. (pseudonym) – reporter, 1925
- Andy Babbitz – cartoonist, 2022–2023
- Katia Bachko – reporter, 2009–2019
- Nicholson Baker – reporter and short story writer, 1981–2015
- Roger Ballen – photographer, 2013
- Whitney Balliett – jazz critic and book reviewer, 1952–2001
- Taneum Bambrick – poet, 2020
- Bamby (pseudonym) – writer, 1925
- Mary Jo Bang – poet, 2013–2017
- Istvan Banyai – illustrator, 1998–2014
- Sarula Bao – cover artist, 2023
- Stanisław Barańczak – poet, 2015
- Alex Barasch – reporter, 2019–2024
- Shauna Barbosa – poet, 2020
- Perry Barlow – cartoonist, cover artist, 1930–1974
- Djuna Barnes – writer, 1969–1972
- Julian Barnes – correspondent/commentator, Britain/Europe
- Becky Barnicoat – illustrator, 2021–2022
- Martin Baron – fact–checker, 1974–2010
- Alex Barron – reporter, 2022
- Kevin Barry – short story writer, 2010–2016
- Amos Barshad – writer, 2018
- Charles Barsotti – cartoonist, 1974, 1977–2021
- Donald Barthelme – short story writer
- Jeffrey Bartholet – reporter, 2013
- Zachary Bartholet – comedian, 2017
- Mat Barton – cartoonist, 2021
- Ralph Barton (pseudonym: R. B.) – artist, humorist, 1925
- Charles Baskerville (pseudonyms: Tophat; Top Hat) – illustrator and reporter, 1925
- Ellen Bass – poet, 2013–2017, 2019, 2021–2022, 2024
- Igor Bastidas – illustrator, 2020–2021
- G. [E.] Bates – poet, 1926, 1951
- Gabrielle Bates – poet, 2021
- Al Batt – illustrator, 2021
- Carrie Battan – staff writer, 2015–2022
- Tom Batten – writer
- Elif Batuman – writer, 2006, 2010–2022
- Dan Baum – writer, 2003–2006
- Noah Baumbach – humorist, 1999–2019
- Glen Baxter – cartoonist, 1988–2024
- Christopher Beam – reporter, 2014
- Beans (pseudonym) – reporter, 1925
- Mary Beard – critic, 2023
- Kate Beaton – cartoonist, 2010–2021
- Ann Beattie – short story writer, 1974–2015
- Alison Bechdel – cartoonist, 2016
- Julie Belcove – reporter, 2016
- Dianne Belfrey – writer, 2016
- Erin Belieu – poet, 2013
- Darrin Bell – illustrator, 2016
- Josh Bell – poet, 2015
- Saul Bellow – writer (fiction and non-fiction), 2010
- Ludwig Bemelmans – artist, cover artist, writer
- Nathaniel Benchley – writer, 1950
- Robert Benchley (pseudonym: Guy Fawkes) – humorist and theatre critic, 1925–1940, 1956, 1993–1994
- Claire-Louise Bennett – fiction, 2022
- Sally Benson – fiction
- Charles Berberian – illustrator, 1993–2006
- Meyer Berger – reporter, 1938
- Emily Bernstein – cartoonist, 2024
- Oren Bernstein – cartoonist, 2023
- Patrick Berry – crosswords, 1997–1999, 2018–2023
- John Berryman – poet, 2025
- Charles Bethea – reporter, staff writer, 2008, 2015–2023, 2025
- Marshall D. Beuick – writer, 1925
- Mark Bibbins – poet, 2014
- Michael Biddle – illustrator, 1974
- Joanna Biggs – critic, 2014, 2017–2019, 2023
- Burkhard Bilger – staff writer, 2000–2014, 2016–2020, 2023–2025
- Guy Billout – illustrator, 1993–2014
- Kenneth Bird (pseudonym: Fougasse) – cartoonist, 1925
- Lisa Birnbach – humorist, 2002–2014
- Abe Birnbaum – illustrator
- Elizabeth Bishop – poet, essayist
- Morris Bishop – poet and humorist, 1930–1960
- Tom Bissell – journalist, 2008

== Bl–By ==
- Ellie Black – cartoonist, 2019–2023, 2025
- George Black – journalist, 2014, 2016
- Michael Ian Black – humorist, 2021
- Sophie Cabot Black – poet, 2017–2022
- Rose Blake – illustrator, 2014
- Richard Blanco – poet, 2019
- Matt Blease – illustrator, 2021–2022
- R. O. Blechman – cartoonist, 2019
- Harry Bliss – cartoonist, cover artist, 1998–2022, 2024
- T. H. Bliss (pseudonyms: T. H. B., Tip Bliss) – reporter, 1925
- Barry Blitt – cover artist, illustrator, 1992?–1994, 1998–2000, 2009–2025
- Jonathan Blitzer – reporter, staff writer, 2014–2022
- Naomi Bliven – reviewer, 1985
- Bertram Bloch (pseudonym: B. B.) – writer, 1925
- Chana Bloch – poet, 2017
- Serge Bloch – illustrator, 2019
- Sidney Blumenthal – editorialist
- Robert Bly – poet, 2010
- Maxwell Bodenheim – writer, 1926
- Louise Bogan – poet, 194?
- Paula Bohince – poet, 2013
- Eavan Boland – poet, 2014
- Roberto Bolaño – fiction, 2005–2013
- Yves Bonnefoy – poet, 1985
- George Booth – cartoonist, cover artist, 1969–2022
- Ian Boothby – cartoonist, 2019–2025
- David Borchart – cartoonist, 2013–2024
- Camille Bordas – short story writer, 2017–2019
- Douglas Borgstedt – cartoonist, 1930s
- Matilda Borgström – cartoonist, 2021
- Andy Borowitz – humorist
- Marianne Boruch – poet, 1989, 2010, 2014, 2016, 2019, 2022, 2024
- Gardner Botsford – writer, 1942, editor, 1945–1982, occasional contributor, 1982–1998
- David Bottoms – poet, 2013
- Anthony Bourdain – writer, 2000–2021
- Brooke Bourgeois – cartoonist, 2020–2021, 2023
- Jane Boutwell – staff writer, 1985
- Peter J. Boyer – reporter, 2001
- Kay Boyle – reporter, fiction writer, 1931–1942, 1946–1950
- T. Coraghessan Boyle – short story writer, 1995–2021
- Conor Bracken – poet, 2017
- Charles Brackett – theatre critic, 1930
- Ray Bradbury – writer, 1947
- Alyssa Brandt – humorist, 2023
- Sarah Braunstein – short story writer, 2013–2015
- Ivan Brávo – illustrator, 2020, 2023, 2025
- Jacob Breckenridge – cartoonist, 2021
- Maeve Brennan – essayist/short story writer
- Yoni Brenner – humorist, 2007–2017
- Sophie Brickman – writer, 2013–2014
- Brady Brickner-Wood — writer, 2024–2026
- Lucie Brock–Broido – poet, 2013
- Paul Brodeur – environmental health investigative science exposé writer, ~1960–1990
- Harold Brodkey – novelist/essay writer, 1930–1996
- Steve Brodner – illustrator, 1993–2010
- Joseph Brodsky – poet, 1976–2013
- Richard Brody – writer and film critic, 2000, 2005–2025
- Richard Brookhiser – staff writer, 1988–1993
- John Brooks – writer, critic, 1950, 1985
- Chip Brown – reporter, 1993–2001
- Harry Brown – poet
- Tina Brown – editor, 1992–1998
- Howard Brubaker – columnist, 1925–1927, 1938, 1940, 1946, 1950
- Connie Bruck – staff writer, 1989–2012, 2014–2019, 2021
- Julie Bruck – poet, 1990–2011
- E. J. Bruen – poet, 1925
- Ivan Brunetti – cover artist, 2007–2014
- Christopher Buckley – writer
- Bill Buford – food writer, 1974–
- Alan Burdick – staff writer, 2012–2016
- Thomas Burke – writer, 1925
- Nathan Burstein – critic, editor, 2014, 2021–2024
- Stephanie Burt aka Stephen Burt – poet, 2012–2017, 2019–2023
- Ian Buruma – critic, historian, 1992–2018
- Busybody (pseudonym) – writer, 1925
- Lila Byock – reporter, 2010
- Pat Byrnes – cartoonist, 2010–2019, 2021, 2023

== C–Ci ==
- C. C. (pseudonym) – humorist, 1925
- K. C. (pseudonym) – writer, 1925
- N. C. (pseudonym) – writer, 1925
- W. B. C. (pseudonym) – writer, 1925
- Ed Caesar – journalist, staff writer, 2015–2023
- Agnes Callard – writer, 2020–2021, 2023
- Italo Calvino – fiction writer, 1983–2017
- Peter Cameron – short story writer, 1985–
- E. Simms Campbell – cartoonist
- Hilary Fitzgerald Campbell – cartoonist, 2020–2021, 2023
- Michael Campbell
- Pascal Campion – cover artist, 2019–2021
- Harkaitz Cano — poet, 2022
- Hallie Cantor – humorist, 2014–2018
- Francisco Cantú – critic, 2021
- Kevin Canty – fiction writer, 1997–2014
- Lincoln Caplan – staff writer, 1985
- Rebecca Caplan – humorist, 2017
- Truman Capote – writer
- Leo Carey – reporter, food critic, 2002–2014
- Robert Caro – writer, editor, 1974–2019
- Alex Carp – reporter, 2023
- Chelsea Carr – cartoonist, 2021
- James Carroll – journalist and historian, 1996–
- Anne Carson – poet, 2013–2017
- Rachel Carson – writer and environmentalist
- Henri Cartier-Bresson – photographer, 2023
- Raymond Carver – fiction writer
- Caitlin Cass – illustrator, 2020–2021
- John Cassidy – staff writer, 1995–2019
- Daniele Castellano – illustrator, 2022
- Chris Cater – illustrator, 2014–2016
- Catherine Caufield – writer, 1985
- Casey Cep – staff writer, 2013–2016, 2018–2023
- Michael Cera – humorist, 2013
- Oscar Cesare – cartoonist, 1925
- Michael Chabon – fiction writer, 1987–2019
- Alejandro Chacoff – critic, 2021
- Alexander Chancellor – editor, 1993
- Anjali Chandrashekar – cartoonist, 2023
- Justin Chang – film critic, 2024–2025
- Arthur Chapman – humorist, 1925
- Cannaday Chapman – cover artist, 2017, 2022
- Mario Chard – poet, 2016
- Roz Chast – cover artist, staff cartoonist, 1978–2025
- Kyle Chayka – staff writer, 2022, 2024
- John Cheever – short story writer, 1931–1981
- Adrian Chen – staff writer, 2014–2017
- Ingfei Chen – writer, 2022
- Tom Cheney – cartoonist, 2010–2021
- Alice Cheng – illustrator, 2017
- Dan Chiasson – poet and critic, 2000–2021
- Tom Chitty – cartoonist, 2014–2019, 2021–2024
- Susan Choi – short story writer, 2020
- Nishant Choksi – illustrator, 2013–2017, 2024
- Isaac Chotiner – staff writer, 2019
- Heather Christle – poet, 2019
- Amanda Chung – cartoonist, 2024
- Laurent Cilluffo – illustrator, 1994–2013
- Sandra Cisneros – poet, 2020, 2022

== Cl–Cu ==
- Greg Clarke – cartoonist, 2021
- Daniel Clowes – cartoonist, 2010–2016
- Robert M. Coates – art critic, 1947–1950
- Ta-Nehisi Coates – writer, 2009–2019
- Jelani Cobb – staff writer, 2012–2026
- Sam Cobean – cartoonist
- Vincent Coca – illustrator, 2022
- J. M. Coetzee – short story writer, 2005–2017
- Andrea Cohen – poet, 2014–2017, 2022
- Leonard Cohen – poet, 2016
- John Colapinto – staff writer, 1989–
- McAlister Coleman – writer, 1925
- Steve Coll – writer, 2005–2022
- John Collier – short story writer, 1933–1934, 1937–1942, 1951, 1955–1956, 1958
- Nate Collier – cartoonist, 1925
- Patricia Collinge – writer, 1925–1926
- Billy Collins – poet, 2013–2019, 2021
- James Collins – reporter, 2013
- Lauren Collins – staff writer and editor, 2004–2023
- Jorge Colombo – cover artist, 2013–2015, 2021
- Con Brio (pseudonym) – music critic, 1925
- Marc Connelly – advisory editor, 1925
- Charles Cooke – reporter, 1938
- Peter Cooley – poet, 2013
- Adam Cooper – cartoonist, 2021
- Becky Cooper – reviewer, 2015–2017
- Henry S. F. Cooper Jr. – staff writer
- Nathan Cooper – cartoonist, 2024–2025
- Robert Coover – short story writer, 2011–2015
- Rachel Corbett – reporter, 2017
- Karla Cornejo Villavicencio – writer, 2021
- Golden Cosmos – illustrator, 2013–2022
- Frank Cotham – cartoonist, 2001–2024
- William Cotton – illustrator, cover artist
- Miguel Covarrubias – cartoonist, 1925
- Bizzy Coy – cartoonist, 2024
- Craig & Karl – illustrators, 2018
- Jimmy Craig – cartoonist, 2023–2024
- Caleb Crain – critic, 2005–2016
- Brent Crane – journalist, 2019–2020
- Elizabeth Ada Crawford – promotions staff, 1920s–1930
- Michael Crawford – cartoonist, 2010–2021, 2024
- Sean Crespo – cartoonist, 2023
- Arlene Croce – dance critic, 1973–1998
- Tristan Crocker – cartoonist, 2023
- Herbert Crooker – writer, 1925
- Ian Crouch – writer
- Charles Patrick Crow – editor
- Evelyn Miller Crowell – writer, 1938
- Robert Crumb – cartoonist
- Elizabeth Cullinan – fiction, 1960–1981
- Leo Cullum – cartoonist, 1977–2010, 2019
- John Cuneo – cover artist, illustrator, 1994, 2013–2022, 2024
- Vinson Cunningham – staff writer, theatre critic, 2015–2025
- Will Cuppy – humorist
- Kate Curtis – illustrator, 2016–2017, 2021
- Rebecca Curtis – fiction, 2004–2021

== D–E ==
- Van D. (pseudonym) – writer, 1925
- Tadeusz Dąbrowski – poet, 2014
- Roald Dahl – short story writer
- Maddie Dai – cartoonist, 2017–2021, 2023
- William Dalrymple – critic, 2015
- Mark Danner – foreign affairs correspondent
- Edwidge Danticat – short story writer, 1999–
- Kamel Daoud – short story writer, 2015
- Whitney Darrow Jr. – cartoonist, 1933–1982
- D.A.Gordon Dart – illustrator, 1975–1988
- Joe Dator – cartoonist 2006–2021
- Marlene L. Daut – historian, 2023
- Larry David – humorist, 2011, 2018–2019, 2021, 2025
- Adam Davidson – staff writer, 2016–2017
- Amy Davidson – see Amy Davidson Sorkin
- Matthew Stiles Davis – illustrator, 2015
- Phillip Day – cartoonist, 2021–2022
- Robert Day – cartoonist, cover artist, 1931–1976, 2021
- Tyree Daye – poet, 2021
- Katharine Dayton – poet, 1925
- Julian de Miskey – illustrator, cover artist, 1925
- Victor de Pauw – illustrator
- Olivia de Recat – cartoonist, 2017–2020, 2023
- Peter de Sève – cover artist, illustrator, 2013–2021
- Peter De Vries – humorist, 1944–1987
- Richard Decker – cartoonist
- Eldon Dedini – cartoonist
- Jonathan Dee – critic, 2018–2021, 2023
- Paul Degen – illustrator
- D'Egville – cartoonist, 1925
- Don DeLillo – fiction writer, 2016
- Glauco Della Sciucca – illustrator
- Matt Dellinger – reporter, 2000–2010
- Kim DeMarco – illustrator, cover artist, 1996–2021
- David Denby – film critic, staff writer, 1998–2019
- Jeremy Denk – music writer, 2012–2013
- Ben Denzer – illustrator, 2024
- Drew Dernavich – cartoonist, 2010–2024
- Toi Derricotte – poet, 2013
- Kiran Desai – novelist
- Diane di Prima – poet, 2020, 2023
- Selma Diamond – humorist, cartoonist
- Matthew Dickman – poet, 2010–2018
- Michael Dickman – poet, 2013–2019
- Joan Didion – essayist, 1988–2000, 2021
- Matthew Diffee – cartoonist, 2010–2019, 2021, 2023
- Alex Dimitrov – poet, 2018, 2020–2022
- Johnny DiNapoli – cartoonist, 2019–2021, 2023–2025
- Bruce Diones – critic, 1990–2019
- Mason Dixon (pseudonym) – reporter, 1925
- E. L. Doctorow – fiction writer, 1995–2010
- Maggie Doherty – writer, 2022
- Liza Donnelly – cartoonist, 1979–2021, 2023
- Timothy Donnelly – poet, 2014, 2016–2017, 2019, 2022–2023
- John Donohue – reporter, 2001–2017
- Joseph Dottino – cartoonist, 2021, 2024–2025
- Mark Doty – poet, 2015
- Harry Este Dounce (pseudonym: Touchstone; H. D.?) – critic, 1925–1926
- Leonard Dove – cover artist, illustrator, 1928
- Rita Dove – poet, 1994, 1996, 1999, 2003–2004, 2008, 2012, 2016, 2019–2022
- Nick Downes – cartoonist, 2014–2019, 2023
- Fairfax Downey (pseudonym: F. D.) – writer, 1925
- Larry Doyle – humorist, 1990, 1993–1994, 1999, 2003, 2005–2010, 2012, 2019, 2021–2022
- Roddy Doyle – short story writer, 1996–2014
- Robert Draper – reporter, 2016
- Elizabeth Drew – journalist
- Eli Dreyfus – illustrator, 2021
- Nick Drnaso – illustrator, 2020
- Eric Drooker – illustrator, cover artist, 2013–2017
- Andre Dubus – short story writer, 1969–1998
- J. C. Duffy – cartoonist, 2010–2021
- Pari Dukovic – staff photographer, 2015, 2023
- Lena Dunham – writer, 2012–2017
- Cirocco Dunlap – humorist, 2014–2016
- Fuchsia Dunlop – food writer, 2008
- Stephen Dunn – poet, 2014–2015
- Natalie Dupille – cartoonist, 2021
- Aurélia Durand – illustrator, 2021
- Caroline Dworin – illustrator, 2022
- Thomas Dworzak - photographer, 2001–2005
- Geoff Dyer – journalist, 2011–2015
- C. B. E. (pseudonym) – humorist, 1925
- EE (pseudonym) – poet, 1925
- Cornelius Eady – poet, 2010–2020
- Emily Eakin – editor, writer, 2011–2015
- Tony Earley – short story writer, 1998
- Bob Eckstein – illustrator, 2013–2016
- Irwin Edman – philosopher, poet
- Dave Eggers – writer, 2015
- Ivan Ehlers – cartoonist, 2023, 2026
- Edna Eicke – cover artist, illustrator, 1945–1961
- Deborah Eisenberg – fiction writer, 1985
- Jesse Eisenberg – humorist, 2013–2017
- Diana Ejaita – cover artist, 2019–2021
- Morgan Elliott – illustrator, 2014
- H. F. Ellis – essayist, 1985
- Helen Ellis – writer, 2023
- Claudia Emerson – poet, 2013
- John C. Emery – writer, 1925
- Merve Emre – contributing writer, critic, 2017, 2020–2023
- Katie Engelhart – reporter, 2021
- Nathan Englander – short story writer, 2010
- Anne Enright – short story writer, 2017
- Mariana Enríquez – fiction, 2016, 2020, 2023
- Adam Entous – staff writer, 2018–2022
- Nora Ephron – writer, 2002, 2021
- Joseph Epstein – writer and essayist
- Louise Erdrich – fiction writer, 1989–2015
- Jacob Escobedo – illustrator, 2013
- Marc Philippe Eskenazi – illustrator, humorist, 2013–2014
- The Eskimo (pseudonym) – writer, 1925
- Jeffrey Eugenides – writer, 1996–2018

== Fa–Fl ==
- Clifton Fadiman – book reviewer
- James Fallows – journalist
- Susan Faludi – reporter, 1994–2013
- Jiayang Fan – staff writer, 2010, 2012–2023
- Nuruddin Farah – fiction, 2001–2014
- Mitra Farmand – cartoonist, 2015–2019
- Joseph Farris – cartoonist, 1957–2010
- Ronan Farrow – reporter, writer, 2017–2025
- Johanna Fateman – reporter, 2018–2023
- Malika Favre – cover artist, illustrator, 2016–2023
- Glynnis Fawkes – cartoonist, 2023
- João Fazenda – illustrator, 2019
- Lizzie Feidelson – writer, 2020
- Jules Feiffer – cartoonist
- Camonghne Felix – poet, 2022
- Heinz Insu Fenkl – fiction, 2015
- Edna Ferber – writer, 1925
- Ada Ferrer – writer, 2021
- Joshua Ferris – fiction writer, 2007–2014
- Tadgh Ferry – cartoonist, 2020, 2023
- Tina Fey – writer, 2011
- Jay Fielden – editor, poet, 1995–2024
- Dexter Filkins – staff writer, 2011–2026
- Liana Finck – cartoonist, 2013–2025
- William Finnegan – staff writer, 1984, 1987–2024
- Molly Fischer – reporter, 2015
- Rob Fischer – reporter, 2013–2014
- Jamie Fisher – reporter, 2021
- Jeffrey Fisher – illustrator, 2017
- Marc Fisher – journalist, 2006–2013
- M. F. K. Fisher – fiction, food writer, 1964–1983, 2021
- Joseph Fulling Fishman – writer, 1925, 1930
- Ali Fitzgerald – comic artist
- F. Scott Fitzgerald – fiction writer, 1929, 2017
- Frances FitzGerald – journalist
- Jameson Fitzpatrick – poet, 2022
- Anne Fizzard – cartoonist, 2021
- Emily Flake – cartoonist, 2013–2022, 2024
- Janet Flanner (pseudonym: Genêt) – journalist, 1925–1975, 1994, 2000
- Raoul Fleischmann – benefactor, patron, sponsor, 1925–1952
- Seth Fleishman – cartoonist, 2016–2021, 2023–2024
- Clo'e Floirat – illustrator, 2022
- Ebony Flowers – cartoonist, 2019
- Gillian Flynn – writer, 2016
- Nick Flynn – poet, 2013

== Fo–Fz ==
- Jonathan Safran Foer – fiction writer
- Tyler Foggatt – reporter, 2018–2019
- Jean–Michel Folon – illustrator
- A. H. Folwell (pseudonym: A. H. F.) – poet, reporter, 1925
- Carolyn Forché – poet, 2010
- Corey Ford – writer, 1925–1926
- Katie Ford – poet, 2013
- Carl Fornaro – cover artist, 1925
- Ryan Fox – poet, 2017
- Dana Fradon – cartoonist, 1974, 1986
- Janet Frame – fiction, 2010
- André François – cartoonist
- Waldo Frank (pseudonym: Search–Light) – writer, 1925
- Nancy Franklin – television critic, 1998–2011, 2022
- Ruth Franklin – critic, 2021
- Jonathan Franzen – writer, 1994–2016
- Edward Frascino – illustrator, 1998–2019
- Gregory Fraser – poet, 2019
- Kennedy Fraser – fashion critic, 1970–1986
- Kit Fraser – cartoonist, 2023
- Cora Frazier – humorist, 2012–2025
- Ian Frazier – staff writer, 1974–2024
- John Freeman – poet, 2012
- Sasha Frere-Jones – pop music critic, 2004–2016
- Esther Freud – fiction writer, 2021
- Andy Friedman – illustrator, cartoonist, 1996–2024
- Jena Friedman – humorist, 2017, 2020–2021
- Tad Friend – staff writer, 1987–2021
- Filip Fröhlich – illustrator, 2020
- Alfred Frueh – cartoonist, 1925–1962
- Hannah Fry – critic, 2019–2021
- Naomi Fry – staff writer, 2014, 2016–2023
- Alice Fulton – poet, 1985–2013
- Tom Funk – illustrator, 1974
- Laura Furman – fiction writer, 1985–
- Steve Futterman – reporter, 2007–2012, 2018–2023

== Ga–Go ==
- Gilbert W. Gabriel (pseudonym: Golly–Wogg) – writer, 1925
- Mary Gaitskill – fiction writer, 1995–2023
- Jonathan Galassi – poet, 2017
- Rivka Galchen – short story writer and reporter, 2008–2022
- Felipe Galindo aka "Feggo" – cartoonist, 2002–2023
- Mavis Gallant – short story writer, 1951–2012
- Sergio García Sánchez – cover artist, 2021–2024
- Balazs Gardi – photographer, 2021
- Leo Garel – illustrator
- Ina Garten – contributor, 2019
- Frank X. Gaspar – poet, 2023
- Henry Louis Gates Jr. – culture critic, essayist, 1993–2011
- Tom Gauld – cover artist, 2013–2021
- Atul Gawande – staff writer, 1998–2021
- Marella Gayla – reporter, 2020–2021
- Veronica Geng – humorist, editor, 1976–1992, 2019
- Michael Gerber – parodist, humorist
- Mort Gerberg – cartoonist, 1969–2019, 2021
- Jeannie Suk Gersen – writer, 2022–2023
- Keith Gessen – critic, 2010–2017, 2022
- Masha Gessen – staff writer, 2014–2022
- Arthur Getz – illustrator, 1938–1988
- Tavi Gevinson – contributor, 2019
- Wolcott Gibbs – parodist, humorist, reviewer, and fiction writer, 1927–1958, 1993
- Wolcott Gibbs, Jr. – editor, 1980s
- David Gilbert – fiction writer, 1996, 2013–
- Brendan Gill – writer, theatre critic, 1936–1998
- Penelope Gilliatt – film critic, 1968–1979
- Giovanni Giudici – poet, 2017
- Malcolm Gladwell – staff writer, 2000–2016
- Susan B. Glasser – staff writer, 2017–2018
- E. S. Glenn – cartoonist, 2020–2023
- Louise Glück – poet, 2013
- Ambrose Glutz (pseudonym?) – writer, 1925
- Jeffrey Goldberg – journalist, 2001–2010
- Michelle Goldberg – writer, 2014–2015
- Paul Goldberger – architecture critic, 1997–2010
- Hannah Goldfield – food critic, 2010–2015, 2017–2025
- Stuart Goldman – journalist
- Jennifer Gonnerman – staff writer, 2015–2022
- Elisa Gonzalez – poet, 2016–2017, 2019–2022
- Allegra Goodman – fiction writer, 1994, 2005, 2010, 2021
- Carter Goodrich – cover artist, 2015–2017
- Dana Goodyear – staff writer, poet, 2000–2023
- Anand Gopal – reporter, 2020–2021
- Adam Gopnik – staff writer, critic, 1984, 1986–2024
- Nadine Gordimer – writer, 1951–2013
- Witold Gordon – illustrator
- Edward Gorey – illustrator, 1992
- Elizabeth C. Gorski – crosswords, 2018–2026
- Robert Gottlieb – editor, writer, 1987–
- Philip Gourevitch – staff writer, 1995–2017

== Gr–Gz ==
- Michael Grabell – reporter, 2017
- Kathleen Graber – poet, 2010
- Jorie Graham – poet, 1987, 1989, 1992–1993, 1995, 1997, 2001, 2005, 2007, 2010–2011, 2014, 2016–2017, 2019–2023
- Eliza Gran – illustrator 1994–2000
- David Grann – staff writer, 2003–2023
- Anita Grannis – poet, 1925
- Jane Grant – co–founder, consultant & writer, 1925–1945
- Robert Graves – poet, 1950
- Amelia Gray – fiction writer, 2015
- Adam Green – writer, 1993–
- Emma Green – staff writer, 2022–2025
- Jessica Greenbaum – poet, 2014
- Gary Greenberg – health writer, 2001–2018
- Stephen Greenblatt – critic, 1993–2018
- Dan Greene – writer, 2021–2025
- Ben Greenman – writer and editor, 2000–2014
- Garth Greenwell – critic and short story writer, 2015–2017
- Andrew Sean Greer – fiction writer, 2004–2017
- Linda Gregerson – poet, 2010, 2014, 2019, 2021
- Linda Gregg – poet
- Alex Gregory – illustrator, 2010–2018
- Alice Gregory – writer, 2015
- Kia Gregory – reporter, 2016
- Eamon Grennan – poet, 1985
- Rachel Eliza Griffiths – poet, 2019
- Marylen Grigas – poet, 2019
- Mary Grimm – short story writer, 1986–1990, 1998, 2019, 2024
- Eliza Griswold – journalist, writer, 2003–2021
- Eli Grober – humorist, 2016–2017, 2019–2023, 2025
- Lauren Groff – short story writer, 2011–2022
- Jerome Groopman – staff writer, 1997–2022, 2024
- Sam Gross – cartoonist, 1995–2022, 2024
- Terry Gross – contributor, 2019
- Pia Guerra – cartoonist, 2018–2025
- Alma Guillermoprieto – journalist
- Hugo Guinness -- illustrator
- Arthur Guiterman – poet, 1925
- Romesh Gunesekera – short story writer, 2013
- Broti Gupta – humorist, 2017
- Chris Gural – cartoonist, 2024
- Luci Gutiérrez – cover artist, illustrator, 2013–2023
- Gyp (pseudonym) – writer, 1925

== H–He ==
- M. H. (pseudonym) – reporter, 1925
- R. V. H. (pseudonym) – humorist, 1925
- W. G. H. (pseudonym) – humorist, 1925
- Charlie Haas – humorist, 2010
- Lidija Haas – critic, 2019
- Rachel Hadas – poet, 2016–2019
- Tessa Hadley – short story writer, 2002–2021
- William Haefeli – cartoonist, 1998–2022
- Kaamran Hafeez – cartoonist, 2013–2017, 2021–2023
- Emily Hahn – journalist, 1938
- Wayne G. Haisley – writer, 1925
- Alex Halberstadt – journalist, 2013–2014
- Robert Hale – writer, 1925
- Macy Halford – writer, 2008–2014
- Leonard Hall – writer, 1925
- Marcellus Hall – illustrator, cover artist 1994–2024
- Jake Halpern – reporter, 2017
- Sue Halpern – staff writer, 2005–2022
- Philip Hamburger – theatre, television and music critic
- Barbara Hamby – poet, 2016, 2022
- Mohsin Hamid – fiction, 2022
- Gabrielle Hamilton – cooking, 2004–2013
- Tim Hamilton – cartoonist, 2016, 2021–2022
- William Hamilton – cartoonist, 1965–2014, 2016
- Andrew Hamm – illustrator, 2020
- Jon Hamm – contributor, 2019
- Joshua Hammer – writer, 2010
- Dashiell Hammett – short story writer, 2013
- Han Kang – fiction, 2023
- Han Zhang – reporter, 2018–2019
- J. B. Handelsman – cartoonist, 1986
- Jack Handey – humorist, 1987–2018, 2022
- Bruce Handy – reporter, 1998, 2013–2014, 2016–2023
- Frank Hanely – cartoonist, 1925
- Charlie Hankin – cartoonist, 2013–2021, 2023
- Tom Hanks – 'fiction writer'
- Charlie Hankin – illustrator, 2015–2016, 2020
- Suzy Hansen – writer, 2023
- Tomer Hanuka – cover artist, 2014, 2017
- Lis Harris – journalist
- Sidney Harris – cartoonist, 2021
- Elizabeth Harrower – fiction writer, 2015
- Marina Harss – reporter, 2009, 2012–2025
- Cameron Harvey – illustrator, 2015
- Giles Harvey – writer, 2011–2013, 2016, 2020–2021, 2023
- Eric S. Hatch – writer, 1925–ca. 1950?
- Leonard Hatch (pseudonym: L.H.) – humorist, 1925
- Jessamyn Hatcher – writer, 2015
- Theodore Haupt – (as I.G. Haupt) cover artist, illustrator, 1927–1933
- Micah Hauser – reporter, 2019–2021, 2023
- Heather Havrilesky – humorist, 2015
- Terrance Hayes – poet, 2016–2021
- Will Hay(e)s Jr. (pseudonym?) – film critic, 1925
- Grace Lynne Haynes – cover artist, 2020
- Seamus Heaney – poet, 1971–2016
- Ben Hecht – writer, 1925
- Monica Heisey – humorist, 2015
- Wilmot Emerton Heitland – cartoonist, 1925
- Nanna Heitmann – photographer, 2022
- John Held Jr. – cartoonist, illustrator, 1925–1932
- Zach Helfand – staff writer, 2018–2025
- Nathan Heller – staff writer, 2011–2023
- Geoffrey T. Hellman – Talk of the Town reporter, writer, 1929–1977
- Mark Helprin – novelist and essayist
- Nat Hentoff – staff writer, 1959–1990, 2022
- Juan Felipe Herrera – poet, 2020
- John Hersey – journalist, 1944–1988
- John Hersey (artist) – illustrator, 2021
- Seymour Hersh – reporter, 1971–2015
- Hendrik Hertzberg – editorialist, 1969–1977, 1986, 1992–2015, 2022
- Peter Hessler – staff writer, 2000–2025
- Sheila Heti – short story writer, 2015
- Anna Heyward – reporter, 2016

== Hi–Hy ==
- Bob Hicok – poet, 2017, 2020
- Adam Higginbotham – writer, 2013
- Roland High – cartoonist, 2022–2024
- Patricia Highsmith – writer, 2021
- John Chapman Hilder – humorist, 1925
- W. E. Hill (pseudonym: W. E. H.) – illustrator and reporter, 1925
- Jane Hirshfield – poet, 2015–2021
- Tony Hiss – staff writer, 1974
- Antonia Hitchens – editor, reporter, 2021–2023
- Zoë Hitzig – poet, 2017
- Tony Hoagland – poet, 2015
- David Hockney– cover artist, 2010–2011, 2018, 2020
- Trevor Hoey – cartoonist, 2024
- H. O. Hofman – cover artist, 1925–1927
- Helen E. Hokinson – cartoonist, cover artist, 1925–c.1949, 2019
- JM Holmes – fiction writer, 2021
- Sarah Holland-Batt – poet, 2015, 2018, 2021
- Jason Holley – illustrator, 2016
- Pete Holmes – cartoonist, 2007–2019
- Sterling HolyWhiteMountain – fiction writer, 2021–2023
- Jennifer Homans – dance critic, 2019–2023
- Leise Hook – cartoonist, 2021
- Ellison Hoover – cartoonist, 1925
- Nick Hornby – pop music critic
- Madeline (Mads) Horwath – cartoonist, 2020–2022
- Oscar Howard – cartoonist, 1925
- Marie Howe – poet, 2008, 2023
- Kelsey Howison – reporter, 1925
- Hua Hsu – staff writer, 2014–2023
- Lynn Hsu – cartoonist, 2022–2025
- Yinfan Huang – cartoonist, 2020, 2021–2022, 2024
- Ernest F. Hubbard – writer, 1925
- Albert Hubbell – artist (cover and spot), editor, writer(Stories and Briefly Noted – Nonfiction)
- Sue Hubbell – writer
- Antony Huchette – illustrator, 2016–2019, 2023
- T. R. Hummer – poet, 2015–2022
- Emma Hunsinger – cartoonist, 2017–2019
- Stan Hunt – cartoonist, 1974
- Jack Hunter – illustrator, 2013
- Charlayne Hunter-Gault – journalist, 1965–2020
- Sam Hurt – cartoonist, 2021–2023
- Brooke Husic – crosswords, 2022
- Matthew Hutson – writer, 2013, 2020–2025
- Terry Hutt – writer, 1925
- Sarah Hutto – humorist, 2017
- Amy Hwang – cartoonist, 2009–2024
- Wil S. Hylton – journalist, 2015
- Eleanor Hyde – fiction writer
- Fillmore Hyde – fiction writer, poet, 1926–1933
- Annie Hylton – reporter, 2022
- Stanley Edgar Hyman – literary critic

== I–J ==
- H. I. (pseudonym) – writer, 1925
- Janne Iivonen – illustrator, 2018
- Ralph Ingersoll – managing editor, 1925–1930
- Julia Ioffe – reporter, 2005–2015
- Samantha Irby – humorist, 2020, 2023
- Baron Ireland (pseudonym of Nate Salisbury) – humorist, poet, 1925
- Rea Irvin – advisory editor, art editor, cover artist and illustrator, 1925–1958
- Adam Iscoe – reporter, 2021–2023
- Kate Isenberg – cartoonist, 2020–2025
- C. J. (pseudonym) – writer, 1925
- Lauren Michele Jackson – critic, 2018–2025
- Shirley Jackson – fiction writer, 1943–1953, 2013–2020
- Gideon Jacobs – reporter, 2016, 2023–2024
- Javier Jaén – illustrator, 1999–2016
- Madhur Jaffrey – food writer and memoirist, 2002, 2021
- Neima Jahromi – reporter, 2017–2018, 2022
- Clive James – poet, 2013–2015
- Marquis James (pseudonyms: Quid, M. J.) – writer, 1925
- Leslie Jamison – writer, 2014–2016, 2018, 2021–2023
- Brooke Jarvis – critic, 2021
- Maya Jasanoff – writer, 2019
- Marie-Helene Jeeves – illustrator, 2021
- Lyll Becerra de Jenkins - short story writer, 1974
- Jersey (pseudonym) – writer, 1925
- Ruth Prawer Jhabvala – short story writer, 1957–2013
- Carolita Johnson – cartoonist, 2013–2023
- Denis Johnson – short story writer, 1982–2017
- Ian Johnson – reporter, 2013–2014
- R. Kikuo Johnson – cover artist, 2006, 2016–2018, 2020–2024
- Sophie Lucido Johnson – cartoonist, 2020–2021, 2023
- Alva Johnston – writer, 1928–1952
- Edward P. Jones – fiction writer
- Stanley Jones – writer, 1925
- Federico Jordan – illustrator
- Colin Jost – humorist, 2011–2015
- Anna Journey – poet, 2021
- Ana Juan – cover artist, 2013–2016, 2022
- Miranda July – fiction writer, 2007, 2022
- Ila June (pseudonym?) – reporter, 1925

== K–Ki ==
- Gayle Kabaker – cover artist, 2012–2017
- Pauline Kael – film critic, 1968–2014, 2016
- Idrees Kahloon – critic, 2020–2024
- E. J. Kahn – journalist, essayist, staff writer, 1937–1992
- Jennifer Kahn – journalist, 2008–2010
- Mindy Kaling – humorist, writer, 2019
- Peter Kalischer – journalist, 1947–1951
- Maira Kalman – cover artist and illustrator, 1998–2020
- Eleni Kalorkoti – illustrator, 2018
- Bendik Kaltenborn – illustrator, 2013
- Inkoo Kang – critic, staff writer, 2022–2025
- Daniel Kanhai – cartoonist, 2024–2025
- Zachary Kanin – cartoonist, cover artist and writer, 2005–2022
- Bruce Eric Kaplan – cartoonist and cover artist, 1991–2025
- Akash Kapur – journalist, 2005, 2011, 2013–2016, 2021, 2024
- Paul Karasik – illustrator, 2013–2019, 2021
- Ilonka Karasz – cover artist and illustrator, 1925–1973
- Nurit Karlin – cartoonist, 1974–1988, 2019
- Tibor Kárpáti – illustrator, 2013–2016
- O. Karpinsky (pseudonym) – illustrator, 1993–1996
- Ben Katchor – cartoonist
- Neal Katyal – legal correspondent, 2024
- Farley Katz – cartoonist, 2010–2020, 2022–2023
- Jason Adam Katzenstein – cartoonist, 2015–2025
- Dan Kaufman – reporter, 2011–2018
- George S. Kaufman – advisory editor, 1925
- Yann Kebbi – illustrator, 2014
- Patrick Radden Keefe – staff writer, 2006–2008, 2010, 2012–2024
- Matthew Keegan – cartoonist
- Garrison Keillor – humorist, 1984–1991
- Bill Keller – journalist, 2015
- Eldon Kelley – cartoonist, 1925
- Kitty Kelley – journalist, 2019
- Donika Kelly – poet, 2020
- Erin I. Kelly – writer, 2021
- Sarah Kempa – cartoonist, 2023–2024
- Christine Kenneally – writer, 2006, 2009, 2021
- John Kenney – humorist, 2004–2006, 2008–2016, 2018–2024
- Lars Kenseth – cartoonist, 2016–2022, 2024–2025
- Etgar Keret – fiction, 2012–2017
- Raffi Khatchadourian – staff writer, 2007–2022
- Ludmila Khersonsky – poet, 2022
- Dhruv Khullar – medical journalist, 2020–2025
- Edmund J. Kiefer – humorist, 1925
- Mary D. Kierstead – writer, 1959–1990
- Silvia Killingsworth – editor, 2010–2016
- E. Tammy Kim – reporter, 2016
- Billy Kimball – humorist, 2010–2013
- Jamaica Kincaid – writer, 1974–2020, 2022
- Stephen King – writer
- Galway Kinnell – poet, 2013
- John Kinsella – poet, 2010–2014
- Karl Kirchwey – poet, 2013
- Michael Kirkham – illustrator, 2014
- David D. Kirkpatrick – staff writer, 2023
- Dan Kirkwood – cartoonist, 2024
- Walter Kirn – writer, 1995–2013
- Adam Kirsch – literary critic, 2004–2016
- Tom Kizzia – writer, 2015

== Kl–Ku ==
- Sophie Klahr – poet, 2017
- L. S. Klatt – poet, 2021
- Ezra Klein – writer, 2012–2013
- I. Klein – cartoonist, 1925
- Jessi Klein – writer, 2016
- Joe Klein – reporter, 1996–2002
- Eric Klinenberg – essayist, 2013–2021
- John Klossner – cartoonist, 2014–2017, 2023
- Saki Knafo – reporter, 2021
- Clarence Knapp – writer, 1925
- Karl Ove Knausgård – writer, 2015
- Clayton Knight – cartoonist, 1925
- Sam Knight – staff writer, 2014–2021
- Brendan George Ko – photographer, 2021
- Arthur Kober – humorist, 1926
- Jamil Jan Kochai – writer, 2019, 2021–2023
- John Koethe – poet, 2015
- Ava Kofman – staff writer, 2022–2023, 2025
- Dan Kois – writer, 2010, 2019, 2023, 2025
- Laura Kolbe – poet, 2023–2024
- Elizabeth Kolbert – staff writer, 1999–2023
- Sheelah Kolhatkar – reporter, staff writer, 2008–2009, 2016–2024
- Yusef Komunyakaa – poet, 2013–2014
- Eric Konigsberg – reporter, 1994–2013
- Brian Koppelman – humorist, 2021
- Edward Koren – cartoonist, 1962–2023
- Carolyn Kormann – staff writer, 2011–2023
- David Kortava – reporter, 2017–2021
- Anatol Kovarsky – cartoonist, 1947–1969.
- Alex Kozinski – essayist
- Anna Krachey – photographer, 2016
- Danielle Kraese – humorist, 2019–2023
- Fernando Krahn – cartoonist
- Jenna Krajeski – writer, 2011–
- Jane Kramer – staff writer, 1964–2017
- Mimi Kramer – theatre critic, 1987–1992
- Jennifer Krasinski – reporter, 2023
- Nicole Krauss – fiction writer, 2004–2005, 2010, 2013, 2018, 2020
- Ken Krimstein – cartoonist, 2015–2017, 2021, 2024
- Nikhil Krishnan – critic, 2022–2026
- Luke Kruger-Howard – cartoonist, 2021
- Arthur Krystal – fiction writer, 1998–2022
- Maxine Kumin – poet, 2013
- Milan Kundera – fiction writer, 1979–
- Anita Kunz – cover artist, 2022
- Peter Kuper – illustrator, 1994–2019
- Ethan Kuperberg – humorist, 2012–
- Michael Kupperman – illustrator, 1993–2005
- Amy Kurzweil – cartoonist, 2017, 2023
- Rachel Kushner – fiction writer, 2014–2018, 2021
- Ilyse Kusnetz – poet, 2017
- Rob Kutner – illustrator, 2020

== L–Le ==
- A. G. L. (pseudonym) – writer, 1925
- A. L. L. (pseudonym) – writer, 1925
- Christopher La Farge – poet, fiction writer, 1940s
- Paul La Farge – writer, 2012, 2014
- Eric Lach – reporter, 2020
- Tim Lahan – illustrator, 2016–2017, 2021
- Jhumpa Lahiri – fiction writer, 1998–2021
- John Lahr – theatre critic, 1991–2016, 2020
- Alexander Laing – poet, 1950
- Nick Laird – poet, 2011, 2014–2015, 2017, 2020–2021, 2023
- Padma Lakshmi – contributor, 2019
- Lalalimola – illustrator, 2021
- John Lanchester – reporter, 1995–2016
- Deborah Landau – poet, 2015–2023
- Anthony Lane – film critic, 1992–2025
- Ring Lardner – writer, 1925
- Susan Lardner – book critic
- Lauren Larson – reporter, 2019
- Maggie Larson – cartoonist, 2017, 2021, 2023
- Sarah Larson – staff writer, 2009–2011, 2013–2025
- James Lasdun – writer, 1989–2017
- Jeanne Marie Laskas – writer, 2016
- Last Night (pseudonym) – theatre critic, 1925
- Natan Last – crosswords, 2021
- Sara Lautman – illustrator, 2016–2019, 2021
- Tal Lavin – reporter, 2015–2018
- Mary Lawton – cartoonist, 2024
- Zohar Lazar – illustrator, 1994–2014
- John Le Carré – writer, 2000–2013
- Ursula K. Le Guin – author, 1985
- Andrea Lee – fiction, 2008, 2021
- Chang-Rae Lee – writer, 1995–2021
- Suerynn Lee – cartoonist, 2020–2023
- Sylvia Legris – poet, 2014
- David Lehman – poet, 2017
- Jonah Lehrer – writer, 2008–2012
- Matthew Leifheit – photographer, 2022
- Julia Leigh – cartoonist, 2021–2022
- Robert Leighton – cartoonist, 2002–2017, 2021–2022
- Pascal Lemaitre – illustrator, 2013
- Nicholas Lemann – staff writer, 1999–2022
- Baird Leonard – poet, 1925–1940
- Jill Lepore – writer, 2005–2026
- Ben Lerner – fiction writer, 2019, 2022
- Sharon Lerner – journalist, 2024
- Suzannah Lessard – staff writer, 1985
- Amelia Lester – reporter, editor, 2008–2015
- Caroline Lester – journalist, 2021
- Jonathan Lethem – fiction writer, 2002–2005, 2007–2009, 2011–2014, 2016–2017, 2019–2023
- Sarah Letteney – illustrator, 2022
- Arnie Levin – cartoonist
- Philip Levine – poet, 1979, 2014, 2022
- Frances Leviston – poet, 2019
- Ariel Levy – staff writer, 2008–2022
- Newman Levy – humorist, poet, 1925
- Sharon Levy – illustrator, 2020
- Eric Lewis – cartoonist, 2000–2019
- Jerald Lewis – cartoonist, 2022–2023
- Tracy Hammond Lewis – writer, 1925
- Gideon Lewis-Kraus – staff writer, 2021

== Li–Lz ==
- Yiyun Li – fiction writer, 2004–2017
- Evan Lian – cartoonist, 2019, 2023
- E. P. Licursi – reporter, 2017
- Josh Lieb – humorist, 2017
- A. J. Liebling – journalism critic and boxing writer, 1935–1963, 2022
- Max Lief – poet, 1925
- Ada Limón – poet, 2014–2017, 2021
- Hartley Lin – cartoonist, 2020, 2022–2025
- Meghan Linehan – illustrator, 2024
- Liniers – cover artist, 2014–2015, 2021
- Sam Lipsyte – humorist, 2010–2012, 2014–2015, 2018, 2021, 2023
- Wyna Liu – crosswords, 2021
- Ryan Lizza – political writer, Washington DC correspondent, 2007–2016
- André da Loba – illustrator, 2021
- Patricia Lockwood – poet, 2013
- Andy Logan – writer, 1942–1997, 2000
- Lois Long (pseudonym: Lipstick; L. L.) – 'On and Off the Avenue' columnist, 1925–1934, 1936–1969, 1994, 2000
- Tim Long – humorist
- Brendan Loper – illustrator, 2020–2022
- Julyssa Lopez – reporter, 2019–2021
- Lee Lorenz – cartoonist, editor, 1958–2015
- Jacques de Loustal – cover artist, illustrator, 2010
- Joseph Low – cover artist, illustrator, 1940–1980
- Christian Lowe – illustrator, 2016
- Julian Lucas – staff writer, 2018–2023
- Aimee Lucido – crosswords, 2019–2025
- Michael Luo – editor, 2017–2025
- Thomas Lux – poet, 2015, 2021
- Shauna Lyon – editor, reporter, 2006–2019, 2021–2025

== M–Mc ==
- H. A. M. (pseudonym) – reporter, 1925
- H. R. M (pseudonym) – reporter, 1925
- Peter Maass – international journalist
- Larissa MacFarquhar – reporter, 1993–2018
- Alec MacGillis – reporter, 2015–2016, 2019–2023
- Virginia Woods Mackall – poet, 1925
- Ellin Mackay – writer, 1925
- Gus Mager – cartoonist, 1925
- Navied Mahdavian – cartoonist, 2018
- Vincent Mahé – illustrator, 2016
- Niall Maher – cartoonist, 2024
- Kenneth Mahood – cartoonist, 1974
- Circe Maia – poet, 2013
- Dana Jeri Maier – cartoonist, 2018
- Amit Majmudar – poet, 2017
- Janet Malcolm – staff writer, 2010
- Dora Malech – poet, 2013
- Thomas Mallon – essayist and critic, 1997, 1999, 2001–2025
- Christina Malman – cover artist, illustrator, 1937–1956
- Russell Maloney – reporter, 1938
- Herman J. Mankiewicz (pseudonym: H. J. M.) – writer, 1925–1926
- Robert Mankoff – cartoonist and editor, 1977–2016
- Maurice Manning – poet, 2001, 2021
- Andrew Marantz – staff writer, 2011–2025
- Joseph Moncure March – editor, poet, 1925–1929
- Marisa Acocella Marchetto – cartoonist, 2021, 2023
- Ruth Margalit – editor, writer, 2011–2021
- Sheila Yasmin Marikar – reporter, 2016–2023
- Morris Markey – reporter, 1925–1931, 1933–1936, 1939–1941
- Ken Marks – reporter, 2018–2023
- Jeffrey Marlow – writer, 2022
- Sam Marlow – illustrator, 2016–2017
- Don Marquis – cartoonist
- Reginald Marsh – cartoonist, 1925
- Jay Martel – humorist, 2012–2021
- Andrew Martin – critic, 2012–2014
- Charles E. Martin (pseudonym: cem) – cover artist, illustrator, 1947–1987
- Guy Martin – writer, 2009
- Henry Martin – cartoonist, 1974
- Hugh Martin – poet, 2016
- Steve Martin – humorist, 1996–2021
- Groucho Marx (as Julius H. Marx) – humorist, 1925–1929, 1942
- Patricia Marx – humorist, reporter, 1989–2022
- Michael Maslin – cartoonist, 1977–2026
- Laurence Maslon – writer, 2015
- Hisham Matar – writer, 2011–
- Michaelangelo Matos – reporter, 2018–2023
- John Matthias – writer, 2021
- Lorenzo Mattotti – illustrator, cover artist, 1993–1994, 2021–2022, 2024–2025
- Ben Mauk – reporter, 2021
- D. T. Max – staff writer, 1997, 1999, 2006–2009, 2011–2023
- William Maxwell – editor, 1936–1975
- Jane Mayer – journalist, staff writer, 1995–2022
- Jeff Maysh – reporter, 2022
- David Mazzuchelli – illustrator
- Imbolo Mbue – fiction writer, 2021
- Cathal McCabe – poet, 2012
- Bruce McCall – cover artist, humorist, illustrator, 1980–2023
- Colum McCann – fiction writer, 1999–2014
- John McCarten – film critic, 1945–1960
- Cormac McCarthy – writer, 2013
- Tom McCarthy – writer, 2014–2016
- J. D. McClatchy – poet, 2016
- Molly McCloskey – writer, 2024
- Davis McCombs – poet, 2015
- David McCord – poet
- T. S. McCoy – illustrator, 2014
- Alice McDermott – fiction writer, 2000–2015
- Anna McDonald (poet) – poet, 2017–2019
- Patrick McElvie – cartoonist, 2023
- Fiona McFarlane – fiction writer, 2013–2016
- Phyllis McGinley – poet, 1950–2019
- Ben McGrath – staff writer, 1999–2015, 2022
- Campbell McGrath – poet, 2014, 2022
- Charles McGrath – editor, critic, 1986
- Douglas McGrath – humorist, 2016
- Thomas McGuane – fiction writer, 1994, 2003–2006, 2011–2017, 2019, 2021–2022, 2024
- James Kevin McGuinness (pseudonym: J. M.) – humorist, poet, reporter, 1925
- Richard McGuire – illustrator, 1999–2015, 2020–2021
- Jay McInerney – fact–checker
- Fergus McIntosh – reporter, 2018–2019
- Andy McKay – illustrator, 2013
- Donald McKee – cartoonist, 1925
- St. Clair McKelway – editor, nonfiction writer, 1933–1980
- Elizabeth McKenzie – fiction writer, 2014
- Bill McKibben – staff writer, 1982–1987, 2015, 2024
- Maureen N. McLane – poet, 2013
- Dysart McMullen – writer, 1925
- Elisabeth McNair – cartoonist, 2018–2024
- John McNamee – cartoonist, 2016–2017, 2021
- John McNulty – writer, 1938
- William Slavens McNutt – writer, 1925
- Will McPhail – cartoonist, 2016–2019, 2021
- John McPhee – staff writer, 1963, 1965–1984, 1986–1990, 1992–1994, 1996–2000, 2002–2005, 2007, 2009–2016, 2018, 2020–2024

== Me–Mz ==
- Jane Mead – poet, 2021
- Rebecca Mead – staff writer, 1997–2025
- Thomas Meaney – essayist, journalist, 2016, 2018, 2020–2021, 2024
- David Means – fiction writer, 2004–2020
- Lyon Mearson – writer, 1925
- Diane Mehta – poet, 2022
- Ved Mehta – fiction and nonfiction writer
- Erika Meitner – poet, 2021
- Paula Mejia – reporter, 2018–2019
- Maile Meloy – fiction writer, 2000–
- Louis Menand – literary critic, staff writer, 1991–1994, 1996–1998, 2000–2023
- H. L. Mencken – essayist, 1934–1937, 1939, 1941–1945, 1948–1949
- Daniel Mendelsohn – essayist, 1996–2017
- Mia Mercado – humorist, 2018
- James Merrill – poet
- W. S. Merwin – poet, 1955–1958, 1960–1997, 1999–2005, 2007–2014
- Ever Meulen – illustrator, 2010
- George Meyer – humorist, 2007–2014
- S. M. Meyers – reporter, 1938
- Seth Meyers – humorist, writer, 2019
- Leonard Michaels – fiction writer, 1998–2003
- Alice Duer Miller – advisory editor, 1925
- Laura Miller – critic, 2003–2005, 2010–2012, 2014–2020, 2022–2023
- Warren Miller – cartoonist, 1974
- Steven Millhauser – fiction writer, 1981–2013
- Tony Millionaire – illustrator, 1994–2004
- Tyler Mills – poet, 2015
- Lonnie Millsap – cartoonist, 2020–2023
- John Minczeski – poet, 2016
- Hasan Minhaj – contributor, 2019
- Elizabeth Minkel – critic, 2010–2014
- Joseph Mirachi – cartoonist, 1974
- Leo Mirani – reporter, 2020
- Dan Misdea – illustrator, 2021
- Yukio Mishima – fiction writer, 2024
- Pankaj Mishra – critic, 2007–2008, 2010–2014, 2016–2019, 2021
- Joseph Mitchell – nonfiction writer, 1931–2015
- Ange Mlinko – poet, 2009–2010, 2015, 2024
- Seth Mnookin – journalist, 2002–2015
- Frank Modell – cartoonist, 1946–2019
- J. R. Moehringer – journalist, 2023
- Luke Mogelson – fiction writer and reporter, 2013–2017, 2021
- Mokshini – illustrator, 2017–2021
- Ariel Molvig – illustrator, 2010, 2015
- Rachel Monroe – reporter, 2017, 2022
- John Montague – poet, 2010
- Liz Montague – cartoonist, 2019–2020, 2023
- Kyle Mooney – humorist, 2020
- Jim Moore – poet, 2005, 2018, 2021–2024
- Alan Moorehead – journalist, 1950
- Betsy Morais – reporter, 2012–2019
- Lola Moral – cover artist, 2024
- Ethan Mordden – fiction and nonfiction writer, 1988–1992
- Richard Morgan – reporter, 2013–2014
- Wallace Morgan – cartoonist, 1925
- Evgeny Morozov – writer, 2013–2014
- Bob Morris – reporter, 1995, 1997, 1999–2000, 2018–2019, 2021, 2023–2026
- Toni Morrison – writer, 2015
- John Mosher – film critic, 1928–1942
- Stanley Moss – poet, 2019
- Françoise Mouly – art editor, 1993–2024
- Daniyal Mueenuddin – writer, 2007–2012
- Christoph Mueller – cover artist, 2020
- P. S. Mueller – cartoonist, 2014–2020, 2025
- Elias Muhanna – reporter, 2014–2019
- Siddhartha Mukherjee – medical journalist, 2016–2021
- Susan Mulcahy – reporter, 2019–2020
- Paul Muldoon – poetry editor, 1994–2018
- James Mulligan – cartoonist
- Lewis Mumford – architecture critic, 1949–50
- Oliver Munday – illustrator, 2016
- Alice Munro – fiction writer, 1977–2015
- Ben Munster – journalist, 2021
- Roman Muradov – illustrator, 2014–2015
- Haruki Murakami – fiction and nonfiction writer, 1990–2021
- Eileen Myles – poet, 2015–2023

== N–O ==
- Vladimir Nabokov – fiction, 1942–1976, 2021
- Merle Nacht – illustrator, cover artist, 1986
- V. S. Naipaul – journalist, 2020
- Jared Nangle – cartoonist, 2021, 2023–2025
- Ogden Nash – poet, 1930–1961, 1963–1971, 2002
- Mimoucha Nebel – cartoonist
- Will Nediger – crosswords and puzzles, 2021–2025
- Antonya Nelson – short story writer, 1991–2014
- Kadir Nelson – cover artist, 2013, 2015–2024
- Kenton Nelson – cover artist, 2021
- Edward Newhouse – fiction writer, 1939—1965
- Jeremy Nguyen – cartoonist, 2017–2023, 2025
- Vi-An Nguyen – cartoonist, 2024
- Nicolas Niarchos – reporter, fact–checker, 2014–2021
- Tucker Nichols – illustrator, 2019, 2021
- Christoph Niemann – cover artist and illustrator, 1998, 2013–2015, 2017–2025
- Colin Nissan – writer, cartoonist, 2012–2017, 2022
- Rachel Nolan (historian) – writer, 2020
- Reyna Noriega – cover artist, 2021
- Mary Norris – copy editor, writer, 1978–2021
- Dorthe Nors – short story writer, 2013–2015
- Paul Noth – cartoonist, 2006–2024
- B. J. Novak – humorist, 2013
- D. Nurkse – poet, 2020
- Emily Nussbaum – television critic, 2011–2020, 2022–2024
- Debra Nystrom – poet, 2013
- B. O. (pseudonym) – writer, 1925
- Joyce Carol Oates – short story writer, 1994–1999, 2001–2007, 2009–2023
- Miller Oberman – poet, 2021
- Téa Obreht – writer, 2009–2016
- John O'Brien – cartoonist, 2006–2019
- Mike O'Brien – humorist, 2015
- Sean O'Brien – poet, 2014
- Mark O'Connell – critic, 2020–2021
- C. L. O'Dell – poet, 2018
- Tom O'Donnell – humorist, 2013–2016
- John O'Hara – short story writer, 1928–1969
- Alix Ohlin – fiction writer, 2017
- Alexis Okeowo – staff writer, 2010–2022
- Ben Okri – fiction writer, 2021–2022
- Sharon Olds – poet, 2015–2016
- Edith Oliver – theatre critic, 1985
- Joseph O'Neill – fiction writer, 2014–2018
- Han Ong – fiction writer, 2021
- Eren Orbey – writer, 2016–2022
- Susan Orlean – staff writer, 1987–2021
- Frank Ormsby – poet, 2013
- Meghan O'Rourke – poet, 2017
- Kathy Osborn – cover artist, 1988–2010
- Yasin Osman – cartoonist, 2021, 2023
- Evan Osnos – staff writer, 2008–2022, 2024
- Gili Ostfield – editor, 2020
- David Ostow – cartoonist, 2021
- Alice Oswald – poet, 2016
- Cabot O'Toole (pseudonym?) – reporter, 1925
- Tony Oursler – artist, 2024
- David Owen – staff writer, 1990–1995, 1998–2019, 2021–2025
- Lauren Oyler – writer, 2019–2023
- Amos Oz – fiction writer, 1995–
- Cynthia Ozick – critic, fiction writer, 1977, 1980, 1983–1984, 1988–1990, 1992–1993, 1996–2000, 2002–2003, 2021–2023, 2025

== P–Pe ==
- D. D. P. (pseudonym) – writer, 1925
- Freddie Packard – fact–checker, 1929–1974
- George Packer – staff writer, 2003–2018
- Grace Paley – short story writer
- Sarah Paley – writer, 1993
- Andrew Palmer – critic, 2012–2016
- Drew Panckeri – cartoonist, 2015–2017, 2021, 2023
- Corey Pandolph – cartoonist, 2011–2019, 2023
- Gary Panter – illustrator 1994–2006
- Mollie Panter-Downes – nonfiction writer, author of 'Letter from London', 1939–1984
- Gregory Pardlo – poet, 2017, 2021, 2024
- Ed Park – short story writer, 2013–2016
- W. B. Park – cartoonist, 2010
- Dorothy Parker – advisory editor, short story writer, drama critic, poet, humorist, 1925–1963, 2019
- Ian Parker – staff writer, 1992–2021
- James Reid Parker – writer, 194?
- Laura Parker – reporter, 2013–2016
- Teresa Burns Parkhurst – cartoonist, 2017–2021, 2023–2024
- Casey Parks – journalist, 2020–2021
- Elise Paschen – poet, 1995–1996, 2014, 2024
- Willa Paskin – critic, 2016
- Linda Pastan – poet, 2013
- Ann Patchett – writer, 2020–2021
- Don Paterson – poet, 2017
- Jason Patterson – illustrator, 2010–2016, 2021
- Troy Patterson – critic, 2018
- Frances Gray Patton – short story writer, 1949
- Nick Paumgarten – staff writer, 2000–2024
- David Peace – writer, 2013
- Sheldon Pearce – reporter, 2020–2026
- Zoe Pearl – humor, 2017–2021
- Alex Pearson – cartoonist, 2021, 2024–2025
- Luke Pearson – cover artist, 2013
- Basharat Peer – reporter, 2012–2014
- Peggy (pseudonym) – writer, 1925
- George Pelecanos – writer, 2013
- Oren Peleg – writer, 2024–2026
- Pell Mell (pseudonym) – reporter, 1925
- Jenn Pelly – reporter, 2022–2023
- Brock Pemberton – journalist, 1926
- Murdock Pemberton (pseudonyms: Froid; M. P.?) – art critic, essayist, poet, 1925–1926
- Arantza Peña Popo – illustrator, 2020–2021
- Irving Penn – photographer, 1997–2001, 2016
- Jorge Penné – cartoonist, 2022
- S. J. Perelman – humorist, 1930–1979
- Tullio Pericoli – illustrator 1996–2000
- Lucia Perillo – poet, 2014
- Asher Perlman – cartoonist, 2021–2025
- Reuven Perlman – illustrator, 2022
- Philippe Petit-Roulet – illustrator, 1994–2015
- Amanda Petrusich – staff writer, 2015–2025
- Bruce Petty – cartoonist
- Mary Petty – cartoonist, cover artist, 1927–1966, 2019

== Ph–Q ==
- Hai-Dang Phan – poet, 2015
- Maya Phillips – reporter, poet, 2019–2020, 2022
- Claudia Roth Pierpont – staff writer, 1990–2016
- Antonio Giovanni Pinna – illustrator, 2021–2022, 2024
- Robert Pinsky – poet, 1977, 1979–1980, 1982–1983, 1989–1991, 1993–1994, 1998–2001, 2003–2004, 2006, 2008–2015, 2017–2025
- Guillaume Plantevin – illustrator, 2014
- Millie von Platen – illustrator, 2020–2021
- Sylvia Plath – poet
- Russell Platt – music critic, 2000–2018
- Stanley Plumly – poet, 2013
- Ethel Plummer – cartoonist, 1925
- Plutarch (pseudonym) – reporter, 1925
- Michael Pollan – writer, 2013–2015
- Hart Pomerantz – humorist, 2018–2020
- Miguel Porlan – illustrator, 2014–2017
- Andrew Porter – music critic, 1972–1992
- Julien Posture – illustrator, 2025
- Gus Powell – photographer
- Roswell J. Powers – reporter, 1925
- Steve Powers – artist, illustrator 2000–2006
- Eyal Press – reporter, 2014–2017, 2023
- Douglas Preston – writer, 1995–2013
- Laura Preston – reporter, 2022
- Richard Preston – writer, 1986–
- Garrett Price – cartoonist
- George Price – cartoonist, 1974
- Jana Prikryl – poet, 2014
- George Prochnik – writer, 2013–2017
- The Professor (pseudonym) – critic, 1925
- Annie Proulx – short story writer, 1997–2022
- Lourenço Providência – illustrator, 2023
- Lia Purpura – poet, 2012–2013
- Kirstin Valdez Quade – short story writer, 2014
- Quid (pseudonym of Marquis James) – reporter, 1925

== R ==
- Jonathan Raban – journalist, travel writer
- Radio – illustrator, 2015
- Charles Rafferty – poet, 2017
- Terrence Rafferty – film critic, 1996, 2021
- Emma Rathbone – humorist, writer, 2013–2023
- Olga Ravn – fiction writer, 2023
- Richard Rayner – reporter, 1998–2010
- Gardner Rea – cartoonist, cover artist, 1925–1933
- Shannon Reed – humorist, 2017
- Monte Reel – writer, 2015
- Caitlin Reid – crosswords, 2017–2021
- Laurence Reid
- Donald Reilly – cartoonist, 1986
- Paul Reilly – cartoonist, 1925
- James Reiss – poet, 1973–
- Seth Reiss – humorist, 2013, 2015–2018, 2021–2022
- Winfred Rembert – author, 2021
- Andy Rementer – illustrator, 2017–2018
- David Remnick – editor and writer, 1992–2024
- Elizabeth Renstrom – photographer, 2016
- James Reston Jr. – journalist, 1985–
- Matt Reuter – illustrator, 2022
- Shonda Rhimes – writer, 2016
- Xan Rice – writer, 2012–2013
- Simon Rich – humorist, 2010, 2022
- James Richardson – poet, 2015
- Mordecai Richler – essayist
- Mischa Richter – cartoonist, 1986
- Jeanie Riess – writer, 2021
- Nicole Rifkin – cover artist, 2022
- John Ritter – illustrator, 1995–2004
- Michael Robbins – poet, 2009–2014
- Akeem Roberts – illustrator, 2020, 2022
- Victoria Roberts – cartoonist, 1988–2022, 2024–2025
- W. Heath Robinson – cartoonist, 1925
- Leo Robson – critic, 2021
- Norman Rockwell – illustrator
- Edel Rodriguez – illustrator, cover artist, 1994–2021
- José Antonio Rodríguez – poet, 2017, 2020–2022
- Dan Roe – illustrator, 2015
- David Roe – staff writer, 1985
- Ray Rohn – cover artist, 1925
- Nick Romeo – writer, 2016–2017, 2020–2024
- Rollo Romig – reporter, 2019–2022
- Sally Rooney – fiction, 2021
- Michelle Brittan Rosado – poet, 2017
- Alison Rose – receptionist, contributor, 1969–2003(?)
- Carl Rose – cartoonist, 1926
- Dan Rosen – cartoonist and humorist, 2017–2019, 2021–2023
- Ellis Rosen – cartoonist, 2017–2022, 2024
- Jonathan Rosen – writer, 1993–2014
- Laurie Rosenwald – illustrator 1993–2004
- Helen Rosner – staff writer, food critic, 2017–2025
- Al Ross – cartoonist, 1974
- Alex Ross – music critic, 1993–2025
- Harold Ross – co–founder, editor, 1925–1951
- Lillian Ross – staff writer, 1945–2012
- Herb Roth – cartoonist, 1925
- Philip Roth – fiction, 1958–2017
- Joshua Rothman – editor, 2012–2026
- Berton Roueché – medical writer, 1943–1991
- Kristen Roupenian – critic and fiction writer, 2017, 2023
- Richard H. Rovere – columnist, 1944–1979
- Julian Rowe – illustrator, 2013
- Irving Ruan – humorist, 2018–2023
- Gibbons Ruark – poet, 2013
- Julian Rubinstein – writer, 2013
- Paul Rudnick – writer, 1998–2001, 2003–2018, 2020–2024
- Naila Ruechel – photographer, 2021
- Paul Ruffino – nonfiction writer/poet
- Salman Rushdie – author, 2015
- Anna Russell – reporter, 2017–2019, 2021
- Karen Russell – short story writer, 2005–2016
- Anthony Russo – cover artist, illustrator, 2003–2023
- Jay Ruttenberg – reporter, 2016, 2018–2023
- Sergio Ruzzier – illustrator, 1996–2000
- George F. T. Ryall (pseudonym: Audax Minor) – horseracing reporter, 1926–1978

== S–Se ==
- F. J. S. (pseudonym) – reporter, 1925
- F. S. (pseudonym of Frank Sullivan?) – reporter, 1925
- H. E. S. (pseudonym) – reporter, 1925
- R. A. S. (pseudonym) – reporter, 1925–1926
- R. S. (pseudonym) – reporter, 1925
- R. W. S. (pseudonym) – reporter, 1925
- T. S. (pseudonym) – reporter, 1926
- Adam Ehrlich Sachs – short story writer, 2016
- Adam Sacks – illustrator, 2022
- Mike Sacks – writer, 2012, 2021–2022
- Oliver Sacks – neurologist, writer, 1992–2019
- Ira Sadoff – poet, 2016
- Doreen St. Félix – staff writer, television critic, 2015–2022
- Marina Sagona – illustrator 1994–2000
- Ioanna Sakellaraki – photographer, 2021
- J. D. Salinger – short story writer
- Daniel Salmieri – illustrator, 2019
- Özge Samancı – cartoonist, 2021, 2023
- Andrés Sandoval – illustrator, 2013
- Kelefa Sanneh – critic, staff writer, 2001–2023
- Winthrop Sargeant – music critic
- Rob Sato – illustrator, 2023
- George Saunders – writer, 1992–2023
- Ayşegül Savaş – fiction writer, 2019, 2021–2022, 2024–2025
- Sawdust (pseudonym) – humorist, 1925
- Charles Saxon – cartoonist, 1974
- Saïd Sayrafiezadeh – fiction, 2010–2018, 2021, 2025
- Guido Scarabottolo – illustrator, 2013–2017
- Gerald Scarfe – illustrator
- Simon Schama – historian, writer, 1994–2018
- Steven Schapin – critic, 2005–2007, 2010, 2013, 2016
- Bill Scheft – humorist, writer, 1998–2023
- Jonathan Schell – staff writer, 1967–1987, 2000
- Robyn Schiff – poet, 2013
- Stacy Schiff – nonfiction writer
- Stephen Schiff – staff writer, 1992–2003
- Peter Schjeldahl – art critic, staff writer, 1998–2022
- Margaret Schloeman – cover artist, 1925
- Nicholas Schmidle – staff writer, 2012–2017
- Collier Schorr – photographer, 2020
- Birgit Schössow – cover artist, 2013–2019
- Michael Schulman – staff writer, 2006–2023
- Philip Schultz – poet, 1975–2017
- Kathryn Schulz – staff writer, 2014–2025
- Alexandra Schwartz – staff writer, theatre critic, 2013–2024
- Benjamin Schwartz – cartoonist, 2013–2021, 2024
- Madeleine Schwartz – critic, 2010–2011, 2014–2015, 2019–2021
- Mattathias Schwartz – staff writer, 2011–2016
- Jonathan Schwarz – parodist, humorist
- Andrea K. Scott – writer, 2008–2023
- Noël Scott – writer, 1925
- John Seabrook – staff writer, 1989–2017, 2021
- Nicole Sealey – poet, 2016, 2023
- Ronald Searle – cartoonist, 1950s–1990, 2019
- Laura Secor – reporter, 2005–2017, 2020
- David Sedaris – humorist, 1995–2021
- Lore Segal – fiction writer, 2017
- Parul Sehgal – staff writer, 2021
- Brian Seibert – reporter, 2018–2025
- Hannah Seidlitz – writer, 2022
- Jean-Jacques Sempé – cartoonist, cover artist, 1978–2016, 2018–2019, 2022
- Martha Serpas – poet, 2005–2014
- Vijay Seshadri – poet, 2020
- Seth – cartoonist, cover artist, 2015–2018
- Diane Seuss – poet, 2015
- Anne Sexton – poet

== Sh–Sm ==
- Danny Shanahan – illustrator, 1990s–2020
- George V. Shanks – cartoonist, 1925
- Natalie Shapero – poet, 2016
- Alan Shapiro – poet, 2013
- Benjamin Shapiro – reporter, 2015–2018
- Robert Shaplen – reporter, 1986
- Steven Shapin – critic, 2016
- Leanne Shapton – illustrator, 2022
- Akhil Sharma – short stories, 1997–2016
- Brenda Shaughnessy – poet, 2005, 2010–2011, 2015, 2019, 2022
- Ari Shavit – writer, 2001–2013
- Charles Green Shaw (pseudonym: C. G. S.) – humorist, 1925
- Helen Shaw – theatre critic, 2022–2025
- Michael Shaw – cartoonist, 2014, 2016, 2021, 2023
- Desmond Shawe-Taylor – music critic, 1974
- William Shawn – 1933–1987 (editor from 1952)
- Anna Shechtman – crosswords, 2018–2025
- Justin Sheen – cartoonist, 2021–2022, 2024
- Jim Shepard – short story writer, 2010
- Mimi Sheraton – food writer, 1948, 1997–2012
- Barbara Shermund – cartoonist, cover artist, 1925–1944, 2019
- Yuko Shimizu – illustrator 1996–2000
- Evie Shockley – poet, 2023
- Tamara Shopsin – illustrator, 2016–2021, 2023
- Jane Shore – poet, 2013–2020
- Etaoin Shrdlu (pseudonym) – writer, 1925
- Lionel Shriver – short story writer, 2013
- Gary Shteyngart – writer, 2003, 2006–2007, 2010–2014, 2016–2018, 2020–2021, 2023
- Gavin Shulman – humorist, 2013–
- Zoe Si – cartoonist, 2020–2021, 2023
- Kate Sidley – humorist, 2019
- Lee Siegel – writer, 1999–2015
- Tommy Siegel – cartoonist, 2023–2024
- Robert Sikoryak – cartoonist, cover artist, 2019
- Joan Silber – fiction writer, 2022
- Burt Silverman – cartoonist, 1986
- Sarah Silverman – contributor, 2019
- Charles Simic – poet, 1971–2021
- Paul Simms – humorist, 2013
- Susan Simple, (pseudonym: Spinster) – writer, 1925
- Gretchen Dow Simpson – cover artist, 1974–1994
- Isaac Bashevis Singer – short story writer, 1985–
- Mark Singer – journalist, staff writer, 1974–2019
- David Sipress – cartoonist, 2010–2023
- Siste Viator (pseudonym) – reporter, 1925
- Erika Sjule – cartoonist, humor writer, 2019
- Cornelia Otis Skinner – writer, 194?, 1950
- Sammi Skolmoski – cartoonist, 2020–2021, 2023
- John Skoyles – poet, 2014
- Paul Slansky – humorist, 1995–2013
- Peter Slevin – journalist, 2022
- Gibb Slife – illustrator, 1999–2004
- Barbara Smaller – cartoonist, 2004–2023
- Christine Smallwood – critic, 2012–
- Guy Richards Smit – cartoonist, 2023–2024
- Claude Smith – cartoonist
- Clint Smith – writer, 2015–2018
- Daniel Smith – writer, 2016–2017
- Jennie Erin Smith – journalist, 2013–2015
- Owen Smith – illustrator, 2010
- Patti Smith – contributing writer, 2013–2023
- Steve Smith – reporter, 2018–2021
- Tracy K. Smith – poet, 2015–2017
- Zadie Smith – fiction writer, 1999–2021

== Sn–Sz ==
- Virginia Snedeker – cover artist, illustrator, 1939–1941
- Karen Sneider – cartoonist, 2021
- Tim Sniffen – cartoonist, 2024
- Rachel Louise Snyder – writer, 2013
- Otto Soglow – cartoonist, 1931–1934, 2021
- Rebecca Solnit – writer, 2014
- Ali Solomon – cartoonist, 2018–2023
- Andrew Solomon – writer, 1995–2017, 2021
- Alexis Soloski – reporter, 2018–2019
- Bishakh Som – illustrator, 2020
- Susan Sontag – essayist and short story writer, 1973–2002
- Taymour Soomro – fiction writer, 2019
- Edward Sorel – illustrator
- Amy Davidson Sorkin – editor, staff writer, 2003, 2006, 2008–2023 (on staff since 1995)
- Vladimir Sorokin – fiction writer, 2021
- Analicia Sotelo – poet, 2016
- Meredith Southard – cartoonist, 2021, 2024
- Michael Sowa – cover artist, 2002
- Sigmund Spaeth (pseudonym: S. S.) – writer, 1925
- Trevor Spaulding – cartoonist, 2015–2017, 2022–2023
- Michael Specter – staff writer, 1998–2020
- Art Spiegelman – illustrator
- Jen Spyra – humorist, 2016–2018
- Michael Sragow – critic, 2014–2015
- Amia Srinivasan – philosopher, 2021
- Dan Stahl – reporter, 2020–2025
- Jennifer Stahl – reporter, 2009–2014?
- Brian Stauffer – cover artist, 2010
- McKenna Stayner – reporter, 2016–2017
- Ralph Steadman – illustrator
- Wendell Steavenson – contributor, 2006–
- Edward Steed – cartoonist, cover artist, 2013–2025
- Fred G. Steelman – poet, 1925–1927
- William Steig – cartoonist, cover artist, 1930–2019
- Avi Steinberg – cartoonist, 2012, 2014–2022, 2024–2025
- Saul Steinberg – cartoonist, 1963–2019
- George Steiner – cultural critic
- Peter Steiner – cartoonist
- Otto Steininger – illustrator, 2015
- Hans Stengel – cartoonist, 1925
- Bijan Stephen – reporter, 2017
- Gerald Stern – poet, 2010–2020
- Alec Stevens – illustrator
- Karl Stevens – cartoonist, 2021, 2023
- Mick Stevens – cartoonist, 1979–2025
- James Stevenson – cartoonist, 1974, 1986
- Peter Stevenson – reporter, 2010
- James B. Stewart – staff writer, 1993–2018
- Alexander Stille – writer, 2008
- Sarah Stillman – staff writer, 2011–2021, 2023–2024
- Colin Stokes – reporter, 2014–2019
- Emily Stokes – reporter, 2020
- Bianca Stone – poet, 2018–2019, 2021, 2023
- Kelly Stout – writer, 2010–2016
- Mark Strand – poet, writer, 1962–1967, 1969–1970, 1972–1973, 1975–1977, 1979–1982, 1985, 1987–1990, 1992–1993, 1995–1997, 1999–2001, 2003–2006, 2011, 2023
- Lia Strasser – cartoonist, 2024
- Charles Street (pseudonym) – reporter, 1925
- Douglas Stuart – fiction writer, 2020
- Adrienne Su – poet, 2016–2021
- Julia Suits – cartoonist, 2009–2023
- Frank Sullivan – humorist, 1925
- John Jeremiah Sullivan – writer, 2019
- Robert Sullivan – reporter, 1991–1994, 1996–2004, 2007, 2009–2010, 2012–2021, 2023–2025
- James Surowiecki – essayist and economic/financial columnist, 1998–2017
- Anna Louie Sussman – journalist, 2022
- Ward Sutton – cartoonist, 2010
- Jon Swan – staff writer and poet
- Joost Swarte – cartoonist, cover artist, 2010, 2025
- Graham Swift – fiction writer, 2021
- Rachel Syme – staff writer, 2012–2025
- Beatrice Szanton – cover artist, 1959–1969
- Wislawa Szymborska – poet, 2014

== T–V ==
- Takeshi Tadatsu – illustratör, 1994–1998
- Stephania Taladrid – writer, 2018–2025
- Margaret Talbot – staff writer, 1997–1998, 2004–2025
- Jillian Tamaki – illustrator, 2020
- Ruby Tandoh – writer, 2024
- Florent Tanet – illustrator, 2013
- Ben Taub – staff writer, 2015–2023
- Newsha Tavakolian – photographer, 2017
- Keeanga-Yamahtta Taylor – writer, 2021
- Robert Lewis Taylor – staff writer, 1938, 1940–1959, 1961–1962, 1967
- Craig Morgan Teicher – poet, 2019, 2021
- Souvankham Thammavongsa – fiction, 2021–2023
- Paul Theroux – fiction writer, 1979–2019
- Wayne Thiebaud – artist, 1994–2021
- Benedict Thielen – fiction, 1939, 1948
- Louisa Thomas – staff writer, 2007, 2016–2025
- Adam Douglas Thompson – cartoonist, 2020–2022, 2024
- Andrea Thompson – reporter, 2010
- Charles Willis Thompson – reporter, 1925
- Mark Thompson – cartoonist, 2015–2020
- Nicholas Thompson – editor, 2010–2016
- James Thurber – cartoonist, cover artist, essayist and short story writer, 1927–1950s, 2019
- Judith Thurman – critic, staff writer, 1987–2021
- Tiger (pseudonym) – writer, 1925
- Kim Tingley – reporter, 2013
- Barney Tobey – cartoonist, 1938
- Mark Todd – illustrator, 1994–2000
- Colm Tóibín – fiction, 1995–2016
- Olga Tokarczuk – fiction, 2020–2021, 2024
- Jia Tolentino – staff writer, 2016–2024
- Tatyana Tolstaya – fiction, 1990, 2016
- Colin Tom – cartoonist, 2020–2025
- John W. Tomac – cover artist and illustrator, 2017–2023
- Adrian Tomine – cartoonist, cover artist and illustrator, 1994–2023
- Calvin Tomkins – arts & culture writer, 1960–2021
- Jeffrey Toobin – legal reporter, staff writer, 1993–2020
- Tom Toro – cartoonist, 2010, 2013–2019, 2021, 2023, 2025
- Mónica de la Torre – poet, 2015
- Justin Torres – writer, 2016
- Michael Torres – poet, 2021
- Touré – cultural critic
- Caroline Tracey – reporter, 2023
- Matthew Trammell – reporter, 2015–2017
- Paul Tran – poet, 2017, 2020–2021, 2023–2025
- Deborah Treisman – critic, 1998–2018
- William Trevor – fiction writer, 1977–
- Calvin Trillin – essayist (especially on food) and humorist, staff writer, 1963–1991, 1993–2022
- George W. S. Trow – essayist, novelist, playwright, and media critic, 1967–1992, 1997–1998
- John R. Tunis (pseudonym: J. R. T.) – writer, 1925
- Chase Twichell – poet, 2014, 2022
- Nicola Twilley – writer, 2014–2022
- Mike Twohy – illustrator, 2010–2017
- Kenneth Tynan – theatre critic, 1979, 2022
- Ngozi Ukazu – illustrator, 2020
- Lyudmila Ulitskaya – fiction, 2014, 2023
- Mark Ulriksen – cover artist and illustrator, 1993–2021
- Tomi Um – illustrator, 2019–2020, 2023
- Tomi Ungerer – illustrator, 1998–2004
- John Updike – fiction writer, poet, essayist, 1954–2009, 2019
- Lee Upton – poet, 2015
- Ian Urbina – journalist, 2021–2024
- Antonio Uve – illustrator, 2022
- Jean Valentine – poet, 1969–2021
- Van Bibber III (pseudonym) – writer, 1925
- Benoît van Innis – cover artist, illustrator, 1990–2021
- Lara Vapnyar – fiction writer, 2016–2017
- Riccardo Vecchio – illustrator, 1994–2024
- Sasha Velour – cover artist, 2023
- Andrea Ventura – illustrator, 1994
- James Verini – journalist, 2015
- Klaas Verplancke – illustrator, 2017
- P. C. Vey – cartoonist, 2010–2025
- Dean Vietor – illustrator, 1986
- Elisabeth Vincentelli – reporter, 2019–2022
- Thomas Vinciguerra – reporter
- Milton Viorst – reporter, 1987–1992
- Eugenia Viti – illustrator, 2022
- Lorenzo Vitturi – photographer, 2017
- Frank Viva – cover artist, 2010–2022
- Ellen Bryant Voigt – poet, 2013
- Ocean Vuong – poet, 2015–2017, 2019, 2024

== W–Wi ==
- T. H. W. – writer, 1925
- Mark Wagenaar – poet, 2015
- David Wagoner – poet, 2010
- Betty Wahl – writer, 1950
- Evan Waite – humorist, 2017–2021
- Adelle Waldman – critic, 2013–2016
- Katy Waldman – staff writer, 2018–2025
- Andrea Walker – critic, 2005–2014
- Kara Walker – cover artist, 2007
- Benjamin Wallace-Wells – staff writer, 2006, 2008, 2015–2025
- Elsa Walsh – staff writer, 1996–2007
- Liam Francis Walsh – illustrator, 2013–2019, 2022
- Weike Wang – writer, 2018–2019
- Chris Ware – cartoonist, cover artist, 1999–2022
- Kim Warp – cartoonist, 2013–2019, 2021
- Robert Penn Warren – poet, 1965–1985
- Rosanna Warren – poet, 1989, 1998–2000, 2002–2004, 2006–2008, 2012, 2016, 2019, 2021, 2023–2025
- Sofia Warren – cartoonist, 2017–2021, 2023, 2025
- Esther Watson – illustrator, 1994–2000
- Robert N. Watson – poet, 2013
- Arthur Watts – illustrator, 1925
- Teddy Wayne – humorist, 2010–2025
- Robert Weber – cartoonist, 1962–2007, 2019
- Joseph Wechsberg – writer, 1950
- William Weer – writer, 1925–1926
- Wei Tchou – reporter, 2016–2017
- Jonah Weiner – reporter, 2012–2014
- Robyn Weintraub – crosswords, 2020–2023
- Jessica Weisberg – reporter, 2009–2018
- Well Known Broker (pseudonym) – finance, 1925
- Daniel Wenger – reporter, 2015–2017
- Josh Wertz – cartoonist, 2015
- Julia Wertz – cartoonist, 2015
- Lawrence Weschler – journalist, staff writer, 1981–2002
- Christopher Weyant – cartoonist, 2010–2021
- Oliver Whang – reporter, 2021–2022
- John Ogden Whedon – writer, 1928–1938
- André Wheeler – reporter, 2021
- Shannon Wheeler – cartoonist, 2010–2019
- Susan Wheeler – poet, 2010
- Matt Whitaker – humorist, 2019
- Rogers E. M. Whitaker – essayist, railroad writer, a.k.a. E.M. Frimbo
- E. B. White (pseudonym: E. B. W.) – essayist, editor and pathfinder, 1925–1976, 2000
- Katharine Sergeant Angell White – fiction editor and writer, 1925–1960
- Colson Whitehead – fiction, 2008–2021
- Gary J. Whitehead – poet, 2010, 2013–2019
- Dorothy Wickenden – executive editor, staff writer, 1996, 2006–2009, 2012, 2015–2024
- Zoë Wicomb – writer, 2013
- Lizzie Widdicombe – writer, 2006–2019
- Reeves Wiedeman – writer, 2010–2019
- Sophia Wiedeman – cartoonist, 2021
- Anna Wiener – writer, 2016–2022
- Richard Wilbur – poet, 1948–
- Wendell Wilcox – reporter and short–story writer, 1937–1956
- Amy Wilentz – writer, 1994–
- H. C. Wilentz – reporter, 2017–2018, 2024
- Hugh Wiley – advisory editor, 1925
- Alec Wilkinson – writer, 1980–2017
- Gilbert Wilkinson – cartoonist, 1925
- C. K. Williams – poet, 2010
- Joy Williams – fiction, 2015–2016, 2018–2020
- K. Leander Williams – reporter, 2018, 2022–2023
- Paige Williams – staff writer, 2013–2025
- Phillip B. Williams – poet, 2021
- Thomas Chatterton Williams – writer, 2017
- Wilton Williams – cartoonist, 1925
- Elizabeth Willis – poet, 2015
- Ellen Willis – pop music critic, 1968–1975, 2020
- Sean Wilsey – writer, 2005–2013
- A. E. Wilson – cover artist, 1925
- Edmund Wilson – literary critic, 1950–
- Gahan Wilson – cartoonist, 2009–2019
- Jennifer Wilson – staff writer, 2016, 2020, 2022–2025
- Sterling Wilson (pseudonym: S. W.?) – writer, 1925
- Christian Wiman – poet, 2007, 2009, 2018–2019, 2021, 2023–2024
- Ronald Wimberly – cover artist, illustrator, 2020–2022
- Herbert Warren Wind – essayist, golf historian and journalist, 1941–1990
- Paul Windle – illustrator, 2017–2019
- Jim Windolf – humourist, 2000–2013
- Dr. Winkle (pseudonym) – reporter, 1925
- Natalie Wise – poet, 2015
- Ben Wiseman – illustrator, 2016
- Emily Witt – staff writer, 2015–2023
- Stephen Witt – journalist, 2022
- John Witte – poet, 2014
- Michael Witte – illustrator 1989–1998

== Wo–Z ==
- James Wolcott – television critic
- Susanna Wolff – humorist, 2015, 2021
- Tobias Wolff – short story writer, 1995–2014
- Rose Wong – illustrator, 2021–2022
- James Wood – literary critic, staff writer, 1996, 1998, 2000–2001, 2003, 2005, 2007–2025
- Lawson Wood – cartoonist, 1925
- Wilfrid Wood – illustrator, 2015
- Amy Woolard – poet, 2018–2022
- Alexander Woollcott – advisory editor, writer, theatre critic, 1925–1939
- Franz Wright – poet
- Lawrence Wright – staff writer, 1992–1996, 1998, 2002–2004, 2006–2015, 2017, 2019–2023
- Robin Wright – contributing writer, 1988–2022
- Mark Wunderlich – poet, 2021
- Elizabeth Wurtzel – cultural critic and author, 1991–1992
- Wx (pseudonym) – writer, 1925
- Philip G. Wylie – poet, 1926–1930
- Elena Xausa – illustrator, 2019, 2021
- Joshua Yaffa – Moscow correspondent, writer, 2013–2023
- Yahoo (pseudonym) – reporter, 1925
- Yi Mun-yol – writer, 2011
- Emily Jungmin Yoon – poet, 2017, 2021
- JooHee Yoon – illustrator, 2021
- Paul Yoon – fiction, 2023–2024
- Monica Youn – poet, 2015–2016
- Dean Young – poet, 2013
- Kevin Young – poet, 2016
- Ray Young Bear – poet, 2015
- Briana Younger – reporter, 2019–2020
- Adam Zagajewski – poet, 2021
- Olimpia Zagnoli – illustrator, 2018
- Oussama Zahr – reporter, 2019, 2021–2024
- Daniel Zalewski – features editor and non–fiction writer
- Alejandro Zambra – fiction writer, 2022
- Cynthia Zarin – poet, 1983–2021
- Zha Jianying – writer, 2010
- Naaman Zhou – reporter, 2022
- Jack Ziegler – cartoonist, 2006–2019, 2021
- Mark Zingarelli – illustrator, 1993–1998
- Katherine Zoepf – writer, 2013
