= Funny Times (newspaper) =

American humor newspaper

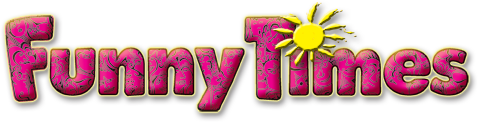
- Editor: Mia Beach
- Categories: Humor magazine
- Frequency: Monthly
- Publisher: Renae Lesser and Gabriel Piser
- Total circulation: 55,000 (2020)
- Founded: 1985
- Country: United States
- Based in: Cleveland Heights, Ohio
- Language: English
- Website: www.funnytimes.com
- ISSN: 1045-0491

Funny Times (FT) is an American humor newspaper founded in 1985, and still published as of 2023, by the wife and husband team of Susan Wolpert and Raymond Lesser. Wolpert and Lesser were inspired by The Comic News of Santa Cruz, California, "a monthly journal of progressive editorial cartoons" founded in 1984 by Thom Zajac. FT's political content is often subversive and has a progressive/liberal perspective.

In 1997, Sandee Beyerle came across the office of Funny Times while trying to escape inclement weather. She became managing editor, and when Ray Lesser retired as editor, Beyerle replaced him. After Beyerle's retirement in 2022, Mia Beach was hired as the new editor.

== Format and subscriptions ==
The monthly Funny Times publication is printed in the format of a daily newspaper, on newsprint paper, with each of the 24 pages measuring 11 X 17 inches. The only ads it runs are for its own FT-related merchandise.

In 2025, the paper launched the Funny Times Podcast. The podcast features interviews with humorists and contributors reading their pieces from the print publication on air. Guests have included Ruben Bolling, Melanie Chartoff, Dave Coverly, Bob Eckstein, Peter Kuper, P.S. Mueller, Dan Perkins, Ron Placone, Hilary B. Price, Phil Proctor, and Lenore Skenazy.

== Content ==
Each Funny Times issue is organized into sections such as "Relationships", "Dogs", "Politics", "Modern Life", and others, with the section categories varying somewhat from issue to issue. Each issue includes cartoons, columns and essays that derive humor from pop culture, current events, politics and day-to-day living. A full page in each issue is devoted to the syndicated column originally developed by Chuck Shepherd, News of the Weird, which features dozens of bizarre true stories from around the world. Publisher Ray Lesser frequently contributes his own humorous essays. As of the early 2000s, each issue contained choice selections of such offbeat comic strips as This Modern World by Tom Tomorrow, Bizarro by Dan Piraro, Zippy the Pinhead by Bill Griffith, Too Much Coffee Man by Shannon Wheeler, Tom the Dancing Bug by Ruben Bolling, The K Chronicles by Keith Knight, and Slowpoke by Jen Sorensen.

Other contributing writers and cartoonists have included, circa 2000:

- Dave Barry
- Lynda Barry
- Harry Bliss
- Andy Borowitz
- Matt Bors
- Bill Bryson
- Bruce Cameron
- Sean Chiki
- Andrei Codrescu
- Derf Backderf
- Will Durst
- Bob Eckstein
- Tim Eagen
- Mitra Farmand
- Lauren Glattly
- Martha Gradisher
- Matt Groening
- Garrison Keillor
- Keith Knight
- Paul Krassner
- Peter Kuper
- Molly Ivins
- Carol Lay
- Peter McKay
- Raymond Lesser
- Chris Monroe
- Carlos Montage
- Michael Moore
- Janet Periat
- K. A. Polzin
- Bev Potter
- Hilary B. Price
- Phil Proctor
- Ted Rall
- Rita Rudner
- Lenore Skenazy
- Terry Stawar
- Tom Toro
- P.C. Vey
- John Walsh
- Kim Warp
- Roz Warren
- Jon Winokur
- Matt Wuerker
- Alison Bechdel

As of 2021, works by a few of the above cartoonists and writers still appeared regularly in the Funny Times.

== Other publications ==
In 2002, Funny Times published the book Funny Times: The Best of The Best of American Humor: The Funniest Cartoons, Columns, and Essays from the Funny Times Newspaper (Three Rivers Press, ISBN 9780609809198). As of 2018, the book is no longer offered by FT but is still available elsewhere, secondhand.

From January 2007 to September 2013, the Funny Times website featured the "Cartoon Playground", in which anyone with Internet access could create and instantly post their own comic strips using artwork drawn by Matt Wuerker. Some of the more frequent contributors to the Playground Cartoon section included individuals going by such names as: CIAgent, Claustrophobic, cta, Danger Dan, Demosfoni, Ducky, Earthmuffin, Elephant Man, Ellie May, Eric Per1in, Fracturedfish, Hal, Just Bean, Konrad Schwoerke, Lo Bottomy, Mr Smartypants, Queen Bean, Rick Dickulous, Sophie, Yankees with Hope, and Zack. These people communicated with each other using cartoons, turning the 'Cartoon Playground' into somewhat of a social networking site. Some reader-created cartoons were, for a while, featured in the monthly print edition.

As of 2020, for several years the Funny Times website has featured the "Cartoon of the Week", which is also emailed weekly to subscribers.
