= Xausa =

Xausa is a surname. Notable people with the surname include:

- Davide Xausa (born 1976), Canadian soccer player
- Elena Xausa (1984–2022), Italian illustrator
