= Ryan Lizza =

American journalist (born 1974)

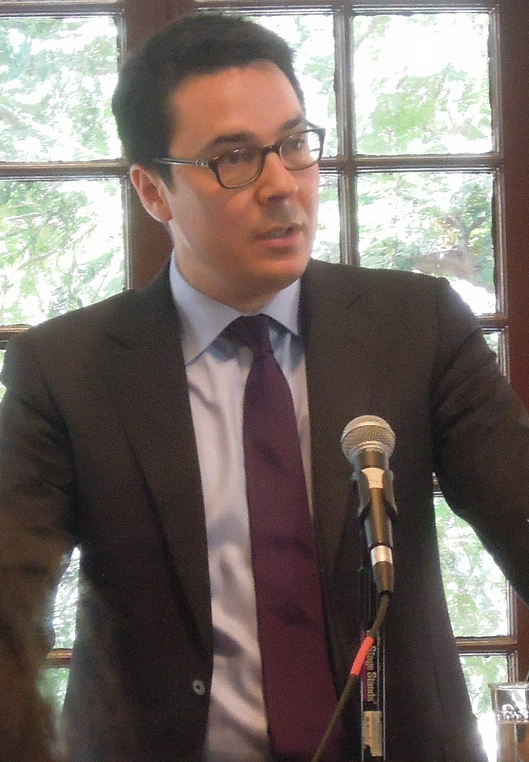
- Lizza in Kelly Writers House on March 27, 2013
- Born: Ryan Christopher Lizza; July 12, 1974 (age 51); Dix Hills, New York, U.S.
- Education: University of California, Berkeley (BA)
- Occupation: Political journalist
- Notable credits: The New Republic (1998–2007); New York magazine (2004–2006); GQ (2006–2007); The New Yorker Washington Correspondent (2007–2017); Esquire Chief Political Correspondent (2018–2019); Politico Chief Washington Correspondent (2019–2025); CNN Senior Political Analyst (2012–)
- Spouse: Christina Gillespie
- Partner: Olivia Nuzzi (engaged 2022–2024)
- Children: 2

Ryan Christopher Lizza (/ˈlɪzə/ LIZ-zə; born July 12, 1974) is an American journalist. His 2017 interview with White House Communications Director Anthony Scaramucci resulted in Scaramucci's dismissal. He was a senior political analyst for CNN and formerly the chief Washington correspondent for Politico. In 2025, he launched his independent publication on the Substack platform, Telos.

In late 2017, Lizza was accused of sexual misconduct in the context of the Me Too movement. After a decade-long run as The New Yorker's Washington correspondent, the magazine's internal review of the allegation against Lizza led to his dismissal. However, in light of their own investigations, several other media organizations including CNN, Politico, and Rolling Stone declined to terminate or bar Lizza from employment.

== Education ==
Lizza attended the Berkshire School, a private co-educational boarding school in the town of Sheffield, Massachusetts, and received his bachelor's degree from the University of California, Berkeley.

== Journalism career ==
Lizza started his career at the Center for Investigative Reporting in San Francisco, where he worked on the Emmy Award-winning Frontline documentary Hot Guns. In 1998, he joined The New Republic, where he became senior editor. From 1998 to 2007, Lizza covered President Bill Clinton's impeachment, the Florida recount in the 2000 presidential election, the George W. Bush administration, and the 2004 presidential election. In 2004, he also wrote about politics for The Atlantic, including one of the first national magazine profiles of Barack Obama. From 2004 to 2006, Lizza was a contributing editor for New York magazine, where he wrote about national politics. In 2006 and 2007, Lizza was also a correspondent for GQ. From 2002 to 2007, Lizza regularly contributed to The New York Times.

In 2004, The Washington Post described Lizza as part of the latest "crop of younger journalists who grab the attention of the media establishment through dogged reporting, sparkling writing or provocative analysis."

In 2007, Lizza became the Washington correspondent for The New Yorker, where he covered the White House, three presidential elections (2008, 2012, and 2016), the administrations of George W. Bush, Barack Obama, and Donald Trump, and wrote the magazine's "Letter From Washington" column. Lizza covered the 2008 U.S. presidential election for The New Yorker, and wrote an extended profile of Obama's career in Illinois politics. During the campaign, a cartoon in the New Yorker allegedly caused the Obama campaign to exclude Lizza from Obama's campaign plane, with a lack of space cited as the reason. In 2017, Lizza was fired from The New Yorker in relation to an allegation of sexual harassment.

On December 17, 2018, Publishers Marketplace reported that Lizza and Olivia Nuzzi, the Washington correspondent for New York magazine, were writing a "coauthored account of the 2020 presidential campaign" for Avid Reader Press, an imprint of Simon & Schuster.

On August 30, 2019, in a note to staff, Carrie Budoff Brown, Politico’s editor, and Matthew Kaminski, Politico’s Editor-in-Chief, announced that Lizza was joining Politico as Chief Washington Correspondent.

Lizza left Politico in 2025 to launch his own Substack publication,Telos.

== Sexual misconduct allegation ==
On December 11, 2017, The New Yorker fired Lizza, saying that he engaged in "improper sexual conduct". Lizza called The New Yorker's characterization a "terrible mistake" that had been "made hastily and without a full investigation of the relevant facts". The woman on the other side of the allegations supported the magazine's version of the events; in a statement, her attorney, Douglas Wigdor, said, "[I]n no way did Mr. Lizza’s misconduct constitute a 'respectful relationship' as he has now tried to characterize it."

Lizza was temporarily suspended by CNN pending an investigation; six weeks later, the network announced that its "extensive investigation" had yielded "no reason to continue to keep Mr. Lizza off the air". Politico, Rolling Stone, and other media organizations were later said to have reached similar conclusions during their investigations, determining not to bar Lizza from employment.

== Awards ==
In 2008, Lizza was a finalist for the National Magazine Award for Reporting, which "honors the enterprise, exclusive reporting, and intelligent analysis that a magazine exhibits in covering an event, a situation, or a problem of contemporary interest and significance".

In June 2009, The Washingtonian included Lizza on its list of Washington's "50 Top Journalists" and described him as a writer who "change[s] the way readers see the world". That same year, his profile of President Barack Obama was nominated for a National Magazine Award.

In 2011, Lizza received an Everett McKinley Dirksen Award for Distinguished Reporting on Congress Honorable Mention and Toner Prize for Excellence in Political Reporting Honorable Mention for his reporting on Congress's failed attempt to pass climate legislation.

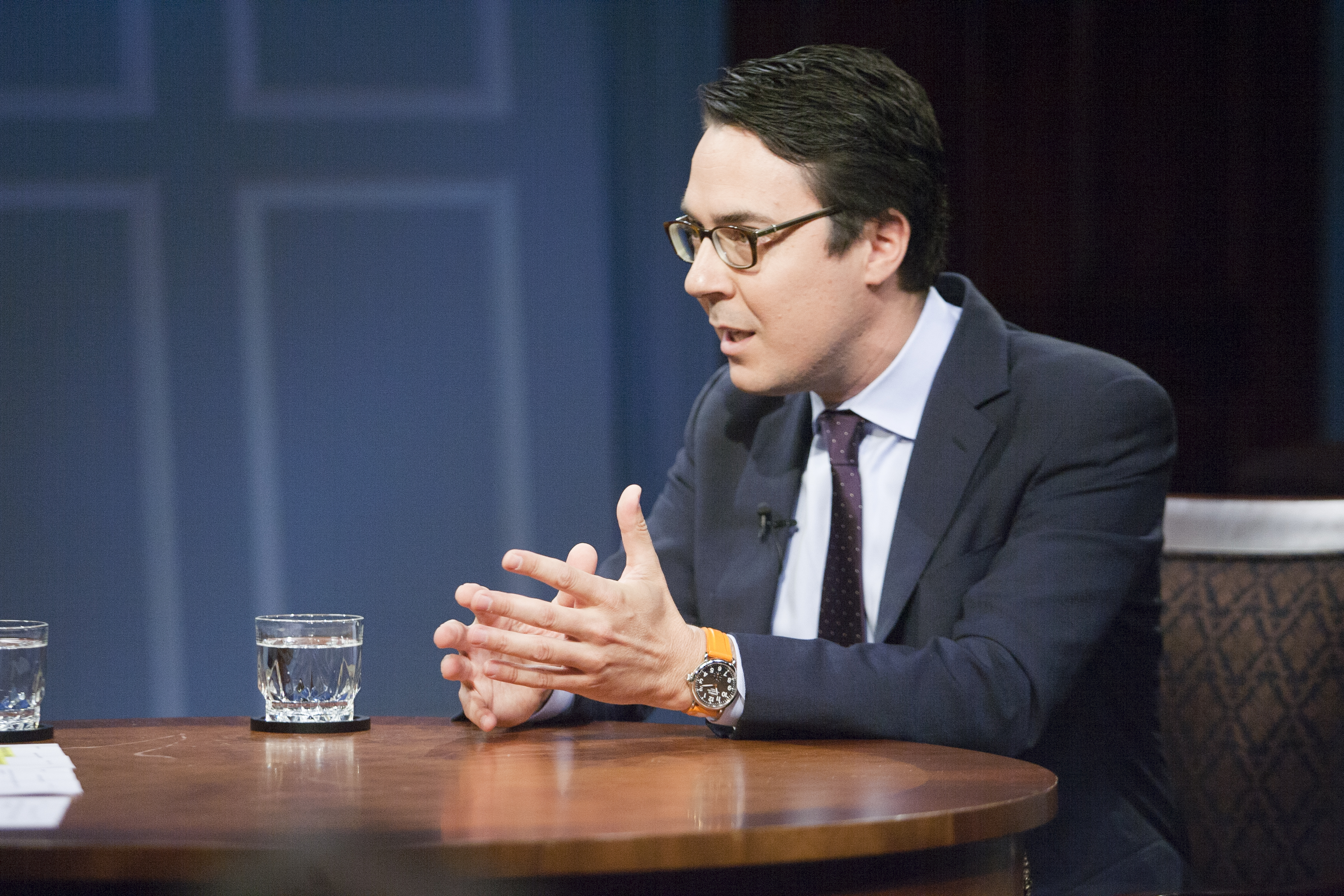
Lizza at the Miller Center of Public Affairs in 2015

In 2012, Lizza won the Edwin M. Hood Award for Diplomatic Correspondence "for his coverage of the U.S. foreign policy battles during the 'Arab Spring.'"

On April 27, 2013, the White House Correspondents' Association presented Lizza with the Aldo Beckman Award for Journalistic Excellence "for his remarkable efforts to provide an independent perspective on President Barack Obama's presidency and re-election."

In 2015, Lizza was a finalist for the Newhouse School Mirror Award competition honoring excellence in media industry reporting (Best Single Article, Digital Media).

Lizza's writing was included in the 2003, 2004, 2006, 2007, 2008, and 2009 editions of The Best American Political Writing.

== Personal life ==
Lizza, a Washington, D.C. resident was married for 11 years to Christina Gillespie, a doctor and former UC Berkeley classmate. He has two children.

In September 2022, Lizza became engaged to New York magazine correspondent Olivia Nuzzi. On September 20, 2024, he confirmed that they were no longer engaged. The breakup of the engagement was rumored online to be because of her affair on the campaign trail with former presidential candidate Robert F. Kennedy Jr. To avoid any implication of bias or conflict of interest, Lizza suspended coverage of Kennedy Jr. in response to the sensational reports regarding the alleged Nuzzi affair with the candidate.

In November 2025, Lizza began publishing personal accounts about how he learned of Nuzzi's affair with Kennedy, and alleged that Nuzzi had also had an affair with Republican presidential candidate Mark Sanford.

== See also ==
- List of The New Yorker contributors
- List of CNN personnel
