= Clarence Knapp =

American writer

Clarence Hollister Knapp (1877–1961) was an American humorist and a frequent contributor to The New Yorker magazine.

== Personal ==
Clarence Knapp was born in Saratoga Springs, New York on October 10, 1877. He attended school in Saratoga Springs, graduating from Saratoga Springs High School. He graduated from Cornell University in 1903, and Albany Law School in 1906. He moved to New York City, where he wrote for the New York Evening Mail before returning to Saratoga Springs.

In 1910 he married Edna Porter, and the couple had a daughter, June.

Clarence Knapp died on September 13, 1961 in Saratoga Springs.

== Writing ==
Knapp is best known for his "Sob Ballads"—humorous verses written as song lyrics—that appeared in The New Yorker from the 1920s through the 1940s. A few of these were collected in a book Sob Ballads in 1930. He also contributed material to Franklin P. Adams' newspaper column "The Conning Tower" (as Ambrose Glutz).

== Other ==
Knapp served two terms as mayor of Saratoga Springs from 1924 to 1927.

== The Three Musketeers ==
Clarence Knapp was associated with long-time friends Monty Woolley and Frank Sullivan, known as "The Three Musketeers". He was known as "Nuggy Knapp", a nickname he was given in college.
