= Tom Funk (illustrator) =

American illustrator

- Born: Merton Thompson Funk; July 18, 1911; Brooklyn, New York, U.S.
- Died: October 9, 2003 (aged 92); Norwalk, Connecticut, U.S.
- Occupation: Illustrator
- Spouse: Edna Eicke
- Relatives: Charles Earle Funk (uncle); Isaac K. Funk (great-uncle)

Tom Funk (July 18, 1911 – October 9, 2003), born Merton Thompson Funk, was an illustrator who for some 40 years was associated with the distinctive visual style of the New Yorker magazine.

== Biography ==
Funk was born in Brooklyn, the son of Merton Layton Funk and Marion Anna Thompson Funk. His father was a doctor; his uncle, Charles Earle Funk, was editor of the Funk & Wagnalls Dictionary and other publications. Another uncle, J. Arthur Funk, was a Presbyterian medical missionary in Iran. Isaac K. Funk and Wilfred J. Funk were also close relatives. He graduated from Poly Prep Country Day School in Brooklyn, and attended Amherst College.

Funk contributed ‘spots’ to the New Yorker magazine for forty years, depicting New York buildings, portraits for profiles of subjects ranging from Pablo Picasso to D. T. Suzuki, and a distinctive style of cartography, as well as general illustrations in the years before the magazine introduced editorial photographs, in the 1990s. His work also appeared in Dramatists Guild Quarterly, Harper's, Woman's Day, Gourmet, House & Garden and Life, and he illustrated books and activity kits for children, as well as textbooks and many cookbooks.

Funk married Alice Cecelie Owre in 1939. They divorced in 1940. In 1943 he married the New Yorker cover illustrator Edna Eicke, who died in 1979. He was survived by three children when he died in 2003, in Norwalk, Connecticut, at the age of 92.

== Publications ==
=== As author ===
- I Read Signs (1962, author and illustrator)

=== As illustrator ===
- Charles Earle Funk, A Hog on Ice and Other Curious Expressions (1948)
- Rachel Learnard, Mrs. Roo and the Bunnies (1953)
- Ruth Crawford Seeger, Let's Build a Railroad (1954)
- Charles Earle Funk, Heavens to Betsy! and Other Curious Sayings (1955)
- Hamilton Basso, A Quota of Seaweed: Persons and Places in Brazil, Spain, Honduras, Jamaica, Tahiti and Samoa (1960)
- John McPhee, Rising from the Plains (1986, endpapers)
