= Eating the Cheshire Cat =

2000 novel by Helen Ellis

- Author: Helen Ellis
- Publisher: Scribner Book Company
- Publication date: January 1, 2000
- ISBN: 978-0-684-86440-2

Eating the Cheshire Cat is a 2000 novel by Helen Ellis. It follows three girls from Alabama—Sarina, Nicole, and Bitty Jack—as they grow up.
