= JM Holmes =

American fiction writer

- Education: University of Iowa
- Writing career
- Genre: Fiction
- Notable work: How Are You Going to Save Yourself

JM Holmes is an American writer. He is the author of the short story collection How Are You Going to Save Yourself. His stories have appeared in The New Yorker, The Paris Review and The Missouri Review.

== Literary career ==
Holmes graduated with an MFA in fiction from the Iowa Writers' Workshop. His debut book, an interlinked short story collection titled How Are You Going to Save Yourself, was published by Little, Brown in 2018. Its protagonists are four young black men in Rhode Island who navigate masculinity, friendship and violence.

The Guardian called the stories "raucous, heartbreaking, bawdy tales," and NPR "a shockingly powerful debut collection from a writer whose talent seems almost limitless." Entertainment Weekly hailed it as "a game-changing book on race and masculinity," writing: "Particularly in coming-of-age fiction, dialogue can be a liability; quips can mask nuance, and realism is aspired to far more often than it's reached. But dialogue is the engine, the power, of How Are You Going to Save Yourself."

The Irish Times described it as "layered and occasionally unsettling," noting that "it is not a collection without flaws, some of which have a tendency to drag down otherwise vibrant tales. Holmes switches clumsily between characters in his stories, diluting the power of scenes." Booklist argued that Holmes' decision to not "shy away from difficult subject matter or from showing his characters' flaws" makes for "some incredibly tough scenes to read, but also highlights the everyday travails of black men in America."

In 2026, he published his novel Me and Mine.

== Publications ==
- How Are You Going to Save Yourself (Little, Brown, 2018)
