= Elizabeth Cullinan =

Irish-American writer (1933–2020)

- Born: 7 June 1933; New York City, U.S.
- Died: 26 January 2020 (aged 86); Towson, Maryland, U.S.
- Occupation: Writer
- Writing career
- Genre: Fiction
- Notable works: House of Gold (1970), The Time of Adam (1971), Yellow Roses (1977), A Change of Scene (1982)
- Notable awards: Houghton Mifflin Literary Fellowship Award

Elizabeth Irene Cullinan (7 June 1933 – 26 January 2020) was an Irish–American writer who started her career as a typist at The New Yorker magazine, which published her stories from 1960 to 1981. She produced two short story collections, The Time of Adam (1971) and Yellow Roses (1977), and two novels, House of Gold (1970) and A Change of Scene (1982). Cullinan was not well-known but her modest output earned her "outsize acclaim" from her contemporaries, including Joyce Carol Oates, and comparisons to Chekhov and Joyce. Her work centred primarily on working class Irish-Americans, Catholicism and "women keen to avoid the lives their mothers had". She won the Houghton Mifflin Literary Fellowship Award and received grants from the National Endowment for the Arts and the Carnegie Fund.

== Early life ==
Cullinan was born on 7 June 1933 in The Bronx, New York City, to Cornelius and Irene (née O'Connell) Cullinan. She had two sisters, Margaret Mary and Claire. She was educated at St. Raymond's grammar school, in the Academy of Mount St. Ursula, a convent school in The Bronx and won a scholarship to Marymount College on the Upper East Side of Manhattan. She graduated from there in 1954. Due to her father's financial difficulties, the family had to move in with her maternal grandmother.

== Career ==
Cullinan started working at The New Yorker at age 22, initially as a typist. She typed up manuscripts by authors such as John Updike, James Thurber and E.B. White. She became secretary to William Maxwell, one of the magazine's fiction editors, who told her to "go and be a writer". She began publishing her short stories in The New Yorker in 1960. Her first story was called The Ablutions and was published on 29 January 1960. She continued to publish in The New Yorker until 1981.

She lived in Dublin, Ireland from 1961 to 1963 and her time there inspired her novel House of Gold (1970), which won the Houghton Mifflin Literary Fellowship Award. Her stories set in Ireland cast a critical eye and avoided "migrant-return myths". Her short story The Swim tells of a day trip to the beach with an Irish writer, likely John McGahern with whom she had a relationship. She befriended Irish writer Mary Lavin and their relationship is celebrated in her short story Maura's Friends.

She published two collections of short stories, The Time of Adam (1971) and Yellow Roses (1977), and two novels, House of Gold (1970) and A Change of Scene (1982). At the time of her death, she had completed a third novel, Starting From Scratch, a fictionalised account of her time at The New Yorker.

Cullinan received grants from the National Endowment for the Arts and the Carnegie Fund. She taught at Fordham University, the University of Massachusetts, and the Iowa Writers’ Workshop at the University of Iowa.

=== Critical response ===
Though never well-known in Ireland or the United States, her modest output "earned her outsize critical acclaim", including comparisons to Chekhov and Joyce. According to a review by author Joyce Carol Oates, "Miss Cullinan is always intelligent, precise and skillful, turning out stories of near‐faultless craftsmanship."

On 9 April 2024, Fordham University hosted a panel discussion of her life and work to mark the re-issue of Yellow Roses. Panelists included novelists Peter Quinn and Mary Gordon, Fordham's Chair of Irish Studies Keri Walsh, and Angela Alaimo O’Donnell of Fordham’s Curran Center for American Catholic Studies.

=== Themes in her work ===
Cullinan's work centres on the lives of working class Irish-Americans, many of them based in Manhattan and The Bronx, and the concerns of "newly post-Vatican II Irish American Catholics". Her fiction explores Catholics grappling with the sexual revolution and the tensions between a still-pious older generation and young people alienated from religion in a secular world.

Several stories explore the changing roles of women in the 1960s. Many of her characters are Manhattan women with careers, who reject domesticity and find work "creative and sustaining". According to Professor Patricia Coughlan of University College Cork, Cullinan "resists assumptions that women’s concerns and experience are supplementary to men’s". She helped redefine Irish-American literature, moving away from the male tradition of "ward bosses and henchmen".

== Later life and death ==
Cullinan moved to Towson, Maryland in 2015 to be closer to family. She died from lung disease on 26 January 2020 at a retirement community there, aged 86 and is buried in Gate of Heaven Cemetery in Valhalla, N.Y.

== Works ==
=== Novels ===
- House of Gold (1970)
- A Change of Scene (1982)

=== Short story collections ===
- The Time of Adam (1971)
- Yellow Roses (1977)

=== Short stories ===
Title	Publication	Collected in
"The Ablutions"	The New Yorker (6 February 1960)	The Time of Adam
"The Voices of the Dead"	The New Yorker (16 April 1960)	Yellow Roses
"Le Petit Déjeuner"	The New Yorker (13 August 1960)	The Time of Adam
"The Time of Adam"	The New Yorker (10 September 1960)	The Time of Adam
"The Power of Prayer"	The New Yorker (7 January 1961)	The Time of Adam
"The Reunion"	The New Yorker (18 February 1961)	The Time of Adam
"The Nightingale"	The New Yorker (30 December 1961)	The Time of Adam
"A Swim"	The New Yorker (5 June 1965)	The Time of Adam
"The Old Priest"	The New Yorker (18 December 1965)	The Time of Adam
"A Sunday Like the Others"	The New Yorker (26 August 1967)	The Time of Adam
"Sleep"	The New Yorker (1 June 1968)	-
"Maura's Friends" aka "Nora's Friends"	The New Yorker (29 August 1970)	The Time of Adam
"Only Human"	The New Yorker (6 February 1971)	Yellow Roses
"Yellow Roses"	The New Yorker (4 March 1972)	Yellow Roses
"In the Summerhouse"	The New Yorker (8 July 1972)	Yellow Roses
"The Perfect Crime"	The New Yorker (27 August 1973)	Yellow Roses
"An Accident"	The New Yorker (27 May 1974)	Yellow Roses
"The Sun and Substance"	Shenandoah (Summer 1975)	Yellow Roses
"Life After Death"	The New Yorker (26 January 1976)	Yellow Roses
"Estelle"	The New Yorker (19 April 1976)	Yellow Roses
"A Story in the Key of C"	The New Yorker (7 June 1976)	Yellow Roses
"Idioms"	The New Yorker (31 January 1977)	-
"A Foregone Conclusion"	Yellow Roses (April 1977)	Yellow Roses
"Dreaming"	Yellow Roses (April 1977)	Yellow Roses
"A Good Loser"	The New Yorker (15 August 1977)	-
"Echoes"	The New Yorker (15 June 1981)	-
"Commuting"	Irish Literary Supplement (Spring 1983)	-
"The Black Diamond"	Threshold (Winter 1983/84)	-
"In Passing"	Colorado Review (1995)	-
