= Christina Malman =

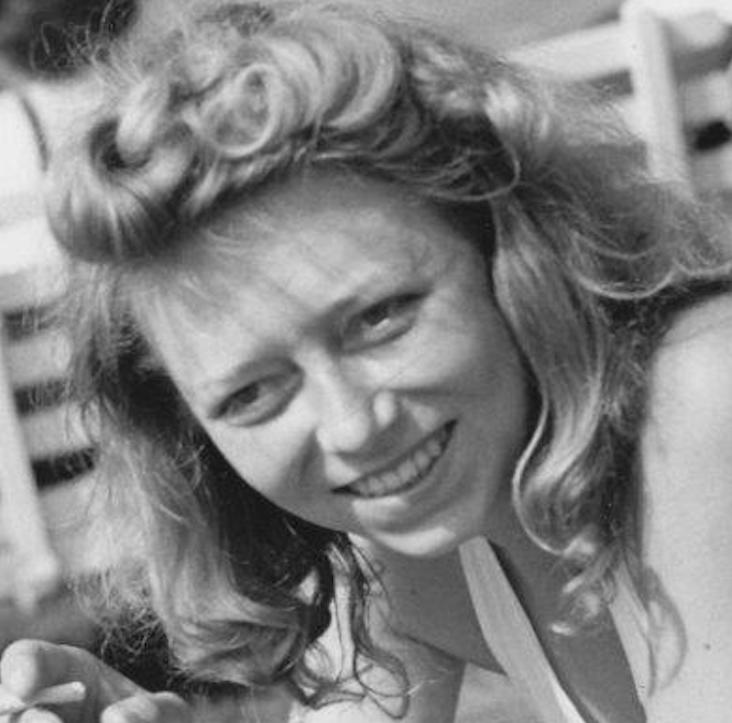
- Born: 2 December 1912; Southampton, England
- Died: 14 January 1959 (aged 46); New York
- Occupation(s): Artist, illustrator
- Spouse: Dexter Masters

Christina Malman (2 December 1912 – 14 January 1959) was an artist and illustrator, best known for her work for The New Yorker magazine.

== Biography ==
Malman was born in Southampton, England, daughter of a ship's captain for the Hamburg American line. The family settled in Brooklyn, New York, when she was two years old.

In 1933 she won the Walter Scott Perry scholarship to the School Of Fine And Applied Arts at Pratt Institute. Less than four years later, the New York Times announced that she was exhibiting water colours at the Macy Galleries in Manhattan. More than two decades of prolific output followed this exhibition. For The New Yorker alone, she did dozens of covers and hundreds of "spots" - small, captionless drawings - scattered throughout the magazine. Other journals that published her work included Consumer Reports, Cue, Charm, Promenade, and Fiction Parade.

Malman drew many figures from theatre and politics, among them Helen Hayes, Neville Chamberlain, Thomas E Dewey, Gertrude Lawrence, Robert Moses, Kurt Weill, Joan Crawford, Moritz Rosenthal, Harold L. Ickes, Fanny Brice (as Baby Snooks). In the years after the Macy Galleries exhibit, she exhibited at the Metropolitan Museum, Museum of the City of New York, and the Art Students League; painted a mural for Cafe Society, and illustrated books and pamphlets, including works for the US World War II effort.

In 2017 her 1935 drawing Woman and a Dog was exhibited as part of Ellen DeGeneres Selects at the Cooper Hewitt, Smithsonian Design Museum. In 1941, she married the writer Dexter Masters. She died of unknown causes at the age of 46.

The Cooper Hewitt Smithsonian Museum houses a large collection of her works. The largest collection is owned by her executor, Joan Brady. Condé Nast owns the copyrights to much of her published work in the New Yorker.

== Critical assessment ==
"Malman masterfully utilizes positive and negative space to create simplified forms that are at once sleekly modern and yet familiar...[combining] graphic legibility and clever plumbing of abstraction...As viewers, one has the sense that the figures are caught in a fleeting moment of stillness." Caroline O'Connell, Smithsonian Design Museum.

"She was one of the most distinguished and original artists that the magazine has been privileged to publish...She has created her own memorial, for these [covers and drawings] will certainly live on for always." Katharine Sergeant Angell White, writer and fiction editor for The New Yorker 1925–1960.

"The interior black-and-whites are splendid things, ranging from figure essays in pattern and density to arch, even bleak, character studies." Prof D B Dowd, Art and American Culture Studies, Washington University.

== Published works: illustrations and covers ==
- Wright, Alexander. How to Live Without a Woman. Illustrations by Malman. New York: Bobbs-Merrill, 1937. (Digitized 2008).
- White, E B E. B. White. Quo Vadimus? Cover by Malman. New York: Harper, 1939.
- Holland, Henrietta Fort. My Own Manhattan. Artwork by Malman. New York: Ives Washburn, 1946.
- Beim, Lorraine. Carol's Side of the Street. Illustrations by Malman. New York: Harcourt, Brace and Co, 1952.
- Masters, Dexter. The Intelligent Buyer's Guide to Sellers. Illustrations by Malman. New York: Consumer's Union, 1965.
- Masters, Dexter. The Intelligent Buyer and the Telltale Seller. Illustrations by Malman. New York: Knopf, 1966.
