= Sarah Akinterinwa =

- Born: 1994 or 1995 (age 30–31); Kent, England, U.K.
- Occupations: Artist and cartoonist
- Years active: 2020–present
- Known for: Oyin and Kojo (comic series)

Sarah Akinterinwa (1994/1995) is a British artist, illustrator, and cartoonist. She is best known for her comic series Oyin and Kojo. She is the first Black British woman to be a cartoonist for The New Yorker.

== Career ==
Akinterinwa was born and raised in Kent, England to Nigerian immigrant parents. She enjoyed drawing from childhood, and although she didn't pursue a career in art, she continued to draw as a hobby.

She studied to be an educational mental health practitioner but left to work at a preschool owned by her mother. However, the business closed after the onset of the COVID-19 pandemic in April 2020. Then unemployed and home for social distancing restrictions, she created the single-panel comic Oyin and Kojo centered on the lives of a Black British couple, and posted them on her Instagram. She said she was inspired to create the comic due to the lack of representations of Black British couples in the media. An editor for The New Yorker saw her work online and invited her to be a contributor for the magasine. Akinterinwa is the first Black British woman to be a cartoonist for The New Yorker.

She has since become a full-time artist and illustrator. Akinterinwa named Amanda Oleander and Issa Rae as two of her biggest influences. Her work has appeared in The Los Angeles Times and The Guardian. In 2022 her work was shown in an exhibition alongside the work of Mary Darly at the Cartoon Museum. Also in 2022 she created the comic series Body Equality for the Wellcome Collection that focused on marginalised bodies.

She published her debut book, an illustrated dating guide Why You'll Never Find the One: And Why It Doesn't Matter in February 2023 under Princeton Architectural Press. She based the book on her personal experiences and those of her friends.

== Personal life ==
Akinterinwa resides in London.

== Bibliography ==
- 2023. Why You'll Never Find the One: And Why It Doesn't Matter. Princeton Architectural Press, ISBN 9781797222530.
