= Nick Downes =

American cartoonist

Nick Downes is an American cartoonist who works mostly with single-panel comics, often on the subject of science. His work has appeared in The New Yorker, Playboy, Punch, Private Eye, National Lampoon, Barron's, The Spectator, Wall Street Journal and many other publications in the U.S. and the U.K. He has been a regular contributor to the Oldie magazine since it was founded in 1992. The Art Institute of Chicago holds four of his cartoons.

Four collections of his work have been published:

- Big Science, AAAS Press, 1992.
- Whatever Happened to 'Eureka'?, Rutgers University Press, 1994
- Polly Wants A Lawyer! Cartoons of Murder, Mayhem and Criminal Mischief, Humorist Books, 2022.
- We Came 900 Million Miles For This? , Humorist Books, 2025
