= Helen Ellis =

American writer

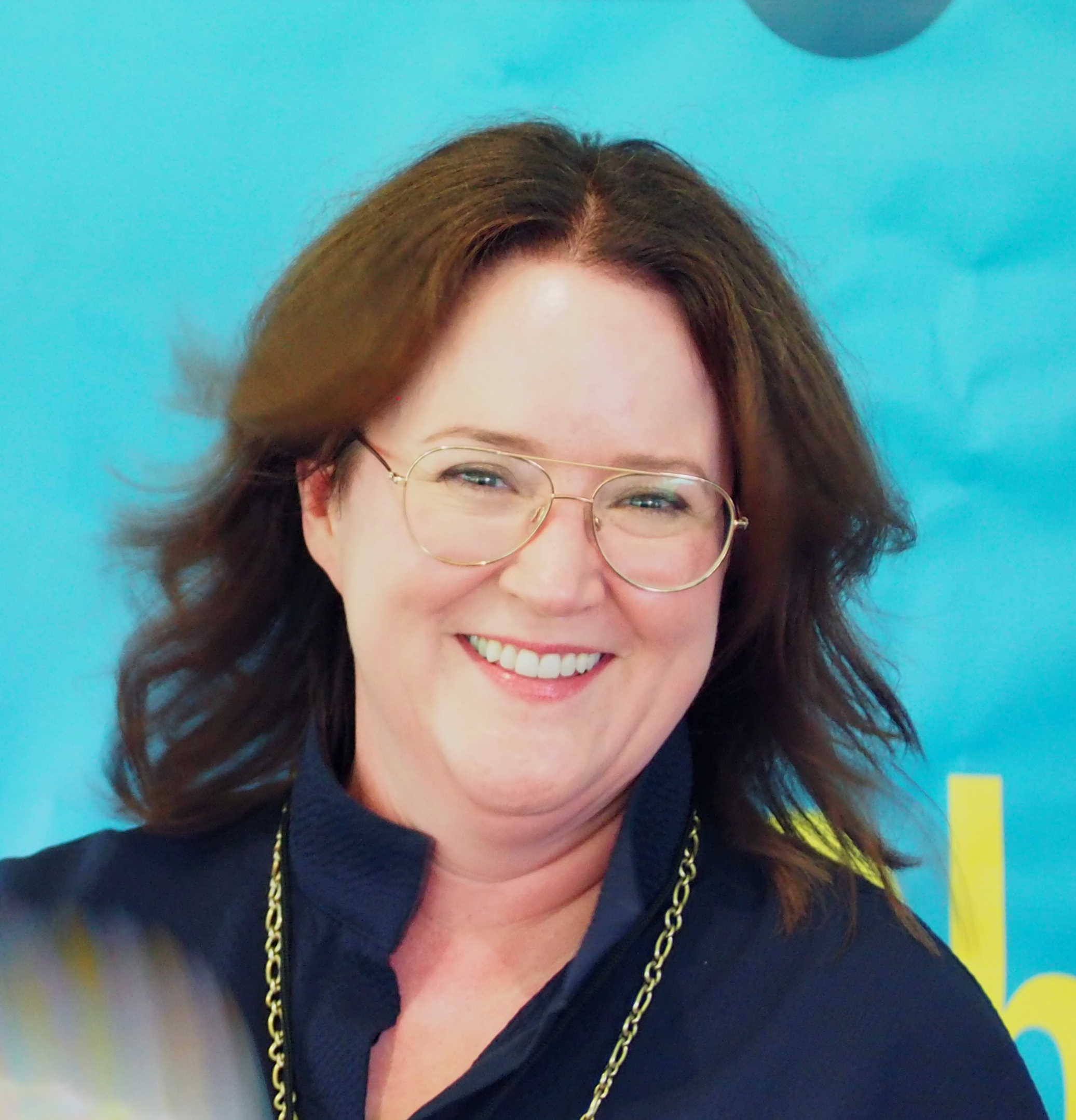
Helen Ellis

Helen Ellis is an American writer. Her books include Eating the Cheshire Cat, Bring Your Baggage and Don’t Pack Light, Southern Lady Code, American Housewife, and Kiss Me in the Coral Lounge. She is a poker player who competes on the national tournament circuit. Raised in Alabama, she lives with her husband in New York City.

Ellis's first novel, Eating the Cheshire Cat (Scribner: 2001), is a dark comedy written in Southern Gothic fiction style. It tells the story of three girls raised in the South, and the odd, sometimes macabre tribulations they endure.

The Turning: What Curiosity Kills (Powell's Books: 2010), her second novel, is a "teen vampire" story about a southern 16-year-old girl adopted into a wealthy New York City family and centers on shape-shifting, teen romance, and the supernatural. The book, according to Vogue, "tanked."

Her third publication, American Housewife (Doubleday: 2016), is "a sharp, funny, delightfully unhinged collection of stories set in the dark world of domesticity". NPR described American Housewife as "a hilariously twisted take on domesticity that grew out of her Tweets @WhatIDoAllDay. Several stories were narrated by frustrated, blocked writers demoralized by repeated rejections." In an interview with Vogue, Ellis explained that for many years she considered herself "a failed writer. And like so many of her characters, Ellis calls herself a housewife. 'I think housewives are powerful and slightly deranged. But so am I...'Housewife' is not a dirty word.'” After a period of not publishing, Ellis explained this was the book in which she “found my voice again.”

Ellis returned to themes of Southern manners and domesticity in a collection of essays entitled Southern Lady Code, published in April 2019. Entertainment Weekly called it "an inspiring, hilarious, straight-to-the-point essay collection" in which Ellis "discusses everything from menopause to seeing a psychic." Her follow-up, Kiss Me in the Coral Lounge, recounts her happy marriage.

Ellis is also a professional poker player who competes in high-stakes tournaments.
