= Craig & Karl =

Australian artist duo

Craig & Karl is an Australian art and design duo composed of Craig Redman and Karl Maier. The duo is based in New York and London and works across illustration, graphic design and installation.

== Background ==
Craig and Karl met in 1996 while studying at the Queensland College of Art and Design, Griffith University, in Brisbane. They began collaborating during their studies and later co-founded the design collective Rinzen. In 2011 they established the independent practice Craig & Karl. The duo work remotely between New York and London.

== Work ==
The duo have worked with clients including Apple, Google, Nike, Samsung, Pokémon, Vogue, The New York Times and New York Magazine. They designed the cover of the 19 November 2012 issue of New York Magazine, which featured a portrait of Barack Obama.

In 2018, the duo contributed to the Universal Love campaign for MGM Resorts, which received a Gold Lion at the Cannes Lions. In 2025 they created a major public installation for the Brisbane Festival.

== Selected exhibitions ==
- 2025: "Double Vision", Griffith University Art Museum, Brisbane, Australia
- 2024: "Inside Out", Times Art Museum, Beijing, China
- 2019: "BAD", Museum of Brisbane, Brisbane, Australia
- 2018: "Shanghai Art & Design Exhibition", Liu Haisu Art Museum, Shanghai, China (Group exhibition)
