= Edna Eicke =

American illustrator

- Edna Eicke, photographed by Tom Funk
- Born: 1919; Montclair, New Jersey
- Died: 1979 (aged 59–60)
- Known for: Illustration
- Spouse: Tom Funk

Edna Eicke (1919–1979) was an American illustrator best known for her distinctive covers for the New Yorker magazine.

== Career ==
Eicke created 51 New Yorker magazine covers from 1946-1961. Much of her work focused on scenes of childhood.

In the foreword to an anthology of the magazine's covers, John Updike singled out Eicke as one of the artists who made some of the most appealing covers, "Do you have trouble letting go of old copies of The New Yorker? Blame the covers … We want to be where the cover is, whether it's a pricey night club by Peter Arno or an Eden-green lawn by Edna Eicke … "

She also did cover and inside illustrations for House & Garden, Vogue, Mademoiselle, Woman's Day, as well as numerous children's books.

== Personal life ==
She was married to the illustrator Tom Funk.
