= P. S. Mueller =

American cartoonist and voice actor

Pete S. Mueller is an American cartoonist and voice actor. His cartoons have appeared in the New Yorker, Chicago Reader, Reader's Digest, and Funny Times, among other publications.

Mueller is noted for his work with the news satire organization, The Onion, which he began his association with around 1989. In 1999, he began writing material and providing the voice for The Onion Radio News' fictional newsreader, Doyle Redland. Mueller also provided narration for the audiobook version of The Onion book, Our Dumb Century (ISBN 978-0-694-52199-9). The photograph of Doyle Redland featured in The Onion publications is not of Mueller.

Mueller was laid off from The Onion in 2010. According to Mueller, while The Onion Radio News has remained popular, "The Onion, Inc. was unable to sell ads to maintain it through [spring 2009], and at the end of 2009, Mr. Redland was folded up and saved for later."

In 2004, Mueller published a collection of his cartoons, Your Belief System Is Shot: Cartoons and Stuff (ISBN 978-0-9721217-7-4). He lives in the Madison, Wisconsin area.
