= Charles Earle Funk =

American lexicographer

Charles Earle Funk (1881–1957) was an American lexicographer.

He was a member of the Funk family who owned the publisher Funk & Wagnalls; spelling reformer and lexicographer Isaac K. Funk was his uncle.

Funk wrote several etymological dictionaries, including Thereby Hangs a Tale: Stories of Curious Word Origins, A Hog On Ice & Other Curious Expressions, Heavens To Betsy & Other Curious Expressions, Horsefeathers and Other Curious Words, and 2107 Curious Word Origins, Sayings & Expressions: From White Elephants to Song & Dance.
