= Anjali Chandrashekar =

Indian-American artist (born c.1993)

Anjali Chandrashekar (born c. 1993) has been an artist since age 16. She works and raises funds for natural calamities, child abuse, and rehabilitation for underprivileged children through her artistic creations.

== Work ==
In 2008, at an International Diabetes Charity, she raised around $5000 for providing insulin to poverty stricken diabetic children.

Chandrashekar won the third prize at the United Nations Poster for Peace Contest. She received the award at the U.N. Headquarters in New York on 3 May 2016. She said, "nuclear disarmament is usually spoken about on such a high level and I believe that art has the power to humanize some of the most pressing issues that the world faces today."

The artist was only 10 years old when she founded Picture It, a non-governmental organisation that uses imagery to raise awareness and funds for various health, humanitarian and environmental causes.

She primarily uses her work to benefit underprivileged children. She uses her art to raise funds for causes like diabetes, dialysis, rehabilitation, child abuse, and cerebral palsy.

Chandrashekar is a British Council Global Changemaker, and represented the Global Changemaker programme at the Economic Forum in 2011. She was the youngest representative, and one of five selected from a pool of over 1500 applicants.

In 2022, Chandrashekar was named to the Forbes 30 Under 30 as one of the first South Asian cartoonists to be published in The New Yorker.

== Personal life ==
Chandrashekar is from Chennai, but she lives in New York City.
