= Mitra Farmand =

American cartoonist

- Area: Cartoonist

Mitra Farmand is an American cartoonist whose work has appeared in The New Yorker, The Nib, and Funny Times. She is from Brookline, Massachusetts.

== Education ==
Farmand has a degree in history from University of Colorado Boulder. In 2013, Farmand graduated from Center for Cartoon Studies in White River Junction, Vermont, a two-year institution.

== Career ==
Farmand was about 40 years old and "working at a bank on financial data" when she went back to school to study comics at the Center for Cartoon Studies.

On June 22, 2015, Farmand's cartoon career began when she published her first cartoon of wolves in sheep's clothing in The New Yorker.
