= Bob Eckstein =

American cartoonist, writer, and illustrator

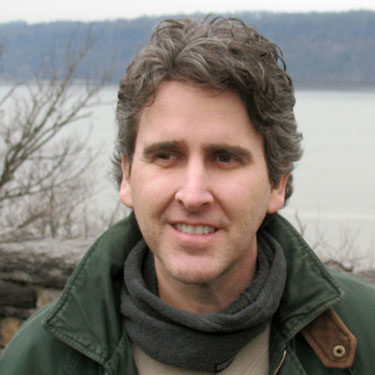
- Eckstein in 2007
- Born: Robert Eckstein; The Bronx, New York City, U.S.
- Occupations: Cartoonist, writer, illustrator, humorist
- Notable work: Footnotes from the World's Greatest Bookstores; The History of the Snowman
- Website: Bob Eckstein

Bob Eckstein is an American cartoonist, writer, illustrator, and humorist. He is best known for his work in The New Yorker and his books Footnotes from the World's Greatest Bookstores and The History of the Snowman. His work has been featured in various publications, and he has been a vocal advocate for independent bookstores. His 2024 book, Footnotes from the World's Most Fascinating Museums, is an illustrated exploration of 75 museums across North America, inspired by the challenges museums faced during the COVID-19 pandemic.

== Early life and education ==
Eckstein was born in the Bronx, New York City, and grew up on Long Island. His father was a bus driver. Eckstein showed an early interest in art and humor, which led him to skip his senior year of high school to attend art college.

== Career ==
Eckstein began his career as a freelance illustrator and writer, contributing to publications such as New York Newsday, The Village Voice, and TimeOut New York. His breakthrough came in 2007 with the publication of The History of the Snowman by Simon & Schuster. This book established him as the world's leading expert on snowmen and led to numerous television and radio appearances.

In 2016, Eckstein published Footnotes from the World's Greatest Bookstores (Penguin Random House), which became a New York Times bestseller. The book features illustrations and anecdotes from some of the world's most iconic bookstores. This work was followed by a series of successful books, including The Ultimate Cartoon Book of Book Cartoons and The Complete Book of Cat Names (That Your Cat Won't Answer to, Anyways).

Eckstein's cartoons have appeared in The New Yorker, The New York Times, MAD magazine, Reader's Digest, and many other publications. He has been nominated twice for Gag Cartoonist of the Year by the National Cartoonists Society.

Besides his work as a cartoonist and writer, Eckstein has taught writing and cartooning at institutions such as New York University, Pratt Institute, and the School of Visual Arts.

His 2024 book, Footnotes from the World's Most Fascinating Museums, offers an illustrated journey through 75 museums across the United States, Canada, Inspired by the struggles museums faced during the COVID-19 pandemic, Eckstein's work aims to raise awareness of these institutions while providing an entertaining and educational experience for readers. He has taught at NYU, Pratt Institute, and the School of Visual Arts.

== Exhibitions and public speaking ==
Eckstein's work has been exhibited in several prestigious venues, including the Cartoon Art Museum of San Francisco, the Smithsonian Institution, and the Cartoon Museum of London. He has also spoken at over 200 TV and radio shows, including Good Morning America, and at events such as the Miami Book Fair and the Norman Rockwell Museum. He is a frequent speaker at conferences and festivals, including the annual Writer's Digest Humor Conference and the Milford Readers & Writers Festival.

== Advocacy and public engagement ==
Eckstein has been a vocal advocate for independent bookstores, speaking publicly against online shopping. He has used his platform to raise awareness of the importance of supporting local bookstores.

== Personal life ==
Eckstein resides in New York City with his wife who he had met in art college. He has a particular interest in museums, which led to the creation of his latest book, Footnotes from the Most Fascinating Museums (Chronicle Books, 2024). This work features stories and illustrations from over 75 museums across North America.

== Bibliography ==
- The History of the Snowman (2007)
- Footnotes from the World's Greatest Bookstores (2016)
- The Illustrated History of the Snowman (2018)
- The Ultimate Cartoon Book of Book Cartoons (2019)
- Everyone’s A Critic: The Ultimate Cartoon Book by the World’s Greatest Cartoonists (2020)
- All's Fair In Love & War (2021)
- The Complete Book of Cat Names (That Your Cat Won't Answer to, Anyways) (2022)
- Footnotes from the Most Fascinating Museums (2024)
