= Frank Sullivan (writer) =

American columnist and humorist (1892–1976)

- Born: September 22, 1892; Saratoga Springs, New York, U.S.
- Died: February 19, 1976 (aged 83); Saratoga Springs, New York, U.S.
- Education: Cornell University
- Occupation: Humorist
- Writing career
- Notable work: Mr. Arbuthnot

Francis John Sullivan (September 22, 1892 – February 19, 1976) was an American humorist, best remembered for creating the character Mr. Arbuthnot the Cliche Expert.

== Life ==
Sullivan was born in Saratoga Springs, New York, to Dennis and Catherine (Shea) Sullivan. and graduated from Cornell University in 1914. He worked for The Saratogian newspaper until he was drafted in 1917. Upon his discharge, Sullivan moved to New York City and worked for several papers as a reporter and feature writer.

Sullivan wrote his first article for The New Yorker in 1925, the year it was founded. His most celebrated character, Mr. Arbuthnot, made his debut in the issue of August 31, 1935 in "The Cliche Expert Takes the Stand". In one story Mr. Arbuthnot was asked what he did for exercise, and he replied, "I keep the wolf from the door, let the cat out of the bag, take the bull by the horns, count my chickens before they are hatched, and see that the horse isn't put behind the cart or stolen before I lock the barn door".

The last Mr. Arbuthnot story, "The Cliche Expert Testifies On the Campaign", appeared in The New Yorker on September 13, 1952.

According to The Encyclopedia of American Humorists, the play Arsenic and Old Lace was given its title when the producers adapted the title of a collection of humor pieces by Sullivan called Broccoli and Old Lace.

Sullivan never married. He returned to Saratoga Springs in the 1960s and lived there until his death in 1976.

Sullivan was a peripheral member of the famous Algonquin Round Table.

"Frank Sullivan Place", formerly High Street, is named for him in Saratoga Springs, New York. It forms the border of the Saratoga Racecourse property near the track clubhouse.

He is credited with the line, "This is either a forgery or a damned clever original!". This may be considered an example of what he called "Wolf sentences", described in his A rock in every snowball: sentences which appear grammatical and to make sense until closer examination; many are examples of comparative illusion sentences.

== Bibliography ==
=== Books ===
- Sullivan, Frank (1926). The Life and Times of Martha Hepplethwaite. Boni & Liveright.
- Sullivan, Frank (1928). Innocent Bystanding. Liveright.
- Sullivan, Frank (1931). Broccoli and Old Lace. Liveright.
- Sullivan, Frank (1933). In One Ear. . . Viking.
- Sullivan, Frank (1938). A Pearl in Every Oyster. Little, Brown.
- Sullivan, Frank (1946). A Rock in Every Snowball. Little, Brown.
- Sullivan, Frank (1953). The Night the Old Nostalgia Burned Down. Little, Brown.
- Sullivan, Frank (1954). Sullivan Bites News: Perverse News Items. Little, Brown.
- Sullivan, Frank (1959). A Moose in the Hoose. Random House. (also titled A Moose in the House)
- Cannon, Jimmy (1943). The Sergeant Says. Edited by Frank Sullivan. Knopf.
- Connelly, Mark, ed. (1970). Frank Sullivan Through the Looking Glass: a Collection of His Letters and Pieces. Doubleday.
- Sullivan, Frank (1996). Frank Sullivan at His Best. Dover.

=== Reporting and other short pieces ===
- Sullivan, Frank (March 28, 1925). "Ten, twenty, thirt". The New Yorker. Vol. 1, no. 6. pp. 11–12.
