= Kim Warp =

American cartoonist

Kim Warp is an American cartoonist of Norwegian descent whose work has appeared in Barron's Magazine, Harvard Business Review, The New Yorker, Reader's Digest, USA Weekend, and elsewhere. She has contributed cartoons to the New Yorker for over 15 years. Kim's cartoons often comment on popular culture or politics in the US, but mostly center around family life like helicopter parenting and old people.

Warp joined the National Cartoonist Society (NCS) in 1999 and in 2000, she received the NCS Gag Cartoon Award. She got interested in magazine cartoons by flipping through Collier's magazine as a child.

Her work is collected in books like Funny Ladies: The New Yorker's Greatest Women Cartoonists and both volumes of the New Yorker Rejection Collections, The Best of the Rejection Collection: 293 Cartoons That Were Too Dumb, Too Dark, or Too Naughty for The New Yorker, and The rejection collection : cartoons you never saw, and never will see, in the New Yorker. 2, The cream of the crap and on her contributor page at the New Yorker.
