= Elena Xausa =

Italian illustrator (1984–2022)

Elena Xausa (11 July 1984 - 27 November 2022) was an Italian illustrator born in Verona, Italy. She created illustrations for numerous publications including The New Yorker, The New York Times, New York, Financial Times, The Washington Post, Die Zeit, Le Monde, Monocle, and Rolling Stone.

Xausa grew up in Marostica, Italy, and spent time in Berlin, Milan and New York before setting back in Marostica, where she died at her home on 27 November 2022 from appendiceal cancer at age 38.

Xausa held her first solo exhibit, "Coming Home," in 2021, a year before her death, at the Civic Museum of Bassano del Grappa.
