= 17th CAT Awards =

17th Cartoon Art Trust Awards
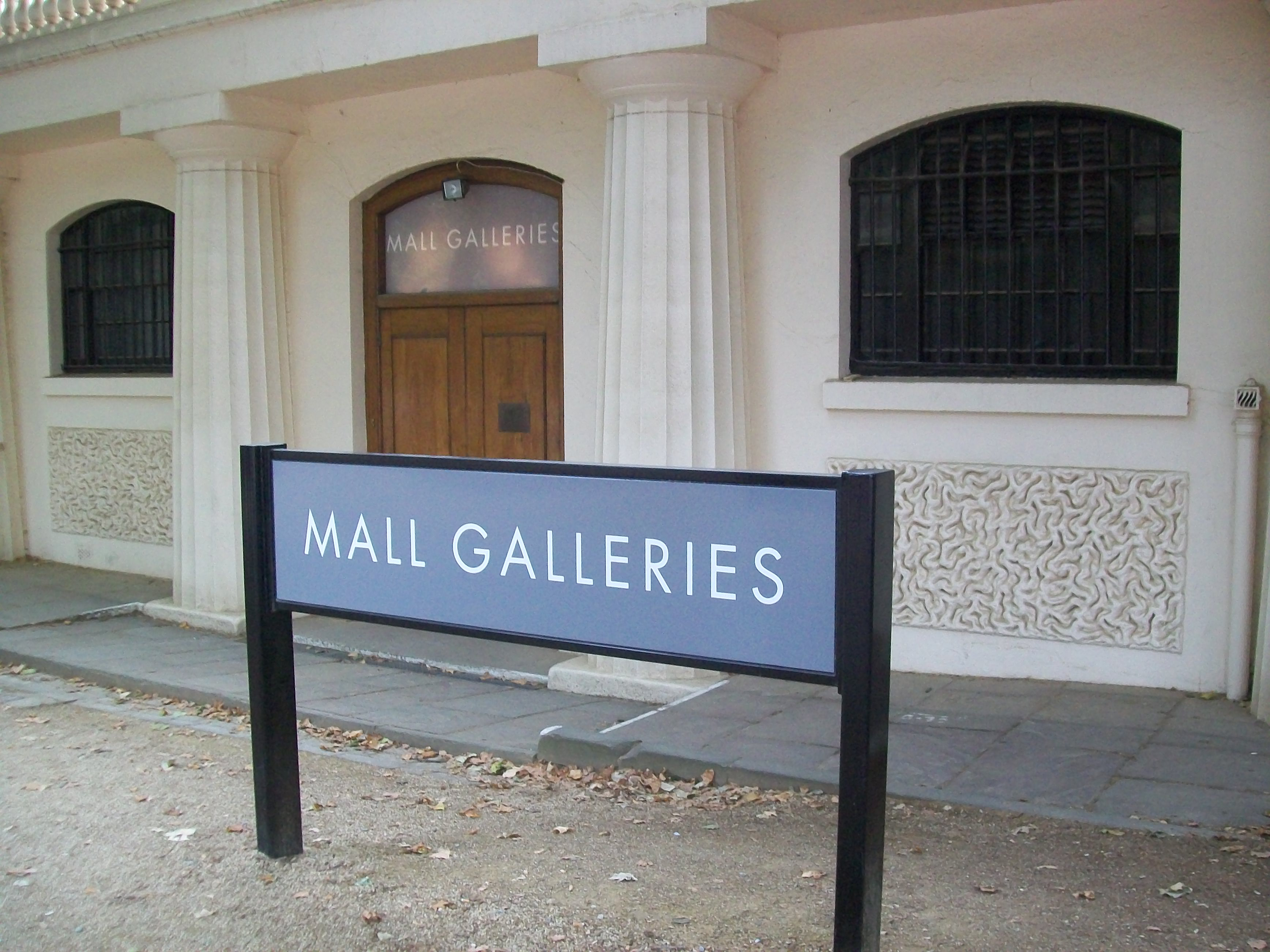
- Date: October 2013
- Site: Mall Galleries, London
- Hosted by: Oliver Preston

The 17th Cartoon Art Trust Awards, hosted by the Cartoon Art Trust, owners and operators of the Cartoon Museum, were held in October 2013 at the Mall Galleries in London, honouring the best cartoons of 2013. The award ceremony was hosted by cartoonist and museum chairman Oliver Preston.

== Winners ==
- British Cartoonists' Association Young Cartoonist of the Year Award - Under 18 Category: Harry McSweeney
- British Cartoonists' Association Young Cartoonist of the Year Award - Under 30 Category: Will McPhail
- CAT Award for Joke Cartooning: Kipper Williams
- CAT Award for Strip Cartooning: Mike Barfield (for the cartoon strip "Apparently" in Private Eye).
- CAT Award for Caricature: Peter Shrank
- CAT Award for Political Cartooning: Peter Brookes
- CAT Award for Pocket Cartooning: Matt (Matthew Pritchett)
- The Heneage Cup: The Cartoon Art Trust Lifetime Achievement Award" Nicholas Garland

== See also ==
- British Cartoonists' Association
- Cartoon Art Trust
- Cartoon Art Trust Awards
- Cartoon Museum
