= Young Cartoonist of the Year Award =

- Young Cartoonist of the Year Award
- Awarded for: The best in cartoons
- Sponsored by: Cartoon Art Trust and British Cartoonists' Association
- Country: United Kingdom
- First award: 1995
- Website: www.cartoonmuseum.org/about/awards

The Young Cartoonists Awards, also known as the Young Cartoonist of the Year Award, is an annual award ceremony hosted by the Cartoon Museum in London in association with the British Cartoonists' Association, awards being given to the best young cartoonists, in the category of Under 18 and Under 30. The judging and awards ceremonies are hosted at the Cartoon Museum. A number of past winners have gone on to enjoy successful careers in cartooning, including Ella Baron and Will McPhail.

== History ==
The Young Cartoonist of the Year Award was originally founded as the Mel Calman Awards in 1995, in memory of The Times cartoonist and Cartoon Art Trust founder. The first awards were presented by Peter Stothard, editor of The Times, the original sponsors of the awards. The original judges included Mark Bryant, Enzo Apicella, Steve Bell, Peter Brookes, and Posy Simmonds. The winner was 17 year old Jonathan Cusick.

The awards ceremony has been held at the Postal Museum, London (1995), Simpson's-in-the-Strand (1996), and at the Mall Galleries during the Cartoon Art Trust Awards. More recently the ceremony has been at The Cartoon Museum in London. Today the awards are run jointly by the Cartoon Art Trust and the British Cartoonists' Association.

== Overview ==
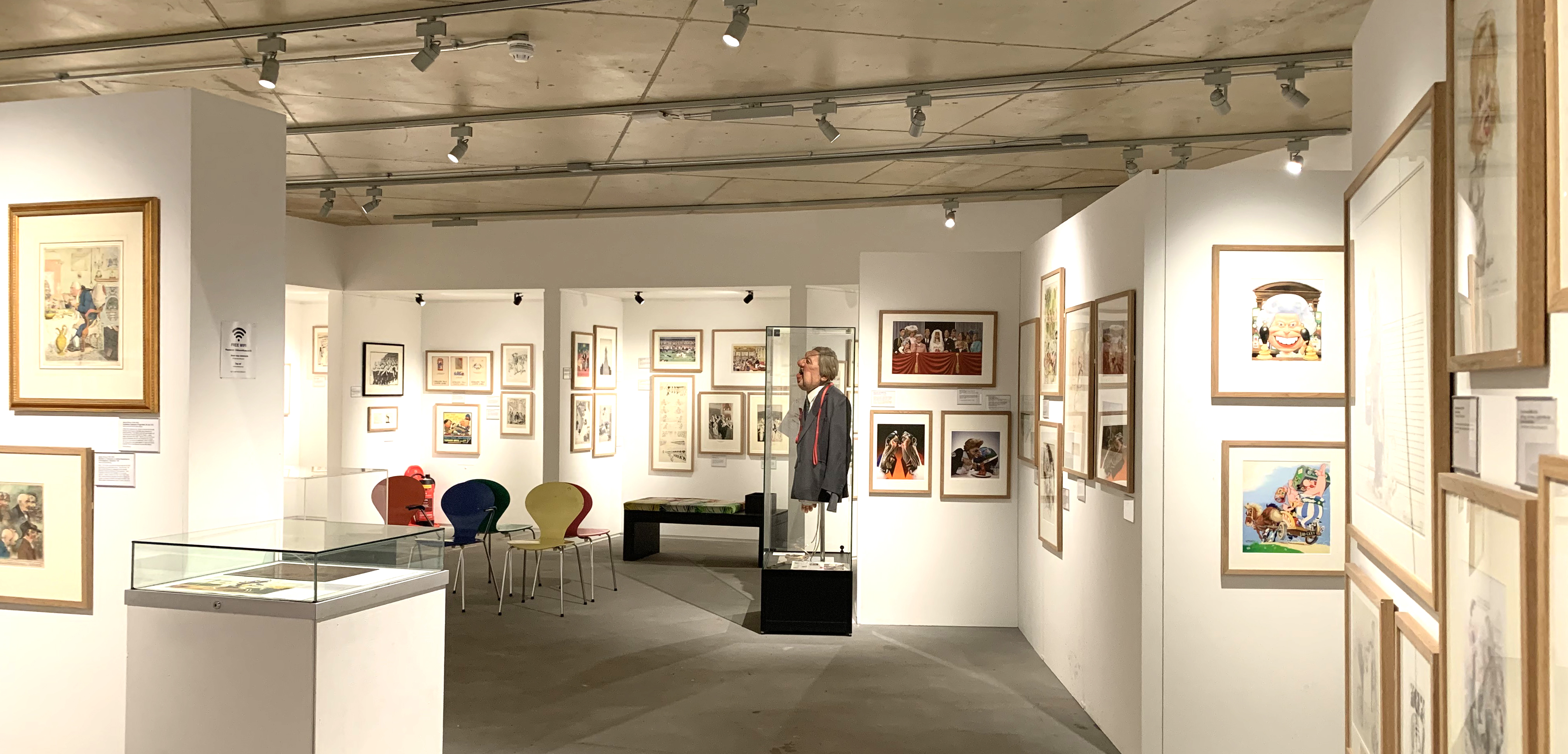
Cartoon Museum

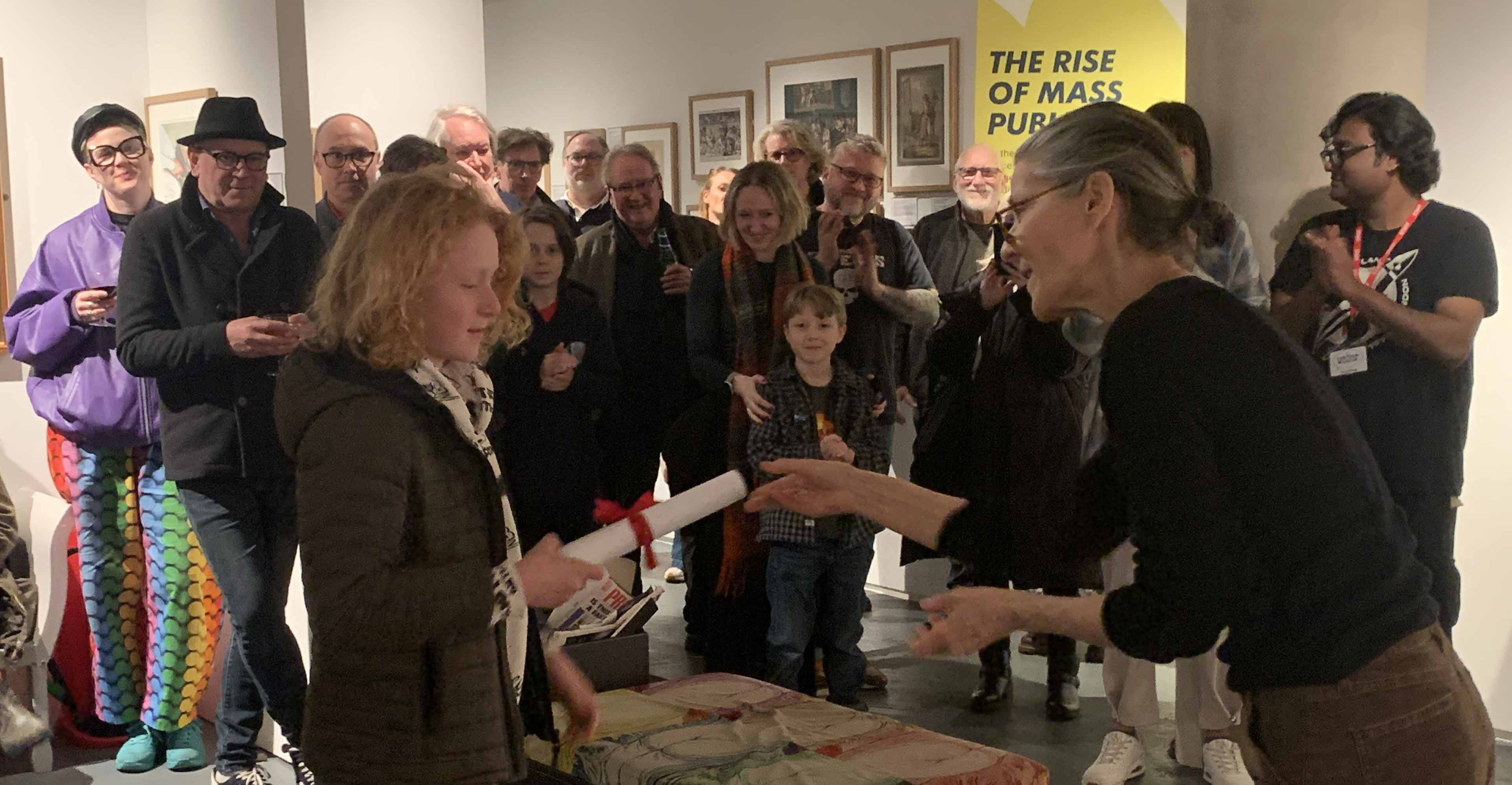
Young Cartoonist Of The Year Awards 26 March 2026

Entrants are requested to submit one cartoon, in colour or black and white, drawn freehand to a maximum size of A4. (In 2013 digitally created work was included.)

The awards are judged by noted cartoonists, including Oliver Preston, Martin Rowson, Steve Bell, Charles Peattie, Dave Brown, Matt Pritchett, Woodrow Phoenix, James Mellor, Pete Songi, Ros Asquith, and Comics Laureate Hannah Berry. The competition receives around 1,000 submissions every year.

Each winner receives a prize of £250 and a certificate. There are three categories: Under 18, Under 30, and the "Woodcock Prize" - awarded in memory of the late surrealist cartoonist Kevin Woodcock. The awards are sponsored by Léonie Wykes-Mahood in memory of her late husband, the cartoonist Kenneth Mahood.

=== Awards ===
Past winners include Ella Baron, The New Yorker cartoonist Will McPhail and Matt Buck.

- 1995: 1st YCOTY Awards Jonathan Cusick (age 17)
- 2007: 12th YCOTY Awards James Hood
- 2009: 14th YCOTY Awards
  - Best Cartoonist Under 18: Alexander Shaw
  - Best Cartoonist Under 30: Nick Edwards
- 2010: 15th YCOTY Awards: Alex Driver
- 2011 16th YCOTY Awards
  - Best Cartoonist Under 30: Joe Mounsey
  - Best Cartoonist Under 18: Jasper Ashton-Nelson, aged 13
- 2012: 17th YCOTY Awards
  - Best Cartoonist Under 30 Will McPhail
  - Best Cartoonist Under 18: Harry McSweeny, aged 14
- 2016 21st YCOTY Awards
  - Best Cartoonist Under 18: Billy Partridge
  - Best Cartoonist Under 30: Alex Dempsey
- 2017: 22nd YCOTY Awards
  - Best Cartoonist Under 30: Ella Baron
- 2018: 23rd YCOTY Awards
  - Best Cartoonist Under 18: Laura Ross-Stuttard (age 16)
  - Best Cartoonist Under 30: Matthew Dixon
  - Woodcock Prize: Hugh Kay (age 11)
- 2020: 25th YCOTY Awards
  - Best Cartoonist Under 18: Daniel Meikle (Runners Up: Erica Potter & Rohan Rooney)
  - Best Cartoonist Under 30: Fergus Boylan (Runners Up: Sid Yates, Ruth Adams)
- 2021: 26th YCOTY Awards
  - Best Cartoonist Under 18: Rohan Rooney (Runners Up: Emily Young (2nd place, U18 category), Reyansh Avihash, Holly Chadwick, Jack Cherry, Liv Gwinner, Hayden Hewathantri & Trix Latimer)
  - Best Cartoonist Under 30: Cara Grainger (Runners Up: Lara Evans (2nd place, U30 category) Jo Sarginson (3rd place, U30 category), Zoom Rockman & Hannah Rohin)
  - Woodcock Prize: Bianca Hsu (age 9)
- 2022: 27th YCOTY Awards
  - Best Cartoonist Under 18: Corb Calow Davies Runner Up Rafe Snowdowne
  - Best Cartoonist Under 30: Harriet Bourhill Runner Up Edward Wills Garcia
  - Woodcock Prize: George Whitehead
- 2023: 28th YCOTY Awards
  - Best Cartoonist Under 18: Issy Laing (Runner Up: Dylan Jewitt)
  - Best Cartoonist Under 30: Rex Yardley Rees (Runner Up: Jess Judge)
  - Woodcock Prize: Oliver Grant
- 2024 - 29th YCOTY Awards
  - Best Cartoonist Under 18: Artie Hicks, age 10 (Runner Up: George Green)
  - Best Cartoonist Under 30: Jess Judge (Runner Up: Ryan Fairbanks)
  - Woodcock Prize: Rafe Carver
- 2025 - 30th YCOTY Awards
  - Best Cartoonist Under 18: Artie Hicks, age 11 (Runner Up - Rafe Carver, age 11)
  - Best Cartoonist Under 30: Tom Morris, age 29. (Runner Up - William Fothergill, age 25)
  - Woodcock Prize: Reggie Shiers (age 7)

== See also ==
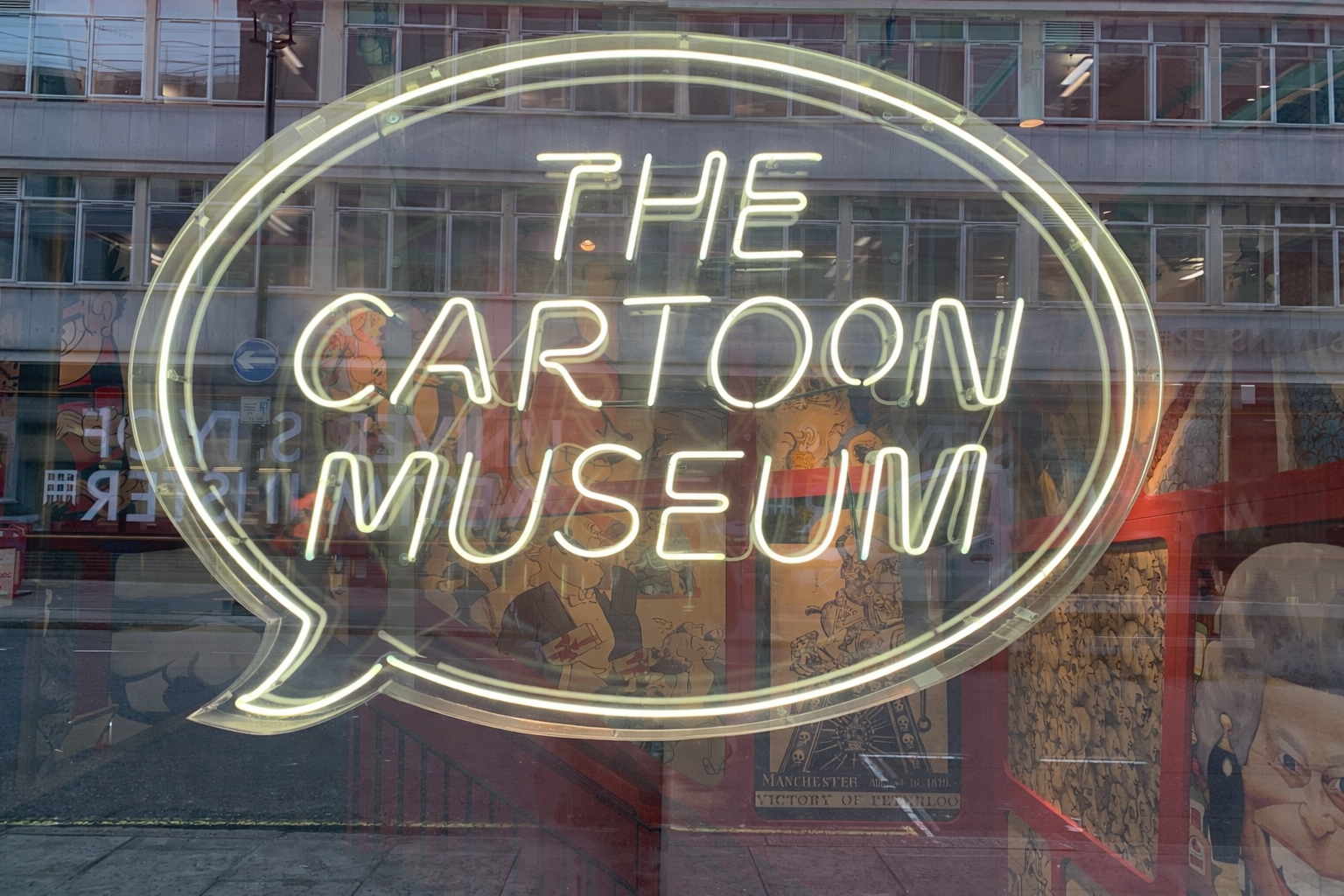
Cartoon Museum, Wells St, Fitzrovia

- British Cartoonists' Association
- Cartoon Museum
- Cartoon Art Trust
- Cartoon Art Trust Awards
