= 21st CAT Awards =

21st Cartoon Art Trust Awards
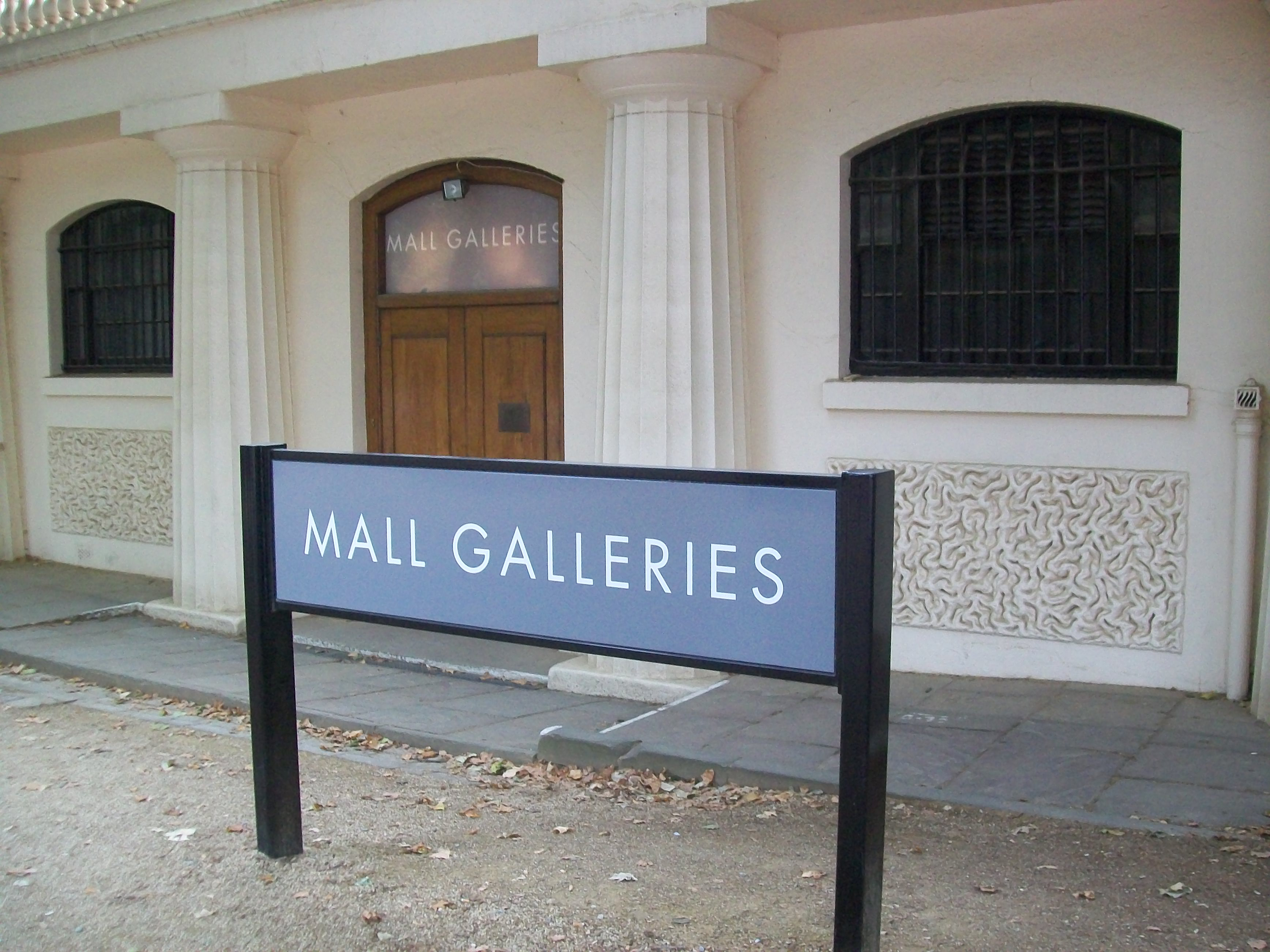
- Date: 12 October 2017
- Site: Mall Galleries, London
- Hosted by: Oliver Preston

The 21st Cartoon Art Trust Awards, hosted by the Cartoon Art Trust, owners and operators of the Cartoon Museum, were held on 12 October 2017 at the Mall Galleries in London, honouring the best cartoons of 2017. The award ceremony was hosted by cartoonist and museum chairman Oliver Preston.

== Winners ==
- British Cartoonists' Association Young Cartoonist of the Year Award – Under 18 Category: Billy Barron
- British Cartoonists' Association Young Cartoonist of the Year Award – Under 30 Category: Ella Baron
- CAT Award for Joke Cartooning: Adam Singleton
- CAT Award for Strip Cartooning: Alexander Williams
- CAT Award for Caricature: Ben Jennings
- CAT Award for Political Cartooning: Bob Moran
- The Pont Cup for drawing The British Character: Sally Artz
- The Heneage Cup: The Cartoon Art Trust Lifetime Achievement Award" Peter Brookes

== See also ==
- Cartoon Art Trust Awards
- Cartoon Museum
