= John Jensen (cartoonist) =

- Born: John Gibson; 8 August 1930; Sydney, Australia
- Died: 2018 (aged 87–88)
- Known for: Satirical cartoons; regular contributor to many newspapers and periodicals

John Jensen (8 August 1930 – 2018) was an Australian-British cartoonist and caricature artist. Born in Sydney, Australia in 1930, he travelled to England in his early twenties, where he remained for the remainder of his career. He died in London in 2018.

== Biography ==
John Jensen was born John Gibson in Sydney, Australia, on 8 August 1930, the son of the cartoonist Jack Gibson. Later he would adopt the surname of his stepfather. From 1946 to 1947 Jensen studied at the Julian Ashton Art School, Sydney.

Jensen’s first cartoon was published in the Sydney Sun in 1946. He began his career as a cartoonist freelancing for a variety of publications such as Australia: National Journal and Pertinent. In 1950 Jensen travelled to England on the SS Fred Christiansen.

During the course of a long career in England Jensen contributed to many British newspaper publications including the London Evening News, The Sunday Telegraph, Punch, Tatler and The Spectator.

Jensen was one of the founder members of the British Cartoonists' Association in 1966 and served as its Chairman from 1995 to 2000. He was a director of the Cartoon Art Trust, owner of the Cartoon Museum, from 1988 and Chairman from 1992 to 1993.

== See also ==
- Cartoon Art Trust
- Cartoon Museum
- Young Cartoonist of the Year Award
