= Kenneth Mahood =

Northern Irish cartoonist (1930–2021)

- Born: 4 February 1930; Belfast, Northern Ireland
- Died: 30 January 2021 (aged 90)
- Known for: Satirical cartoons; regular contributor to many newspapers and periodicals

Kenneth Mahood (4 February 1930 – 30 January 2021) was a Northern Irish cartoonist and illustrator. Over the course of a long career he contributed cartoons to many publications including The Times, the Daily Mail, Punch and the New Yorker.

== Biography ==
Mahood was born in Belfast, Northern ireland on 4 February 1930. He would later claim to have been raised “in a religious community so strict even the churches were closed on Sundays.”

In 1966 Mahood joined The Times newspaper, becoming their first-ever political cartoonist. Mahood’s work first appeared in the newspaper on 3 May 1966; he became a regular contributor thereafter. Also in 1966 Mahood became a founder member of the British Cartoonists' Association.

Mahood said of his work, “at a time when the news is very grim, I think people look for some light relief. And that’s the job of the cartoonist. The important thing is to be witty and to make a comment at the same time, if possible.” Over the course of a long career Ken Mahood drew over 14,000 cartoons. Mahood retired from the Daily Mail in December 2009, shortly before his eightieth birthday.

== Death and Legacy ==
Mahood died in London on 30 January 2021, aged 90. The annual Young Cartoonist of the Year Awards, which support and encourage emerging talent in the field of cartooning, are sponsored by Ken Mahood's widow Léonie Wykes-Mahood in memory of her late husband.

== See also ==
- Cartoon Art Trust
- Cartoon Museum
- Young Cartoonist of the Year Award
