= The Cartoonists' Club of Great Britain =

- Formation: 1960; 66 years ago
- Type: Cartoonists organization
- Purpose: Professional support and networking
- Location: London
- Region served: United Kingdom
- Members: 200
- Chairman: Rich Skipworth
- Website: www.ccgb.org.uk

The Cartoonists' Club of Great Britain (CCGB) is an organisation open to all United Kingdom cartoonists. Established in 1960 by a group of Fleet Street cartoonists, including Ian James Scott and Sally Artz, the club claims to be one of the largest cartoonists' organisations in the world, with a membership of over 200 full- and part-time cartoonists both in the United Kingdom and abroad.

The club represents and supports cartoonists who create single gags to strips and caricature to cartoon illustrations, the CCGB provides a professional network for the up-and-coming new generation.

Many of the great names from the British cartoon fraternity have been members of the CCGB since its founding. The club has been responsible for organising many local, nationwide and international cartoon events, from exhibitions and competitions to charitable fundraising events or demonstrating the art of the Cartoon to young people at road shows and public exhibitions.

The CCGB works with many local towns and communities helping to promote the cause/art of Cartooning in Britain.

== See also ==
- British Cartoonists' Association
- Cartoon Art Trust
- Cartoon Museum
- Society of Strip Illustration
