= Bob (comics) =

Bob, in comics, may refer to:

- Bob Moran, an award-winning British cartoonist
- Bob, Agent of Hydra, a Marvel Comics character associated with Deadpool
- Bob (First Comics), a "watchlizard" from the First Comics series GrimJack
- Bob the Monitor, a character who appeared in Countdown to Final Crisis

== See also ==
- Bob (disambiguation)
