= Will McPhail =

Cartoonist and illustrator based in Scotland

Will McPhail is a cartoonist and illustrator based in Scotland. He has illustrated for the magazines The New Yorker and Private Eye, as well as The New Statesman.

== Early life and career ==
McPhail was born in 1988 in Lancashire, England, to mother Jane McPhail. He grew up in Chorley in Lancashire. He studied zoology at, and graduated from, the University of Glasgow.

His work was published in Private Eye for the first time while he was still attending university. In 2013, he won the Young Cartoonist of the Year Award, given by the London Cartoon Museum. In 2014, his work began to be published in The New Yorker.

In 2021, McPhail's debut graphic novel, In, was published by Houghton Mifflin Harcourt. The fictional story focuses on a professional illustrator named Nick Moss. In 2022, the book won the Betty Trask Prize from the Society of Authors, making it the first graphic novel to win the award. In the same year, In won the Saltire Society First Book of the Year Award.

In 2022, a book of McPhail's cartoons was published, titled Love & Vermin.
