= Nicola Jennings =

British cartoonist

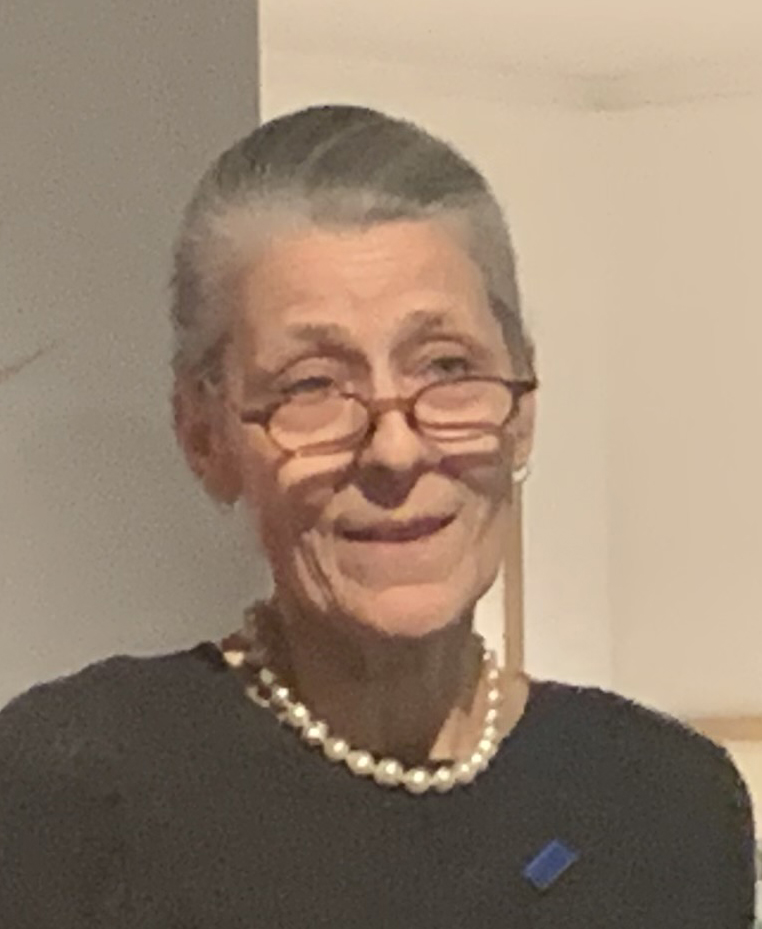
- Nicola Jennings at the Cartoon Museum in March 2026
- Born: 10 September 1958 (age 67); London
- Education: St Mary's School Ascot, Taunton Art School
- Alma mater: Wimbledon School of Art
- Occupation: cartoonist
- Employer: The Guardian
- Known for: Political Satire
- Website: www.nicolajennings.co.uk

Nicola Jennings is a British cartoonist, best known for political satire in the pages of The Guardian. Jennings is Chair of the British Cartoonists' Association and also Chair of the Cartoon Museum in London.

== Biography ==
=== Early life ===
Nicola Jennings was born in London on 10 September 1958, and grew up at the family home of Babington House, in Somerset. She was educated at St Mary's School Ascot, Taunton Art School from 1976 to 1977 and, from 1977 to 1980, she studied theatre design at Wimbledon School of Art.

=== Career ===
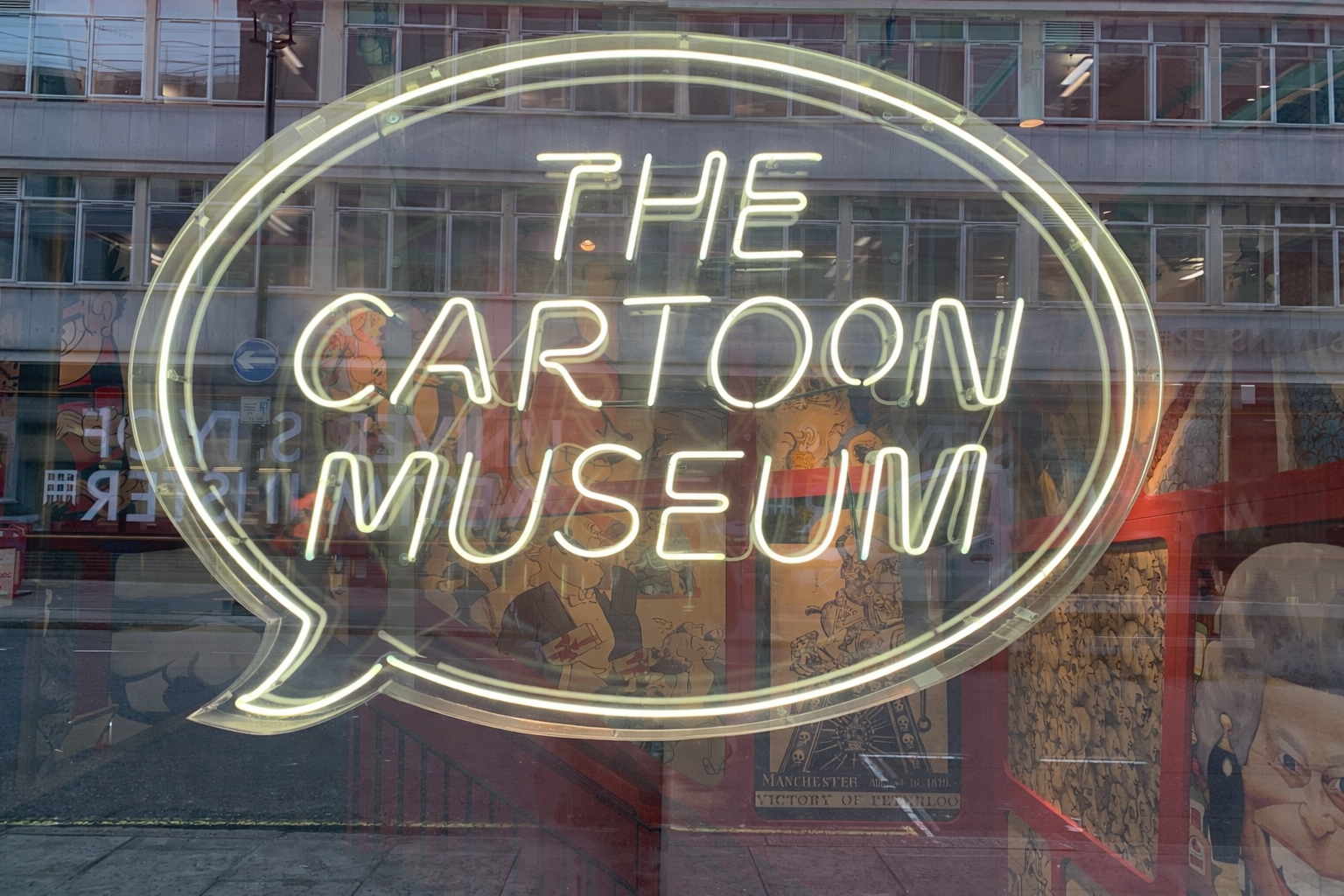
Cartoon Museum, Wells St

Jennings began her career designing opera. Her work as a caricaturist began in 1987 when she contributed work to the London Daily News. Later she worked for the Daily Mirror and the Observer. Today her work can be seen regularly in the pages of The Guardian.

Jennings is Chair of the British Cartoonists' Association and also Chair of the Cartoon Museum in London.
