= Bob Moran =

British cartoonist

Bob Moran is a British cartoonist whose work has been published in many publications, including Morning Star, The Guardian and The Telegraph and more recently The Conservative Woman. On 12 October 2017, he was awarded the Cartoon Art Trust Award for Political Cartooning. He was sacked by The Telegraph in October 2021 following tweets in which he commented that Rachel Clarke "should be verbally abused" for encouraging the use of masks on public transport.

== Career ==
Moran attended Wellington School, Somerset and graduated from Falmouth University in 2008. In 2010, he had a short period working for The Guardian before becoming the regular weekend cartoonist for The Daily Telegraph in 2011.

In 2015, Moran's animated short film, 'Father's Days', about the birth of his daughter, was published on The Daily Telegraph's website. The film has been screened in neonatal clinics, charities and parenting associations internationally.

Moran has tweeted frequently about the COVID-19 pandemic, describing those who have been vaccinated as "dangerously misguided". On 13 October 2021, Press Gazette reported Moran had been sacked by The Telegraph for tweets aimed at palliative care physician Rachel Clarke on Twitter in late September. One of his tweets said Clarke deserved to be "verbally abused" for advocating the wearing of face masks. It was removed by Twitter for breaking its guidelines.

Bob Moran's cartoons have been criticised by the Media Diversity Institute for being "antisemitic".

== Awards ==
- Runner Up Political Cartoon of the Year award from the Political Cartoon Society (2015)
- Shortlisted for a World Illustration Award by the AOI (2015)
- Honoree, Online Film & Video, The Webby Awards (2016)
- Cartoon Art Trust Award for Political Cartooning, 12 October 2017
- COVID Cartoon of the Year award from the Political Cartoon of the Year Awards (2020)
