= Ella Baron =

British cartoonist

Ella Baron is a British cartoonist whose work appears in The Times and The Guardian.

Baron was educated at Merton College, Oxford University, where she had work published in the student newspaper Cherwell. Baron is a political cartoonist for newspapers including The Times and The Guardian. In 2017 Baron won the Young Cartoonist of the Year Award in the under 30 category. In May 2025 Baron went to Ukraine to create a visual record of and reflection on the impact of war.
