= Sally Artz =

British cartoonist and illustrator

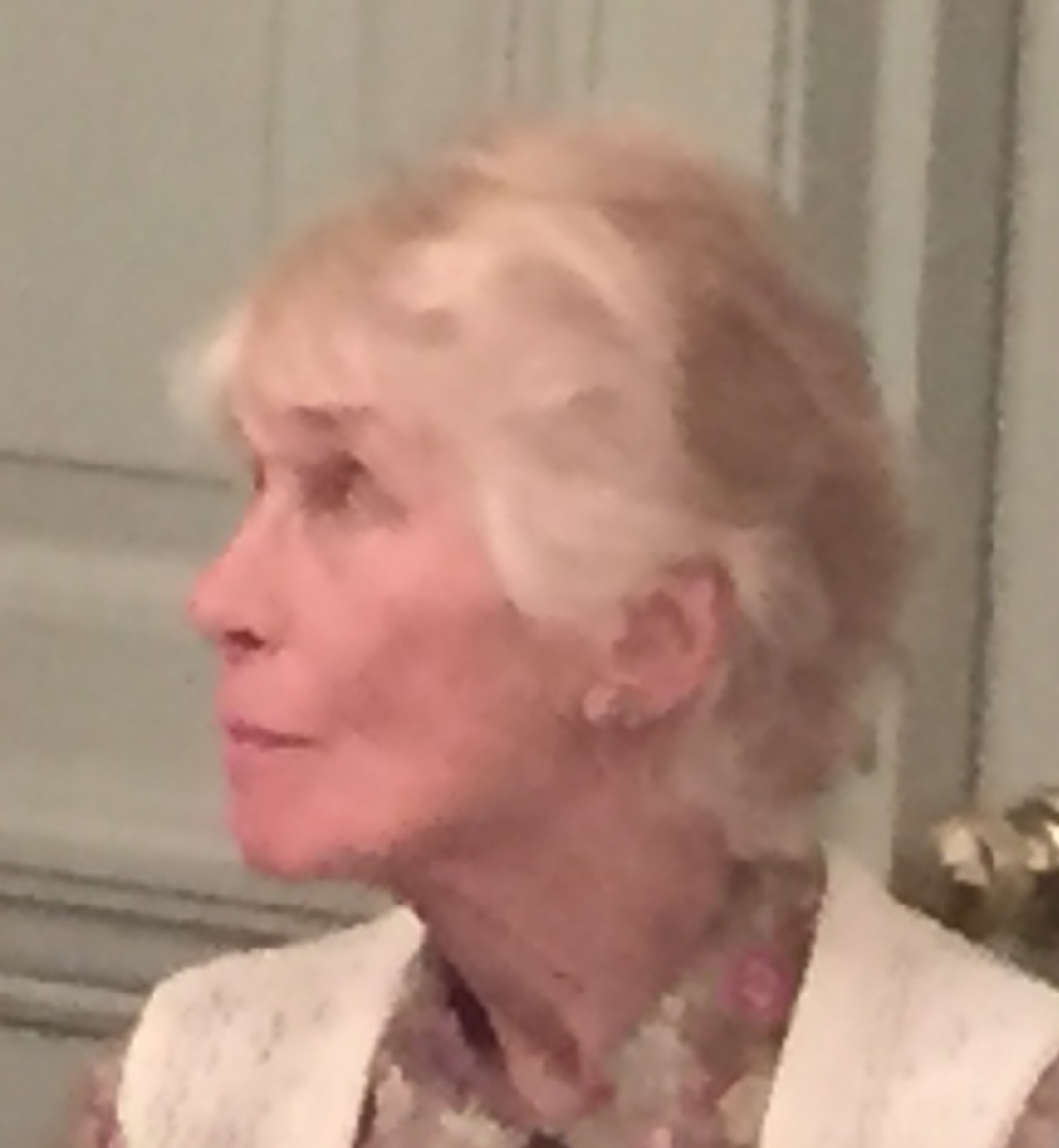
- Sally Artz at a BCA event in May 2018
- Born: 1935 (age 90–91); London, England
- Known for: Satirical cartoons
- Website: https://procartoonists.org/portfolios/sallyartz/

Sally Artz is a British cartoonist and illustrator, whose work has been featured in many publications including Punch, Private Eye, Reader’s Digest, The Spectator, the Mail on Sunday, The Oldie and the Daily Mirror. She is a founder member of the Cartoonists' Club of Great Britain. In addition, she is the former vice-president of the British Cartoonists' Association.

Artz studied at the Saint Martin's School of Art and began work as a professional cartoonist in 1956.

In 2017 she was awarded The Pont Cup for drawing The British Character at the 21st Cartoon Art Trust Awards.
