= Peter Brookes =

English cartoonist

- Born: Peter D. Brookes; 28 September 1943 (age 83) Liverpool, England
- Areas: Political cartoonist, artist

Peter D. Brookes, CBE, RDI (born 28 September 1943) is an English cartoonist who has produced work for numerous publications, including Radio Times, New Society, New Statesman, The Spectator, and, most notably, The Times, for which he has been the leader-page cartoonist since 1992. He has won the title of Cartoonist of the Year at the British Press Awards in 2012, 2011, 2010, 2007, and 2002. On 12 October 2017 he was given the Lifetime Achievement Award at the 21st Cartoon Art Trust Awards.

== Early life ==
Peter Brookes was born in Liverpool, on 28 September 1943, the son of an RAF Squadron Leader and he attended Heversham Grammar School, Westmorland. After school, he initially joined the RAF to train as a pilot and studied for a University of London BA degree at the Royal Air Force College Cranwell, but left to go to art college in Manchester. He then attended the Central School of Art and Design in London.

== Career ==
In the mid-1970s, he replaced Chris Achilleos as regular jacket illustrator for Doctor Who novelisations from Target Books but his cartoon-style artwork proved less popular than Achilleos's more naturalistic style and he completed only four covers. In the 1970s, he was also a cartoonist for the Radio Times, taking over the main back-page cartoon from Mark Boxer in 1979. He had a short stint as a political cartoonist for the New Statesman, before returning to academia and lecturing at the Central School of Art and the Royal College of Art. For a time, he worked as cover artist for The Spectator but, in 1992, he moved to The Times, as its leader-page cartoonist, at the invitation of its newly appointed editor, Peter Stothard.

He is particularly noted for his "Nature Notes" series of cartoons, begun in February 1996, which portray various fictitious beasts, based on the appearance (and supposed habits) of well-known politicians. He has noted that a benefit of using animal images is that he can show his subjects doing things that, for reasons of decency, could not be published if they were portrayed as human—Brookes said: "you are able to depict crap and fornication and that sort of thing".

In 2009, he drew a controversial portrayal of Pope Benedict XVI with a condom on his head, which elicited a rebuke from Cardinal Cormac Murphy O'Connor. He was also the subject of an exhibition at the Chris Beetles Gallery in London in October of that year.

With the formation of the coalition government in 2010, he began a notable series of cartoons known as the "Westminster Academy", which depicted Nick Clegg as a public school fag to a red cheeked David Cameron, who was portrayed as a prefect dressed in an Eton suit and Union Jack waistcoat, with Boris Johnson and George Osborne also appearing in some cartoons as his cronies. During this period, he depicted leader of the opposition Ed Miliband and shadow chancellor Ed Balls as Wallace and Gromit.

== Technique ==
Brookes uses T. H. Saunders paper, on which he draws with Pelikan black ink and a dip pen, equipped with Gillott nibs, as well as watercolour and gouache. He says, "There are three stages to the way I draw cartoons: first they are rendered loosely in soft pencil, then I overlay that with pen and Indian ink, and finally I add tone and colour with watercolour."

== Publications ==
- Peter Brookes: The Best Cartoons of Peter Brookes [Hardcover] Little, Brown ISBN 0-316-72439-4
- Peter Brookes: The Best of Times...: A Cartoon Collection [Hardcover] Little, Brown ISBN 1-906779-58-9
- Peter Brookes: Nature Notes IV: The Natural Selection Little, Brown; 2004. ISBN 0-316-72722-9
- Peter Brookes: Critical Times Biteback; 2019. ISBN 9781785905209
- Peter Brookes: Desperate Times Biteback; 2021. ISBN 9781785906886
- Peter Brookes: Torrid Times Biteback; 2023. ISBN 9781785908248

== Awards ==
- British Press Awards: "Cartoonist of the Year" (2002, 2007, 2010, 2011)
- Political Cartoon Society: "Cartoonist of the Year" (2006, 2009)
- Cartoon Art Trust Award: "Political Cartoonist of the Year" (1996, 1998, 2006, 2008)
- What the Papers Say Award: "Cartoonist of the Year" (2005)

Brookes was appointed Commander of the Order of the British Empire (CBE) in the 2017 New Year Honours for services to the media.
