= Pete Songi =

British cartoonist

Peter "Pete" Songi is a British cartoonist whose work appears in a number of UK publications including The Daily Mirror, The Morning Star, Private Eye and The Guardian. Songi is the editor of The New Cartoonist, a digital bi-monthly magazine featuring interviews, reviews, and cartoon submissions. Songi is also a judge at the Young Cartoonist of the Year Awards.
