= If... (comic) =

British political satire comic (1981–2021) by Steve Bell

If... is a political comic strip which appeared in the United Kingdom newspaper, The Guardian, written and drawn by Steve Bell from its creation in 1981.

In July 2020, Bell told the Press Gazette that If... would "probably" be coming to an end in 2021 due to forthcoming budget cuts at The Guardian. The final If... strip was published on 29 April 2021.

== Style ==
If... is a sharp and cynical satirisation of British politics and current affairs from a left-wing perspective, named after the famous Rudyard Kipling poem. Suiting both Bell's anarchic artistic style and the paper's political stance, it consisted of a short (usually three-panel) daily episode in each Monday to Thursday edition of the paper, with subjects usually covered in these four-day-long segments. If... occasionally utilises wordplay and coarse humour – Bell is fond of using the pejorative British word "wanker" and its euphemistic variants, for example. With The Guardian's move to new presses, If... started to appear in full colour in September 2005. Initially, the title was reflected in the concept, with each week presenting a separate stand-alone story such as "If... Dinosaurs roamed Fleet Street", or "If The Bash Street Kids ran the country". This shifted into a different approach during the 1982 Falklands War, when Bell started to concentrate on two central characters: Royal Navy seaman Kipling and the Penguin he befriends.

== Caricatures ==
Many of the political and other public figures who are lampooned gain in-joke characteristics, which often build into plot strands of their own. Examples include:

=== Prime ministers ===
- Margaret Thatcher, depicted with a mad, staring eye, a pointed nose, wide neck, big hair and generally masculine features.
- John Major, who began appearing with underpants on the outside of the trousers of his suit, when it was claimed that he tucked his shirt into them. Bell referred to this as "the badge of an essentially crap Superman". (This report was false, having been made up by Alastair Campbell during his late days on the Daily Mirror. Nevertheless, it fitted popular perceptions of Major's naive suburban incompetence so well that many people today still believe it to be true.)
- Tony Blair, depicted with the same mad, staring eye as Margaret Thatcher and a very pointed head which, along with his ears, can be used to make any object (speed cameras, pylons, giant eye, poodle) represent him, playing upon his increasingly authoritarian image.
- Gordon Brown, depicted as a grumpy ruthless Scot and can be used to make any object (bear, snail, lion, Stalin) to represent him.
- David Cameron, initially portrayed as a jellyfish, later as a tumescent pink condom.

=== Leaders of the opposition ===
- Neil Kinnock, portrayed as a bald man in a suit spouting an endless stream of incoherent waffle.
- William Hague, portrayed as a squat figure (sometimes a schoolboy) with a very bulbous head like a light bulb or the Mekon.
- Iain Duncan Smith, portrayed as a blank-faced zombie.
- Michael Howard, portrayed as a vampire owing to comments about his apparent sinister personality by Tory Member of Parliament (MP) Ann Widdecombe and his ancestors being from Romania.
- Ed Miliband, portrayed as a badger or panda owing to the white streak in his hair.
- Jeremy Corbyn, portrayed as Obi-Wan Kenobi from the Star Wars film series.

=== Other political figures ===
- Donald Trump, portrayed as entirely orange, aside from his eyes, with tiny hands and a toilet seat and lid instead of a hairstyle.
- Ronald Reagan, whose persona mutated from a bumbling, heavily stage-managed actor into a senile yet dangerous robot with a missile like pointed head, including being deployed in space as a component of the Strategic Defense Initiative.
- George W. Bush as a chimpanzee, ignorant of events around him. Inspired by the film Bedtime for Bonzo, in which Ronald Reagan appeared with a chimp, Bell greeted Bush's election with a cartoon entitled "Bigtime for Bonzo", depicting Bush as Reagan's chimp. In war themed cartoons, the Bush-chimp sometimes appears dressed as Darth Vader, complete with banana-shaped lightsabre. After the 2006 mid-term elections he was occasionally depicted as a duck with a broken leg and a crutch - an obvious reference to his second-term status as a 'lame duck president'.
- Michael Heseltine as Tarzan with a loincloth on, sometimes over his suit, due to an incident in the House of Commons when he picked up and brandished the Mace (symbol of the authority of the monarch in parliament). Subsequently Michael Heseltine was portrayed as Mad Mike, a reference to Mad Mike Hoare the notorious British Mercenary who operated in Africa. This was when Michael Heseltine was appointed by Margaret Thatcher as UK Minister of Defence and on one occasion dressed in an army camouflage parka for an inspection of a Cruise Missile Base following the police and military eviction of an encampment of anti-nuclear protesters.
- John Prescott, as a dog called Market who Blair has had neutered, a reference to Blair's control over the left of the Labour Party. More recently portrayed as Yoda.
- George Osborne, as a pig with a 'cute, curly tail' which voters seemingly like and, more recently, in a gimp suit. Has also been portrayed as Darth Vader (though called 'Lord Bumnose').
- Labour politicians Tom Watson, Hilary Benn, John McDonnell, Ken Livingstone and Sadiq Khan have all been portrayed as characters from the Star Wars film series.
- Rebekah Brooks, portrayed as Medusa.

== Recurring characters ==
There are also numerous characters who come and go over time. These characters often have an exaggerated nonsensicality, fitting Bell's style - most obviously their politics, which are sometimes portrayed as hopelessly idealist. They include:

- Reginald Kipling, an everyman figure who served in the Falklands War. Kipling left the Navy on his return to Britain after the war, and spends much of the strip destitute or on the short end of some satirical device, such as being trained to be a High Court judge under a Government unemployment scheme. Reg is a committed socialist, and during the late 1980s, having finally having had his fill of Thatcher's Britain he defected to the Soviet Bloc. Bell made the point of depicting Reg as being much happier there, including starting a family with Geronya Baikal, despite the lower standard of living and human rights.
- The Penguin, who stowed away with Reg's return to the UK from the Falklands. At first, The Penguin mostly served as a vehicle to comment upon the absurdity of human affairs (e.g. "All I care about is fish, matey") and as a sounding board for Reg, but became increasingly politicised. Bell often uses the metaphor of obesity for wealth, and frequently The Penguin becomes overweight and highly materialistic; for example, becoming a stockbroker, running privatised prisons, or running a populist tabloid newspaper similar to Rupert Murdoch's The Sun. The Penguin is also embarrassed by his heritage, coming from a very reactionary family of penguins who live on the Falklands (his actual name is Prince Philip of Greece Penguin) and who are highly bigoted against albatrosses. Over the course of the strip the penguin has brought in his partner Gloria and fathered several children and grandchildren, including Prudence who, in a reference to mixed race children, had a lovechild with a rat. (The Penguin disapproved but later flippantly revealed he was himself half-albatross when drunk on rum). Occasionally the penguins live on the island of Rockall, where they occasionally set up a socialist commune.
- Chief Constable Gerald "Badger" Courage, a policeman of variable (but normally senior) rank and invariable corruption, and a face that looks like a bottom seen sideways.
- Harry Hardnose, a permanently drunk right wing journalist.
- John the Monkey, a cockney monkey who is highly street-smart and sharp-witted. John usually resides with the Penguins but is more of a free agent, tending to appear in roles The Penguin is unsuitable for, e.g. a benefit fraud investigator or tabloid plant amongst the Royal Family. Initially appeared as a henchman of "Badger" Courage ("I don't take bribes! The monkey does!").
- Monsieur l'Artiste, a French artist who is apparently a caricature of Bell himself. He speaks with a strong French accent, which Bell has used to introduce various spoof French words, including "ouanquère" meaning "wanker".
- Wally the Whale, enamoured of submarines.
- Numerous other animals including the original dinosaurs, turkeys, pandas, camels, rats, moles, sheep and cats, depending upon the strip's plot requirements. The camels are used for strips based in the Middle East, the (radioactive) moles and two-headed sheep for strips outside Sellafield, the pandas as misunderstood immigrants, and so on. The cats began with a long plot thread starring Bill Clinton's cat Socks and occasionally return as 'fat cat' businessmen. In strips depicting Islamic terrorists and fundamentalists, they are often represented as goats.
