= Cartoon Art Trust Awards =

- Current: 21st CAT Awards
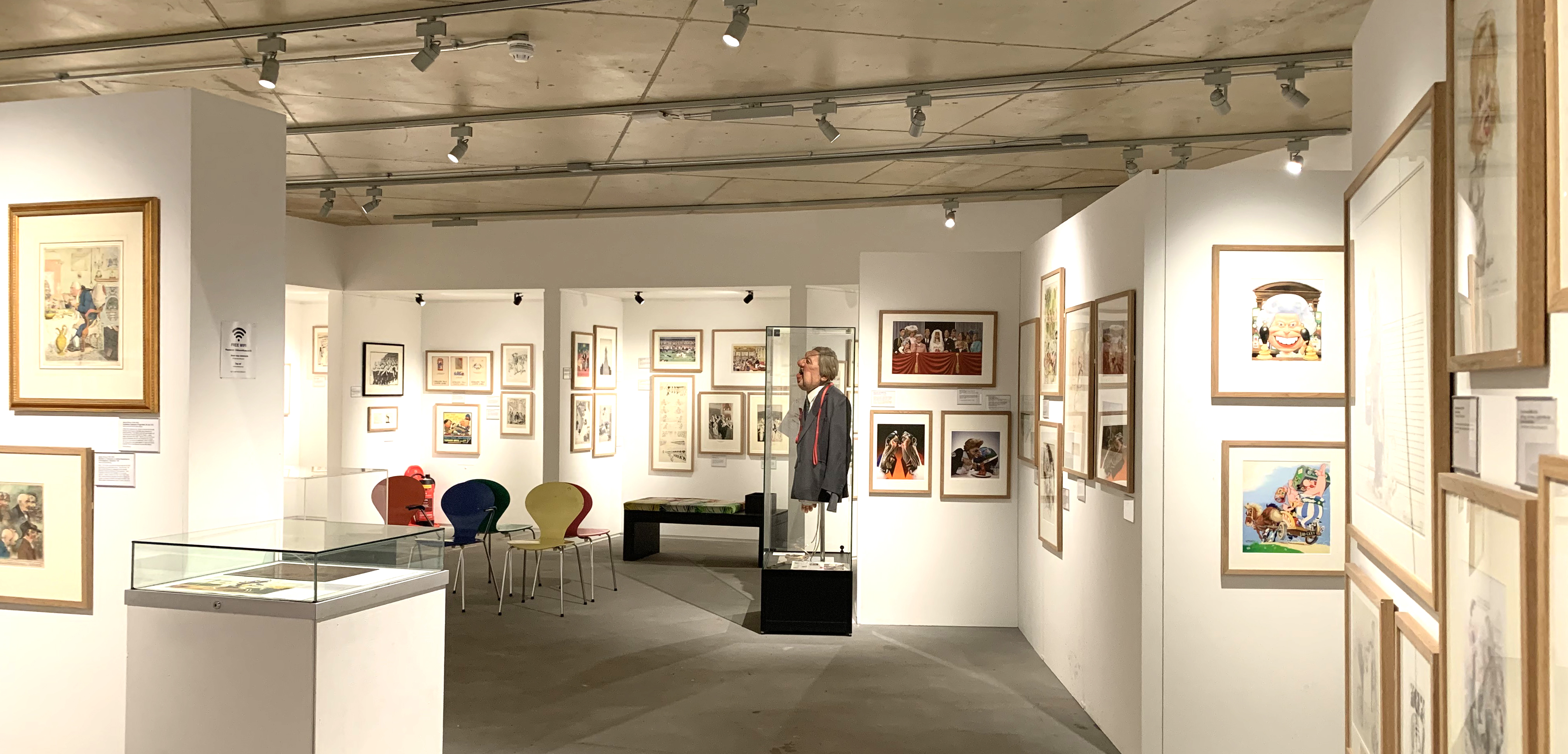
- Interior of the Cartoon Museum, London
- Awarded for: The best in cartoons
- Country: United Kingdom
- First award: 13 October 1996; 30 years ago
- Website: www.cartoonmuseum.org/about/awards

The Cartoon Art Trust Award or CAT Awards are presented in an annual award ceremony hosted by the Cartoon Art Trust (CAT), owners and operators of the Cartoon Museum, to honour the year's best cartoonists. The 21st Cartoon Art Trust Awards were held on 12 October 2017 at the Mall Galleries in London.

== History ==
The Cartoon Art Trust was formed in 1988 by a group of cartoonists and collectors, including the cartoonist Mel Calman, whose aim was to found a museum dedicated to "collecting, exhibiting, promoting and preserving the best of British cartoon art". In February 2006 the Cartoon Museum opened to the public at its current home in central London, close to the British Museum.

The museum declares it is "dedicated to preserving the best of British cartoons, caricatures, comics and animation, and to establishing a museum with a gallery, archives and innovative exhibitions to make the creativity of cartoon art past and present, accessible to all for the purposes of education, research and enjoyment."

== Annual ceremony ==
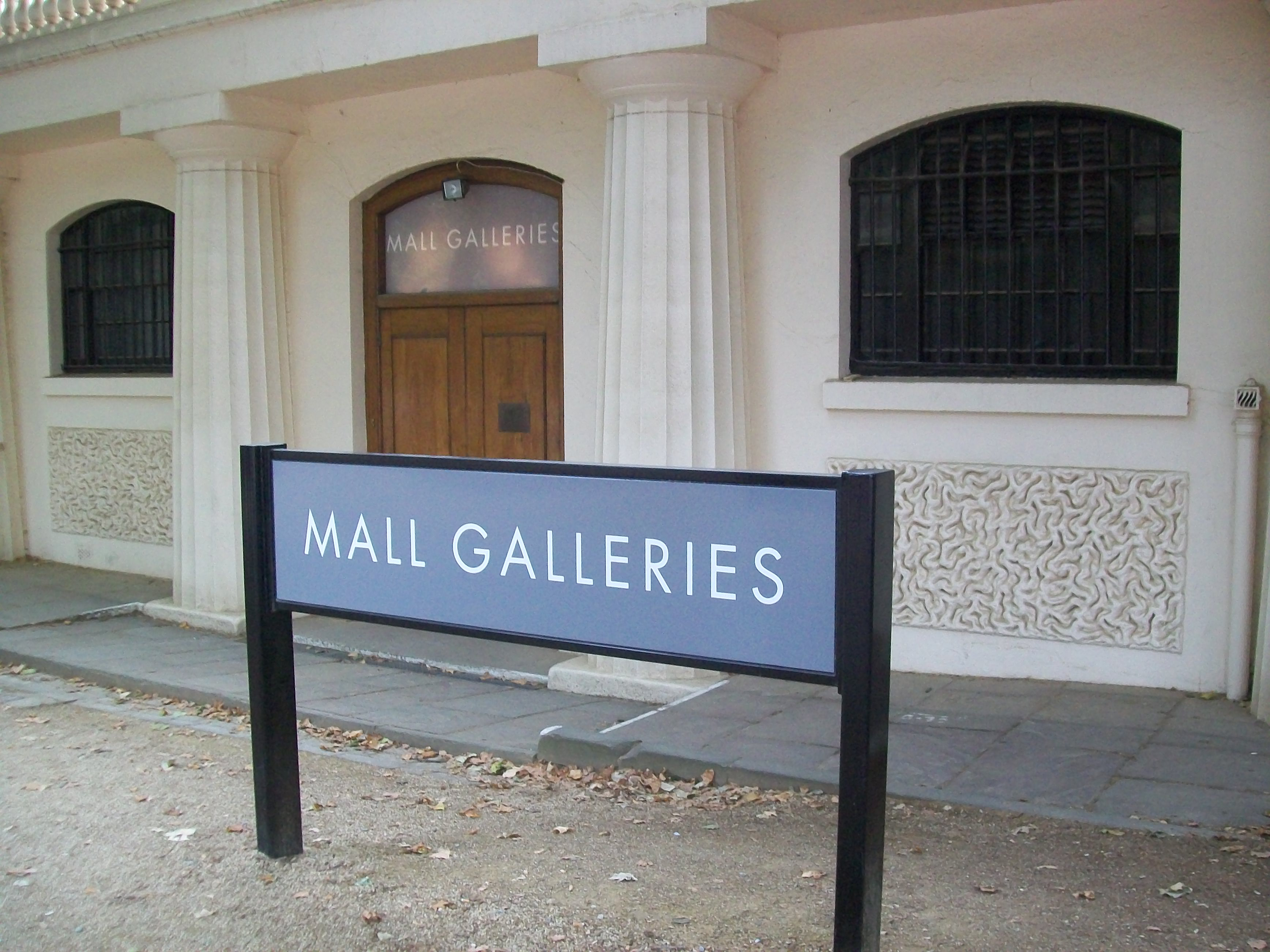
Entrance to the Mall Galleries

The ceremony takes place annually in October in London. The 21st CAT Awards were held at the Mall Galleries in London on 12 October 2017. The awards are sponsored by a number of newspapers including The Daily Mail, Private Eye and The Daily Telegraph. Among the cartoonists whose work has been recognised is Matt Pritchett who has won Best Pocket Cartoonist three times.

Event	Date
1st	1997
2nd	1998
3rd	1999
4th	2000
5th	2001
6th	2002
7th	2003
8th	2004
9th	2005
10th	2006
11th	2007
12th	2008
13th	2009
14th	2010
15th	2011
16th	2012
17th	2013
18th	2014
19th	October 2015
20th	October 2016
21st	12 October 2017

== Awards categories ==
- British Cartoonists' Association Young Cartoonist of the Year Award
- CAT Award for Joke Cartooning
- CAT Award for Strip Cartooning
- CAT Award for Caricature
- CAT Award for Political Cartooning
- The Pont Cup for drawing The British Character
- The Heneage Cup: The Cartoon Art Trust Lifetime Achievement Award

== See also ==
- British Cartoonists' Association
- Cartoon Art Trust
- Cartoon Museum
- Young Cartoonist of the Year Award
