= Kipper Williams =

English cartoonist (born 1951)

- Born: 30 December 1951 (age 74); Wirral, Cheshire, England
- Education: University of Leeds
- Known for: Satirical cartoons

Christopher "Kipper" Williams (born 30 December 1951) is a cartoonist who draws for newspapers, magazines, audio visual presentations and greetings cards. His clients include The Guardian, the Sunday Times, the Spectator, Private Eye, Country Life, John Lewis Gazette, Broadcast, Engineering and Technology, Radio Times, Coaching at Work, and Fitzrovia News. He was also a longstanding contributor to music magazine Smash Hits.

He was born on the Wirral, Cheshire, on 30 December 1951, the son of Aubrey Williams, a local government officer. His nickname "Kipper" came from a childhood pronunciation of "Christopher." He attended Ellesmere Port Grammar School, and from 1970 to 1974 studied fine art at Leeds University, where, he remembered, "cartoons were my reaction against traditional fine art and painting." At Leeds he was a friend of Steve Bell.
