= Thomas Harry Saunders =

British businessman (1813–1870)

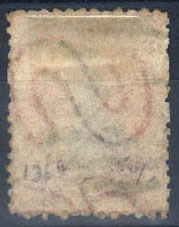
New Zealand two pence stamp from between 1855 and 1872 shows an S and part of the R from the T. H. Saunders watermark

Thomas Harry Saunders (19 September 1813, London – 5 February 1870, Dartford), usually called T. H. Saunders, was a British paper-maker known especially for his watermarks, and also a philanthropist.

He was the youngest of the five children of hoop-maker John Saunders, and started a career in paper-making while in his twenties, becoming partner in a paper mill in 1840. He married Mary Marchant in 1844.

He won medals at international exhibitions for his firm's light and shade watermarks, which contributed to his success at the Great Exhibition in London in 1851. At the Irish exhibition of 1853 there was special mention for his "specimens of paper ornamented with a water mark, showing gradations of light and shade". The description continued, "This kind of paper is intended to prevent frauds in bills of exchange . . ." and the watermarks attracted many banks as customers, and made T. H. Saunders & Co important suppliers of postage stamps and banknotes to many countries in Europe, the British Empire and South America. The technology for this had been invented by William Henry Smith, and the design was created by "thin brass plates upon the bottom of the mould". In 1855, Saunders represented England at the Exposition Universelle des produits de l’agriculture, de l’industrie et des beaux-arts, in Paris. Specifically for the event, T.H. Saunders & Co. created and exhibited a large paper sample book entitled "Illustrations of the British Paper Manufacture", containing 151 paper samples divided into three categories: papers made by hand, papers made by machine, and special papers.

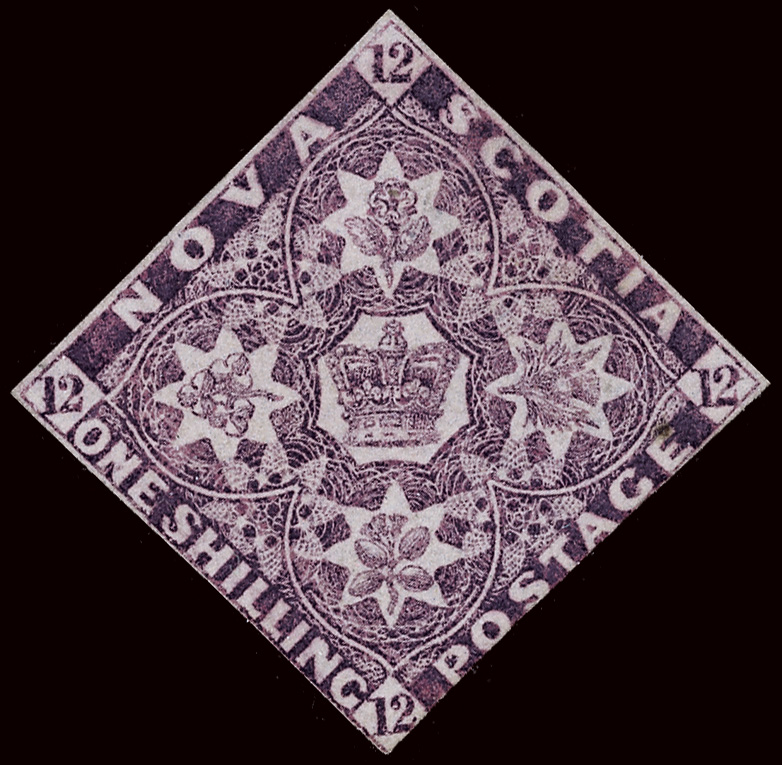
Nova Scotia stamp from 1851 using T. H. Saunders watermarked paper

Saunders built up a business with six paper mills, one of them the renovated Phoenix Mill at Dartford in Kent. As well as secure, watermarked paper they also produced bulk products like newsprint for The Times. With one of his managers he patented improved systems for drying paper and regulating the supply of pulp. He twice met Palmerston, the prime minister, to discuss the taxation system as it related to paper manufacturing.

He was an active nonconformist Christian who gave generously to charity and paid the salary of a metropolitan missionary. As a supporter of the Shaftesbury Society which promoted ragged schools, he set up reading and writing classes for children from his mills. He was also a member of the Royal Society of Arts.

The paper business continued at various mills along the River Darent after Saunders' death in 1870. T. H. Saunders' name is still a registered trademark for drawing and watercolour paper, now produced as Saunders Waterford paper in Somerset.
