= Kevin Woodcock =

- Born: Kevin Robert Woodcock; 2 September 1942; Leicester, England, UK
- Died: 2 July 2007 (aged 64); Leicester, England, UK
- Education: Leicester College of Art
- Occupation: cartoonist

Kevin Robert Woodcock (2 September 1942 – 2 July 2007) was a British cartoonist.

Kevin Woodcock was born at Leicester General Hospital. After attending Holmfield Avenue Junior School in Leicester and the Dixie Grammar School in Market Bosworth, Kevin Woodcock studied at the Leicester College of Art from 1961 to 1964.

He contributed cartoons to such publications as Private Eye, Daily Sketch, The Spectator, Knave, Fiesta, Brain Damage, Punch and The Oldie.

== Publications ==
Additionally, he published three collections of his work: Private Eye Kevin Woodcock (1978), City Rules OK (1983) and You Are Here: the Best of Kevin Woodcock (1987). More than 40 of his single-panel cartoons were reproduced in the Penguin Book of Private Eye Cartoons.
