= Steve Bell (cartoonist) =

English political cartoonist (born 1951)

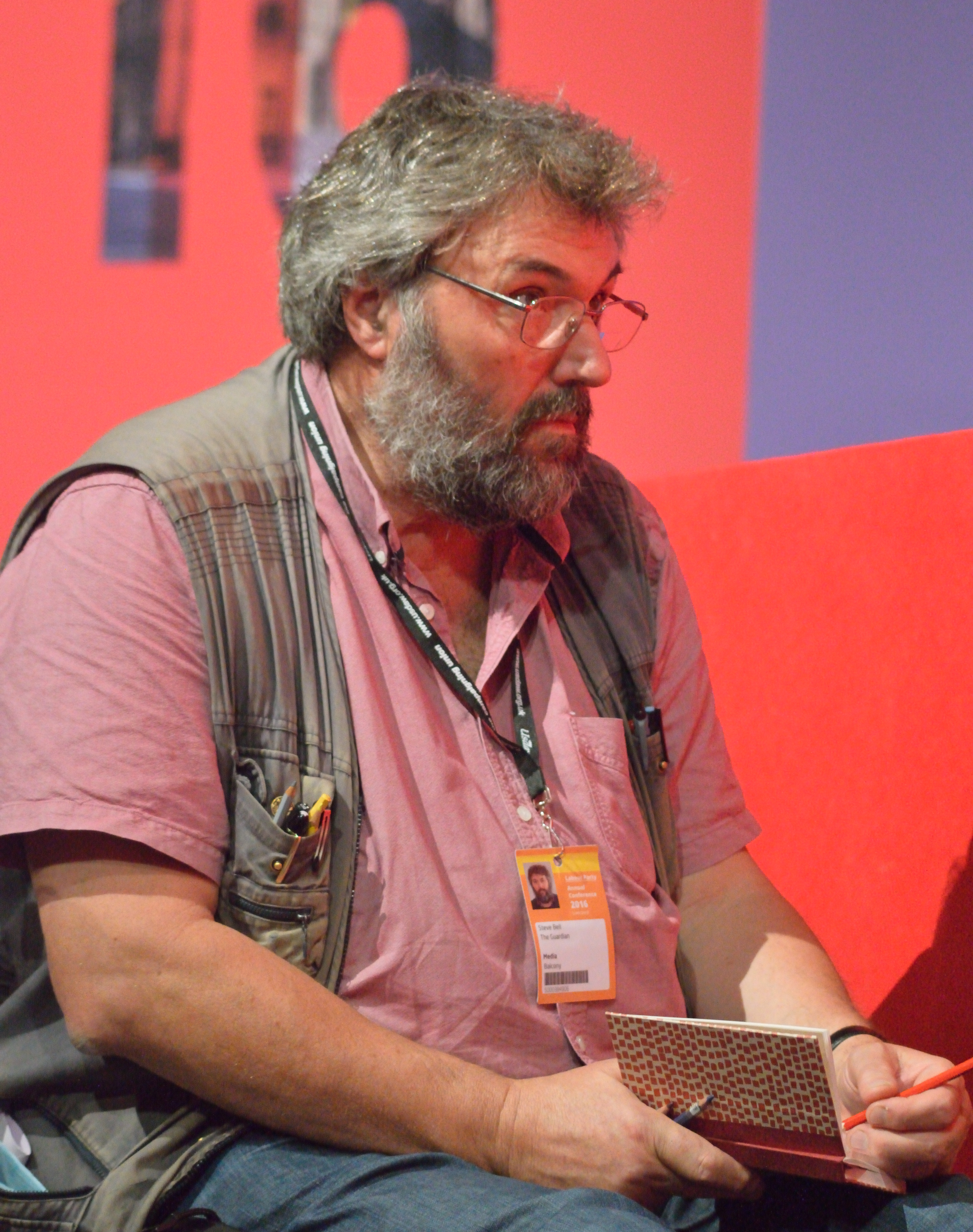
- Bell working at the 2016 Labour Party Conference
- Born: Steven William Maclean Bell; 1951 (age 74–75); Walthamstow, Essex, England
- Education: Teesside College of Art; University of Leeds; St Luke's College, Exeter
- Occupations: Political cartoonist, artist
- Website: www.belltoons.co.uk

Steven William Maclean Bell (born 1951) is an English political cartoonist, whose work has appeared in a number of publications, notably The Guardian from 1981 to 2023. He is known for his left-wing views.

== Early life ==
Born in Walthamstow and raised in Slough, Bell moved with his family in 1968 to North Yorkshire, where he trained as an artist at the Teesside College of Art. He graduated in film-making and art from the University of Leeds in 1974 and trained as an art teacher at St Luke's College (now St Luke's Campus at the University of Exeter), in 1975. He taught art at a secondary school in Birmingham for one year, a period of his life he would later call "the worst year of my life" and "Hell on Earth", before resigning in 1977 to become a freelance cartoonist.

== Cartoonist ==
While still teaching, Bell did unpaid work providing the magazine Birmingham Broadside with illustrations, including a comic strip featuring Maxwell the Mutant who changed into someone different every time he drank a pint of mild.

He had been a friend at university with another student, Kipper Williams, who had become a freelance cartoonist. Bell followed his lead, and some contacts, and despite rejections including being turned down for The Beano he persevered and obtained paid work for part of 1978 with the comic strip Dick Doobie the Back to Front Man for Whoopee!. He made repeated attempts to get work in the London listings magazine Time Out.

When the premiership of Margaret Thatcher began in May 1979, Time Out's news editor Duncan Campbell invited Bell to meet the need for a comic strip on the new government. Maggie's Farm, with animal characters, appeared in Time Out from 1979 to May 1981, then from October 1981 in City Limits. Bell produced another comic strip, Lord God Almighty, for The Leveller during 1980 and 1981. In 1980 he contributed a cartoon interpretation of the lyrics to Ivan Meets G.I. Joe to the inner lyric bag of the Clash's triple album Sandinista! He is probably best known for the daily strip called If..., which appeared in The Guardian newspaper from 1981 until 2021, and from the mid-1990s until 2023 he was also that newspaper's principal editorial cartoonist.

Collections of his cartoons have been published, and he has also illustrated original books in collaboration with authors. He has made short animated films with Bob Godfrey, including a short series of animated cartoons for Channel 4 television in 1999 to mark the 20th anniversary of Margaret Thatcher's rise to power, entitled Margaret Thatcher – Where Am I Now? He has appeared in a radio programme about the life of 18th-century caricaturist James Gillray. Earlier in his career, he wrote and drew the Gremlins comic strip for the British comic Jackpot.

Bell's parodies include Goya's The Sleep of Reason Produces Monsters (in an editorial cartoon about the UK Independence Party); William Hogarth's The Gate of Calais about the ban on UK meat exports following outbreaks of foot-and-mouth disease and bovine BSE; and – before the 2005 United Kingdom general election when it briefly seemed as if the Liberal Democrats might seriously threaten the Labour Party – J. M. W. Turner's The Fighting Temeraire, in which a chirpy Charles Kennedy as tug-boat towed a grotesque and dilapidated Tony Blair to be broken up. Following the death of Thatcher, for his cartoon the next day, 9 April 2013, Bell adapted an illustration by Gustave Doré of Farinata in Dante's Inferno, giving Thatcher the speech bubble "Why is this pit still open??" with reference to the closure of coal mines after the UK miners' strike (1984–85).

Bell's cartoons regularly feature grotesque caricatures, and have sometimes caused controversy as well as receiving critical acclaim. During the November 2012 Israel/Gaza conflict The Guardian published a cartoon by Bell showing the Israeli prime minister Benjamin Netanyahu as a puppeteer controlling William Hague and Blair. Dave Rich, blogging for the Community Security Trust, said that the illustration was comparable to those featured in Nazi and other antisemitic publications. While Bell defended his cartoon, the newspaper's readers' editor Chris Elliott concluded in an article on 25 November: "While journalists and cartoonists should be free to express an opinion that Netanyahu is opportunistic and manipulative, in my view they should not use the language – including the visual language – of antisemitic stereotypes." The UK's Press Complaints Commission received 22 complaints, but ruled on 19 December that it was unable to take the matter further and that it was "unable to establish a breach of the Code".

In the run-up to the 2015 United Kingdom general election, there was outrage on Twitter over an If... cartoon strip depicting Scottish National Party (SNP) leader Nicola Sturgeon as refusing to compromise on their "core demand... for incest and Scottish country dancing". Numerous tweets branded Bell as racist, while others said that it was no more outrageous than his cartoons mocking other politicians. There were more than 300 complaints made to The Guardian and nearly 1,000 comments under the online cartoon, mostly negative. The wording referred to a quotation attributed to Sir Arnold Bax, who said a Scottish friend had told him: "You should make a point of trying every experience once, excepting incest and folk dancing." During the 2014 Scottish independence referendum, Bell's cartoon strip depicted Sturgeon's "Yes" campaigning as promising "No Noness ... and Yes Yesness; Nationalism, Socialism: together they go so well!!"

In July 2019, Bell sent an angry email to The Guardian after his If... cartoon strip was pulled. The cartoon portrayed the then Deputy Leader of the Labour Party, Tom Watson, as the "antisemite finder general" for being critical of what he called antisemitism in the Labour Party. In June 2020, Home Secretary Priti Patel, while listing her experiences of racism in the House of Commons, mentioned a cartoon of Bell's published in The Guardian of being portrayed as "a fat cow with a ring through its nose, something that was not only racist but offensive, both culturally and religiously".

On 15 July 2020, The Guardian announced planning to cut jobs due to expected losses caused by the coronavirus pandemic. The Media Group said "We will discuss all our proposals, including redundancy terms, during collective consultation with our employee and trade union representatives." Online social media including Twitter spread a rumour that Bell's annual contract (due to expire in 2021) would not be renewed, without confirmation from The Guardian or from Bell himself. The UK Press Gazette was told by Bell that his annual freelance contract has always been a process of negotiation. For some time he had been in talks with editor-in-chief Katharine Viner about reducing his workload, and "Sadly this probably spells the end for the 'If…' strip after 39 and a half years, which I enjoy doing immensely, but is a hell of a lot of work for an old codger like me, particularly in full colour. I do hope to continue after next April doing large editorial cartoons."

In October 2020, the Equalities and Human Rights Commission accused the Labour Party of having broken equalities laws regarding its handling of antisemitism allegations. Jeremy Corbyn said the problem had been "dramatically overstated" by political opponents, and his membership was immediately suspended. Bell produced a cartoon, published in The Guardian, of Keir Starmer presenting Corbyn's head on a platter, based on Caravaggio's portrayal of Salome with the Head of Saint John the Baptist from the biblical story in the New Testament. The Guardian received 32 complaints of antisemitism. Labour peer Lord Andrew Adonis described the cartoon as "repellent".

=== Dismissal from The Guardian ===
In October 2023, Bell announced that The Guardian would no longer be using his cartoons after 42 years of working together. This followed a cartoon Bell produced within the context of the Gaza war featuring Netanyahu, with his shirt open, wearing boxing gloves and holding a scalpel over a dotted shape of the Gaza Strip on his stomach. The caption reads: "Residents of Gaza, get out now." Due to what has been seen by some as a reference to Shakespeare's Shylock's "pound of flesh", it prompted accusations that it was antisemitic. Bell said that he was inspired by the 1960s "Johnson's Scar" cartoon by David Levine of then U.S. president Lyndon B Johnson within the context of the Vietnam War. In December 2023, former Guardian editor Alan Rusbridger commissioned Bell for the Christmas edition of Prospect magazine.

== Awards and honours ==
- Cartoonists' Club of Great Britain - Humorous Strip of The Year, 1984 & 1985
- What the Papers Say Awards - Cartoonist of the Year, 1994.
- Cartoon Art Trust - Political Cartoonist of The Year, 1995, 1997, 1999 & 2005
- Cartoon Art Trust - Strip Cartoonist of the Year, every year from 1996-98
- Political Cartoon Society - Cartoon of the Year, 2001 & 2008
- British Press Awards - Cartoonist of the Year, 2003
- Political Cartoon Society - Cartoonist of the Year, 2005 & 2007
- Honorary degrees from the Universities of Teesside, Sussex, Loughborough, Leeds and Brighton
