= Media Diversity Institute =

Non-government organization

The Media Diversity Institute (MDI) is a London-based non-governmental organisation working with the media to improve reporting on ethnicity, religion, gender, sexuality and other diversity issues.

The mission of MDI is to promote "responsible journalism as a means to improve inter-community relations, increase tolerance and encourage dialogue among individuals and groups coming from different backgrounds."

MDI has worked with organisations such as Internews, the International Federation of Journalists, Article 19, and the European Federation of Journalists. MDI is also a member of the Ethical Journalism Network.

== Background ==
MDI was founded in 1997 by journalist Milica Pesic, who was working at the time for NYU Center for War, Peace and the News Media. MDI works on an international scale, but has a European focus.

MDI works to engage, educate and train the actors in society who have influence over media coverage of diversity. This includes media decision makers (owners, editors, managers), journalists, academics, students, Civil Society Organisations and governmental organisations. They also organise conferences on these topics.

== Projects ==
MDI's first large scale media diversity project, The Reporting Diversity Network (RDN), was launched at a conference in November 1998 with keynote speakers Michael Ignatieff and Jean-Paul Marthoz. RDN's work focused on Central and Eastern Europe as well as the newly independent former Soviet states. They have also been involved in addressing the deaths of Romani journalists and editors.

Other projects that MDI have been involved in include Dune Voices, Get the Trolls Out, and Media Against Hate.

== In other media ==
The collaboration between MDI and Twitter in developing a guide on countering hate speech was referred to in an article in the Financial Times, October 17, 2016.

A video broadcast produced by MDI's Dune Voices project was published on the BBC website on 30 December 2016.

MDI contributed to the Journal for Applied Journalism and Media Studies in 2017. MDI's founder Milica Pesic presented concrete and detailed examples of how MDI has worked to promote inclusive journalism and diversity in the media in many different countries and regions.
