= British Cartoonists' Association =

- Formation: 1966; 60 years ago
- Founders: Kenneth Mahood, John Jensen
- Type: Cartoonists organization
- Purpose: Professional support and networking
- Location: London
- Region served: United Kingdom
- Members: 100
- Chair: Nicola Jennings

The British Cartoonists' Association is an association of British Cartoonists. The BCA awards the annual Young Cartoonist of the Year Award which is presented annually at the Cartoon Museum in London, England, hosted by the BCA. The BCA Chair is the cartoonist Nicola Jennings and the secretary is the Kasia Kowalska.

== History ==
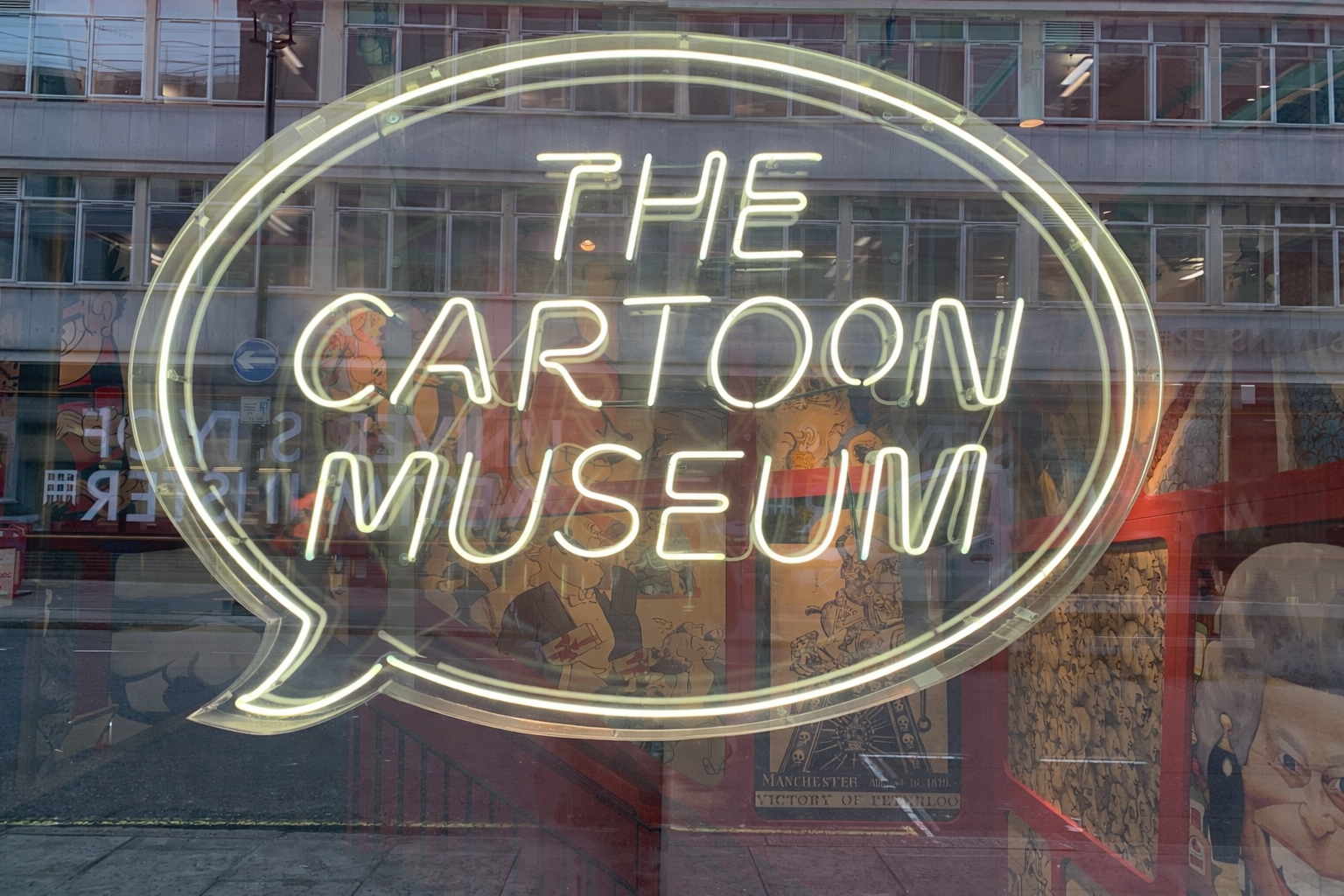
Cartoon Museum, Wells St, Fitzrovia

The BCA was co-founded in the 1966 by a number of cartoonists including Kenneth Mahood, who drew cartoons for Punch Magazine, The Times and the Daily Mail, and John Jensen.

Among its current members is the cartoonist Oliver Preston, President of the Cartoon Art Trust which owns and operates the Cartoon Museum. Also a member is the cartoonist Sally Artz, who has served as vice-president; Artz was also a founder member of the Cartoonists' Club of Great Britain.

== See also ==
- Cartoon Art Trust
- Cartoon Art Trust Awards
- Cartoon Museum
- The Cartoonists' Club of Great Britain
- Society of Strip Illustration
- Young Cartoonist of the Year Award
