= Martin Rowson =

British editorial cartoonist and writer (born 1959)

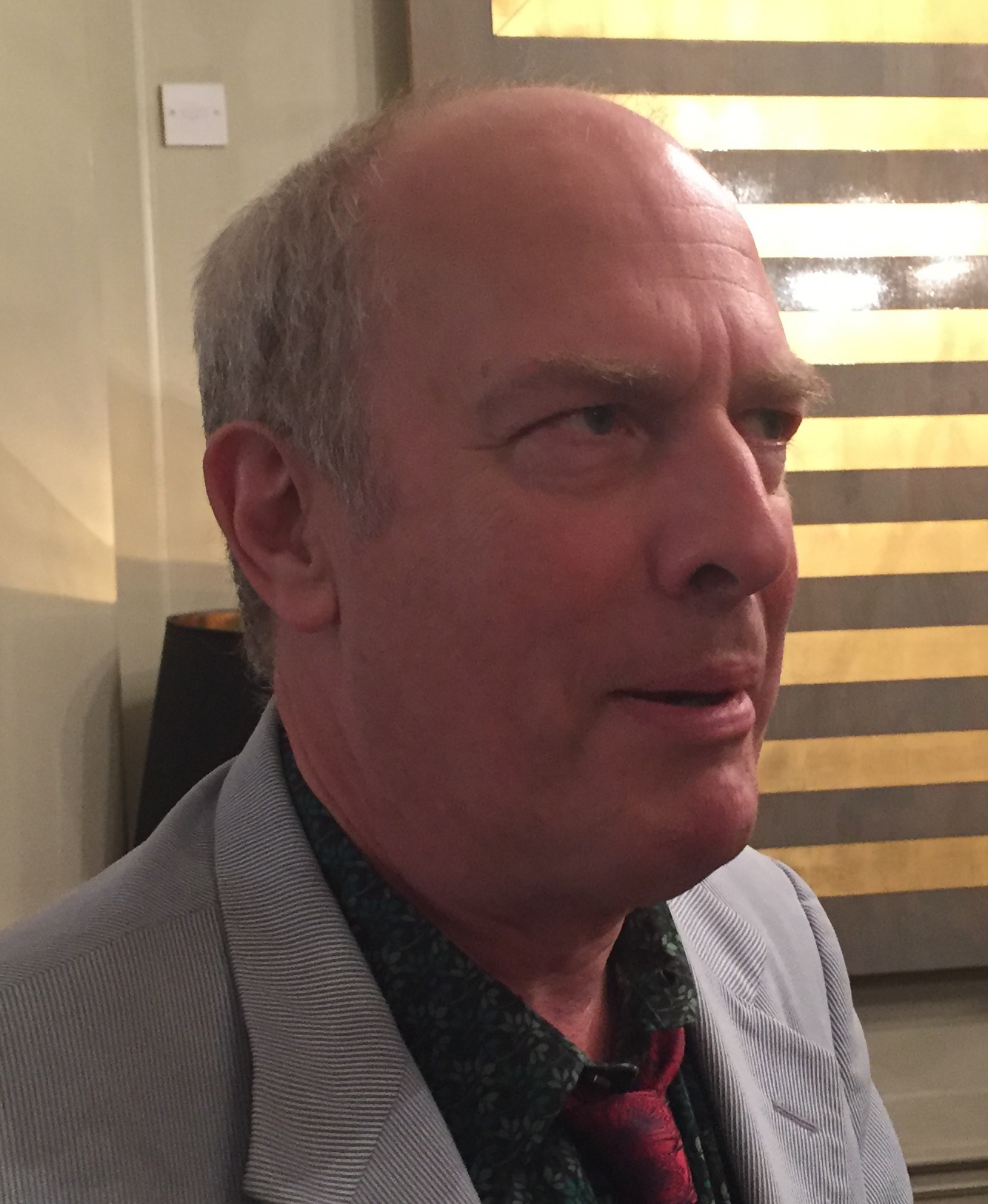
- Rowson at a British Cartoonists' Association event in May 2018
- Born: 15 February 1959 (age 67); England
- Education: Pembroke College, Cambridge
- Known for: Political cartoons
- Website: www.martinrowson.com

Martin Rowson (/ˈroʊsən/ ROH-sən; born 15 February 1959) is a British editorial cartoonist and writer. His genre is political satire and his style is scathing and graphic. He characterises his work as "visual journalism". His cartoons appear frequently in The Guardian and the Daily Mirror. He also contributes freelance cartoons to other publications, such as Tribune, Index on Censorship and the Morning Star. He is chair of the British Cartoonists' Association.

== Early life ==
Rowson was adopted as a child, and educated at the independent Merchant Taylors' School in Northwood in north-west London, followed by Pembroke College, Cambridge, where he studied English Literature.

== Career ==
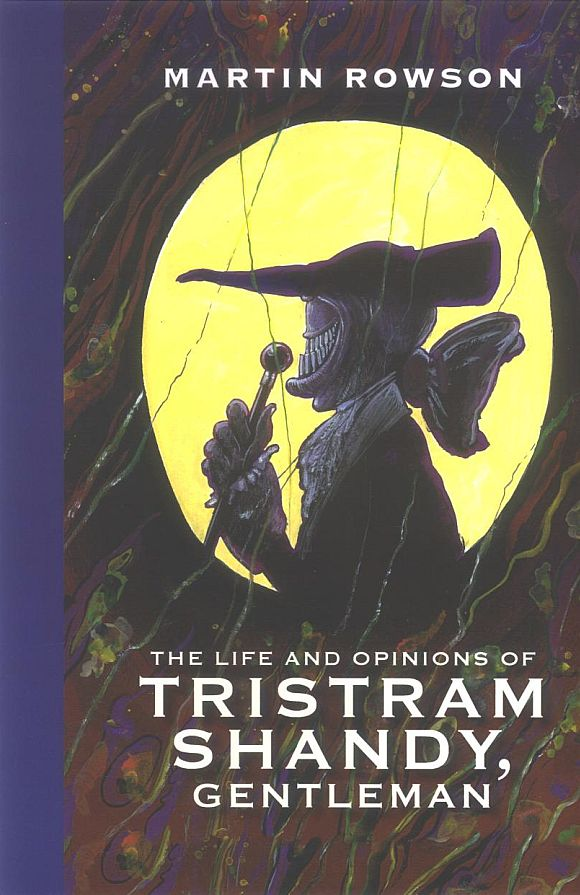
Cover of Tristram Shandy by Martin Rowson

In the late 1990s, Rowson was resident Cult Books Expert on Mark Radcliffe’s late-night Radio 1 show, a role, which he took over from his friend Will Self. Rowson's own books include graphic adaptations of The Waste Land and Tristram Shandy. His novel Snatches, published in 2006 (ISBN 0-224-07604-3), is a comic journey through history, focusing on the "stories of the worst decisions the human race has ever made". Stuff (2007), his next novel, is part autobiography, part history of his family and upbringing. He also drew original cartoons for the title sequence of the film Pride and Prejudice and Zombies.

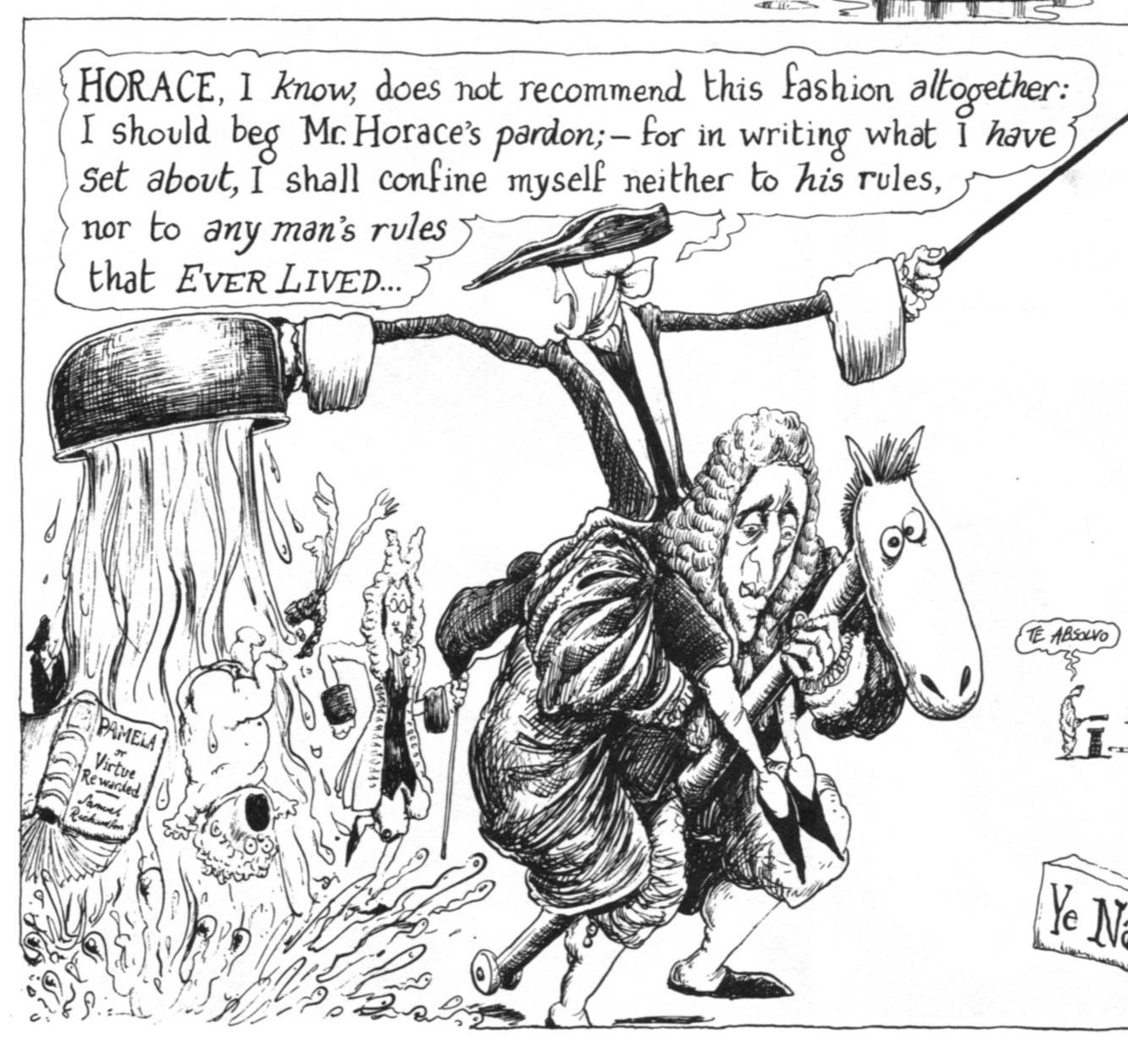
Horace I know... – Detail from page 7 of Rowson's Tristram Shandy

In 2008, he published The Dog Allusion: Gods, Pets and How to Be Human, arguing that religion is a complete waste of time and money — much like keeping pets. (The title is itself an allusion to the Richard Dawkins book The God Delusion.) In 2014, The Coalition Book, containing a collection of cartoons, and a written account, of the four years of the coalition government, was published by Self Made Hero. Rowson is an Honorary Associate of the National Secular Society and a distinguished supporter and board member of Humanists UK.

Rowson was appointed "Cartoonist Laureate" of London when Ken Livingstone was Mayor, and his cartoons appeared in the Mayor's newsletter, The Londoner. In 2006, Rowson was awarded an Honorary Doctorate in Journalism from the University of Westminster. In 2014, he was appointed to an Honorary Fellowship by Goldsmiths, University of London.

On 15 September 2010, Rowson, along with 54 other public figures, signed an open letter published in The Guardian, stating his opposition to Pope Benedict XVI's state visit to the UK.

In June 2013, Rowson became the fifth trustee for People's Trust for Endangered Species, a wildlife conservation charity based in Battersea, south-west London.

=== Cartoon of Richard Sharp ===
On 29 April 2023, Rowson apologised on Twitter for his cartoon published by The Guardian that day, which included a caricature of Richard Sharp that was criticised as being antisemitic. Rowson tweeted: "Through carelessness and thoughtlessness I screwed up pretty badly with a Graun toon today & many people are understandably very upset. I genuinely apologise, unconditionally." Rowson later published a fuller response on his own website, clarifying his intentions when devising the cartoon and emphasising his deep regret at the offence caused.

Some hours after the initial publication, the Guardian removed Rowson's cartoon from their web edition stating: "The cartoon that was posted here today did not meet our editorial standards, and we have decided to remove it from our website."

The historian Simon Sebag Montefiore referred to the cartoon as "repellent" and "explicitly racist". Dave Rich, head of policy at the Community Security Trust charity, said that the cartoon "falls squarely into an antisemitic tradition of depicting Jews with outsized, grotesque features, often in conjunction with money and power". Rowson, who said that he knew Sharp was Jewish, commented: "His Jewishness never crossed my mind as I drew him as it's wholly irrelevant to the story or his actions, and it played no conscious role in how I twisted his features according to the standard cartooning playbook."

Shortly after these events, Rowson took an extended leave of absence from the Guardian (May to August 2023). In a comment piece published in the paper in July, he stated that he had been "consumed with deep, devouring shame" and felt he had "lost all sense of moral authority or even agency to draw anything or judge anyone". He also said that he had been "talking to lots of people, prominent and otherwise, from across the Jewish community both to atone and to help me understand how I could have done this terrible thing".

== Personal life ==
Rowson is married and has two children. Who's Who lists his interests as "cooking, drinking, ranting, atheism, zoos, collecting taxidermy". He is a supporter and trustee of the Zoological Society of London, having taken an active role in the campaign to cancel plans to close the organization's London Zoo in 1991, and since serving multiple terms on its governing council.

== Political views ==
In December 2019, along with 42 other leading cultural figures, Rowson signed a letter endorsing the Labour Party under Jeremy Corbyn's leadership in the 2019 general election. The letter stated that "Labour's election manifesto under Jeremy Corbyn's leadership offers a transformative plan that prioritises the needs of people and the planet over private profit and the vested interests of a few."

== Bibliography ==
- Rowson, Martin (1983). Scenes From The Lives of the Great Socialists. Grapheme Publications. ISBN 978-0946459025.
- Rowson, Martin (1990). The Waste Land. Harper Collins. ISBN 978-0060964764.
- Rowson, Martin (2005). Mugshots. Politico's Publishing Ltd. ISBN 978-1842750650.
- Rowson, Martin (2007). Snatches. Vintage. ISBN 978-0099485247.
- Rowson, Martin (2008). The Dog Allusion: Pets, Gods and How to be Human. Random House. ISBN 978-0099521334.
- Rowson, Martin (2008). Stuff: A Memoir of Death and Life. Vintage. ISBN 978-0099502654.
- Rowson, Martin (2008). Fuck: The Human Odyssey. Jonathan Cape. ISBN 978-0224084413.
- Rowson, Martin (2009). Giving Offence. Seagull Books. ISBN 978-1906497019.
- Rowson, Martin (May 2010). The Life and Opinions of Tristram Shandy, Gentleman. SELFMADEHERO. ISBN 978-1906838133.
- Rowson, Martin (November 2011). The Limerickiad Volume 1 – From Gilgamesh to Shakespeare. Smokestack Books. ISBN 978-0956814425.
- Rowson, Martin (March 2012). Gulliver's Travels. Atlantic Books. ISBN 978-1848872820.
- Rowson, Martin (November 2012). The Limerickiad Volume II – From Donne to Austen. Smokestack Books. ISBN 978-0956814494.
- Rowson, Martin (November 2013). The Limerickiad Volume III – From Byron to Baudelaire. Smokestack Books. ASIN B01HCA15MC.
- Rowson, Martin. The Communist Manifesto.
