= Cartoon Art Trust =

Registered charity

- Formation: 1989; 37 years ago
- Founder: Mel Calman
- Type: Registered Charity 327 978
- Purpose: Supporting cartooning and comics in the U.K.
- Headquarters: London, U.K.
- Region served: United Kingdom
- Official language: English
- Chairman: Oliver Preston
- Main organ: Cartoon Museum
- Affiliations: Cartoon Art Trust Awards

The Cartoon Art Trust is a charity founded in 1989 in the United Kingdom, which acts as the owner and operator of the London Cartoon Museum, and also runs the Cartoon Art Trust Awards. Its chairman is the cartoonist Oliver Preston.

== History ==
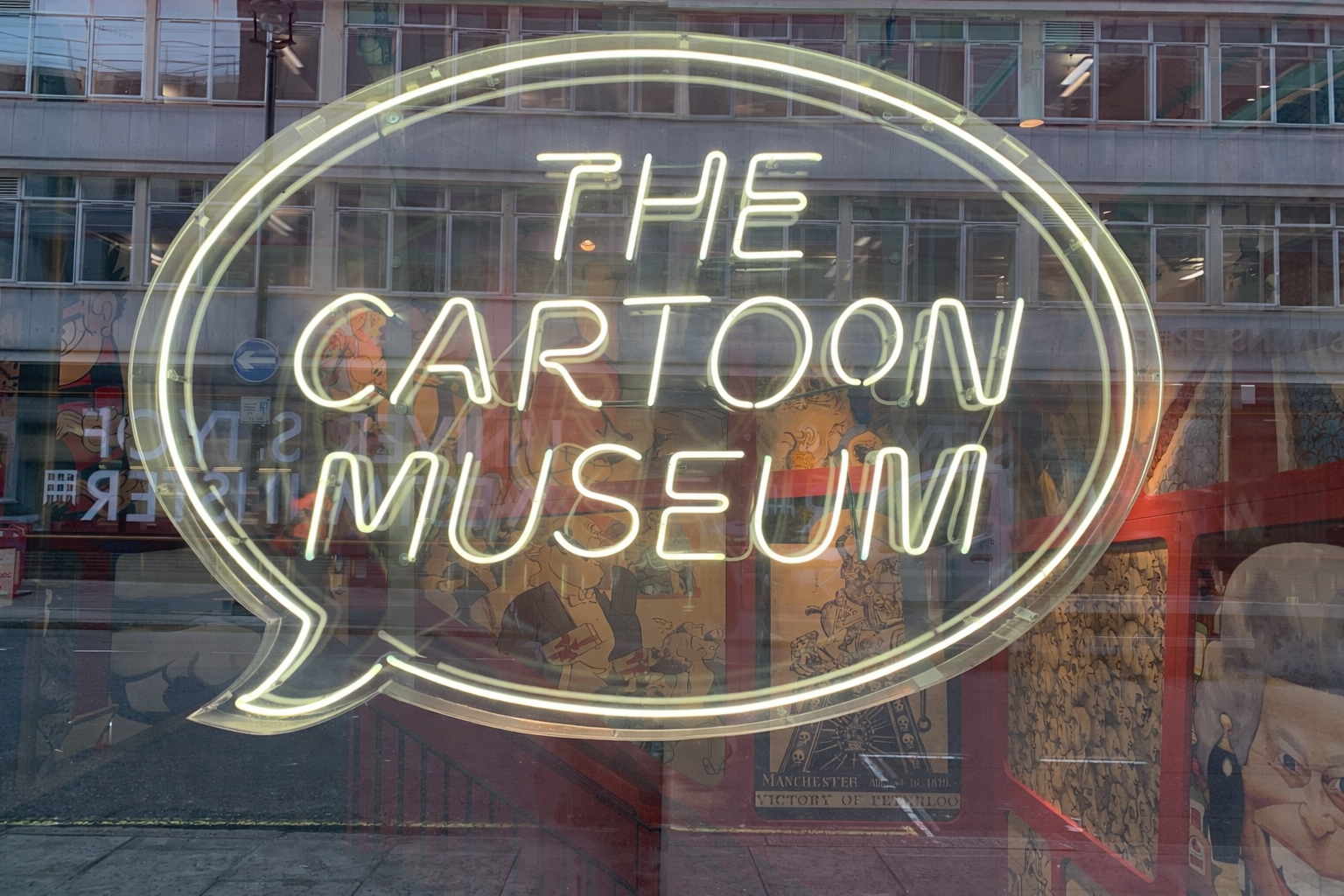
Cartoon Museum, Wells St, Fitzrovia

The Cartoon Art Trust was originally founded in 1989 by the cartoonist Mel Calman. For over 20 years the patron of the Cartoon Art Trust was Prince Philip, Duke of Edinburgh. Comics critic Paul Gravett served as director of the Trust from 1992 to 2001.

In 2006 the Cartoon Art Trust opened the Cartoon Museum in Fitzrovia, London, which was opened by Prince Philip. The Cartoon Museum is "dedicated to preserving the best of British cartoons, caricatures, comics and animation, and to establishing a museum with a gallery, archives and innovative exhibitions to make the creativity of cartoon art past and present, accessible to all for the purposes of education, research and enjoyment."

== Cartoon Art Trust Awards ==
The Cartoon Art Trust Awards are held annually and aim to recognize the best professional cartoonists of the year. The awards also serve to raise funds for the Cartoon Museum. The Cartoon Art Trust and The Cartoon Museum also hosts the annual Young Cartoonist of the Year Award.

== Trustees ==
As of August 2021 the trustees of the Cartoon Art Trust were Oliver Preston (chair), Lord Baker of Dorking (Vice-chair), Sheila O'Connell, Mike Russell, Steve Bell, Julian Bower, Martin Rowson, Shepherd (Colie) Spink, Mark Bryant, Hannah Berry and Alexander Williams.

== See also ==
- British Cartoonists' Association
- Young Cartoonist of the Year Award
