= Mel Calman =

British cartoonist (1931–1994)

- Born: Melville Calman; 19 May 1931 Stamford Hill, London, UK
- Died: 10 February 1994 (aged 62) London, UK
- Area: Cartoonist
- Notable works: "little man" cartoons

Melville Calman (19 May 1931 – 10 February 1994) was a British cartoonist best known for his "little man" cartoons published in British newspapers including the Daily Express (1957–63), The Sunday Telegraph (1964–65), The Observer (1965-6), The Sunday Times (1969–84) and The Times (1979–94).

== Early life ==
Born in Stamford Hill, North London, Calman was the youngest of the three children of Clement Calman, a timber merchant, and his wife, Anna both Russian-Jewish immigrants who came to England about 1912.

Evacuated to Cambridge to avoid the Blitz in World War II, he was educated at the Perse School. Failing to gain entrance to read English at the University of Cambridge, he returned to London where he enrolled at the Borough Polytechnic Art School. He served two years of National Service, then studied illustration at Saint Martin's School of Art.

== Career ==
In 1956, he began looking for work as a freelance cartoonist. Punch turned down his work, but in 1958 he contributed to the "William Hickey" column in the Daily Express. He left the Express after five years, seeing no prospects in competition with Osbert Lancaster and Carl Giles.

In 1962 he began drawing his trademark "little man" for the Sunday Telegraph, and in 1979 he brought it to The Times, where it ran regularly for several years. He also contributed to Cosmopolitan and House & Garden, and published some twenty books of cartoons.

Calman's trademark character was the angst-ridden "little man", who reflected Calman's own lifelong depression (in Who's Who he listed his recreations as "brooding and worrying"). Calman presented the little man's anxieties about health, death, God, achievement, morality and women, a style of humour that the Times described as "of the black, self-deprecating Jewish variety, in the style of his New York heroes James Thurber, S. J. Perelman and Woody Allen". A small-format single-frame "pocket cartoon", the little man series used hand-lettered text in soft pencil and minimal detail, a technique Calman had evolved due to his early weakness in draughtsmanship.

== Personal life ==
Calman was married twice, to the magazine designer Pat McNeill and to the artist Karen Elizabeth Usborne. He had two daughters with McNeill — the novelist Claire Calman and author and screenwriter Stephanie Calman. In later life he became an art dealer and collector, and in 1989 he co-founded the Cartoon Art Trust.

Calman died on 10 February 1994, of a heart attack at the Empire Cinema in Leicester Square while watching the film Carlito's Way with writer Deborah Moggach, his partner for the last ten years of his life. He is buried alongside his mother and sister at the Jewish cemetery in Waltham Abbey, Essex.

== Recognition ==
Calman is commemorated by a historical plaque at his former residence at 64 Linthorpe Road, Hackney, where he lived from 1931 to 1957.
