= The Cartoon Museum =

Museum in London, England

Cartoon Museum
- The Cartoon Museum

- Location within Central London
- Established: 2006; 20 years ago Reopened 1 July 2019
- Location: 63 Wells St; London, W1A 3AE; United Kingdom
- Coordinates: 51.5176°N 0.1386°W
- Type: the art of comics and cartoons
- Collection size: 4,000 plus original cartoons and prints
- Director: Beth Bryan
- Curator: Becky Luffman
- Public transit access: Oxford Circus
- Website: www.cartoonmuseum.org

The Cartoon Museum is a London museum for British cartoons, caricatures and comic strips, owned and operated by the Cartoon Art Trust (Registered Charity 327 978). It has a library of over 5,000 books and 4,000 comics. The museum issues catalogues and features a changing display of over 250 exhibits from its collection of over 4,000 original cartoons and prints. The museum is "dedicated to preserving the best of British cartoons, caricatures, comics and animation, and to establishing a museum with a gallery, archives and innovative exhibitions to make the creativity of cartoon art past and present, accessible to all for the purposes of education, research and enjoyment."

== History ==
=== Origins ===
As early as 1949 the cartoonist H. M. Bateman had called for the founding of a national museum of cartoons. The Cartoon Art Trust was formed in 1988 by a group of cartoonists and collectors, including the cartoonist Mel Calman, whose aim was to found a museum dedicated to "collecting, exhibiting, promoting and preserving the best of British cartoon art".

=== Little Russell Street location (2006–2018) ===
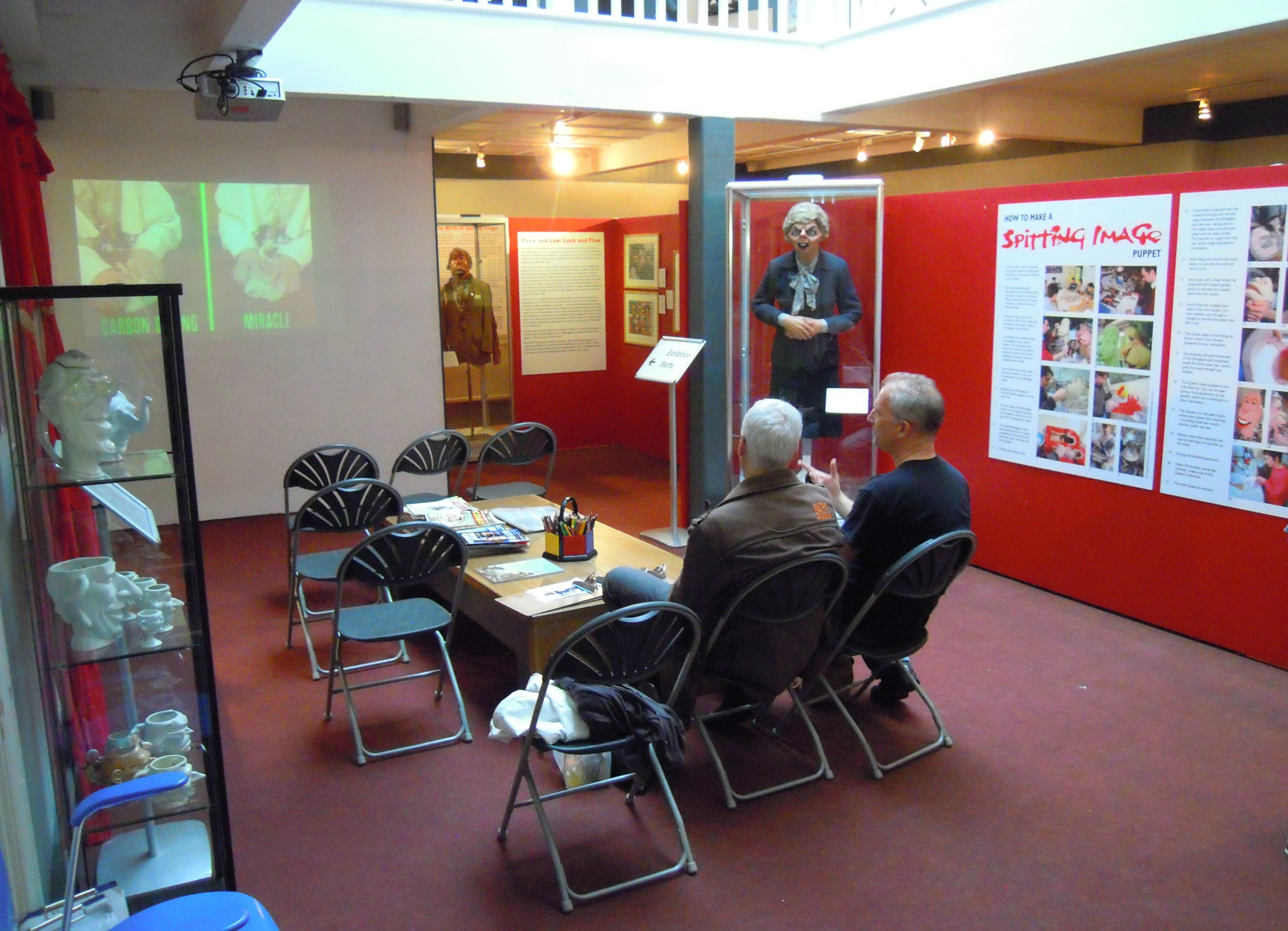
The main exhibition area in 2014, Little Russell Street location

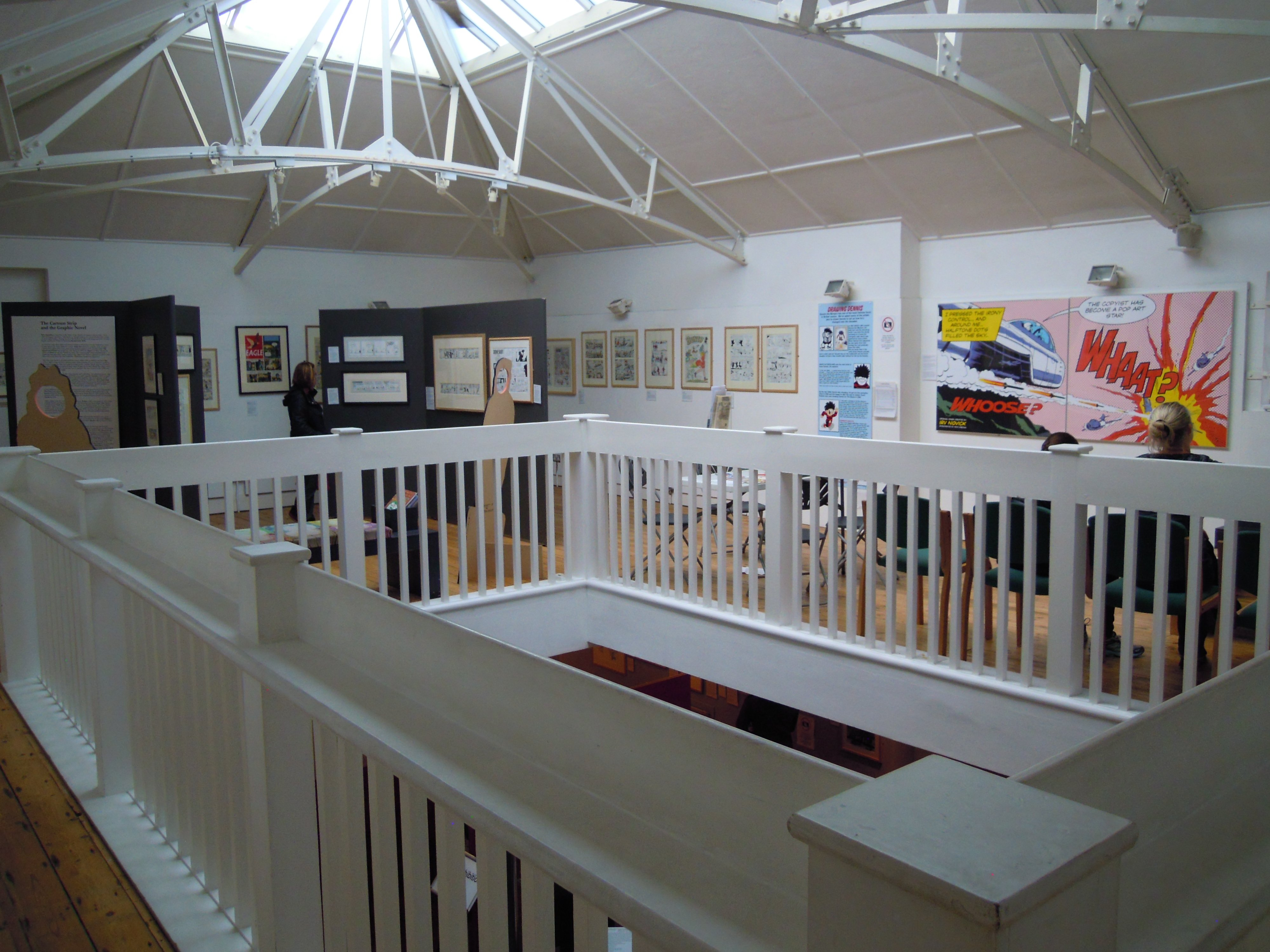
The first-floor exhibition area, Little Russell Street

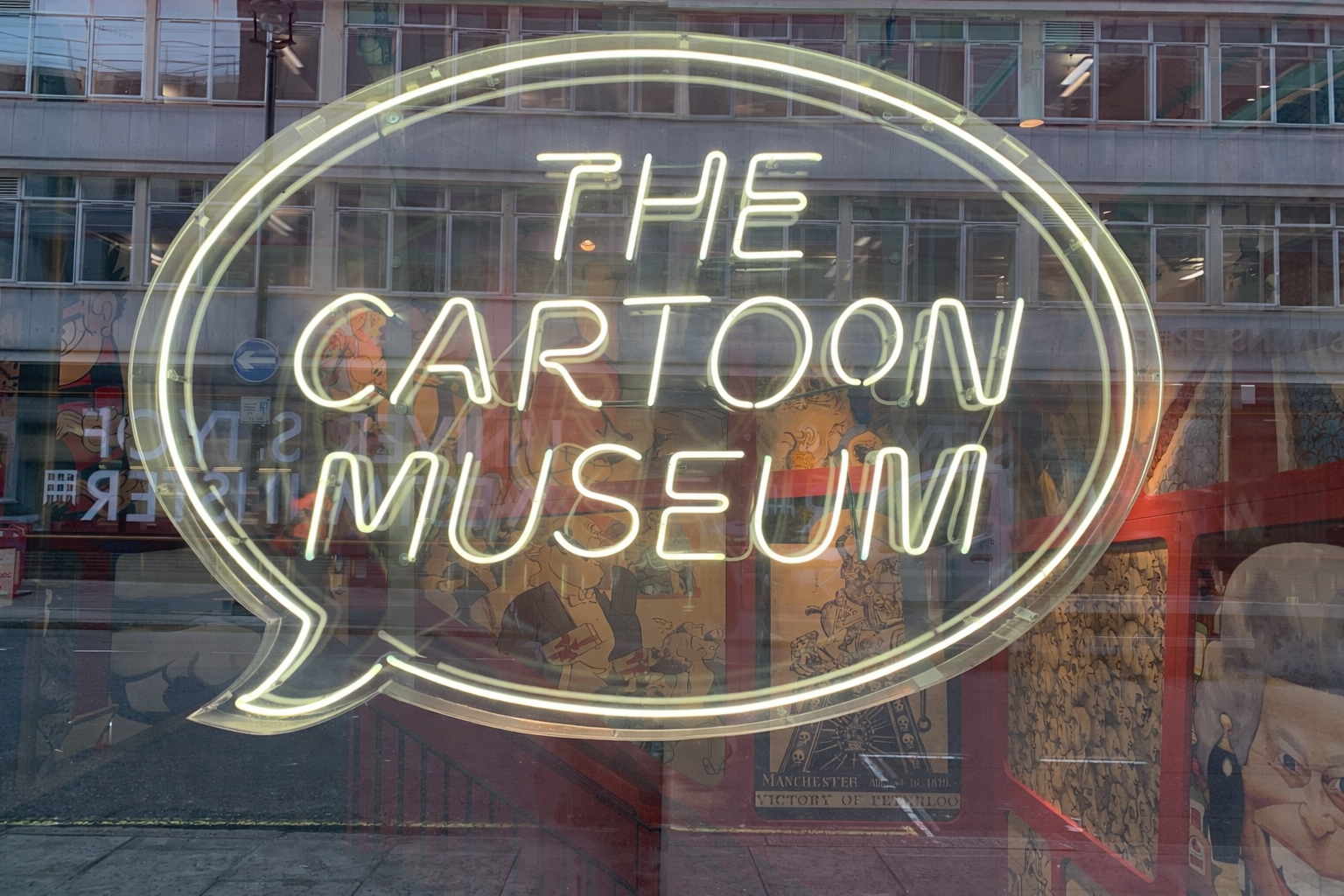
Cartoon Museum, Wells St

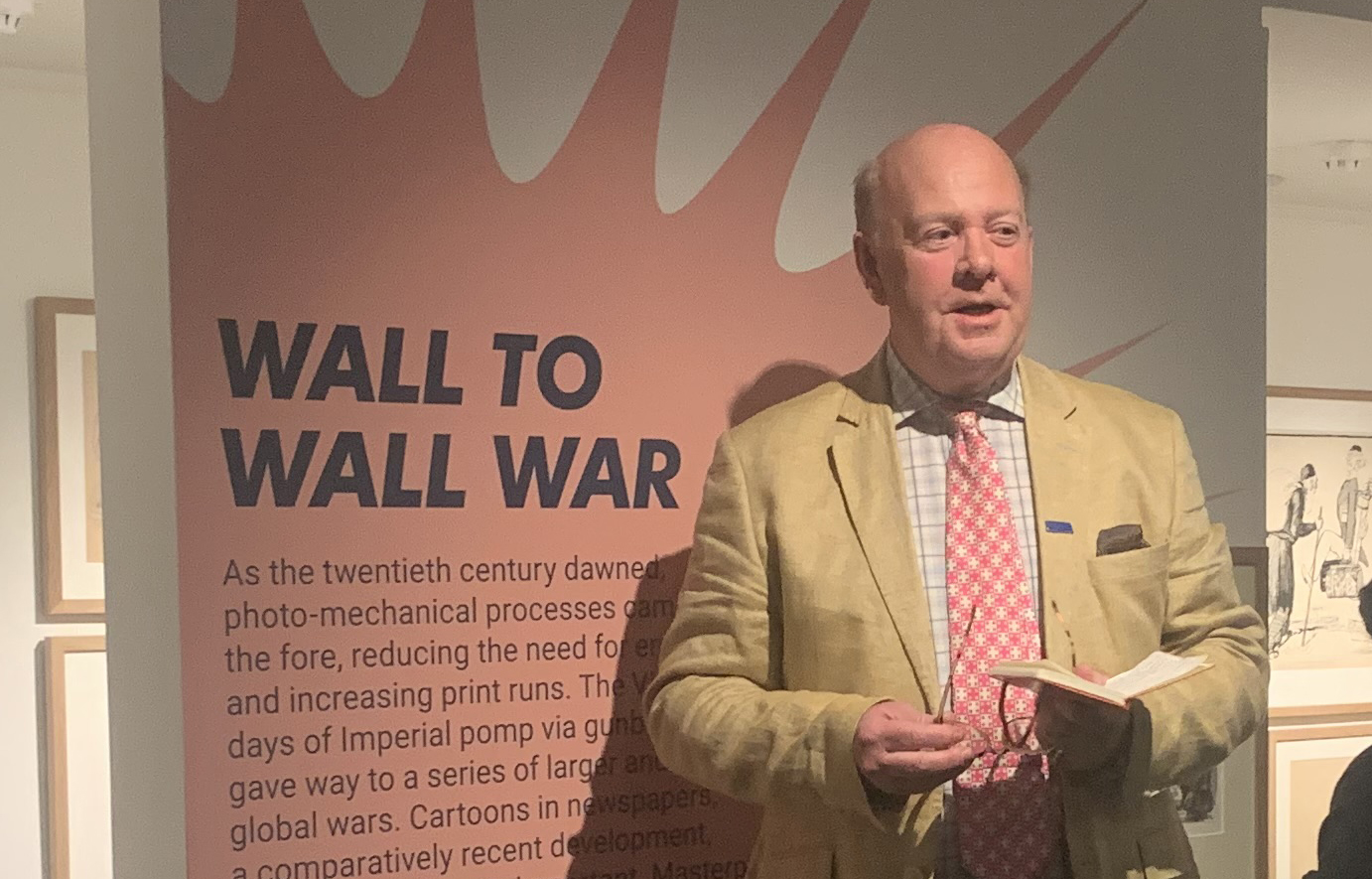
Oliver Preston at The Cartoon Museum in March 2026

The Cartoon Museum first opened on 23 February 2006 in Little Russell St, Fitzrovia, in Central London, following a £750,000 fundraising campaign led by cartoonist and Cartoon Art Trust chairman Oliver Preston. The museum was opened by The Duke of Edinburgh, who was patron of the Cartoon Art Trust for over 20 years, and had himself attended Bateman's talk at the Royal College of Art in 1949. The Duke "saw humour in everything". Director/Curator Anita O'Brien noted: "There has never been a cartoon museum [in Britain]... In spite of the very strong historical tradition here, there has always been a very strong ambivalence towards comic art." CAT chairman Oliver Preston stated that "Cartoons are art ...[but] they have never been treated as art and it's about time these cartoonists had a home where people could see their work".

The Cartoon Museum hosted many exhibitions of cartoon art, including in 2014 a 30th-anniversary celebration of the TV satire Spitting Image. The museum attracted 26,000 visitors a year but closed at Little Russell Street in late 2018, forced out by a substantial rent increase.

=== Wells Street location (from 2019) ===
Following a £1m fundraising campaign led by cartoonist and Cartoon Art Trust chairman Oliver Preston, the Cartoon Museum reopened in new, larger premises at 63 Wells Street, north of Oxford Street, on 1 July 2019, on a long-term lease in a new development with a peppercorn rent. The space was designed by Sam Jacob Studio. One of the first exhibitions was titled "Comic Creators: The Famous and the Forgotten", featuring classic cartoons such as Billy Bunter, Jonah, Desperate Dan, Dennis the Menace and Judge Dredd.

The new premises also includes a learning studio and a shop. The main exhibition gallery, which tells the story of the history of cartoons with examples selected from the museum collection, was curated by cartoonist Steve Bell, and includes "the best of British cartoon art". The collection spans 300 years of cartoons, beginning with the Georgian "Golden Age of Caricature", including James Gillray and George Cruikshank. In the early Eighteenth century British travellers to Europe on the Grand Tour brought back Italian caricatura, introducing polite society to the new art form.

The collection also includes work by wartime cartoonists such as David Low's All Behind You, and modern satirists such as Gerald Scarfe and Ralph Steadman.

In January 2020 a new museum director, Joe Sullivan, and a new curator, Emma Stirling-Middleton, were appointed. In 2020 The Cartoon Museum received a grant of £98,700 from the National Lottery Heritage Fund.

In June 2021 the museum re-opened after the COVID-19 lockdown with an exhibition of the art of V for Vendetta titled "Behind the Mask". In September 2021 The Cartoon Museum exhibited "Hidden Treasures", three previously unknown works by Ralph Steadman. In 2021 the Cartoon Museum was "highly commended" by the Museums and Heritage Awards for "Fundraisers of the Year". In November 2021 the museum opened "The Laughter Lab", an exhibition dedicated to exploring the science behind laughter, in association with evolutionary biologist Robin Dunbar.

== Exhibitions ==
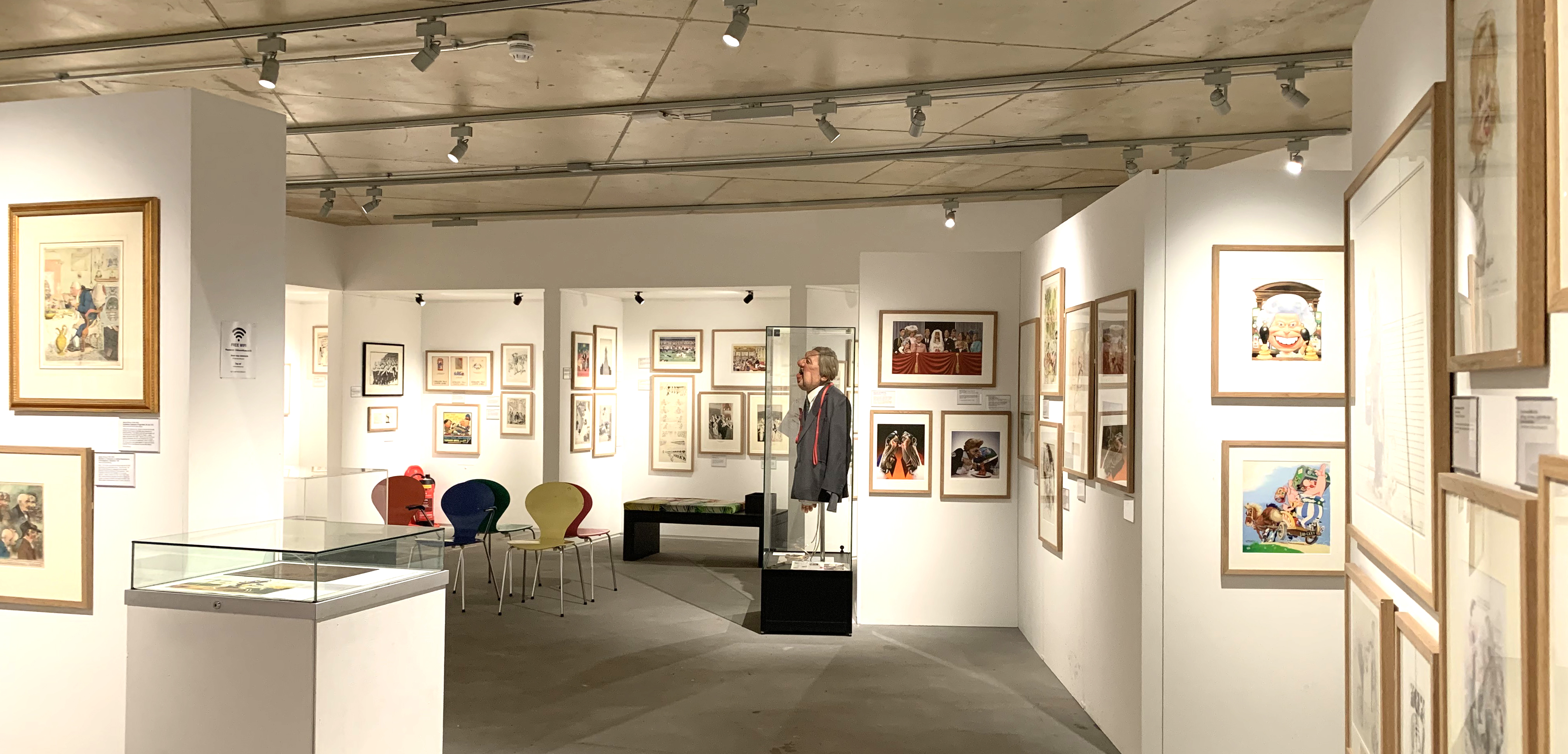
Cartoon Museum Interior, 2019

Previous exhibitions have included Ronald Searle, Pont, Fougasse, Rowland Emett, The Beano and The Dandy, Mike Williams, Mel Calman, cartoons from private London clubs, Viz, Alice in Sunderland (Bryan Talbot), Robert Dighton, Tony Blair, Margaret Thatcher and Spitting Image.

Exhibitions feature catalogues, such as Ronald Searle: Graphic Master, which includes essays on Searle's work. Leading cartoonists and filmmakers have produced artworks in homage to Searle and written pieces, including Steve Bell, Roger Law, Mike Leigh, Uli Meyer, Arnold Roth, Martin Rowson, Gerald Scarfe, Posy Simmonds and Ralph Steadman. In September 2023 the Cartoon Museum will host an exhibition celebrating the 30th Anniversary of Aardman Animation's short film The Wrong Trousers.

== Education ==
The museum runs a learning programme for primary and secondary schools in a range of subjects, including art, media, history, English and animation. With workshops for children during half-term and holidays, it also features adult courses in cartooning and graphic novels.

== Awards ==
Every year the trustees of the Cartoon Art Trust host the Cartoon Art Trust Awards, giving a number of awards, including a Lifetime Achievement Award to an artist who has made a significant contribution to British cartooning. Past winners have included Ronald Searle, David Levine, Trog, Fluck and Law, Norman Thelwell, Frank Dickens, David Langdon, Gerald Scarfe, Leo Baxendale and Bill Tidy. The CAT also give the "Pont Award" to a cartoonist whose drawings reflect "The British Character". Past winners include Norman Thelwell, "Mac", Michael Heath, Sue McCartney-Snape and Tony Husband. The Museum also hosts the Young Cartoonist of the Year Award which receives around 1,000 submissions every year.

== See also ==
- British Cartoonists' Association
- Billy Ireland Cartoon Library & Museum
