= Oliver Preston =

British cartoonist (born 1962)

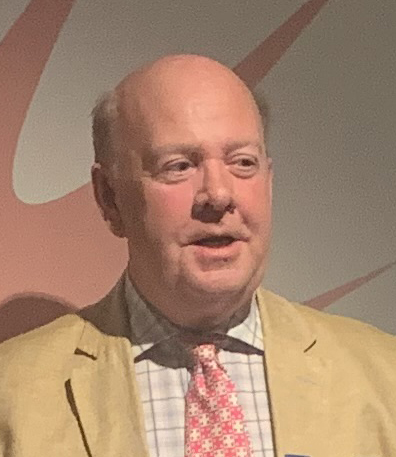
- Oliver Preston at the Cartoon Museum in March 2026
- Born: 21 December 1962 (age 63); London, UK
- Education: Eton College
- Occupations: Cartoonist, publisher Chairman and Co-founder of The Cartoon Museum
- Known for: Beverston Press; The Cartoon Museum
- Website: www.oliverpreston.com

Oliver Preston (born 21 December 1962) is a British cartoonist, publisher, and chairman and co-founder of The Cartoon Museum in London.

== Career ==
Preston worked in the City of London (1984-1995), latterly as a bond salesman at Lehman Brothers, which he left to become a full-time cartoonist. He has had cartoons published in The Spectator, Punch Magazine and The Times and he developed and drew the comic strip, "Marvin Marmite" an advertorial for The Beano and The Dandy. He drew regularly for The Guardian Education supplement, The Polo Magazine and Cotswold Life. He was the regular cartoonist for The Field Magazine from 1996 - 2019. Since December 2019 he has drawn weekly cartoons for Country Life Magazine. His cartoons are in club collections including Annabel's, Boodles and George and are included in The Cartoon Museum collection. He held his first one-man show of his cartoons at The Addison Ross Gallery, SW1 in 1990, and has held exhibitions at The Fine Art Society, Bond Street, London in 1999 and The Mall Galleries, London SW1 in 2014 and 2016. From 2007 to present he has exhibited his skiing cartoons at the Gstaad Palace Hotel in Switzerland.

In 2005 Preston established Beverston Press to publish and distribute his greeting cards, books and limited edition prints. Beverston Press has published 8 books of collected cartoons by Oliver Preston, and he has illustrated a further 12 books with other authors.

== Personal life ==
Preston was born in London and brought up near Tetbury, Gloucestershire. He was educated at Wellesley House and Eton College. He read Geography at Exeter University. Preston lives with his wife and two children near Tetbury in Gloucestershire, England, where they also run a working arable farm.

== The Cartoon Museum ==
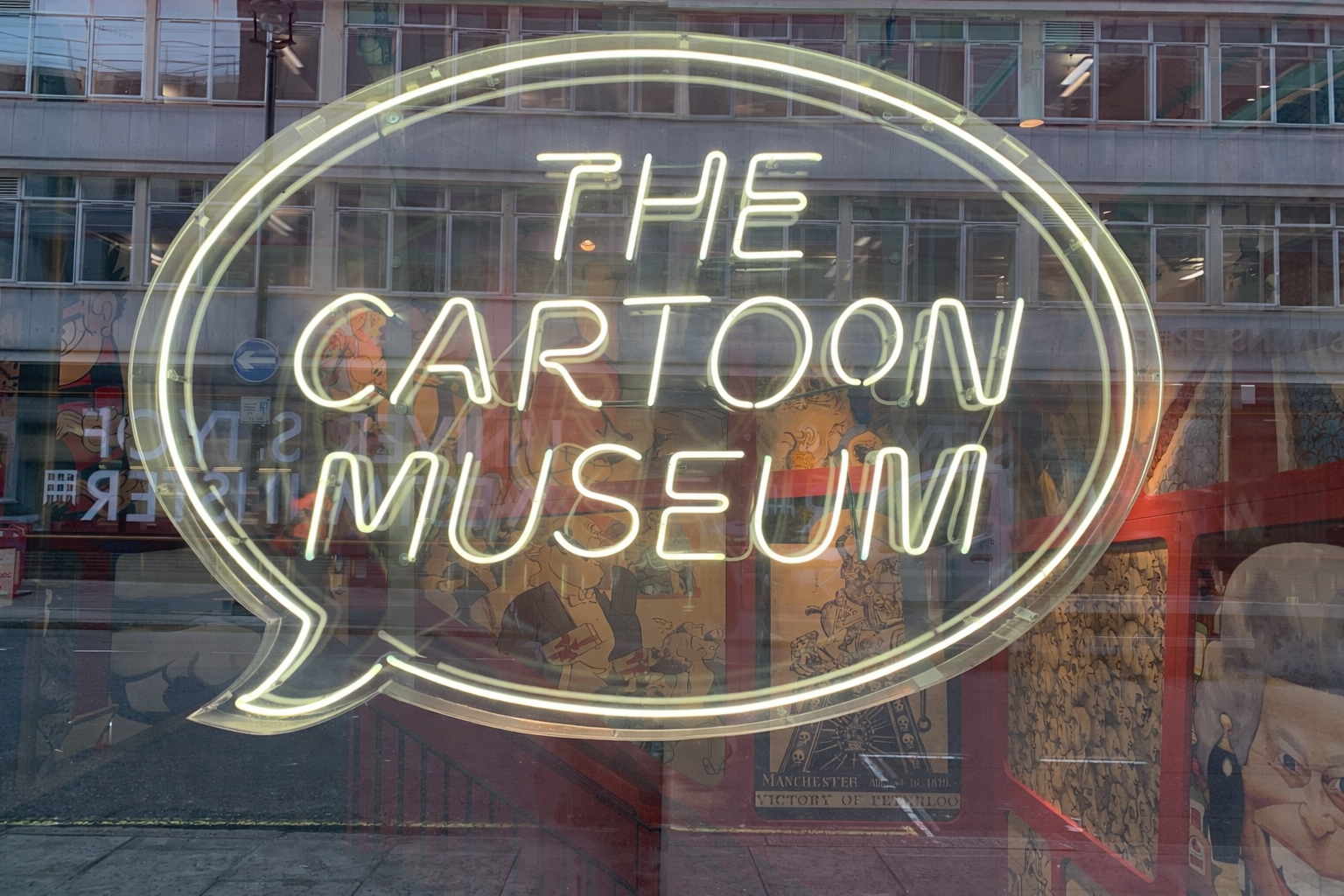
Cartoon Museum, Wells St

Preston was appointed to the appeal committee of The Cartoon Art Trust in 1990 and became a trustee in 1992. He was appointed chairman of the board of trustees in 2001. In 1995 he set up The Cartoon Art Trust Awards, held annually, recognising British Cartoonists in the categories of Strip, Joke, Caricature, Political, and Pocket Cartooning, drawing the British character (Pont Award) and the "CAT Lifetime Achievement Award". Since 2003 he has hosted the awards at The Mall Galleries. Since 2003 he has been one of the judges of the British Cartoonists' Association Young Cartoonist of the Year Competition, presented at The Cartoon Art Trust Awards in the categories of U18 and U30.

In 2005 Preston worked with trustees and vice chair, Lord Baker of Dorking, to raise the funds to open a new London Cartoon Museum. He welcomed Prince Philip, Duke of Edinburgh, Patron of The Cartoon Art Trust who officially opened the new Cartoon Museum at 35 Little Russell Street, in Bloomsbury, London on 23 February 2006. In 2014 the museum received 31,000 visitors annually and educated 1,700 children and adults through its Learning Programmes.

In 2018 Preston and trustees obtained new premises for the museum at 63 Wells Street, London W1 (Fitzrovia) and raised £1.08 million to fund the fitting out of the new premises which were designed by architect Sam Jacob. The museum reopened in July 2019.

== Bibliography ==
- Harpers and Queen Party Handbook (2000) (written by Camilla Cecil)
- Liquid Limericks (2001) (written by Alastair Sampson)
- Larder Limericks (2004) (written by Alastair Sampson)
- Shall we Join the Men ? (2005)
- Modern Cautionary Verses (2006) (written by Charlie Ottley)
- Hitting the Slopes (2008)
- How to be Asked Again (2009) (written by Rosie Nickerson)
- Out of Town (2010)
- Out for a Duck (2010) (written by Ian Valentine)
- Fondue and Furs (2011)
- Another Log on the Fire (2011)
- Real Men Drink Port (2011) (written by Ben Howkins)
- Rich Pickings (2013)
- The Imperfect Shot (2015) (written by Jeremy Hobson)
- "Lively Limericks" (2015) (Collected by Patrick Holden)
- "Raise Your Game" (2016) (written by Ian Valentine)
- “ The Long Weekend” (2017)
- “Off Piste” (2017)
- “The Dictionary of Posh” (2019) (written by Hugh Kellett)
- “Unlimited Overs” (2019) (written by Roger Morgan-Grenville)

_{Source:}
