= Gag cartoon =

Single-panel cartoon

A gag cartoon (also panel cartoon, single-panel cartoon, or gag panel) is most often a single-panel cartoon, usually including a caption beneath the drawing. In some cases, dialogue may appear in speech balloons, following the common convention of comic strips. A pantomime cartoon carries no caption (see also: pantomime comics).

As the name implies—"gag" being a show business term for a comedic idea—these cartoons are most often intended to provoke laughter. Popular magazines that have featured gag cartoons include Punch, The New Yorker and Playboy. Some publications, such as Humorama, have used cartoons as the main focus of the magazine, rather than articles and fiction.

== Captions ==
Captions are usually concise, to fit on a single line. Gag cartoons of the 1930s and earlier occasionally had lengthy captions, sometimes featuring dialogue between two characters depicted in the drawing; over time, cartoon captions became shorter.

== Media ==
In the mid-1950s, gag cartoonists found a new market with the introduction of highly popular studio cards in college bookstores. Single-panel cartoons have been published on various products, such as coffee mugs and cocktail napkins.

Traditionally, newspapers and magazines printed cartoons in black and white, but this changed in the 1950s when Playboy began to feature full-page, full-color cartoons in every issue.

There are numerous collections of cartoons in both paperback and hardcover, notably The New Yorker collections. From 1942 to 1971, the cartoonist-novelist Lawrence Lariar edited the annual Best Cartoons of the Year collections.

== Notable gag cartoons ==
A well-known 1928 cartoon in The New Yorker, drawn by Carl Rose and captioned by E. B. White, shows a mother trying to convince her young daughter to finish her meal. "It's broccoli, dear." "I say it's spinach and I say the hell with it", which have created an idiom in English language.

Cartoonist Charles Addams drew his first gag cartoon for The New Yorker in 1932, and in 1937 started inventing a set of macabre characters which came to be known as The Addams Family. This was turned into a 1960s television series which ran for two years, in an agreement in which Addams gave his characters names and more developed characteristics.

Cartoonist Ted Key created a gag panel about a bossy maid named Hazel for The Saturday Evening Post in 1943. This also was made into a 1960s television series, which ran for five years.

== Notable gag cartoonists ==
- Charles Addams
- Peter Arno
- George Booth
- Roz Chast
- George Clark
- Sam Cobean
- George Gately
- Sam Gross
- Ted Key
- Gary Larson
- R. K. Laxman
- George Lichty
- Virgil Partch (a.k.a. VIP)
- Dan Piraro
- George Price
- Ronald Searle
- Jean-Jacques Sempé
- James Thurber
- Marvin Townsend
- Kim Warp
- Gluyas Williams
- Gahan Wilson
- Tom Wilson

== Popular setups ==
There are some well-established setups used regularly in gag cartoons.

- Desert island jokes: marooned on a desert island. In earlier cartoons the island was quite large, with a shipwreck shown, to deliver the setup of the narrative. Eventually the setup has shrunk to an iconic image of a sand heap with a palm in the middle.
- Talking animals
- Therapist's couch

== See also ==
- Daily strip
- Editorial cartoon
- Gag-a-day
- Humor comics
- List of cartoonists
