= I say it's spinach =

Twentieth-century American idiom

I say it's spinach (sometimes given in full as I say it's spinach and I say the hell with it or further abbreviated to just spinach) is a 20th-century American idiom with the approximate meaning of "nonsense" or "rubbish". It is usually spoken or written as an anapodoton, with only the first part of the complete phrase ("I say it's spinach") given to imply the second part, which is what is actually meant: "I say the hell with it."

== Rose and White's cartoon ==
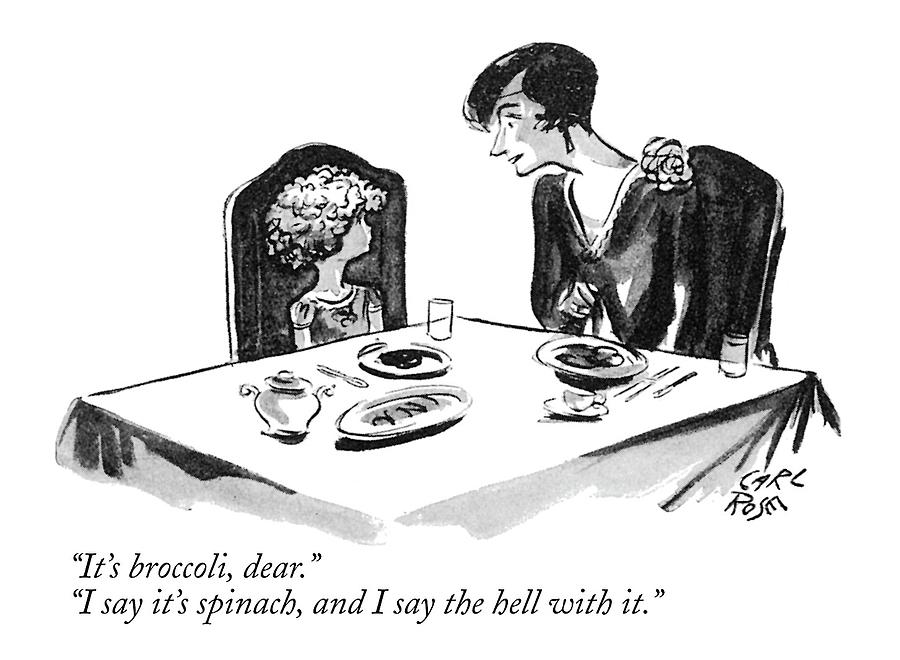
Original cartoon from The New Yorker

The phrase originated as the caption of a gag cartoon published in The New Yorker on December 8, 1928. Drawn by Carl Rose and captioned by E. B. White, the cartoon shows a mother at table trying to convince her young daughter to eat her vegetable, the dialogue being

Mother: "It's broccoli, dear."
Daughter: "I say it's spinach, and I say the hell with it."

(Broccoli was a relative novelty at that time, just then being widely introduced by Italian immigrant growers to the tables of East Coast cities.)

== Catching on in the 1930s ==
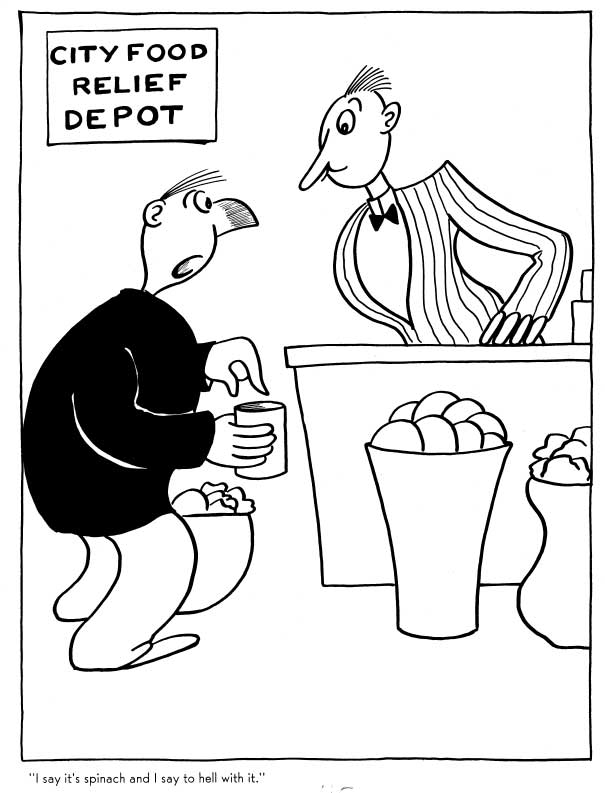
The line was reused (with slight alteration) by writer David Plotkin and artist Otto Soglow in this cartoon for the 1934 book Wasn't the Depression Terrible?

What White called "the spinach joke" quickly became one of the New Yorker cartoon captions to enter the vernacular (later examples include Peter Arno's "Back to the drawing board!" and Peter Steiner's "On the Internet, nobody knows you're a dog"), becoming a bon mot of the 1930s, with continued, though diminishing, use into the early 21st century. For instance, Alexander Woollcott in his 1934 collection While Rome Burns: "This eruption of reticence... will, I am sure, be described by certain temperaments as an exercise in good taste. I do not myself so regard it. I say it's spinach.") At the first awards ceremony of the New York Drama Critics' Circle in 1936, Percy Hammond of the New York Herald Tribune gave a speech dissenting from the choice of Maxwell Anderson's Winterset as the Best Play winner, calling it "spinach, and I say to hell with it." Elizabeth Hawes titled her 1938 autobiographical critique and exposé of the fashion industry Fashion is Spinach and made her meaning clear by reproducing Rose and White's cartoon following the title page. S. J. Perelman titled a 1944 story for the Saturday Evening Post "Dental or Mental, I Say It's Spinach".

== Berlin's song ==
Irving Berlin's song "I Say It's Spinach (And the Hell with It)", which appeared in the 1932 musical Face the Music, used the full phrase: "Long as I'm yours, long as you're mine/Long as there's love and a moon to shine/I say it's spinach and the hell with it/The hell with it, that's all!".

== Gammon and spinach ==
In Britain in the 19th century, "spinach" also meant "nonsense". This is presumably a coincidence, with an entirely different origin. Dickens uses the phrase "gammon and spinach" in this sense with Miss Mowcher in David Copperfield (published in 1849) saying "What a world of gammon and spinnage it is though, ain't it!" ("spinnage" being a now-obsolete variant of "spinach"). The same phrase, although with unclear meaning, is also seen in the nursery rhyme "A Frog He Would A-Wooing Go" ("With a rowley, powley, gammon and spinach/heigh ho! says Anthony Rowley"). The 1989 second edition of the Oxford English Dictionary lists these two close senses as letters below the same number in the entry for "spinach". Cassell's Dictionary of Slang gives just the American sense (but listed as extant 1900–1950) while, conversely, Partridge gives only the British, perhaps echoing the first edition of the Oxford English Dictionary which also does so.

== 2015 Hafeez cartoon ==
In its August 6, 2015 issue, The New Yorker published a cartoon by Kaamran Hafeez that called back to the 87-year-old cartoon. A young girl and her mother are in a therapist's office, with the caption, "You said, and I quote, 'I say it's spinach and I say the hell with it.' Why don't we start there?"
