= Botnik Studios =

- Website type: Entertainment website
- Website: www.botnik.org
- Launched: 2016; 10 years ago

Botnik Studios is an entertainment group developed to exhibit work created by the Botnik community, a writer's society of artists and developers who incorporate technology in the creation of comedy. This content is published on the Botnik homepage.

== Features ==
Botnik's main tool is a predictive text keyboard, similar to one used by a smartphone. The program, called Voicebox, offers several choices of words to type based on what the program predicts is likely to follow words that have already been entered. Users can upload their own training data or select from a list of preloaded training data provided by Botnik, including pancake recipes, the Communist Manifesto, and the narration from all seven Harry Potter novels. The resulting text created by users has an uncanny quality that many readers find amusing.

== History ==
In 2016, Jamie Brew, a former writer for The Onion and then head writer at ClickHole, developed a predictive text keyboard inspired by the iPhone's predictive keyboard. He was soon introduced to Bob Mankoff, a humor editor at Esquire and former cartoon editor of The New Yorker, by Mankoff's assistant at The New Yorker. Brew and Mankoff formed the company in October 2016, and were later joined by lead scientist Elle O'Brien in August 2017. Brew and O'Brien are based in Seattle, Washington, and Mankoff works in New York with creative director Joseph Parker.

In July 2017, Botnik received a grant from the Amazon/Techstars Accelerator Program thanks to being a startup whose technology could realistically improve Amazon's smart speaker assistant, Alexa. In 2018, Botnik began referring to themselves as an open community, meaning users can download the predictive keypad, experiment with the tool, and share their outcomes on the community page of the Botnik website.

Botnik became better known when Zach Braff, the actor who plays J.D. on the medical comedy series Scrubs, shared a recording of himself reading a Scrubs-style monologue written by the Botnik system in December 2017.

Botnik's Harry Potter and the Portrait of What Looked Like a Large Pile of Ash was ranked number four in the list of ten best internet moments in 2017 by The Guardian.
