= Alan Dunn =

Alan Dunn may refer to:

- Alan Dunn (baseball)
- Alan Dunn (cartoonist)

== See also ==
- Alan Dunne, Irish footballer
