= Something to Live For (film) =

1952 film by George Stevens

- Original poster for the French release
- Directed by: George Stevens
- Screenplay by: Dwight Taylor
- Produced by: George Stevens
- Starring: Joan Fontaine; Ray Milland; Teresa Wright; Richard Derr; Douglas Dick
- Cinematography: George Barnes
- Edited by: William Hornbeck
- Music by: Victor Young
- Production company: Paramount Pictures
- Distributed by: Paramount Pictures
- Release date: March 7, 1952
- Running time: 89 minutes
- Country: United States
- Language: English

Something to Live For is a 1952 American drama film starring Joan Fontaine, Ray Milland, and Teresa Wright, directed by George Stevens, and released by Paramount Pictures. The screenplay by Dwight Taylor was the first to focus on the Alcoholics Anonymous program as a means of overcoming an addiction to liquor.

== Plot ==
Alan Miller, a recovering alcoholic, arrives at a Times Square hotel, and is alerted to help Jenny Carey, an actress with an increasing dependence on alcohol. He arrives at her hotel room, and offers for her to join Alcoholics Anonymous, though she turns down his help. He interests her in a cocktail, and the two have dinner together. While dining, Jenny realizes that she has forgotten another day of rehearsals but cannot explain why she drinks. Alan sends Jenny back to her apartment, and returns home to his wife Edna.

The next morning, Alan tells his wife about Jenny, to which Edna worries about his possible relapse. He goes to his workplace at an advertising agency, where his proposed ad campaign has been turned down in favor of his colleague J. B. Crawley. Meanwhile, Jenny goes to the theatre for rehearsals but learns she has been recast. She returns to her apartment and unsuccessfully attempts to contact Alan. While out to lunch, Alan arrives at a bar and tries to call Jenny. Under temptation, Alan orders a cocktail, and shortly after Jenny arrives, she walks out when the bartender serves Alan his drink.

Alan follows Jenny outside and the two converse inside an empty theatre. There, Alan states he is married while Jenny reveals she has been romantically involved with theatre director Tony Collins, who helped jumpstart her acting career. Alan returns to his agency office, where Jenny calls stating she has given a new acting job. They reunite in an Egyptian room at the museum, where Alan and Jenny recite lines from Jenny's new play The Egyptians. He tries to interest Jenny with dinner together until Alan's son arrives unexpectedly during a school trip.

Later that night, during dinner, Alan excuses his presence at the museum. Afterwards, Edna discloses she is pregnant and finds pages of Jenny's play on the night stand, which Alan falsely states are for an ad campaign. Sometime later, Alan's employer Baker invites them to a party, which Jenny and Tony also attend. While eating, Tony converses about Jenny's acting career, which upsets her and she leaves. She returns to her apartment despondent, and Billy, an elevator hop, answers Alan's phone call informing him that Jenny has not been drinking.

The next morning, Alan learns that Jenny is leaving for Boston for a theatre tryout. He confronts her at the Pennsylvania Station where they part ways. At a Christmas office party, Alan is unable to celebrate as he thinks about Jenny. He returns home and Edna tries to console Alan, stating she has purchased tickets to Jenny's play. He soon receives a call from Billy stating Jenny has locked herself in her room. Alan rushes to the hotel and discovers Jenny has passed out on the bed. Alan kisses her, and Jenny wakes up. He gives her words of encouragement and puts her in a cold shower.

At the theatre, Alan and Edna attend the play. Edna remembers the lines from the play, and tells Alan she had wanted to be an actress but decided to be a wife and mother instead.

== Cast ==
- Joan Fontaine as Jenny Carey
- Ray Milland as Alan Miller
- Teresa Wright as Edna Miller
- Richard Derr as Tony Collins
- Douglas Dick as Baker
- Herbert Heyes as J. B. Crawley
- Harry Bellaver as Billy, Elevator Operator
- Paul Valentine as Albert Forest
- Mari Blanchard as Hat Check Girl

== Production notes ==
Screenwriter Dwight Taylor based the character of Jenny on his mother, stage actress Laurette Taylor, whose struggle with alcoholism kept her from acting for years at a time. She was a longtime friend of director/producer George Stevens' uncle, theatre critic Ashton Stevens.

At the film's San Francisco premiere, Joan Fontaine told reporters this was one of her more difficult roles "partly because I've never been drunk." In order to achieve a convincing performance, she said "I talked to members of Alcoholics Anonymous and watched my friends at cocktail parties."

== Reception ==
Bosley Crowther of The New York Times commented: "Mr. Stevens' production and the direction he has given this film...are as sleek and professionally efficient as any you are going to see around. But, oh, that script by Dwight Taylor! It is a fearsomely rigged and foolish thing, planted with fatuous situations that even Mr. Stevens can't disguise. And how that long arm of coincidence keeps batting you in the face! At first it is simply embarrassing. Then it is vexingly absurd."

William Brogdon of Variety wrote: "George Stevens' production and direction put the dramatic devices together with his usual meticulous touch, dealing as realistically as possible with what is, basically a soap-opera formula along tearjerker lines. Dwight Taylor's writing supplies freshness in handling as an added indication of the taste with which the subject has been approached." Harrison's Reports felt Fontaine, Milland, and Wright "contribute sensitive performances" but felt the "story never seems to strike a realistic note and the situations are contrived and mechanical. Consequently, it rarely succeeds in affecting one's emotions." John McCarten of The New Yorker concluded: "As the principals, Mr. Milland and Miss Fontaine seemed, in the circumstances, all right to me, and as Mr. Milland's long-suffering wife, Teresa Wright looked long-suffering."

Time magazine noted: "On sober analysis, Dwight Taylor's screenplay, with its rich lather of plot manipulation and sentimentality, verges on soap opera. But George Stevens' direction is clean and uncluttered. Stevens has a camera magic that evokes a world of romantic illusion: the frustrated lovers caught up in a slow mire of overlapping dissolves, of magnificent closeups, of telephones ringing unanswered, of rainswept city streets."
