= The Boozer Challenge =

1987 novel by Charles Gill

- Author: Charles Gill
- Language: English
- Genre: Fiction
- Publisher: Dutton
- Publication date: 1987
- Publication place: United States
- Pages: 288
- ISBN: 978-0-14-011581-9

The Boozer Challenge is a fiction book by author Charles Gill, son of famed New Yorker writer Brendan Gill, and brother of Michael Gates Gill, who wrote How Starbucks Saved My Life.

The Boozer Challenge was published in 1987, by Dutton.

The story is about four spoiled twenty-something children who are challenged by their billionaire father to earn $100,000 in one year in order to inherit his beautiful Hudson River estate.
