= The Red Badge of Courage (1951 film) =

1951 film

- Theatrical release poster
- Directed by: John Huston
- Screenplay by: John Huston; Albert Band
- Based on: The Red Badge of Courage; 1895 novel by Stephen Crane
- Produced by: Gottfried Reinhardt; Dore Schary
- Starring: Audie Murphy; Bill Mauldin; Andy Devine; Robert Easton; Douglas Dick; Tim Durant
- Narrated by: James Whitmore
- Cinematography: Harold Rosson
- Edited by: Ben Lewis
- Music by: Bronislau Kaper
- Production company: Metro-Goldwyn-Mayer
- Distributed by: Loew's Inc.
- Release date: October 18, 1951 (New York)
- Running time: 120 min (lost original version); 69 min (edited and current version)
- Country: United States
- Language: English
- Budget: $1,673,000
- Box office: $1,080,000

The Red Badge of Courage is a 1951 Metro-Goldwyn-Mayer American war film directed by John Huston and produced by Gottfried Reinhardt, with Dore Schary as executive producer. Huston wrote the screenplay, adapted by Albert Band from Stephen Crane's 1895 novel of the same name. The film's cinematographer was Harold Rosson, and the music score was composed by Bronislau Kaper. The production of the film is the subject of Lillian Ross's 1952 book Picture, originally published as a series in The New Yorker.

The American Civil War film is a sparse but faithful retelling of the story and incorporates the book's narration. The film stars former World War II hero Audie Murphy, Bill Mauldin, Andy Devine, Arthur Hunnicutt, and Royal Dano.

== Plot ==
In 1862, the 304th New York Infantry, a regiment of the Union Army, is encamped near the Rappahannock River in Virginia. Orders direct the 304th to move upriver and engage a large Confederate force. Private Henry Fleming tells his comrades that he is not afraid of death. While on sentry duty, Henry exchanges words with an unseen Confederate soldier stationed across the river, who tells him to beware of the "red badge", a term for a battle wound.

As the hour of battle approaches, Henry becomes increasingly pensive. His friend Tom Wilson tells him to give his watch to his parents if he is killed. During the battle, Henry is overcome with fear and deserts. He learns that his outfit won the battle, but he fears derision if he returns. Henry sees his wounded comrades and wishes that he also wore a "red badge of courage". He returns to the regiment as they march.

Henry's comrade Jim Conklin has become delusional from his injuries and dies from blood loss. Henry becomes separated from his unit when they encounter a Union column attempting a hasty, disorganized retreat. A soldier becomes panic-stricken when Henry tries to calm him and strikes him in the head with the stock of his rifle. Regaining consciousness, Henry meets a fellow soldier, who escorts him back to the 304th. Henry lies to Tom that his head injury was incurred in battle, and that their friend Jim is dead. Tom tells Henry that his absence was not noticed among the heavy casualties suffered. Confident in his lie, Henry is able to talk with the rest of his unit as if he, too, fought in the battle.

The 304th is sent back into battle to support a Union offensive. This time, Henry wildly charges toward the enemy with passion until he is ordered back into ranks. Henry and Tom fetch water at a creek and overhear an unnamed general plotting to sacrifice the 304th in a suicide attack. They report the news back to their regiment, but the soldiers choose to fight, regardless of the information. As men die around him, Henry sees the color sergeant shot, takes the flag, and tries to rally his comrades. Henry meets the Confederate flagbearer, who falls dead. Henry briefly holds both flags as the 304th secures the defeated rebels.

A soldier tells Henry and the regiment that he had overheard their commanding officers lauding Henry's bravery. Henry admits to Tom that he had deserted the first battle and that his shame compelled him to return. Tom admits that he also deserted, but he was caught and forced back into battle. The 304th continues its march as Henry contemplates the hope of a peaceful future.

== Cast ==
- Audie Murphy as Henry Fleming
- Bill Mauldin as Tom Wilson
- Douglas Dick as The Lieutenant
- Royal Dano as The Tattered Man
- John Dierkes as Jim Conklin
- Arthur Hunnicutt as Bill Porter
- Tim Durant as The General
- Andy Devine as The Cheery Soldier
- Robert Easton as Thompson
- Whit Bissell as Wounded Officer (uncredited)
- John Huston as Grizzled Union Veteran (uncredited)
- William Phipps as Union Soldier (uncredited)
- William Schallert as Union Soldier (uncredited)
- James Whitmore as Narrator (voice, uncredited)

== Production ==
Director John Huston employed unusual compositions and camera angles drawn from film noir to create an alienating battlefield environment.

Huston considered the original two-hour cut of the film to be the best that he had ever directed. However, following poor audience response to West Coast audience screenings, Metro-Goldwyn-Mayer (MGM) postponed the film's release and cut its length to 70 minutes. Huston and star Murphy unsuccessfully tried to purchase the film so that it could be restored to its original length. Huston, though, was preoccupied with the pre-production of his next film, The African Queen. The film was released for distribution to arthouse theaters with a special booking and advertising policy, a strategy that was rare for the major studios.

MGM later claimed that the excised footage had been destroyed, probably in the 1965 MGM vault fire. In 1975, MGM asked Huston whether he possessed an original cut, because the studio wanted to re-release it. Huston informed the studio that he did not have the full cut and that it did not exist. He instructed his agent, Paul Kohner, to include in all his future contracts a stipulation that Huston receive a 16 mm print of the first cut of any film that he directed.

Of the stars who appear in the film, three served in World War II: Bill Mauldin, the editorial cartoonist whose work was compiled in the bestselling book Up Front; Audie Murphy, who served with the U.S. Army in Europe; and narrator James Whitmore, who served in the U.S. Marine Corps.

Much of the history of the production of the film is documented in Lillian Ross' critically acclaimed book Picture.

== Reception ==
In a contemporary review for The New York Times, critic Bosley Crowther called the film "a major achievement that should command admiration for years and years" and wrote:

Don't expect too much from it in the way of emotional punch—at least, not as much as is compacted in Mr. Crane's thin little book. For, of course, Mr. Crane was conveying the reactions of his hero to war in almost stream-of-consciousness descriptions, which is a technique that works best with words. When it is a matter of telling precisely how a young soldier feels at a time, for instance, when awaiting an enemy attack or when wandering behind the lines after lamming, it is easier to do so with words than with a camera going around with the soldier and frequently looking at his face. This is a technical problem Mr. Huston has not been able to lick, even with his sensitive direction, in view of his sticking to the book. ... Mr. Huston has captured and etched vividly most of the major encounters of the hero that Mr. Crane described—the heartbreaking death of the Tall Soldier, the stunning blow on the head—all but the shocking discovery of the rotting corpse in the woods.

According to MGM records, the film earned $789,000 in the U.S. and Canada and $291,000 in other countries, resulting in a loss of $1,018,000. It ranked among the studio's least successful films of the year, although it did not lose as much money as did Calling Bulldog Drummond, Mr. Imperium or Inside Straight. On the review aggregator website Rotten Tomatoes, 86% of 14 critics' reviews are positive.

Stanley Kauffmann described The Red Badge of Courage as an "ambitious failure".

== Comic-book adaptation ==
- Fawcett Motion Picture Comics #105 (July 1951)

== See also ==
- List of films cut over the director's opposition
- List of incomplete or partially lost films
