= Mary Petty =

American cartoonist

- Detail of Mary Petty's September 24, 1955 The New Yorker cover depicting Mrs. Peabody's maid, "Fay"; both were the primary characters in Petty's popular 40-cover Peabody Family series that ran for 35 years
- Born: April 29, 1900; Hampton, New Jersey, U.S.
- Died: 6 March 1976 (aged 75); Paramus, New Jersey, U.S.
- Known for: Illustrator

Mary Petty (April 29, 1899 – March 6, 1976) was an illustrator of books and magazines best remembered for a series of covers published by The New Yorker that feature a family she invented and named, "Peabody", along with their household servants.

== Early life ==
Mary Petty was born in Hampton, New Jersey, to Florence Servis and Robert Davison Petty. Her mother was a schoolteacher and her father was a law professor at the New York Law School and they lived in Manhattan.

Petty was a 1922 graduate of the Horace Mann School in The Bronx. She did not study art formally, but taught herself to draw.

== Artistic career ==
Around 1925, Petty met cartoonist Alan Dunn and he encouraged her to sell her work. His work was being published by The New Yorker, a magazine that was only in its second year of publication. On October 22, 1927, her first published drawing appeared in the magazine. She became "one of a group of women—Helen E. Hokinson, Edna Eicke, Ilonka Karasz, Barbara Shermund, among them—who contributed well-known, well-loved drawings and paintings to a magazine that was then largely dominated by men". New Yorker publisher Harold Ross gave Petty's cartoons his top grade of "AAA". She and Dunn married in December 1927.

Petty's style was characterized by her "gentle satirization of New York City's Victorian era society". She portrayed upper-class families in scenes of wealth and privilege. While somewhat satirical, her drawings also were affectionate. One imaginary family recurred in her drawings, to which she assigned the name, "Peabody".

James Thurber wrote that Petty was a naturally reticent person, and while her work began appearing in the lauded new magazine, Petty did not go to The New Yorker offices for some time and thus "for a long time nothing at all was known about her—except that she regularly submitted a new and distinctive kind of drawing". Even after becoming a part of the office scene, few knew her well. Thurber said all he knew of her background was that she "was born in a brownstone house on West End Avenue. Her father was a professor. She did not have a particularly happy childhood. That's all, brother." Of note is that Petty was not born in Manhattan.

Petty contributed to the New Yorker for thirty-nine years, publishing 273 drawings and 38 covers. Her last New Yorker cover was published on March 19, 1966. The cover showed elderly "Mrs. Peabody" pulling on a broken calling cord. After two further covers were rejected by the magazine, Petty in a tiff gave up illustrating. Alan Dunn later wrote that Petty, "ignored all comment, fought off all publicity and went her own headstrong way, drawing never to please critics or get ahead, but solely from the love of her subject matter. Her greatest mistake was to abandon her career..." Roz Chast, a later New Yorker cartoonist, has expressed admiration for Petty.

Petty illustrated several books, including one of her New Yorker cartoons. The book was published in 1945. Petty rarely took ideas from outside sources (only twice, according to Thurber).

== Personal life ==
On December 8, 1927, Petty married the cartoonist Alan Dunn (1900–1974) who had encouraged her to sell her illustrations professionally. He had a long relationship with the New Yorker as well. They lived in and created their work in a small apartment at 12 East Eighty-eighth Street in Manhattan. They had no children.

== Injury and death ==
Petty was assaulted and beaten on Ward's Island by a mugger on December 1, 1971, and was only found in a hospital by Dunn three days after the incident.

Permanently brain damaged she never fully recovered from the assault and spent the rest of her life in a nursing home, dying at the Pine Rest Nursing Home in Paramus, New Jersey on March 6, 1976.
