= Helen E. Hokinson =

American cartoonist

Helen Hokinson
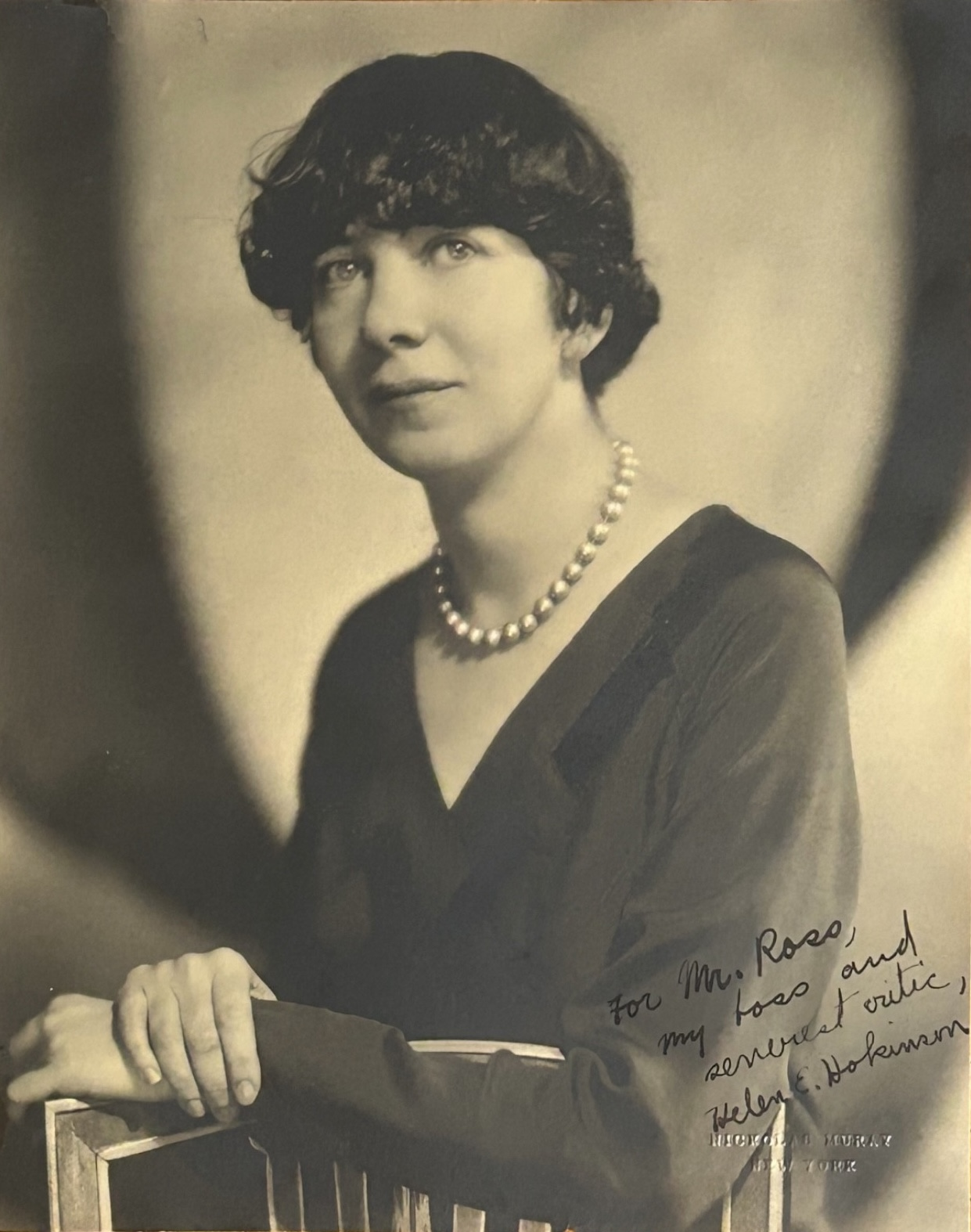
- Muray photo inscribed to Harold Ross
- Born: Helen Elna Hokinson; June 29, 1893; Mendota, IL, U.S.
- Died: November 1, 1949 (aged 56); Arlington County, Virginia, U.S.

Helen Elna Hokinson (June 29, 1893 – November 1, 1949) was an American cartoonist and a staff artist for The New Yorker. Over a 20-year span, she contributed 68 covers and more than 1,800 cartoons to The New Yorker.

== Life and career ==
Hokinson was born in Mendota, Illinois, the daughter of Adolph Hokinson, a farm machinery salesman, and Mary Hokinson, the daughter of Phineas Wilcox, the "Carpenter Orator". She studied at the Academy of Fine Arts (now known as the School of the Art Institute of Chicago), and worked as a freelance fashion illustrator in Chicago for department stores such as Marshall Field's.

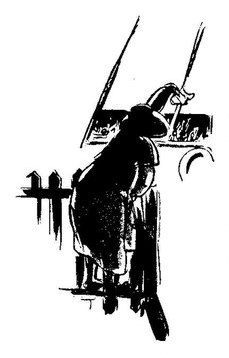
Hokinson's debut cartoon for The New Yorker, July 4, 1925, page 1

In 1920, Hokinson moved to New York City to work as a fashion illustrator and study at the School of Fine and Applied Arts (now Parsons School of Design). Encouraged by an instructor she began submitting comic drawings to magazines, and became one of the first cartoonists to be published in The New Yorker, appearing in the magazine for the first time in the July 4, 1925 issue. She specialized in wealthy, plump, and ditsy society women and their foibles, referring to them as 'My Best Girls', those dowager denizens of woman's clubs, beauty parlors, art galleries, summer resorts and Lane Bryant; they were also popularly known as “Hokinson Women”. According to James Thurber and Brendan Gill, Hokinson relied on the magazine's staff writers to provide captions for her cartoons, a common practice at The New Yorker in the Harold Ross era, until entering into a professional partnership with James Reid Parker in 1931. Hokinson and Parker also provided a monthly cartoon, "The Dear Man," for the Ladies' Home Journal as well as occasional cartoons for advertising campaigns and other magazines.

Hokinson died in the Eastern Airlines Flight 537 mid-air collision at Washington National Airport on November 1, 1949, en route to an appearance at the opening of a Community Chest Drive in DC. She left dozens of cartoons, many of which were published by The New Yorker in subsequent months.

== Books ==
In addition to her own cartoon collections, she also illustrated books by others. Her estate published three volumes of her cartoons during the 1950s.

== Awards ==
Inducted into the Society of Illustrator's Hall of Fame, September 9, 2023.

== Bibliography ==
Works by Helen Hokinson

- So You're Going to Buy a Book! Minton, Balch & Co. 1931
- My Best Girls E. P. Dutton 1941
- When Were You Built? E. P. Dutton & Co. 1948
- The Ladies, God Bless 'em (memoir by James Reid Parker) E. P. Dutton & Co. 1950
- There are Ladies Present E. P. Dutton & Co. 1952
- The Hokinson Festival E. P. Dutton & Co. 1956

Illustrated by Helen Hokinson

- Edith M. Barber, What Shall I Eat Macmillan 1933
- Margaret Fishback, Safe Conduct: When to Behave—And Why The World Publishing Company 1941
- Laurence McKinney, Garden Clubs & Spades E. P. Dutton & Co. 1941
- Helen Hayes Peffer, Madam Chairman, Members, And Guests Macmillan 1942
- Emily Kimbrough, We Followed Our Hearts to Hollywood Grosset & Dunlap 1943
- Emily Kimbrough, How Dear to My Heart Dodd, Mead & Co. 1944
- Emily Kimbrough, It Gives Me Great Pleasure Dodd, Mead & Co. 1948
- Mannix Walker, Everything Rustles Dodd, Mead & Co. 1945

Publications

- James Thurber, The Years with Ross, Harper Perennial Modern Classics, New Edition, paperback 2001, ISBN 0-06-095971-1.
- Brendan Gill, Here at The New Yorker, Da Capo Press, paperback 1997, ISBN 0-306-80810-2.
