= Eastern Air Lines Flight 537 =

1949 mid-air collision

Accident
- Date: November 1, 1949
- Summary: Mid-air collision
- Site: Alexandria, Virginia, United States; 38°50.1′N 77°02.7′W
- Total fatalities: 55
- Total injuries: 1
- Total survivors: 1

First aircraft
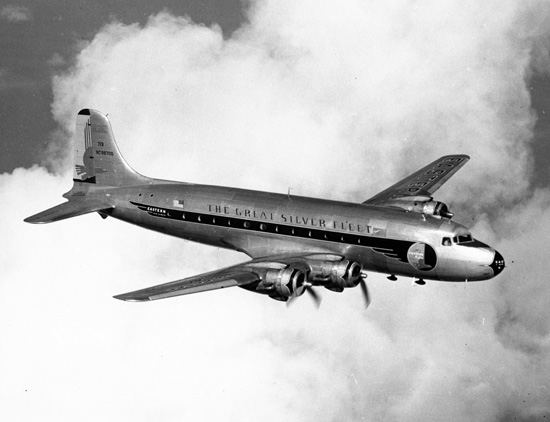
- An Eastern Air Lines Douglas DC-4, similar to the one involved in the crash
- Type: Douglas DC-4
- Operator: Eastern Air Lines
- Call sign: EASTERN 537
- Registration: N88727
- Flight origin: LaGuardia Airport, Queens, New York, U.S.
- Destination: Washington-National Airport, Arlington, Virginia, U.S.
- Occupants: 55
- Passengers: 51
- Crew: 4
- Fatalities: 55
- Survivors: 0

Second aircraft
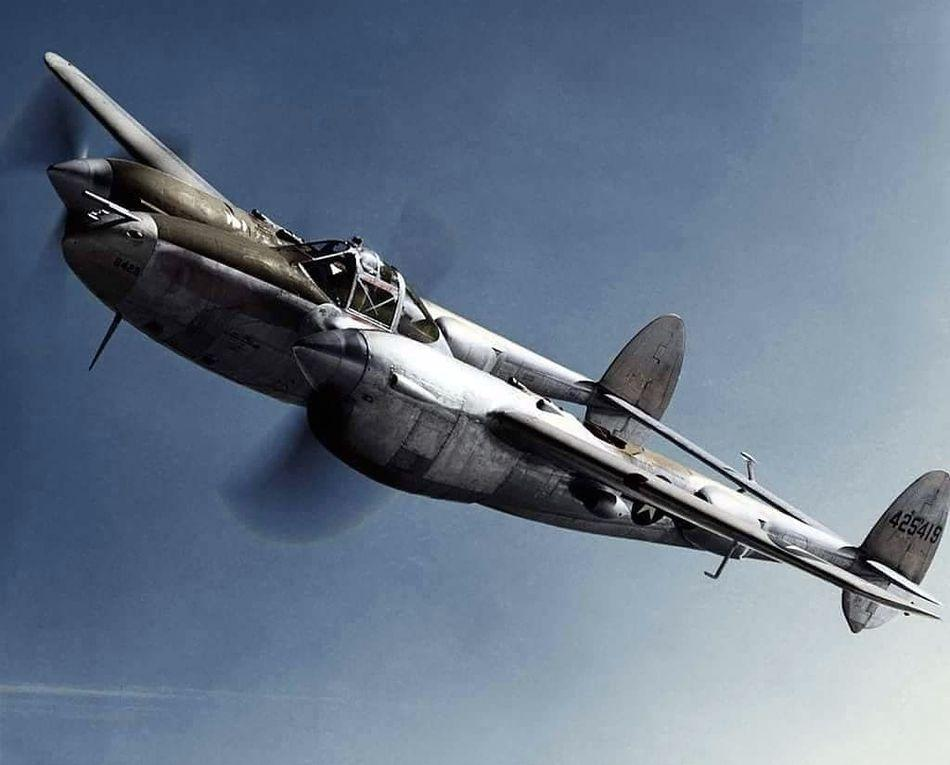
- A Lockheed P-38L Lightning, the type involved in the crash
- Type: Lockheed P-38L Lightning
- Operator: Lockheed
- Call sign: BOLIVIAN 927
- Registration: NX-26927
- Occupants: 1
- Crew: 1
- Fatalities: 0
- Injuries: 1
- Survivors: 1

Eastern Air Lines Flight 537, registration N88727, was a Douglas DC-4 aircraft en route from Boston, Massachusetts, to Washington, D.C., via intermediate points on November 1, 1949. A Lockheed P-38 Lightning, registered NX-26927, was being test-flown for acceptance by the government of Bolivia by Erick Rios Bridoux of the Bolivian Air Force. The two aircraft collided in mid-air at an altitude of 300 feet (91 m) about one-half mile (0.80 km) southwest of the threshold of Runway 3 (present-day Runway 4) at Washington National Airport, killing all 55 aboard the DC-4 and seriously injuring the pilot of the P-38. At the time, it was the deadliest airliner incident in United States history.

== Incident ==
The tower controllers on duty that day at National testified that the P-38 had taken off on Runway 3, turned left north of the Pentagon, circled over Arlington, then returned, requesting permission to land due to engine trouble. The controller cleared the aircraft to join the left traffic pattern, but instead it flew south of the airport and entered a long straight-in approach at the same time Flight 537 was turning onto a shorter final. The controller then called Flight 537 ordering it to turn left; it began the turn, but by then the P-38, being considerably faster than a DC-4 on final, overtook the aircraft a half mile southwest of the threshold of Runway 3.

The DC-4 was cut in half by the left propeller of the P-38 just forward of the trailing edge of the wing. The aft portion of the DC-4 fell to the ground on the west bank of the Potomac River; other pieces were located in Alexandria, Virginia, at the Richmond, Fredericksburg & Potomac Railroad Potomac Yard and on a highway passing near the Yard. The fore portion of the aircraft fell into the river, as did the P-38.

== Investigation ==
Many hours following the collision of an Eastern Air Lines passenger transport and a Bolivian fighter plane, the search went on today under the glare of floodlights for the nine passengers whose bodies had not yet been recovered.

Shocked Members of Congress, stunned by the loss of one of their own number (Republican George J. Bates), promised a complete air safety investigation. The Civil Aeronautics Board said its hearings into the cause of the crash will start in a few days. The airline scheduled a probe of its own, as well. The disaster occurred as the big DC-4 transport headed into the National Airport for a landing shortly before noon, flying at about 300 feet.

Into the traffic pattern, calling for landing instructions, came a P-38 fighter piloted by Bolivia's top airman, Erick Rios Bridoux. Bridoux was testing the twin-engine craft which his government had purchased from the United States. An airport tower operator a bare half-mile away saw the P-38 bear down on the transport. He cried a radio warning to the 28-year-old Bolivian, but the P-38 kept coming. Then the tower frantically signalled the transport. The DC-4 pilot swerved the big ship from its path, but too late. The fighter ripped into it from above and from the side. The airliner split in half. Bodies and wreckage fell into the water and along the bank of the Potomac.

— November 2, 1949, Herald-Press, St. Joseph, Michigan.

Air Force Sergeant Morris J. Flounlacker hauled the weakly treading Bridoux out of the Potomac, just as the wounded pilot lost consciousness. At Alexandria Hospital, doctors found he had a broken back, crushed ribs and serious contusions.

Bridoux contradicted much of the tower controllers' testimony when he spoke to Civil Aeronautics Board (CAB) investigators. He claimed he had taken off from Runway 36, had been in constant contact with the tower, and had been explicitly cleared to land on Runway 3 under the call sign "Bolivian 927". The testimony of both the tower personnel and a military controller listening in on the frequency from his position at Bolling Air Force Base (as well as other discrepancies in the P-38 pilot's testimony) led the CAB to discount Bridoux's version of events. As Bridoux spoke and understood English well, it was thought that language difficulties played no part in the accident. However, Donovan Davis, one of the controllers, said he was cleared to enter the traffic pattern and land on Runway 3.

The CAB determined the primary probable causes of the accident to be the P-38 pilot's decision to land without proper clearance and his failure to exercise normal vigilance in looking out for conflicting traffic. The CAB also found that the tower controllers failed to exercise due vigilance in not notifying the pilots of Flight 537 earlier as to the critical traffic situation developing. However, the report also states that even if Flight 537 had received earlier advice with respect to the P-38's location, it might still have been too late to avoid the accident, as Bridoux's actions left Flight 537 only a few seconds in which to turn.

== Notable people ==
Among the dead on Flight 537 were Massachusetts Congressman George J. Bates, New Yorker cartoonist Helen E. Hokinson, and former Congressman Michael J. Kennedy.

== Aftermath ==
After the crash, families of victims sued Bridoux, Eastern Airlines, and the U.S. government for damages. In 1953 a federal judge decided that a jury should definitely decide who was at fault, regardless of what the CAA report said. Bridoux was judged not to blame - Eastern Airlines was, although the jury acknowledged that Bridoux could have been more careful. Eastern Airlines fought the ruling but finally lost at the Supreme Court in 1957.

== See also ==
- 2025 Potomac River mid-air collision
