= How Starbucks Saved My Life =

2007 memoir by Michael Gates Gill

- Author: Michael Gates Gill
- Language: English
- Genre: Memoir
- Publisher: Gotham Books
- Publication date: September 12, 2007
- Publication place: United States
- Pages: 267
- ISBN: 978-1-59240-286-1

How Starbucks Saved My Life: A Son of Privilege Learns to Live Like Everyone Else is a memoir by Michael Gates Gill that chronicles his journey from a high-level advertising executive with J. Walter Thompson to a barista at Starbucks.The book was optioned by Tom Hanks for a film in 2009; filmmaker Gus Van Sant has also been in talks to direct. Gill is the son of famed The New Yorker writer Brendan Gill, and the brother of Charles Gill, author of the 1987 fiction book The Boozer Challenge.
