= Try and Stop Me (book) =

1944 book by Bennett Cerf

Try and Stop Me (1944) is a best-selling book written by American publisher and writer Bennett Cerf and illustrated by artist Carl Rose. The first of a series of joke books compiled by Cerf, the founder of Random House publishers, Try and Stop Me sold over one million copies in the first two years of publication.

== Overview ==
The book is mainly a compilation of anecdotes, urban legends, jokes, ghost stories, what Cerf calls "shaggy dog stories", and profiles of newsmakers. Celebrities profiled by Cerf include Alexander Woollcott, Gertrude Stein, Robert Emmet Sherwood, Albert Einstein, Herbert Bayard Swope, Dorothy Thompson, Monty Woolley, George Gershwin, and Lucius Beebe.

== Reception ==
While reviewers called the book "a lot of stories some of which practically everybody has read or heard", the book sold well, going into eleven editions with its first publisher, Simon & Schuster, before being released in a condensed form by the magazines Reader's Scope and Omnibook Magazine. A special edition for the armed services was published in 1945; later that same year, it was serialized in the English newspaper the London Evening Chronicle and published in Swedish by publisher A.B. Ljus Forlag. It was later published by Pocket Books in numerous editions and was in print as late as the 1950s.

In 1948, Cerf published a sequel called Shake Well Before Using.

== Trivia ==
A copy of this book can be seen on the bed headboard bookshelf behind Lucille Ball in I Love Lucy episode 14 of season 2, where she has pregnancy cravings and eats pistachio ice cream with hot fudge and sardines. It is visible when Ricky Ricardo/Desi Arnaz serves his TV wife Lucy Ricardo the concoction of the three incongruous ingredients to satisfy her craving. It's also shown on the console table behind the sofa in episode 18 of season 2 in which Lucy develops an Inferiority Complex.
