= Brendan Gill =

American journalist (1914–1997)

- Born: Brendan Gill; October 4, 1914; Hartford, Connecticut, U.S.
- Died: December 27, 1997 (aged 83); Manhattan, New York, U.S.
- Education: Yale University
- Occupations: journalist; critic; writer
- Years active: 1936–1996

Brendan Gill (October 4, 1914 – December 27, 1997) was an American journalist. He wrote for The New Yorker for more than 60 years. Gill also contributed film criticism for Film Comment, wrote about design and architecture for Architectural Digest, and authored fifteen books, including a popular memoir about his time at The New Yorker.

== Biography ==
Born in Hartford, Connecticut, Gill attended the Kingswood-Oxford School (then Kingswood School) before graduating in 1936 from Yale University, where he was a member of Skull and Bones, along with John Hersey. He was a long-time resident of Bronxville, New York, and Norfolk, Connecticut.

In 1936, St. Clair McKelway, an editor at The New Yorker, hired Gill as a writer. One of the publication's few writers to serve under its first four editors, he wrote more than 1,200 pieces for the magazine. These included Profiles, Talk of the Town features, and scores of reviews of Broadway and Off-Broadway theater productions.

In 1949, Gill published a negative critique of John O'Hara's novel A Rage to Live. Gill described his colleague's book as "a formula family novel" turned out by "writers of the third and fourth magnitude in such disheartening abundance" and declared it "a catastrophe" by an author who "plainly intended to write nothing less than a great American novel." One recent critic called Gill's review a "savage attack" and a "cruel hatchet job." "During the preceding two decades O'Hara had been The New Yorker's most prolific contributor of stories" (197 by one count). Thereafter, O'Hara wrote nothing for the magazine for more than a decade.

In his memoir, Gill wrote that James Thurber — whom he described as an "incomparable mischief-maker" — compounded the animosity by falsely informing O'Hara that the review had been written by Wolcott Gibbs. "Thurber was never so happy as when he could cause two old friends to have a falling-out," Gill wrote. "With a single bold lie ... Thurber had ensured that O'Hara would see me as a jackal, willing to let my name be used for nefarious purposes ... and ... that Gibbs and O'Hara would quarrel." At a forum on O'Hara's legacy held in 1996, Gill stood up in the crowd to recall his attack on O'Hara nearly 50 years before, and claimed, "I had to tell the truth about the novel." In the end he expressed regret: "I am sorry now for that review ... not because of what it said, but because it provided Thurber with the opportunity to make our relationship come to nothing. We were not likely to have become close friends, but we need not have become enemies."

As The New Yorker's main architecture critic from 1987 to 1996, Gill was a successor to Lewis Mumford as the author of the long-running "Skyline" column before Paul Goldberger took his place. He was also a regular contributor to Architectural Digest in the 1980s and 1990s. A champion of architectural preservation and other visual arts, Gill joined Jacqueline Kennedy's coalition to preserve and restore New York's Grand Central Terminal. He also chaired the Andy Warhol Foundation for the Visual Arts and authored 15 books, including Here at The New Yorker and the iconoclastic Frank Lloyd Wright biography Many Masks.

== Death ==
Brendan Gill died of natural causes in 1997, at the age of 83. In a New Yorker "Postscript" following Gill's death, John Updike described him as "avidly alert to the power of art in general."

== Family ==
Gill's son, Michael Gates Gill, is the author of How Starbucks Saved My Life: A Son of Privilege Learns to Live Like Everyone Else. His youngest son, Charles Gill, is the author of the novel The Boozer Challenge.

== Offices held ==
- Chairman of the Andy Warhol Foundation for the Visual Arts
- Chairman of the Municipal Art Society
- Chairman of the New York Landmarks Conservancy
- Vice President of the American Academy of Arts and Letters

== Bibliography ==
=== Non-fiction ===
- Gill, Brendan (January 15, 1949). "Runaway". The Talk of the Town. The New Yorker. 24 (47): 22–23. (Note: I Can Hear it Now - album of speeches and news broadcasts, 1932-45 (with Spencer Klaw).)
- Ross, Lillian & Brendan Gill (February 4, 1950). "The wildest people". The Talk of the Town. The New Yorker. 25 (50): 21–22. (Note: Transit Radio, Inc.)
- Gill, Brendan (February 4, 1950). "Improvisation". The Talk of the Town. The New Yorker. 25 (50): 25. (Note: Hiding telephone lines in the ivy at Princeton (with M. Galt).)
- Cole Porter (Cole Porter biography) (1972)
- Tallulah (Tallulah Bankhead biography) (1972)
- The introduction to Portable Dorothy Parker (Dorothy Parker collection of her stories & columns) (1972)
- Here at The New Yorker (1975)
- Biographical essay as introduction to “States of Grace: Eight Plays by Philip Barry” (1975)
- Summer Places (with Dudley Whitney Hill) (1978)
- The Dream Come True: Great Houses of Los Angeles (1980)
- Lindbergh Alone - May 21, 1927 (1980)
- Fair Land to Build in: The Architecture of the Empire State (1984)
- — (January 14, 1985). "The ignominy of boyhood". The Theatre. The New Yorker. 60 (48): 108–110. (Note: Reviews Bill C. Davis' "Dancing in the End Zone", James Duff's "Home Front" and Rodgers and Hammerstein's "The King and I".)
- — (January 28, 1985). "Notes and comment". The Talk of the Town. The New Yorker. 60 (50): 19–20. (Note: West 44th Street development.)
- Many Masks: A Life of Frank Lloyd Wright (1987)
- New York Life: Of Friends and Others (1990)
- Late Bloomers (1996)

=== Novels ===
- The Trouble of One House (1950)
- The Day the Money Stopped (1957)

=== Short fiction ===
Collections

- Ways of Loving (1974)

Stories

Title	Year	First published	Reprinted/collected	Notes
The night bus to Atlanta		Esquire	Gill, Brendan (1953). "The night bus to Atlanta". In Birmingham, Frederic A. (ed.). The girls from Esquire. London: Arthur Barker. pp. 105–113.	

———————
