= Bennett Cerf =

American publisher and author (1898–1971)

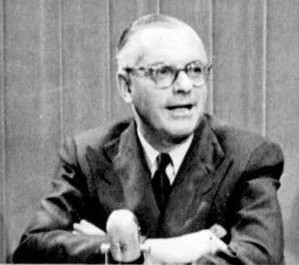
- Cerf on the set of What's My Line? in 1952
- Born: Benoit Cerf; May 25, 1898; New York City, U.S.
- Died: August 27, 1971 (aged 73); Mount Kisco, New York, U.S.
- Education: Columbia University (B.A., Litt.B.)
- Occupations: Humorist; publisher; businessman
- Known for: Co-founder of Random House
- Spouses: Sylvia Sidney (m. 1935; div. 1936) Phyllis Fraser (m. 1940)
- Children: 2, including Christopher
- Writing career
- Years active: 1925–1971

Bennett Alfred Cerf (born Benoît Cerf; May 25, 1898 – August 27, 1971) was an American writer, publisher, and co-founder of the American publishing firm Random House. Cerf was also known for his own compilations of jokes and puns, for regular personal appearances lecturing across the United States, and for his weekly television appearances for 16 years on the panel game show What's My Line?

== Early life and education ==
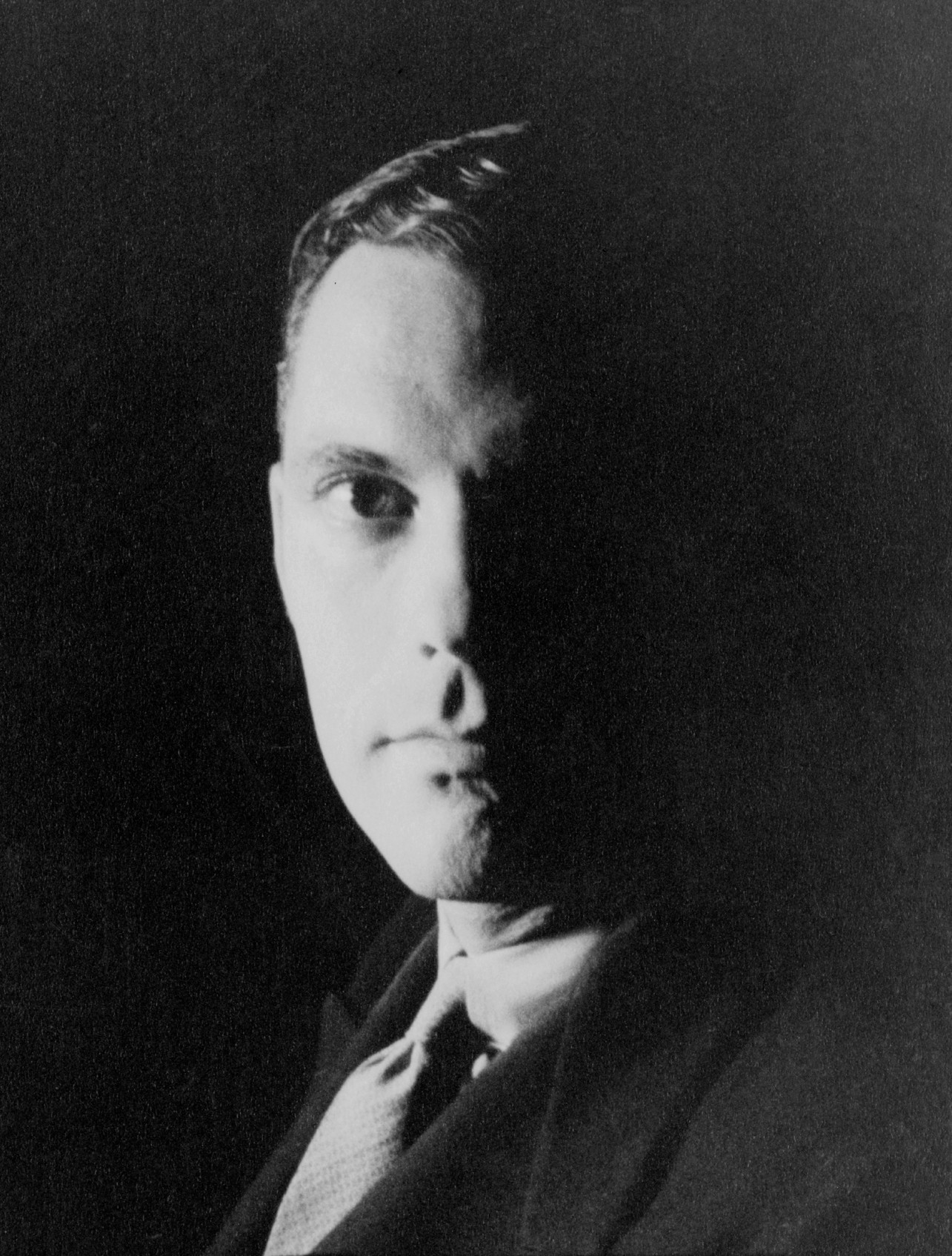
Cerf photographed by Carl Van Vechten in 1932

Cerf was born on May 25, 1898, on 134 East 80th Street in Manhattan, New York City, to a Jewish family of Alsatian and German ethnicity. Cerf's father Gustave Cerf was a lithographer; his mother, Frederika Wise, was heiress to a tobacco-distribution fortune. She died when Bennett was 16; shortly afterward, her brother Herbert moved into the Cerf household and became a strong literary and social influence on the teenager.

Cerf graduated from Townsend Harris Hall Prep School in the Hamilton Heights neighborhood of Manhattan in 1916, the same public school as publisher Richard Simon, author Herman Wouk, and playwright Howard Dietz. He spent his teenage years at 790 Riverside Drive, an apartment building in Washington Heights, which was home to two of his friends who became prominent as adults: Howard Dietz and Hearst newspapers financial editor Merryle Rukeyser. Cerf received his Bachelor of Arts from Columbia College of Columbia University (1919) and his Litt.B. (1920) from its School of Journalism.

== Career ==
After graduating from Columbia University, Cerf worked briefly as a reporter for the New York Herald Tribune and for some time in a Wall Street brokerage. He then was named a vice president at Boni & Liveright, a publishing company.

In 1925, Cerf and Donald S. Klopfer formed a partnership to purchase the rights to the Modern Library from Boni & Liveright, and they went into business for themselves. The two increased the popularity of the series; in 1927, they began publishing general trade books "at random."

=== Random House ===
Cerf and Klopfer's acquisition of Modern Library was the beginning of their publishing business, which they later named Random House. The publishing company used as its logo a little house drawn by Cerf's friend and fellow Columbia alumnus Rockwell Kent.

Cerf's talent in building and maintaining relationships brought contracts with such writers as William Faulkner, John O'Hara, Eugene O'Neill, James Michener, Truman Capote, Theodor Seuss Geisel, and others. He published Atlas Shrugged, written by Ayn Rand, though he vehemently disagreed with her philosophy of Objectivism. He admired her "sincerity" and "brillian[ce]", and Rand became a friend. However, when Cerf refused to publish Rand's 1964 book The Virtue of Selfishness (which was originally titled The Fascist New Frontier), Rand changed publishers; the two never spoke again.

In 1933, Cerf won United States v. One Book Called Ulysses, a landmark court case against government censorship. Thereafter, he was the first in the United States to publish James Joyce's unabridged Ulysses. (Originally published in Paris by Sylvia Beach in 1922. One chapter from its previous serialization in Margaret Anderson and Jane Heap's Chicago-based literary magazine, The Little Review, had led to its being found "a work of obscenity".)

Random House had the rights to publish the book in the United States in 1932, and they arranged for a test case to challenge the implicit ban so as to publish the work without fear of prosecution. The publisher, therefore, made an arrangement to import the book and to have a copy seized by the United States Customs Service when it arrived. After seizure, the United States attorney took seven months before deciding whether to proceed further; although the assistant U.S. attorney assigned to assess the work's obscenity considered it a "literary masterpiece", he also felt it was obscene within the meaning of the law. The office then sued under the Tariff Act of 1930, which allowed a district attorney to bring an action against obscene literature. Cerf later presented the book in question to Columbia University.

In 1944, Cerf published the first of his books of jokes and anecdotes, Try and Stop Me, with illustrations drawn by Carl Rose. A second book, Shake Well Before Using, was published in 1949. Then, he became a member of the Peabody Awards board of jurors, where he served from 1946 to 1967 and 1970–1971. He was chair juror of the Peabody Jurors Board from 1954 to the end of his first term in 1967, and published a weekly column, "The Cerf Board", in the Sunday supplement magazine This Week. Cerf was also inducted into Omicron Delta Kappa in 1967 at Florida Southern College.

In 1959, Maco Magazine Corporation published what became known as "The Cream of the Master's Crop", a compilation of Cerf's jokes, gags, stories, puns, and wit.

== Television appearances ==
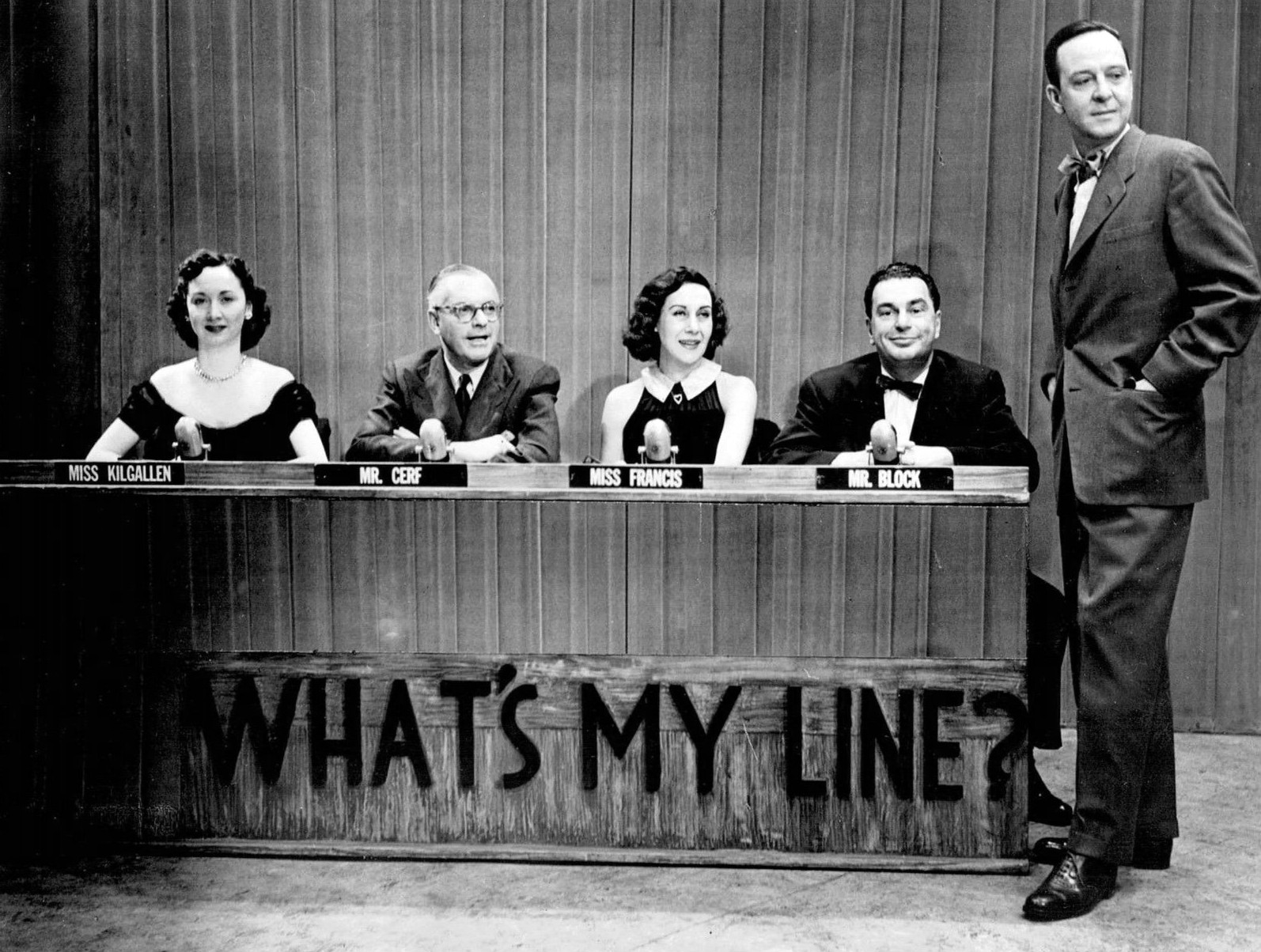
Left to right: Dorothy Kilgallen, Cerf, Arlene Francis, Hal Block, and host John Daly on What's My Line? in 1952

Before 1951, Cerf was an occasional panelist on the NBC game show Who Said That?, on which celebrities tried to identify the speakers of quotations taken from recent news reports. In 1951, he began appearing weekly on What's My Line?, where he stayed for 16 years, until the show ended its run on CBS in 1967. Until his death, Cerf continued to appear regularly on the CBS Films (now Viacom) syndicated version of What's My Line?, along with Arlene Francis.

Cerf was known as "Bennett Snerf" in a Sesame Street puppet parody of What's My Line?

During Cerf's time on the CBS version of What's My Line?, he received an honorary degree from the University of Puget Sound, and an honorary doctorate of letters in November 1965 from William Jewell College, in Liberty, Missouri. For the latter, he was present on the William Jewell campus while his television colleague Dorothy Kilgallen's funeral was taking place in New York. His second wife Phyllis Fraser was among numerous attendees at the funeral who were mentioned in a November 11, 1965 article in the New York Journal-American, for which Bennett regularly wrote a humorous column. It had published Kilgallen's newspaper work before it was reprinted outside New York. Cerf's column with jokes and riddles expired five months after Kilgallen's funeral as a result of the Journal-American shutting down.

Cerf twice was a juror at the Miss America pageant.

Cerf was interviewed in 1967 and 1968 by Robin Hawkins, a freelancer working for the Oral History Research Office at Columbia University. Cerf said that he was "genuinely proud of" the awards that had been bestowed on him by The Yale Record and The Harvard Lampoon.

In July 1970, Cerf was the subject of an exposé by Jessica Mitford, published in Atlantic Monthly, which denounced the business practices of the Famous Writers School, which Cerf founded.

=== Characterizations ===
S. J. Perelman's 1945 feuilleton "No Dearth of Mirth, Fill Out the Coupon", describes Perelman's fictionalized encounter with a jokebook publisher named Barnaby Chirp. Perelman's 1962 play The Beauty Part features the caricature Emmett Stagg of the book-publishing empire Charnel House, who was based on Cerf and played on Broadway by William LeMessena. He was similarly portrayed as publisher Bennett Blake on The Patty Duke Show in the 1964 episode "Auld Lang Syne". In 2006, Peter Bogdanovich portrayed Cerf in the film Infamous.

== Personal life ==
In the early 1930s, Cerf had a passionate relationship with actress Miriam Hopkins.

Cerf married actress Sylvia Sidney on October 1, 1935; they divorced six months later, on April 9, 1936.

On September 17, 1940, he married actress Phyllis Fraser, a cousin of Ginger Rogers, with whom he had two sons, Christopher and Jonathan.

In the early 1950s, while maintaining a Manhattan residence, Bennett and Phyllis Cerf bought an estate at Mount Kisco, New York, which became his country home for the rest of his life. A Mount Kisco street named Cerf Lane, named after him, runs from Croton Avenue in Mount Kisco.

== Death ==
Cerf died of natural causes in Mount Kisco, on August 27, 1971, aged 73. He had undergone surgery shortly before his death.

== Legacy ==
Random House published his posthumous autobiography, At Random: The Reminiscences of Bennett Cerf, in 1977, which Phyllis Cerf and former Random House Editor Albert Erskine put together from his interviews for Columbia's oral history program along with his diaries and scrapbooks.

The biography Nothing Random: Bennett Cerf and the Publishing House He Built by Gayle Feldman (ISBN 9780593978375) was published in 2026.

Bennett Cerf Drive, just outside the City of Westminster in Carroll County, Maryland, is named after him. This is the location of the Random House Westminster Distribution Center and Offices, one of two Random House distribution facilities in the U.S., as well as the location of Bennett Cerf Park.

Western Maryland College (now McDaniel College), located in Westminster, Maryland, awarded Bennett Cerf an honorary Doctor of Laws at its commencement exercises in June, 1966.

== Bibliography ==
- The Arabian Nights: or the Book of a Thousand and One Nights (anthology; New Illustrations and Decorations by Steele Savage; printed and bound by The Cornwall Press, Inc., for Blue Ribbon Books, Inc., 1932)
- The Bedside Book of Famous American Stories (anthology, 1936)
- The Bedside Book of Famous British Stories (anthology, 1940)
- The Pocket Book of War Humor (anthology, 1943)
- Try and Stop Me (1944)
- Famous Ghost Stories (anthology, 1944)
- Laughing Stock (1945)
- Anything for a Laugh: a collection of jokes and anecdotes that you, too, can tell and probably have (1946)
- Shake Well Before Using (1948)
- The Unexpected (anthology, 1948)
- Laughter Incorporated (1950)
- Good for a Laugh (1952)
- An Encyclopedia of Modern American Humor (anthology, Doubleday & Co., Inc., 1954) LCCN 54-11449
- The Life of the Party (1956)
- The Laugh's on Me (1959)
- Laugh Day (1965)
- At Random: The Reminiscences of Bennett Cerf (New York: Random House, 1977, ISBN 0-375-75976-X).
- Dear Donald, Dear Bennett: the wartime correspondence of Donald Klopfer and Bennett Cerf (New York: Random House, 2002). ISBN 0-375-50768-X.
- Bennett Cerf's Book of Laughs (New York: Beginner Books, Inc., 1959) LCCN 59-13387
- Bennett Cerf's Book of Riddles (1960)
- "Bennett Cerf's Book of Animal Riddles" (1964)
- Bennett Cerf's Bumper Crop (2 volume set)
- Bennett Cerf's Houseful of Laughter
- Bennett Cerf's Treasury of Atrocious Puns (1968; possibly the last book he published)
- Stories to Make You Feel Better (1972)

== Music ==
The band Shadowy Men On A Shadowy Planet have a song called "Bennett Cerf" on their 1988 album "Savvy Show Stoppers".
