= Alan Dunn (cartoonist) =

American cartoonist and author

Alan Dunn (1900–1974) was a cartoonist known for his work in The New Yorker. He also had architectural expertise and submitted work to the magazine Architectural Record. He was married to fellow cartoonist, Mary Petty.

Dunn studied at Columbia University, the National Academy of Design and the American Academy in Rome.

He eventually became The New Yorker's most prolific illustrator, creating nine covers and nearly 2000 cartoons over 47 years.

A cartoon of his is credited with inspiring the Fermi Paradox.

Dunn and Petty donated their papers to Syracuse University.

== Books ==
- Dunn, Alan (1931). Rejections. New York: A. A. Knopf. LCCN 31024154. 96 pp.
- Sayre, Joel (1932). Rackety rax; with sixteen illustrations by Alan Dunn. New York: A. A. Knopf. LCCN 32004563.
- Giles, Nell (1943). Punch In, Susie! A Woman's War Factory Diary; with illustrations by Alan Dunn. New York and London: Harper & Brothers Publishers.
- Dunn, Alan (1945). Who's paying for this cab? A book of cartoons from the New Yorker. New York: Simon and Schuster. LCCN 45009675. 128 pp.
- Dunn, Alan (1947). The last lath. New York. LCCN 47008279. 96 pp.
- Dunn, Alan (1948). East of Fifth; the story of an apartment house. New York: Simon and Schuster. LCCN 48005632. 168 pp.
- Dunn, Alan (1956). Should it gurgle? A cartoon portfolio, 1946–1956. New York: Simon and Schuster. LCCN 56058509.
- Hodgins, Eric (1959). Enough time? The pattern of executive life. With drawings by Alan Dunn. Doubleday: Doubleday. LCCN 59012630. 102 pp.
- Dunn, Alan (1960). Is there intelligent life on earth? A report to the Congress of Mars. Translated into English by the author. New York: Simon and Schuster. LCCN 60006091. 118 pp.
- Dunn, Alan (1968). A portfolio of social cartoons, 1957–1968. New York: Simon and Schuster. LCCN 68008119. 159 pp.
- Dunn, Alan (1970). Architecture Observed. New York: Architectural Record Books. ISBN 0070183058. LCCN 75165515. 144 pp.
- Dunn, Alan; et al. (1981). New Yorker : an exhibition of humorous drawings. Syracuse, NY: Syracuse University Art Collections. LCCN 81177305. 36 pp.
