= Here at The New Yorker =

1975 book

- First edition
- Author: Brendan Gill
- Publisher: Random House
- Publication date: 1975

Here at The New Yorker is a 1975 best-selling book by American writer Brendan Gill, writer and drama critic for The New Yorker magazine.

== The book ==
Published on the fiftieth anniversary of the founding of The New Yorker, Gill's book is a semi-autobiographical memoir built around his time as an editor and writer at the magazine and written in the style of the "Talk of the Town" section to which Gill contributed for many years. Much of the book is devoted to anecdotes about his best-known colleagues, such as cartoonists Peter Arno, Charles Addams, and James Thurber; writers Truman Capote, John Updike, S.J. Perelman, and John O'Hara; critics Wolcott Gibbs and Robert Benchley; and editors Katharine White, Harold Ross, and William Shawn.

Gill admits in the introduction that his view of his colleagues is at times highly biased. He detested James Thurber, for instance, calling him a "malicious man" who for his own amusement instigated a number of feuds between New Yorker writers, including one between Gill himself and writer John O'Hara over a book review. Despite respecting Harold Ross for his work on the magazine, Gill reveals his "primitive" and "embarrassing" racism, which excluded blacks from even the most menial positions with the magazine and kept black writers and even article subjects out of its pages. His portrait of William Shawn, however, appeared unsound to some reviewers; Gill portrayed Shawn as a gentle and kind man, but also showed Shawn firing an employee simply for displaying mildly bad taste while off duty. Gill also describes Shawn's well-known prudery, including his reactions to the phrase "cow paddies" and to Henry Green's inspiration for his novel Loving, yet refrains from mentioning that for many years Shawn was leading a double life, with a wife and children in the suburbs and a mistress (Lillian Ross, a colleague who later wrote about the affair) and stepson in the city.

== Reception ==
Here at The New Yorker first appeared on The New York Times Best Seller list on March 16, 1975, remaining on the list for sixteen weeks and reaching No. 2 on May 25. It was reprinted in paperback both by Random House and by Berkley Medallion Press. A revised edition was published in 1987 with a new introduction, and was reprinted in 1997, the year of Gill's death.

=== Reviews ===
Reviews of Here at The New Yorker were favorable. Christopher Lehmann-Haupt wrote in The New York Times Book Review that "Mr. Gill kept me in a continual state of mirth", adding that Gill's barbs against his colleagues "are more like a cloud of affectionate bumble bees—these paragraphs full of facts: they settle everywhere and sting all." Other positive reviews were published in The Washington Post, the Christian Science Monitor, and Time magazine, where reviewer Paul Gray said, "A seasoned New Yorker writer can make even New Yorker writers interesting."

=== Response by colleagues ===
Gill's subjects did not all share the enthusiasm of his more positive reviewers. Fellow writer E.J. Kahn called the book "that Gill book" in his own About The New Yorker and Me: A Sentimental Journal, and Nora Ephron said in Esquire (as quoted in Gill's 1997 New York Times obituary) that it "seems to me one of the most offensive books I have read in a long time". Gill wrote in his introduction to the 1987 edition (which was also printed in The New York Times) that Katharine White wept for two days over his portrayal of her, which he defends as accurate. He then accused E. B. White of spearheading a "strenuous campaign of falsehoods" against him, including the claim that William Shawn, the editor of the magazine at the time the book was first published, had not been allowed to read the book before publication. Gill asserted that he had read the book twice in manuscript and had even contributed the book's title, and in turn relates a number of unflattering stories about the recently deceased White, at least two of which were contested by Leo M. Dolenski in a letter to the editor of the Times. Gill's reply to Dolenski's letter instigated a feud between the two.
