= On the Internet, nobody knows you're a dog =

Adage and meme about internet anonymity

"On the Internet, nobody knows you're a dog" is an adage and Internet meme about Internet anonymity that began as a caption to a cartoon drawn by Peter Steiner and published in the July 5, 1993, issue of the American magazine The New Yorker. The words are those of a large dog sitting on a chair at a desk, with a paw on the computer's keyboard, speaking to a smaller dog on the floor nearby.

Peter Steiner's 1993 cartoon, as published in The New Yorker

By 2013, Steiner had earned between $200,000 and $250,000 from the cartoon's reprinting, and it had become The New Yorker's most reproduced cartoon. In 2023, the original was sold at auction for $175,000, a record for the highest price ever paid for a cartoon.

== History ==
Peter Steiner, a cartoonist and contributor to The New Yorker since 1979, has said that although he did have an online account in 1993, he felt no particular interest in the Internet then. He drew the cartoon only in the manner of a "make-up-a-caption" item, to which he recalled attaching no "profound" meaning, seeing that it initially received little attention. After the cartoon took on a life of its own, he said he felt as if he had created the "smiley face" and could not "quite fathom that it's that widely known and recognized".

On October 6, 2023, the original artwork was sold at a Heritage Auctions sale of illustration art for $175,000.

== Context ==
Once the exclusive domain of government engineers and academics, the Internet was in 1993 becoming a subject of discussion in such general interest magazines as The New Yorker. In a 1993 Time magazine article, Lotus Development founder and early Internet activist Mitch Kapor said, "the true sign that popular interest has reached critical mass came this summer when The New Yorker printed a cartoon showing two computer-savvy canines".

According to Bob Mankoff, then The New Yorker's cartoon editor, "The cartoon resonated with our wariness about the facile façade that could be thrown up by anyone with a rudimentary knowledge of HTML."

== Implications ==
The cartoon symbolizes the liberation of one's Internet presence from popular prejudices. Sociologist Sherry Turkle said: "You can be whoever you want to be. You can completely redefine yourself if you want. You don't have to worry about the slots other people put you in as much. They don't look at your body and make assumptions. They don't hear your accent and make assumptions. All they see are your words." This is a view Steiner has said he shares.

The cartoon conveys an understanding of Internet privacy that implies the ability to send and receive messages—or create and maintain a website—behind a mask of anonymity. Lawrence Lessig suggests that "no one knows" because Internet protocols do not require users to confirm their own identity. Although a local access point in, for example, a university may require identity confirmation, it holds such information privately, without embedding it in external Internet transactions.

A 2000 study by Morahan-Martin and Schumacher on Internet addiction disorder discusses this phenomenon, suggesting the ability to represent oneself behind the mask of a computer screen may be part of the compulsion to go online. The phrase may be taken "to mean that cyberspace will be liberatory because gender, race, age, looks, or even 'dogness' are potentially absent or alternatively fabricated or exaggerated with unchecked creative license for a multitude of purposes both legal and illegal", an understanding that echoed statements made in 1996 by John Gilmore, a key figure in the history of Usenet. The phrase also indicates the ease of computer cross-dressing: representing oneself as of a different gender; age; race; social, cultural, or economic class, etc. In a similar sense, "the freedom which the dog chooses to avail itself of is the freedom to 'pass' as part of a privileged group; i.e., human computer users with access to the Internet".

== In popular culture ==
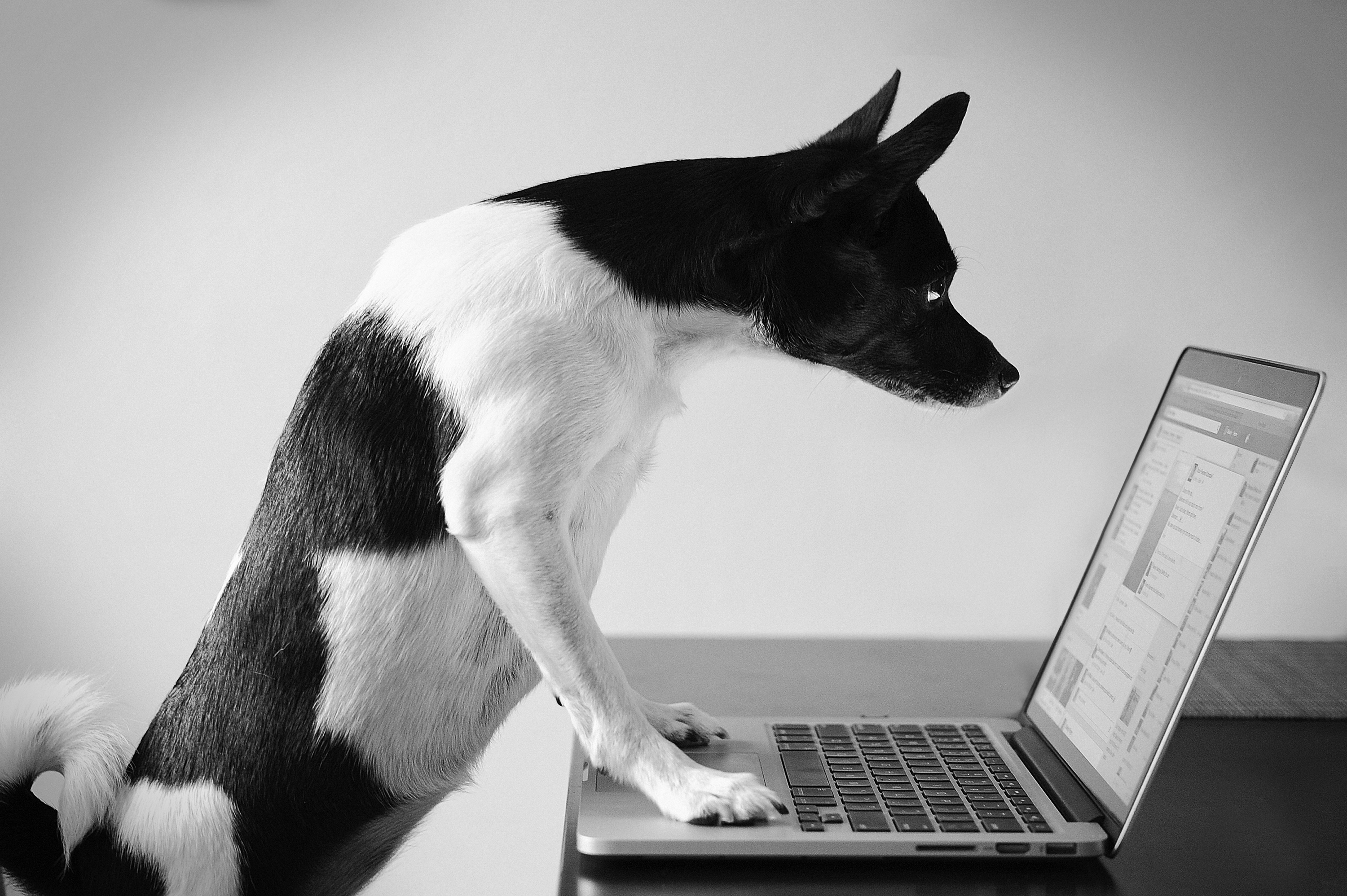
2014 US Air Force photo of a dog at a computer

- The cartoon inspired the play Nobody Knows I'm a Dog by Alan David Perkins. The play revolves around six individuals, unable to communicate effectively with people in their lives, who nonetheless find the courage to socialize anonymously on the Internet.
- Cyberdog, an Internet suite by Apple Inc., was named after this cartoon.
- A cartoon by Kaamran Hafeez published in The New Yorker on February 23, 2015, features a similar pair of dogs watching their owner sitting at a computer, with one asking the other, "Remember when, on the Internet, nobody knew who you were?"
- It has become a frequently used refrain in discussions about the Internet and as such has become an Internet meme, perhaps iconic in Internet culture.

== See also ==
- Dead Internet theory – Concept involving online bot activity
- Therian subculture – Individuals who identify as nonhuman animals
- Animal–computer interaction – Field of research
- Dog with a Blog – American comedy television series
