= Bob Mankoff =

American cartoonist and editor (born 1944)

Robert Mankoff
- Born: May 1, 1944 (age 82) Bronx, New York, U.S.
- Areas: Cartoonist, Editor
- Notable works: How About Never — Is Never Good for You?: A Life in Cartoons; The Naked Cartoonist: A Way to Enhance your Creativity

Robert Mankoff (born May 1, 1944) is an American cartoonist, editor, and author. He was the cartoon editor for The New Yorker for nearly twenty years. Before he succeeded Lee Lorenz as cartoon editor at The New Yorker, Mankoff was a New Yorker cartoonist for twenty years.

== Early life ==
Mankoff grew up in Queens, New York, and attended Music and Art High School (graduating in 1962) and Syracuse University (graduating in 1966).

== Career ==
Mankoff is the founder and President of Cartoon Collections, a cartoon licensing database, which also owns CartoonStock.com based in the UK.

Mankoff submitted more than 500 cartoons to The New Yorker for over two years before he had his first one published in 1977. One of his cartoons (captioned "No, Thursday's out. How about never—is never good for you?") is one of The New Yorker's most widely reprinted cartoons.

In 1992, Mankoff founded the online Cartoon Bank, a licensing platform for New Yorker cartoons and art, with more than 85,000 cartoons available for sale.

Mankoff was hired as New Yorker cartoon editor in 1997; he credits his administration of the Cartoon Bank as being an important reason for why he was chosen to replace Lee Lorenz, (who himself had been at the magazine for 20+ years). Tina Brown, The New Yorker's editor at the time, said of Mankoff, "Bob is not only a brilliant cartoonist himself, he's also an impassioned promoter, defender and curator of the art of cartooning. . . . He's put himself out to nurture cartoonists."

Mankoff edited at least 14 collections of New Yorker cartoons, including The Complete Cartoons of the New Yorker (Black Dog & Leventhal, 2004), a compilation of every cartoon published since the magazine was founded. The hardcover book is a 656-page collection of what Mankoff deemed to be the magazine's best cartoons published during the magazine's first 80 years, plus a double CD set with all 68,647 cartoons published to that point.

Mankoff once stated that his all-time favorite New Yorker cartoonist was Jack Ziegler. He has also cited Shel Silverstein as an artist he would have liked as a contributing cartoonist. Under Mankoff, the magazine brought in a new generation of cartoonists (including a number of female contributors); notable names include Pat Byrnes, J. C. Duffy, P. C. Vey, Farley Katz, Emily Flake, and Julia Suits. Mankoff usually contributed a short article to each issue of The New Yorker, describing some aspect of the cartooning process or the methods used to select cartoons for the magazine.

Under Mankoff's stewardship, in April 2005 the magazine began using the last page of each issue for the subsequently very popular "The New Yorker Cartoon Caption Contest" (prior that date, the Caption Contest had appeared as a back-page feature in the magazine's annual "Cartoon Issue"). Mankoff himself contributes cartoons to Moment magazine's own monthly cartoon caption contest.

In 2016, Mankoff co-founded Botnik Studios with Jamie Brew, a former ClickHole and The Onion writer. On April 29, 2017, he left The New Yorker, and was named Humor and Cartoon Editor at Esquire magazine on May 1, 2017. Mankoff resigned from his position at Esquire in June 2019. Mankoff was named cartoon editor of Graydon Carter and Alessandra Stanley's digital newsletter, Air Mail, in July 2019.

== Personal life ==
Mankoff and his wife Cory live in Briarcliff Manor, New York; they have one daughter together, Sarah. Cory also had a son who died in 2012.

== Film ==
The 2015 documentary, Very Semi-Serious, presents a behind-the-scenes look at the cartoons of The New Yorker, and features glimpses into Mankoff's career, his role at The New Yorker, and his personal life. The film was produced by Redora Films.

== Bibliography ==
- Urban Bumpkins (St. Martin's/Marek, 1985) ISBN 0312834306
- Call Your Office (Topper Books, 1986) ISBN 0886872782
- It's Lonely at the Top (Ballantine Books, 1987) ISBN 0886873169
- The Naked Cartoonist: A Way to Enhance Your Creativity (Black Dog & Leventhal, 2002)
- How About Never — Is Never Good for You?: A Life in Cartoons (Henry Holt, 2014) ISBN 9780805095906 — published to positive reviews in The New York Times and the Wall Street Journal
- "William Hamilton". The Talk of the Town. Postscript. The New Yorker. 92 (11): 36. April 25, 2016. (Note: Title in the online table of contents is "William Hamilton's incisive jabs".)
