= Marvin Townsend =

American cartoonist

Marvin Townsend (July 2, 1915 - November 26, 1999) was an American cartoonist known for his gag comics featured in various publications including Treasure Chest Fun and Fact, Cartoon Spice, and pulp magazines such as Amazing Stories, Argosy and others.

Townsend was born in Kansas City, Missouri.

== Bibliography ==
A significant collection of his materials, including fan mail and a Certificate of Merit for cartooning, are housed in the Syracuse University Library.

- Laugh Out (1970)
- Ghostly Ghastly Cartoons (1971)
- Laugh It Up (1974)

=== As Illustrator ===
- Moontoons Jokes & Riddles (1970)
- Fun for All: Jokes and Cartoons to Make You Laugh (1977)
