= Douglas Dick =

American actor (1920–2015)

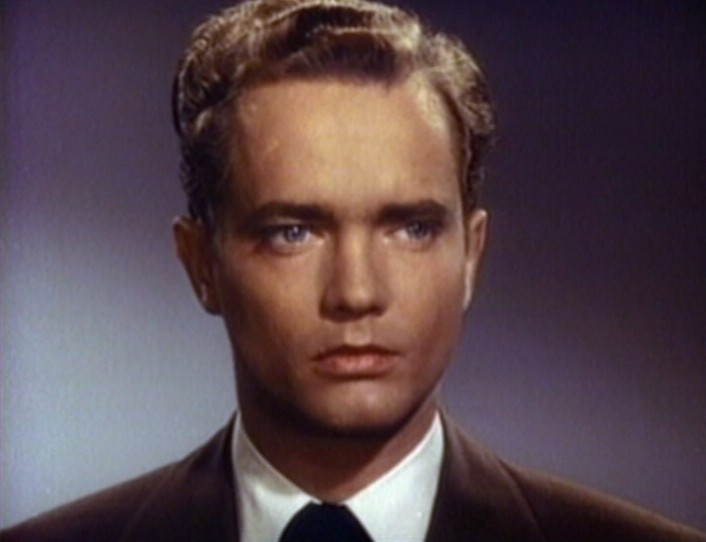
- Dick in a trailer for Rope (1948)
- Born: Douglas Harvey Dick; November 20, 1920; Charleston, West Virginia, U.S.
- Died: December 19, 2015 (aged 95); Los Angeles, California, U.S.
- Occupations: Actor; screenwriter; psychologist
- Years active: 1946–1971, 1971–1990
- Spouses: Ronnie Cowan (m. 1959; div. 1960) Peggy Chantler (m. 1963; died 2001)

Douglas Harvey Dick (November 20, 1920 – December 19, 2015) was an American actor and occasional screenwriter. His most famous role came in the 1948 film Rope. In 1971, Dick left the entertainment industry to work as a psychologist.

== Early years ==
Dick was born in Charleston, West Virginia, and raised in Versailles, Kentucky. He was the son of Mr. and Mrs. Gamble C. Dick, and he had a brother, Gamble C. Dick Jr. He attended the University of Arizona and the University of Kentucky.

Before he began working in films, Dick appeared in several shows in New York and was a model for the Conover agency. One issue of Look magazine featured his picture on the cover.

== Military service ==
Dick did patrol duty with the United States Coast Guard and served as an aviator in the United States Navy, receiving a medical discharge from the latter.

== Film ==
Dick's film debut was in The Searching Wind (1946). Producer Hal B. Wallis met Dick in a Broadway agent's office as Dick was waiting for an interview. Wallis had Dick make a screen test in New York City. The test, along with those of five other prospects, was shown to 300 women employees of Wallis' studio. Dick was the clear favorite when the women were polled, and his role in The Searching Wind was the result. His best known film role is Kenneth Lawrence in the Alfred Hitchcock film classic Rope (1948). Among his other notable films are Casbah (1948), The Red Badge of Courage (1951) and Something to Live For (1952).

== Television ==
On television, Douglas Dick is best known for his role as Carl Herrick in the television series, Waterfront (1954–1955).

Dick appeared once on Jim Davis' syndicated adventure series, Rescue 8. Additionally, he made two appearances on Lloyd Bridges' syndicated adventure series, Sea Hunt. He made seven guest appearances on Perry Mason throughout the duration of the CBS series from 1957 to 1966. In 1959, he played Fred Bushmiller in the title role in "The Case of the Watery Witness." In the 1962 episode, "The Case of the Glamorous Ghost," he played Walter Richey, a hotel clerk and the murderer. He played murder suspect Ned Chase in the 1963 episode, "The Case of the Elusive Element." He made his final appearance in 1965 as Ted Harberson in "The Case of the Wrathful Wraith."

== Personal life ==
Dick married twice: first to Ronnie Cowan until their 1960 divorce, and second to television screenwriter Peggy Chantler from 1963 until her death in 2001. Dick retired from acting and became a psychologist in 1971.

== Filmography ==
- The Searching Wind (1946) as Sam Hazen (film debut).
- Saigon (1948) as Captain Mike Perry
- Casbah (1948) as Carlo
- Rope (1948) as Kenneth Lawrence
- The Accused (1949) as Bill Perry
- Home of the Brave (1949) as Major Robinson
- The Red Badge of Courage (1951) as The Lieutenant
- Something to Live For (1952) as Baker
- A Yank in Indo-China (1952) as Clint Marshall
- The Iron Mistress (1952) as Narcisse de Bornay
- So This Is Love (1953) as Bryan Curtis
- The Gambler from Natchez (1953) as Claude St. Germaine
- Footsteps in the Night (1957) as Henry Johnson
- The Oklahoman (1957) as Mel Dobie
- Official Detective US series - Episode: "Loan Companies" as Schmidt (1958)
- North to Alaska (1960) as Lieutenant (uncredited)
- Flaming Star (1960) as Will Howard
- Dawn of Victory (1966) (short subject) as Dysmas

== Television roles ==
With reduced film-work on offer to him he moved into television acting and guest-starred in the following:

Hazel (1961 TV series) guest star as Gabe Fairchild S3E10
- Waterfront (1955) as Carl Herrick
- Man with a Camera (1959) S2E2, "Eyewitness" as Ed Minnit the murderer
- The Life and Legend of Wyatt Earp (guest-star)
- Sea Hunt (guest-star)
- 77 Sunset Strip (guest-star)
- Perry Mason (1957) S5E19, "The Case of the Glamorous Ghost" as Walter Richey the murderer
- Bonanza (1963): Episode “Alias Joe Cartwright” (guest-star)
- The Man from U.N.C.L.E." episode The Man from THRUSH Affair (1967) as Specialist
- Mannix (1971) as George Hewitt
- The Bold Ones: The New Doctors (1971) as Curt Holliman (final film role)
