= George Price (cartoonist) =

American cartoonist (1901–1995)

Cartoon by George Price from an Ætna Casualty advertisement published in 1959

George Price (June 9, 1901 – January 12, 1995) was an American cartoonist who was born in Fort Lee, New Jersey. After doing advertising artwork in his youth, Price started doing cartoons for The New Yorker magazine in 1929. He continued contributing to the New Yorker well into his eighties, displaying a talent for both graphic innovation (many of his cartoons consisted of a single, unending line) and for a wit that somehow combined the small issues of domestic life with a topical sensibility.

Born on June 9, 1901, in the Coytesville section of Fort Lee, New Jersey, Price lived in nearby Tenafly and died on January 12, 1995, at Englewood Hospital and Medical Center.
