= Peter Steiner (cartoonist) =

American cartoonist and novelist (born 1940)

- Born: 1940 (age 85–86); Cincinnati, Ohio, U.S.
- Education: University of Miami (BA); Free University of Berlin; University of Pittsburgh (MA, PhD)
- Occupations: Cartoonist; painter; novelist
- Known for: Prompting the adage "On the Internet, nobody knows you're a dog"
- Website: www.plsteiner.com

Peter Steiner (born 1940) is an American cartoonist, painter, and novelist, best known for a 1993 cartoon published by The New Yorker which prompted the adage "On the Internet, nobody knows you're a dog." He is also a novelist who has published four crime novels.

== Early life and career ==
Peter Steiner was born in Cincinnati, Ohio, in 1940 and raised there. His parents had emigrated from Austria in the 1930s.

He attended the University of Miami and spent his junior year at the Free University of Berlin. He earned his B.A. from the University of Miami. After serving in the United States Army in Germany, he earned his M.A. and Ph.D. in German literature from the University of Pittsburgh in 1967 and 1969 respectively.

He was a professor of German literature at Dickinson College in Carlisle, Pennsylvania, for eight years before turning to being a cartoonist, artist, and a writer of novels.

== Cartoons ==
Steiner has contributed cartoons and other material to The New Yorker since 1979.

His cartoon captioned "On the Internet, nobody knows you're a dog" is the most reproduced cartoon from The New Yorker. Steiner is also well known for his daily cartoons on contemporary events for the Washington Times, which he created for over 20 years, starting in 1983. One selection of these cartoons, titled I Didn't Bite the Man. I Bit the Office, was published in 1994. For several years in the late 1990s and early 2000s, he also made cartoons for The Weekly Standard.

== Novels ==
Steiner has published four novels, all featuring a former CIA agent named Louis Morgon who has retired to the Loire Valley in France. Of his 2010 novel The Terrorist, The New York Times reviewer Marilyn Stasio wrote that "While it can't be said that any of [the plot] is the least bit plausible, Steiner presents us with a reassuring fantasy world in which rash youths bow to the wisdom of their elders, terrorists abort their missions out of compassion for their human targets and the innocent victims of egregious acts of cruelty find it in their hearts to forgive."

=== Novels published ===
- A French Country Murder, retitled Le Crime when it came out in paperback
- L'Assassin
- The Terrorist (2010)
- The Resistance
- The Capitalist (2016)
- The Good Cop (2019), a Willi Geismeier thriller, 1
- The Constant Man (6/1/2021), a Willi Geismeier thriller, 2
