= Carl Rose (cartoonist) =

American cartoonist

Carl Rose (1903 – 1971) was an American cartoonist whose work appeared in The New Yorker, Popular Science, The Saturday Evening Post, and elsewhere. He received the National Cartoonists Society's Advertising and Illustration Award for 1958.

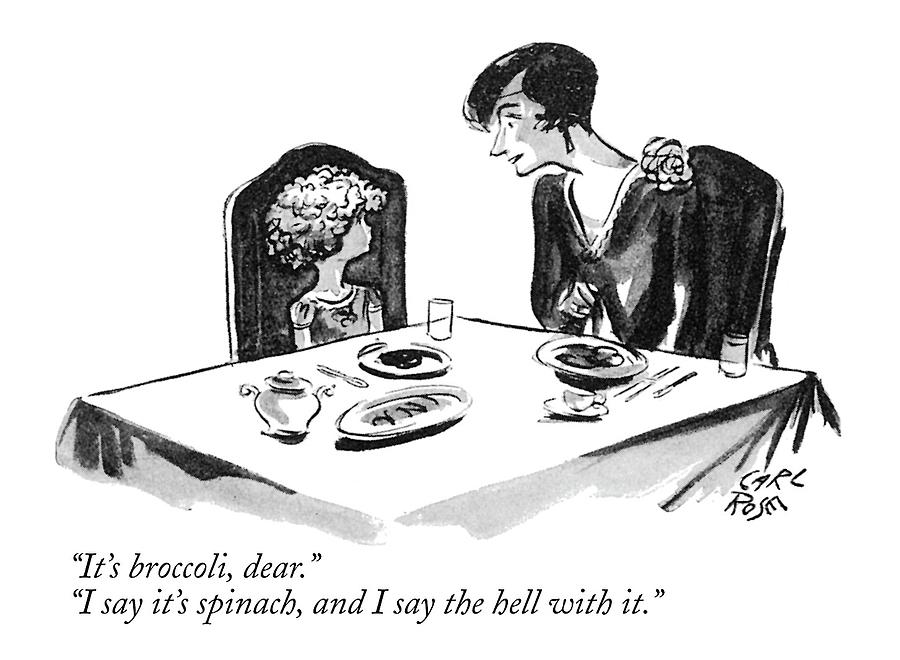
Rose's famous "I say it's spinach" cartoon

Rose created one of the most famous New Yorker cartoons, published December 8, 1928, with a caption by E. B. White. In the cartoon, a mother at dinner says to her young daughter, "It's broccoli, dear." Her daughter answers, "I say it's spinach, and I say the hell with it." (The phrase "I say it's spinach" entered the vernacular; in 1932, Irving Berlin's popular Broadway revue Face The Music included the song "I Say It's Spinach (And The Hell With It)".) Elizabeth Hawes adopted it for her critique of the clothing design industry: Fashion is Spinach (1938).

Rose illustrated Bennett Cerf's best-selling book Try and Stop Me and its sequel Shake Well Before Using. Rose also illustrated Have Tux, Will Travel, the supposed autobiography of actor Bob Hope (actually ghost-written by journalist Pete Martin).

Between 1958 and 1961 he also illustrated the educational comic strip Our New Age, written by Dr. Athelstan Spilhaus.
