= Sam Cobean =

American animator and cartoonist (1913–1951)

Sam Cobean (December 28, 1913 – July 2, 1951) was an American animator and cartoonist, especially known for his work in The New Yorker in the 1940s and 1950s.

Cobean worked at Walt Disney Productions in the 1930s and 1940s. His book of cartoons, The Naked Eye, has been published around the world. Likewise, the book published after his death, The Cartoons of Cobean has enjoyed worldwide popularity since its publication in 1952. He was killed driving his Jaguar when he rear-ended another vehicle. His passenger Cameron Argetsinger, founder of Watkins Glen racing, was injured.
