= Julia Suits =

American cartoonist

- Born: St. Louis, Missouri, U.S.
- Education: Beloit College (BFA); Ohio State University (MFA)
- Occupation: Cartoonist

Julia Suits is a contributing cartoonist for The New Yorker and other publications.

Born in St. Louis, Missouri, Suits received a BFA in painting from Beloit College and an MFA from Ohio State University. Her editorial portraits, syndicated by Creators Syndicate from 1988 to 2008, appeared in newspapers worldwide, including the Los Angeles Times, Aspergers Weekly and the San Francisco Chronicle.

== Books ==
Suits has illustrated scientific journals and textbooks. As a certified medical illustrator and forensic sculptor, she reconstructed the head of an Egyptian mummy using CAT scan technology.

She created art for a book of idioms, I'm Not Hanging Noodles on Your Ears by Jag Bhalla (National Geographic, 2009), and other books showcasing her work include The Rejection Collection II, edited by Matt Diffee (Gallery, 2007), and Sex and Sensibility, edited by Liza Donnelly (Twelve, 2008).

She is the author of a non-fiction book, The Extraordinary Catalog of Peculiar Inventions: The Curious World of the Demoulin Brothers and Their Fraternal Lodge Prank Machines from Human Centipedes and Revolving Goats to Electric Carpets and Smoking Camels (Perigee, 2011).
