= Lillian Ross (journalist) =

American journalist and author (1918–2017)

- Born: Lillian Rosovsky; June 8, 1918; Syracuse, New York, U.S.
- Died: September 20, 2017 (aged 99); Manhattan, New York City, New York, U.S.
- Occupations: Journalist, author

Lillian Ross (June 8, 1918 – September 20, 2017) was an American journalist and author, who was a staff writer at The New Yorker for seven decades, beginning in 1945. Her novelistic reporting and writing style, shown in early stories about Ernest Hemingway and John Huston, are considered a primary influence on what would later be called New Journalism or literary journalism. She died months before her 100th birthday.

== Biography ==
Ross was born Lillian Rosovsky in Syracuse, New York, in 1918. She was raised in Syracuse and Brooklyn, the youngest of three children of Louis and Edna (née Rosenson) Rosovsky. Her elder siblings were Helen and Simeon. During most of her career at The New Yorker she conducted an affair with its longtime editor William Shawn. Following the death of J. D. Salinger, she wrote in The New Yorker’s "The Talk of the Town" section of her long friendship with Salinger and showed photographs of him and his family with her family, including her adopted son, Erik (born 1965).

== Death ==
Ross died from a stroke in Manhattan on September 20, 2017, at the age of 99.

== Bibliography ==
=== Books ===
- Picture (account of the making of the film The Red Badge of Courage, originally published in The New Yorker), Rinehart (New York City), 1952, Anchor Books (New York City), 1993.
- Portrait of Hemingway (originally published as a "Profile" in The New Yorker, May 13, 1950), Simon & Schuster (New York City), 1961.
- (With sister, Helen Ross) The Player: A Profile of an Art (interviews), Simon & Schuster, 1962, Limelight Editions, 1984.
- Vertical and Horizontal (novel based on stories originally published in The New Yorker), Simon & Schuster, 1963.
- Reporting (articles originally published in The New Yorker, including "The Yellow Bus," "Symbol of All We Possess," "The Big Stone," "Terrific," "El Unico Matador," "Portrait of Hemingway," and "Picture"), Simon & Schuster, 1964, with new introduction by the author, Dodd (New York City), 1981.
- Talk Stories (sixty stories first published in "The Talk of the Town" section of The New Yorker, 1958–65), Simon & Schuster, 1966.
- Adlai Stevenson, Lippincott (Philadelphia), 1966.
- Reporting Two, Simon & Schuster, 1969.
- Moments with Chaplin, Dodd, 1980.
- Takes: Stories from "The Talk of the Town", Congdon & Weed (New York City), 1983.
- Here but Not Here: A Love Story (memoir), Random House, 1998.
- Reporting Back: Notes on Journalism, Counterpoint (New York), 2002.
- Reporting Always: Writing for The New Yorker (non-fiction), Scribner, November 2015.

=== Essays and reporting ===
- Ross, Lillian (January 7, 1950). "The millionaire - I". Profiles. The New Yorker. Vol. 25, no. 46. pp. 30–41.
- — (February 4, 1950). "The Talk of the Town: The Wildest People". The New Yorker. Vol. 25, no. 50. pp. 21–22. Talk piece on Transit Radio, Inc.
- — (February 8, 2010). "'Remembrance' bearable". The Talk of the Town. The New Yorker. pp. 22–23.
- — (April 4, 2011). "Good morning, Baghdad". The Talk of the Town. The Boards. The New Yorker. Vol. 87, no. 7. pp. 22–23.
