= The New Yorker =

American weekly magazine

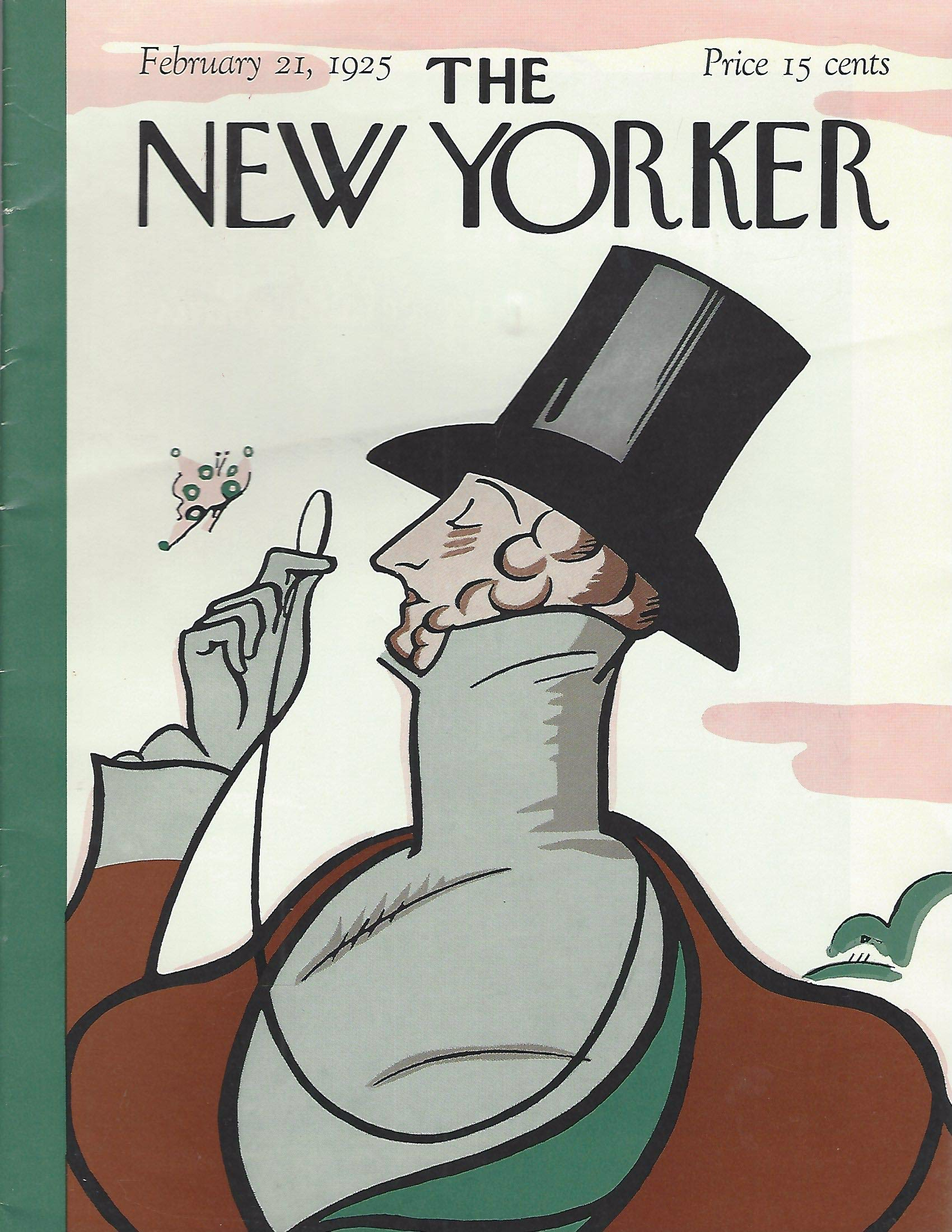
- Cover of the first issue from February 21, 1925, featuring the dandy figure of Eustace Tilley, created by Rea Irvin (Note: The caricature, or a variation of it, appeared on the cover of every anniversary issue until 2017, when, in protest of Executive Order 13769, Tilley was not depicted (although a variation appeared two issues later).)
- Editor: David Remnick
- Categories: Politics; social issues; short fiction; humor; culture
- Frequency: 47 issues/year
- Format: 7 7/8 by 10 3/4 inches (200 mm × 273 mm)
- Publisher: Condé Nast
- Total circulation: 1,320,390 (Oct. 2025)
- First issue: February 21, 1925; 101 years ago
- Company: Advance Publications
- Country: United States
- Based in: New York City
- Language: English
- Website: www.newyorker.com
- ISSN: 0028-792X (print); 2163-3827 (web)
- OCLC: 320541675

The New Yorker is an American magazine featuring journalism, commentary, criticism, essays, fiction, satire, cartoons, and poetry. It was founded on February 21, 1925, by Harold Ross and his wife Jane Grant, a reporter for The New York Times. Together with entrepreneur Raoul H. Fleischmann, they established the F-R Publishing Company and set up the magazine's first office in Manhattan. Ross remained the editor until his death in 1951, shaping the magazine's editorial tone and standards, such as its robust fact-checking operation, for which The New Yorker is widely recognized.

Although its reviews and events listings often focused on the cultural life of New York City, The New Yorker gained a reputation for publishing serious essays, long-form journalism, well-regarded fiction, and humor for a national and international audience, including work by writers such as Truman Capote, Vladimir Nabokov, and Alice Munro. In the late 20th and early 21st centuries, the magazine adapted to the digital era, maintaining its traditional print operations while expanding its online presence, including making its archives available on the Internet and introducing a digital version of the magazine. David Remnick has been the editor of The New Yorker since 1998.

The New Yorker is published 47 times annually, with five of these issues covering two-week spans. It is well known for its illustrated and often topical covers, such as View of the World from 9th Avenue, its commentaries on popular culture and eccentric American culture, its attention to modern fiction by the inclusion of short stories and literary reviews, its rigorous fact checking and copy editing, its investigative journalism and reporting on politics and social issues, and its single-panel cartoons reproduced throughout each issue. According to a 2012 Pew Research Center study, The New Yorker, along with The Atlantic and Harper's Magazine, ranked highest in college-educated readership among major American media outlets. It has won eleven Pulitzer Prizes since 2014, the first year magazines became eligible for the prize.

== Overview and history ==
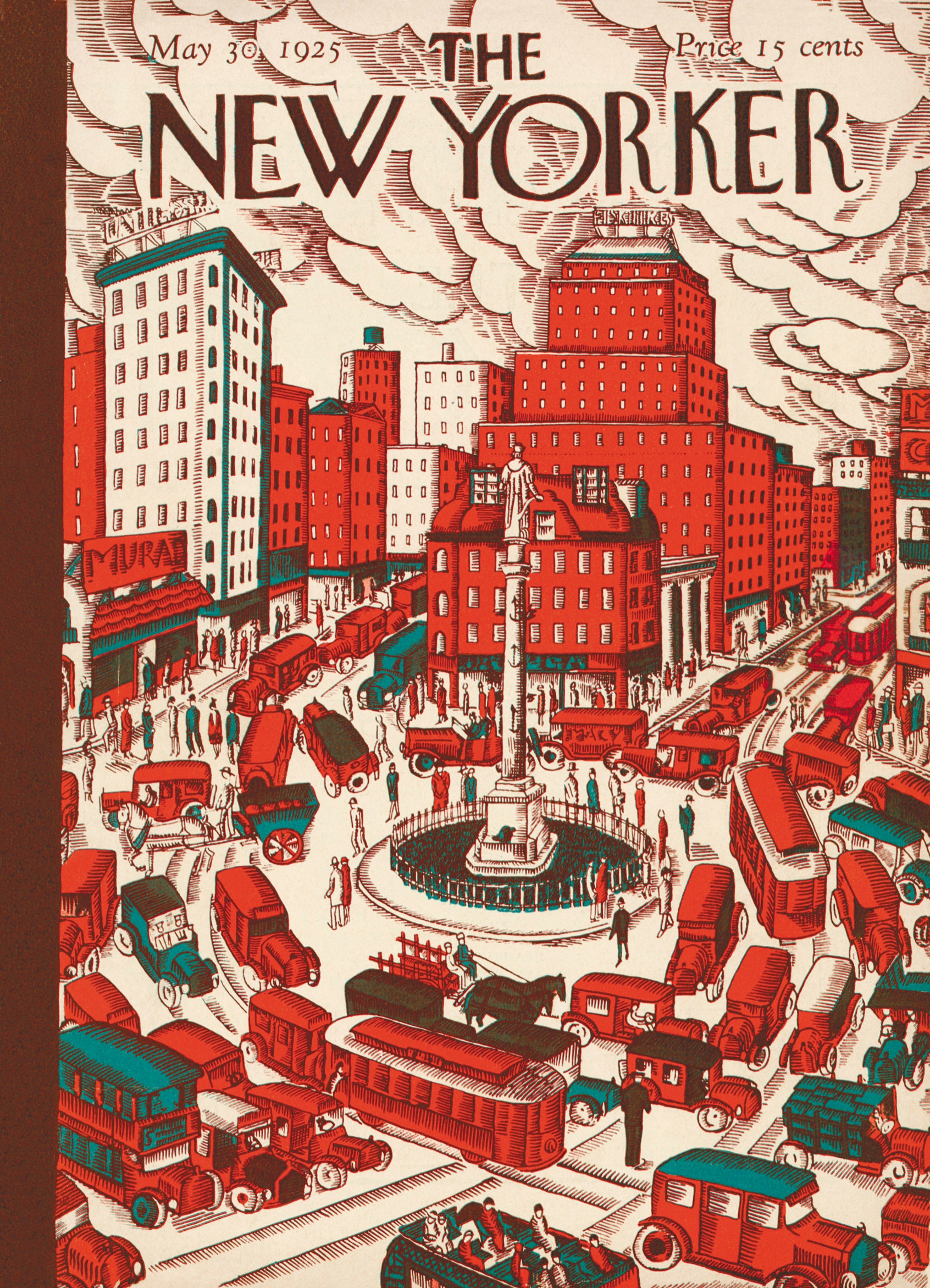
Cover of the issue from May 30, 1925, illustrated by Ilonka Karasz, a regular cover artist for The New Yorker

The New Yorker was founded by Harold Ross (1892–1951) and his wife Jane Grant (1892–1972), a New York Times reporter, and debuted on February 21, 1925. Ross wanted to create a sophisticated humor magazine that would be different from perceivably "corny" humor publications, such as Judge, where he had worked, or the old Life. Ross partnered with entrepreneur Raoul H. Fleischmann (who founded the General Baking Company) to establish the F-R Publishing Company. The magazine's first offices were at 25 West 45th Street in Manhattan. Ross edited the magazine until his death in 1951. During the early, occasionally precarious years of its existence, the magazine prided itself on its cosmopolitan sophistication. Ross declared in a 1925 prospectus for the magazine: "It has announced that it is not edited for the old lady in Dubuque".

Although the magazine never lost its touches of humor, it soon established itself as a preeminent forum for serious fiction, essays and journalism. Shortly after the end of World War II, John Hersey's essay Hiroshima filled an entire issue. The magazine has published short stories by many of the most respected writers of the 20th and 21st centuries, including Ann Beattie, Sally Benson, Maeve Brennan, Truman Capote, Rachel Carson, John Cheever, Roald Dahl, Mavis Gallant, Geoffrey Hellman, Ernest Hemingway, Stephen King, Ruth McKenney, John McNulty, Joseph Mitchell, Lorrie Moore, Alice Munro, Haruki Murakami, Vladimir Nabokov, John O'Hara, Dorothy Parker, S.J. Perelman, Philip Roth, George Saunders, J. D. Salinger, Irwin Shaw, James Thurber, John Updike, Eudora Welty, and E. B. White. Publication of Shirley Jackson's "The Lottery" drew more mail than any other story in the magazine's history.

The nonfiction feature articles (usually the bulk of an issue) cover an eclectic array of topics. Subjects have included eccentric evangelist Creflo Dollar, the different ways in which humans perceive the passage of time, and Münchausen syndrome by proxy. The magazine is known for its editorial traditions. Under the rubric Profiles, it has published articles about prominent people such as Ernest Hemingway, Henry R. Luce, Marlon Brando, Hollywood restaurateur Michael Romanoff, magician Ricky Jay, and mathematicians David and Gregory Chudnovsky. Other enduring features have been "Goings on About Town", a listing of cultural and entertainment events in New York, and "The Talk of the Town", a feuilleton or miscellany of brief pieces—frequently humorous, whimsical, or eccentric vignettes of life in New York—in a breezily light style, although latterly the section often begins with a serious commentary. For many years, newspaper snippets containing amusing errors, unintended meanings or badly mixed metaphors ("Block That Metaphor") have been used as filler items, accompanied by a witty retort. There is no masthead listing the editors and staff. Despite some changes, the magazine has kept much of its traditional appearance over the decades in typography, layout, covers, and artwork. The magazine was acquired by Advance Publications, the media company owned by Samuel Irving Newhouse Jr, in 1985, for $200 million when it was earning less than $6 million a year.

Ross was succeeded as editor by William Shawn (1951–1987), followed by Robert Gottlieb (1987–1992) and Tina Brown (1992–1998). The current editor of The New Yorker is David Remnick, who succeeded Brown in July 1998.

Among the important nonfiction authors who began writing for the magazine during Shawn's editorship were Dwight Macdonald, Kenneth Tynan, and Hannah Arendt, whose Eichmann in Jerusalem reportage appeared in the magazine, before it was published as a book.

Brown's tenure attracted more controversy than Gottlieb's or even Shawn's, due to her high profile (Shawn, by contrast, had been an extremely shy, introverted figure), and to the changes she made to a magazine with a similar look for the previous half-century. She introduced color to the editorial pages (several years before The New York Times) and included photography, with less type on each page and a generally more modern layout. More substantively, she increased the coverage of current events and topics such as celebrities and business tycoons, and placed short pieces throughout "Goings on About Town", including a racy column about nightlife in Manhattan.

Since the late 1990s, The New Yorker has used the Internet to publish current and archived material, and maintains a website with some content from the current issue (plus exclusive web-only content). Subscribers have access to the full current issue online and a complete archive of back issues viewable as they were originally printed. In addition, The New Yorker's cartoons are available for purchase online. In 2014, The New Yorker opened up online access to its archive, expanded its plans to run an ambitious website, and launched a paywalled subscription model. Web editor Nicholas Thompson said, "What we're trying to do is to make a website that is to the Internet what the magazine is to all other magazines". The magazine's complete archive was fully digitized in 2025, as part of its centenary publishing efforts.

The magazine's editorial staff unionized in 2018 and The New Yorker Union signed its first collective bargaining agreement in 2021.

=== Influence and significance ===
The New Yorker influenced a number of similar magazines, including The Brooklynite (1926 to 1930), The Chicagoan (1926 to 1935), and Paris's The Boulevardier (1927 to 1932).

Kurt Vonnegut said that The New Yorker has been an effective instrument for getting a large audience to appreciate modern literature. Tom Wolfe wrote of the magazine: "The New Yorker style was one of leisurely meandering understatement, droll when in the humorous mode, tautological and litotical when in the serious mode, constantly amplified, qualified, adumbrated upon, nuanced and renuanced, until the magazine's pale-gray pages became High Baroque triumphs of the relative clause and appository modifier".

Joseph Rosenblum, reviewing Ben Yagoda's About Town, a history of the magazine from 1925 to 1985, wrote, "The New Yorker did create its own universe. As one longtime reader wrote to Yagoda, this was a place 'where Peter DeVries ... [sic] was forever lifting a glass of Piesporter, where Niccolò Tucci (in a plum velvet dinner jacket) flirted in Italian with Muriel Spark, where Nabokov sipped tawny port from a prismatic goblet (while a Red Admirable perched on his pinky), and where John Updike tripped over the master's Swiss shoes, excusing himself charmingly'".

=== United States presidential election endorsements ===
On November 1, 2004, the magazine endorsed a presidential candidate for the first time, choosing Democratic nominee John Kerry over incumbent Republican George W. Bush.

Year	Endorsement	Result	Other major candidate(s)	Ref.
2004	John Kerry	Lost	George W. Bush	
2008	Barack Obama	Won	John McCain	
2012	Barack Obama	Won	Mitt Romney	
2016	Hillary Clinton	Lost	Donald Trump	
2020	Joe Biden	Won	Donald Trump	
2024	Kamala Harris	Lost	Donald Trump	

== Cartoons ==
The New Yorker has featured cartoons (usually gag cartoons) since it began publication in 1925. For years, its cartoon editor was Lee Lorenz, who first began cartooning in 1956 and became a New Yorker contract contributor in 1958. After serving as the magazine's art editor from 1973 to 1993 (when he was replaced by Françoise Mouly), he continued in the position of cartoon editor until 1998. His book The Art of the New Yorker: 1925–1995 (Knopf, 1995) was the first comprehensive survey of all aspects of the magazine's graphics. In 1998, Robert Mankoff took over as cartoon editor and edited at least 14 collections of New Yorker cartoons. Mankoff also usually contributed a short article to each book, describing some aspect of the cartooning process or the methods used to select cartoons for the magazine. He left the magazine in 2017.

The New Yorker's stable of cartoonists has included many important talents in American humor, including Charles Addams, Peter Arno, Charles Barsotti, George Booth, Roz Chast, Tom Cheney, Sam Cobean, Leo Cullum, Richard Decker, Pia Guerra, J. B. Handelsman, Helen E. Hokinson, Pete Holmes, Ed Koren, Reginald Marsh, Mary Petty, George Price, Charles Saxon, Burr Shafer, Otto Soglow, William Steig, Saul Steinberg, James Stevenson, James Thurber, and Gahan Wilson.

Many early New Yorker cartoonists did not caption their cartoons. In his book The Years with Ross, Thurber describes the newspaper's weekly art meeting, where cartoons submitted over the previous week were brought up from the mail room to be looked over by Ross, the editorial department, and a number of staff writers. Cartoons were often rejected or sent back to artists with requested amendments, while others were accepted and captions were written for them. Some artists hired their own writers; Hokinson hired James Reid Parker in 1931. Brendan Gill relates in his book Here at The New Yorker that at one point in the early 1940s, the quality of the artwork submitted to the magazine seemed to improve. It later was found out that the office boy (a teenaged Truman Capote) had been acting as a volunteer art editor, dropping pieces he did not like down the far end of his desk.

Several of the magazine's cartoons have reached a higher plateau of fame. One 1928 cartoon drawn by Carl Rose and captioned by E. B. White shows a mother telling her daughter, "It's broccoli, dear". The daughter responds, "I say it's spinach and I say the hell with it". The phrase "I say it's spinach" entered the vernacular, and three years later, the Broadway musical Face the Music included Irving Berlin's song "I Say It's Spinach (And the Hell with It)". The catchphrase "back to the drawing board" originated with the 1941 Peter Arno cartoon showing an engineer walking away from a crashed plane, saying, "Well, back to the old drawing board".

The most reprinted is Peter Steiner's 1993 drawing of two dogs at a computer, with one saying, "On the Internet, nobody knows you're a dog". According to Mankoff, Steiner and the magazine have split more than $100,000 in fees paid for the licensing and reprinting of this single cartoon, with more than half going to Steiner.

Over seven decades, many hardcover compilations of New Yorker cartoons have been published, and in 2004, Mankoff edited The Complete Cartoons of The New Yorker, a 656-page collection with 2,004 of the magazine's best cartoons published during 80 years, plus a double CD set with all 68,647 cartoons ever published in the magazine. This features a search function allowing readers to search for cartoons by cartoonist's name or year of publication. The newer group of cartoonists in recent years includes Pat Byrnes, J. C. Duffy, Liana Finck, Emily Flake, Robert Leighton, Michael Maslin, Julia Suits, and P. C. Vey. Will McPhail cited his beginnings as "just ripping off Calvin and Hobbes, Bill Watterson, and doing little dot eyes". The notion that some New Yorker cartoons have punchlines so oblique as to be impenetrable became a subplot in the Seinfeld episode "The Cartoon", as well as a playful jab in The Simpsons episode "The Sweetest Apu".

In April 2005, the magazine began using the last page of each issue for "The New Yorker Cartoon Caption Contest". Captionless cartoons by The New Yorker's regular cartoonists are printed each week. Captions are submitted by readers, and three are chosen as finalists. Readers then vote on the winner. Anyone age 13 or older can enter or vote. At first, the winner received a print of the cartoon (with the winning caption) signed by the artist who drew the cartoon, but this practice ceased. In 2017, after Bob Mankoff left the magazine, Emma Allen became its youngest and first female cartoon editor.

=== Comics journalism ===
Since 1993, the magazine has published occasional stories of comics journalism (alternately called "sketchbook reports") by such cartoonists as Marisa Acocella Marchetto, Barry Blitt, Sue Coe, Robert Crumb and Aline Kominsky-Crumb, Jules Feiffer, Ben Katchor, Carol Lay, Gary Panter, Art Spiegelman, Mark Alan Stamaty, and Ronald Wimberly.

== Crosswords and puzzles ==
In April 2018, The New Yorker launched a crossword puzzle series with a weekday crossword published every Monday. Subsequently, it launched a second, weekend crossword that appears on Fridays and relaunched cryptic puzzles that were run in the magazine in the late 1990s. In June 2021, it began publishing new cryptics weekly. In July 2021, The New Yorker introduced Name Drop, a trivia game, which is posted online weekdays. In March 2022, The New Yorker moved to publishing online crosswords every weekday, with decreasing difficulty Monday through Thursday and themed puzzles on Fridays. The puzzles are written by a rotating stable of 13 constructors. They integrate cartoons into the solving experience. The Christmas 2019 issue featured a crossword puzzle by Patrick Berry that had cartoons as clues, with the answers being captions for the cartoons. In December 2019, Liz Maynes-Aminzade was named The New Yorker's first puzzles and games editor.

== Eustace Tilley ==
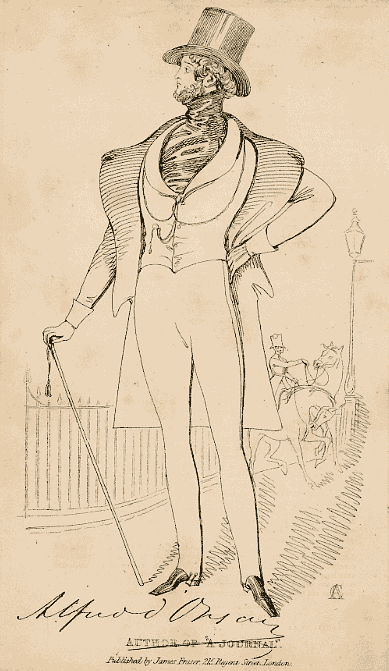
Image of Alfred d'Orsay (1801–1852), published by James Fraser (1783–1856)

The magazine's first cover illustration, depicting a dandy peering at a butterfly through a monocle, was drawn by Rea Irvin, the magazine's first art editor. It was based on an 1834 caricature of the Count d'Orsay that appeared as an illustration in the 11th edition of the Encyclopædia Britannica. The character on the original cover, now known as Eustace Tilley, was created for The New Yorker by Corey Ford. The hero of a series titled "The Making of a Magazine", which began on the inside front cover of the August 8 issue that first summer, Tilley was a younger man than the figure on the original cover. His top hat was of a newer style, without the curved brim. He wore a morning coat and striped formal trousers. Ford borrowed Eustace Tilley's last name from an aunt—he had always found it vaguely humorous. He selected "Eustace" for euphony.

The character has become a kind of mascot for The New Yorker, frequently appearing in its pages and on promotional materials. Traditionally, Irvin's original Tilley cover illustration is used every year on the issue closest to the anniversary date of February 21, though on several occasions a newly drawn variation has been substituted.

== Covers ==
The magazine is known for its illustrated and often topical covers. As of 2025, only two covers have featured photography.

=== "View of the World" cover ===
Saul Steinberg created 85 covers and 642 internal drawings and illustrations for the magazine. His most famous work is probably the cover for issue March 29, 1976, featuring an illustration, most often called "View of the World from 9th Avenue", sometimes called "A Parochial New Yorker's View of the World" or "A New Yorker's View of the World", which depicts a map of the world as seen by self-absorbed New Yorkers.

The illustration is split in two, with the bottom half showing Manhattan's 9th Avenue, 10th Avenue, and the Hudson River, and the top half depicting the rest of the world. The rest of the US is the size of the three New York City blocks and is drawn as a square, with a thin brown strip along the Hudson representing "Jersey", the names of five cities (Los Angeles; Washington, D.C.; Las Vegas; Kansas City; and Chicago) and three states (Texas, Utah, and Nebraska) scattered among a few rocks for the U.S. beyond New Jersey. The Pacific Ocean, perhaps half again as wide as the Hudson, separates the US from three flattened land masses labeled China, Japan and Russia.

The illustration—depicting New Yorkers' self-image of their place in the world, or perhaps outsiders' view of New Yorkers' self-image—inspired many similar works, including the poster for the 1984 film Moscow on the Hudson; that movie poster led to a lawsuit, Steinberg v. Columbia Pictures Industries, Inc., 663 F. Supp. 706 (S.D.N.Y. 1987), which held that Columbia Pictures violated the copyright that Steinberg held.

The cover was later satirized by Barry Blitt for the cover of The New Yorker on October 6, 2008, featuring Sarah Palin looking out of her window seeing only Alaska, with Russia in the far background. The cover of the March 21, 2009, issue of The Economist, titled "How China sees the World", is an homage to Steinberg, depicting the viewpoint from Beijing's Chang'an Avenue instead of Manhattan.

=== 9/11 ===
Hired by Tina Brown in 1992, Art Spiegelman worked for The New Yorker for ten years, but resigned a few months after the September 11 terrorist attacks. Spiegelman and Françoise Mouly received wide acclaim for their cover for the issue from September 24, 2001; it was voted as being among the top ten magazine covers of the past 40 years by the American Society of Magazine Editors:

New Yorker Covers Editor Françoise Mouly repositioned Art Spiegelman's silhouettes, inspired by Ad Reinhardt's black-on-black paintings, so that the North Tower's antenna breaks the "W" of the magazine's logo. Spiegelman wanted to see the emptiness, and find the awful/awe-filled image of all that disappeared on 9/11. The silhouetted Twin Towers were printed in a fifth, black ink, on a field of black made up of the standard four color printing inks. An overprinted clear varnish helps create the ghost images that linger, insisting on their presence through the blackness.

The cover appears to be totally black, but upon close examination it reveals the silhouettes of the World Trade Center towers in a darker shade of black. In some situations, the ghost images become visible only when the magazine is tilted toward a light source. In September 2004, Spiegelman reprised the image on the cover of his book In the Shadow of No Towers.

=== "New Yorkistan" ===
In December 2001, the magazine printed a cover by Maira Kalman and Rick Meyerowitz showing a map of New York in which neighborhoods are labeled with humorous names reminiscent of Middle Eastern and Central Asian place names and referencing the neighborhood's real name or characteristics (e.g., "Fuhgeddabouditstan", "Botoxia"). The cover had cultural resonance in the wake of September 11, and became a popular print and poster.

=== Controversial covers ===
==== Crown Heights in 1993 ====
For the 1993 Valentine's Day issue, the cover by Spiegelman depicted a black woman and a Hasidic Jewish man kissing, referencing the Crown Heights riot of 1991. The cover was criticized by black and Jewish observers. Jack Salzman and Cornel West called reaction to the cover the magazine's "first national controversy".

==== 2008 Obama cover satire and controversy ====
Barry Blitt's New Yorker cover from July 21, 2008

On July 21, 2008, "The Politics of Fear", a cartoon by Barry Blitt, was featured on the cover of The New Yorker, depicting then presumptive Democratic presidential nominee Barack Obama in the turban and shalwar kameez typical of many Muslims, fist bumping with his wife, Michelle, portrayed with an Afro and wearing camouflage trousers with an assault rifle slung over her back. They are standing in the Oval Office, with a portrait of Osama bin Laden hanging on the wall and an American flag burning in the fireplace. This parody was inspired by Fox News host E. D. Hill's paraphrase of an internet comment that asked whether a gesture the Obamas made was a "terrorist fist jab". Later, Hill's contract was not renewed.

Many New Yorker readers saw the image as a lampoon of "The Politics of Fear", its title. Some Obama supporters, as well as his presumptive Republican opponent, John McCain, accused the magazine of publishing an incendiary cartoon whose irony could be lost on some readers. Editor David Remnick felt the image's obvious excesses rebuffed the concern it could be misunderstood. "The intent of the cover", he said, "is to satirize the vicious and racist attacks and rumors and misconceptions about the Obamas that have been floating around in the blogosphere and are reflected in public opinion polls. What we set out to do was to throw all these images together, which are all over the top and to shine a kind of harsh light on them, to satirize them." Obama said, "Well, I know it was The New Yorker's attempt at satire... I don't think they were entirely successful". He pointed to his efforts to debunk the allegations the cover depicted, saying that the allegations were "actually an insult against Muslim-Americans". The Daily Show continued The New Yorker cover's argument about Obama stereotypes with a piece showcasing clips containing such stereotypes culled from legitimate news sources. On October 3, 2008, Entertainment Weekly magazine published a parody of the cover, featuring Jon Stewart as Barack and Stephen Colbert as Michelle.

New Yorker covers are sometimes unrelated to the contents, or only tangentially related. The article about Obama in the issue with Blitt's cover did not discuss the attacks and rumors, but rather Obama's career. The magazine later endorsed Obama for president.

==== 2013 Bert and Ernie cover ====
On July 8, 2013, The New Yorker featured a cover image by artist Jack Hunter, titled "Moment of Joy", depicting Sesame Street characters Bert and Ernie; the issue in particular covered the Supreme Court decisions on the Defense of Marriage Act and California Proposition 8. Bert and Ernie have long been rumored in urban legend to be romantic partners, but Sesame Workshop has denied this, saying they are merely "puppets" and have no sexual orientation. Slate criticized the cover, which shows Ernie leaning on Bert's shoulder as they watch a television with the Supreme Court justices on the screen, saying, "it's a terrible way to commemorate a major civil-rights victory for gay and lesbian couples". The Huffington Post, meanwhile, said it was "one of [the magazine's] most awesome covers of all time".

==== 2023 "Race for Office" cover ====
The cover from October 2, 2023, titled "The Race for Office", depicts top politicians—Donald Trump, Mitch McConnell, Nancy Pelosi, and Joe Biden—running the titular race for office with walkers. Many had questioned the mental and physical states of these and other older politicians, particularly those who have run for reelection. While many acknowledged the cover as satirizing this issue, others criticized the "ableism and ageism" of mocking older people and those who use walkers. The New Yorker said the cover "portrays the irony and absurdity of the advanced-age politicians currently vying for our top offices".

== Style ==
The New Yorker's signature display typeface, used for its nameplate and headlines and the masthead above "The Talk of the Town" section, is named Irvin, named after its creator, the designer-illustrator Rea Irvin. The body text of all articles is set in Adobe Caslon.

One uncommonly formal feature of the magazine's in-house style is the placement of diaeresis marks in words with repeating vowels—such as reëlected, preëminent, and coöperate—in which the two vowel letters indicate separate vowel sounds. The magazine also continues to use a few spellings that are otherwise little used in American English, such as fuelled, focussed, venders, teen-ager, traveller, marvellous, carrousel, and cannister.

The magazine also spells out the names of numerical amounts, such as "two million three hundred thousand dollars" instead of "$2.3 million", even for very large figures.

== Fact-checking ==
In 1927, The New Yorker ran an article about Edna St. Vincent Millay that contained multiple factual errors, and her mother threatened to sue the publication for libel. Consequently, the magazine developed extensive fact-checking procedures, which became integral to its reputation as early as the 1940s. In 2019, the Columbia Journalism Review said that "no publication has been more consistently identified with its rigorous fact-checking". As of 2025, about 30 people work in the fact-checking department.

At least two defamation lawsuits have been filed over articles published in the magazine, though neither were won by the plaintiff. Two 1983 articles by Janet Malcolm about Sigmund Freud's legacy led to a lawsuit from writer Jeffrey Moussaieff Masson, who claimed that Malcolm had fabricated quotes attributed to him. After years of proceedings and appeals, a jury found in Malcolm's favor in 1994. In 2010, David Grann wrote an article for the magazine about art expert Peter Paul Biro that scrutinized and expressed skepticism about Biro's stated methods to identify forgeries. Biro sued The New Yorker for defamation, alongside multiple other news outlets that reported on the article, but the case was summarily dismissed.

== Readership ==
According to a 2009 survey-based estimate of magazine audiences by MediaMark Research, the average New Yorker reader was 47.8 years old, with a household income of $91,359. In the same period, the average household income in the United States was $58,898.

Politically, the magazine's readership holds generally liberal views. According to a 2014 Pew Research Center survey, 77% of The New Yorker's readers have left-of-center political values, and 52% of them hold "consistently liberal" political values.

== List of books about The New Yorker ==
- Ross and The New Yorker by Dale Kramer (1951)
- The Years with Ross by James Thurber (1959)
- Ross, The New Yorker and Me by Jane Grant (1968)
- Here at The New Yorker by Brendan Gill (1975)
- About the New Yorker and Me by E.J. Kahn (1979)
- Onward and Upward: A Biography of Katharine S. White by Linda H. Davis (1987)
- At Seventy: More about The New Yorker and Me by E. J. Kahn (1988)
- Katharine and E. B. White: An Affectionate Memoir by Isabel Russell (1988)
- The Last Days of The New Yorker by Gigi Mahon (1989)
- The Smart Magazines: Fifty Years of Literary Revelry and High Jinks at Vanity Fair, the New Yorker, Life, Esquire, and the Smart Set by George H. Douglas (1991)
- Genius in Disguise: Harold Ross of the New Yorker by Thomas Kunkel (1997)
- Here But Not Here: My Life with William Shawn and The New Yorker by Lillian Ross (1998)
- Remembering Mr. Shawn's New Yorker: The Invisible Art of Editing by Ved Mehta (1998)
- Some Times in America: And a Life in a Year at The New Yorker by Alexander Chancellor (1999)
- The World Through a Monocle: The New Yorker at Midcentury by Mary F. Corey (1999)
- About Town: The New Yorker and the World It Made by Ben Yagoda (2000)
- Covering the New Yorker: Cutting-Edge Covers from a Literary Institution by Françoise Mouly (2000)
- Defining New Yorker Humor by Judith Yaross Lee (2000)
- Gone: The Last Days of The New Yorker, by Renata Adler (2000)
- Letters from the Editor: The New Yorker's Harold Ross edited by Thomas Kunkel (2000; letters covering the years 1917 to 1951)
- New Yorker Profiles 1925–1992: A Bibliography compiled by Gail Shivel (2000)
- NoBrow: The Culture of Marketing – the Marketing of Culture by John Seabrook (2000)
- Fierce Pajamas: An Anthology of Humor Writing from The New Yorker by David Remnick and Henry Finder (2002)
- Christmas at The New Yorker: Stories, Poems, Humor, and Art (2003)
- A Life of Privilege, Mostly by Gardner Botsford (2003)
- Maeve Brennan: Homesick at The New Yorker by Angela Bourke (2004)
- Better than Sane by Alison Rose(2004)
- Let Me Finish by Roger Angell (Harcourt, 2006)
- The Receptionist: An Education at The New Yorker by Janet Groth (2012)
- My Mistake: A Memoir by Daniel Menaker (2013)
- Between You & Me: Confessions of a Comma Queen by Mary Norris (2015)
- Cast of Characters: Wolcott Gibbs, E. B. White, James Thurber and the Golden Age of The New Yorker by Thomas Vinciguerra (2015)
- Peter Arno: The Mad, Mad World of The New Yorker's Greatest Cartoonist by Michael Maslin (2016)
- The World She Edited: Katharine S. White at The New Yorker by Amy Reading (2024)
- Irish Writers and The New Yorker in the Mid-Twentieth Century by Yen-Chi Wu (2026)

== The New Yorker in film ==
The New Yorker and its history have served as the source of inspiration for multiple films, and many of its fiction and nonfiction pieces have been adapted for the big screen. The New Yorker also distributes short films as part of its Screening Room series, which frequently compete for Academy Awards.

=== Films about The New Yorker ===
In Mrs. Parker and the Vicious Circle, a film about the Algonquin Round Table starring Jennifer Jason Leigh as Dorothy Parker, Sam Robards portrays founding editor Harold Ross trying to drum up support for his fledgling publication.

The magazine's former editor, William Shawn, is portrayed in Capote (2005), Infamous (2006), and Hannah Arendt (2012).

The 2015 documentary Very Semi-Serious, directed by Leah Wolchok and produced by Wolchok and Davina Pardo (Redora Films), presents a behind-the-scenes look at the cartoons of The New Yorker.

=== List of films about The New Yorker ===
- Mrs. Parker and the Vicious Circle (1994)
- James Thurber: The Life and Hard Times (2000)
- Joe Gould's Secret (2000)
- Top Hat and Tales: Harold Ross and the Making of the New Yorker (2001)
- Very Semi-Serious (2015)
- The New Yorker at 100 (2025), a documentary about the magazine's centenary
- Wes Anderson's The French Dispatch (2021) is an overt homage to the magazine; the film consists of several long-form "stories", all in the style of various New Yorker contributors.

=== Films based on New Yorker content ===
Numerous notable films have been adapted from pieces that first appeared in The New Yorker, including Brokeback Mountain (2005), an adaptation of E. Annie Proulx's short story in the October 13, 1997, issue; The Hours (2002), an adaptation of Michael Cunningham's 1998 novel of the same name, which was excerpted in The New Yorker; and Adaptation (2002), which Charlie Kaufman based on Susan Orlean's The Orchid Thief, itself adapted from a New Yorker article.

List of films based on New Yorker articles
Year	Title	Director	Original article; Issue date
2026	Coyote vs. Acme	Dave Green	"Coyote v. Acme", by Ian Frazier; February 26, 1990
2022	Spiderhead	Joseph Kosinski	"Escape from Spiderhead", by George Saunders; December 20 & 27, 2010
2013	The Secret Life of Walter Mitty ^{1}	Ben Stiller	"The Secret Life of Walter Mitty" by James Thurber; March 11, 1939
2008	Flash of Genius	Marc Abraham	"The Flash of Genius" by John Seabrook; January 11, 1993
2006	Away from Her	Sarah Polley	"The Bear Came Over the Mountain" by Alice Munro; December 27, 1999
2006	The Namesake	Mira Nair	"Gogol" by Jhumpa Lahiri; June 16, 2003
2006	The Bridge ^{2}	Eric Steel	"Jumpers" by Tad Friend; October 13, 2003
2005	Brokeback Mountain	Ang Lee	"Brokeback Mountain" by Annie Proulx; October 13, 1997
2005	Everything is Illuminated	Liev Schreiber	"The Very Rigid Search" by Jonathan Safran Foer; June 18, 2001
2002	The Hours	Stephen Daldry	"A Room at the Normandy" by Michael Cunningham; September 21, 1998
2002	Adaptation	Spike Jonze	"Orchid Fever" by Susan Orlean; January 23, 1995
2001	Iris	Richard Eyre	"Elegy for Iris" by John Bayley; July 27, 1998
1999	Angela's Ashes	Alan Parker	"Sorry for Your Troubles" by Frank McCourt; June 10, 1996
1999	Boys Don't Cry	Kimberly Peirce	"The Humboldt Murders" by John Gregory Dunne; January 13, 1997
1991	The Addams Family ^{3}	Barry Sonnenfeld	various works by Charles Addams
1989	Casualties of War	Brian de Palma	"Casualties of War" by Daniel Lang; October 18, 1969
1968	The Swimmer	Frank Perry	"The Swimmer" by John Cheever; July 18, 1964
1967	In Cold Blood	Richard Brooks	"In Cold Blood" by Truman Capote; September 25, 1965 (serialized, in four parts)
1957	Pal Joey	George Sidney	"Pal Joey" by John O'Hara; October 22, 1938 (and other short stories)
1950	Mister 880	Edmund Goulding	"Old Eight Eighty" by St. Clair McKelway; August 27, 1949 (serialized, in three parts)
1944	Meet Me in St. Louis	Vincente Minnelli	"5135 Kensington" by Sally Benson; June 14, 1941 (and other short stories)
1941	Junior Miss	George Seaton	"Junior Miss" by Sally Benson; October 28, 1939 (and other short stories)

Notes

1. Also a remake of the 1947 film of the same name.
2. Documentary
3. Also its sequel Addams Family Values (1993), and subsequent adaptations, including an animated film and the 2022 Netflix show Wednesday.

== See also ==
- List of The New Yorker contributors
- The New Yorker Festival
- The New Yorker Radio Hour, a radio program carried by public radio stations
