= Rod Blagojevich controversies =

American political controversies since 2005

A number of controversies related to Rod Blagojevich, a former governor of Illinois, were covered in the press during and after his administration. In addition to a reputation for secrecy that was noted by the Associated Press, Blagojevich was the subject of political, legal, and personal controversies similar to those of his predecessor, Republican Governor George Ryan. To the surprise of many, Blagojevich said in 2008 that he agreed with the idea of commuting Ryan's federal prison sentence.

== Feud with father-in-law ==
A major event of 2005 was Blagojevich's dispute with his father-in-law, Chicago Alderman Richard Mell. Although Blagojevich had been elected largely with Mell's help, the two had a contentious relationship since Blagojevich was elected governor. The feud went public in January 2005 when Blagojevich shut down a landfill owned by a distant cousin of his wife Patti for allegedly accepting waste it was not licensed to take, and it was revealed that Mell had served as an advisor to the cousin. A Cook County grand jury investigated whether Blagojevich's administration overstepped authority in closing the landfill. Legislation was eventually passed giving the Illinois Environmental Protection Agency more authority over landfills and preventing relatives of top Illinois officials from owning landfills. Mell said that Blagojevich "used me" and that he "uses everybody and then discards them."

Regarding his decision to shut down the landfill despite the fact the landfill was owned by a relative, Blagojevich said, "This is the kind of thing that I think frankly separates the men from the boys in leadership. Do you have the testicular virility to make a decision like that knowing what's coming your way? I say I do." This remark was both ridiculed as an undignified comment for a governor as well as criticized for being sexist.

Mell said publicly at the time that Blagojevich's chief fundraiser had traded state jobs for campaign contributions, but recanted after threat of a lawsuit.

== Federal investigations ==
Since 2005, Blagojevich has been the subject of at least a dozen separate federal investigations, involving accusations against at least 14 other people, including Blagojevich's former fundraiser Tony Rezko. In 2006, Blagojevich said that he has been targeted for investigation by "scoundrels" due to the change he brought as governor, such as his ethics reform bill.

On December 30, 2005, it was reported that a leasing deal reached for occupants of the rebuilt Illinois Tollway oasis had come under investigation by U.S. Attorney Patrick Fitzgerald. Those who signed the fast food contracts were reported to be connected to Blagojevich campaign fundraising. This was in addition to other investigations in the Illinois Department of Transportation, the Department of Corrections and the Department of Children and Family Services.

On June 30, 2006, it was revealed that state Attorney General Lisa Madigan had received a letter from United States Attorney Patrick Fitzgerald, stating that Fitzgerald is looking into "very serious allegations of endemic hiring fraud" in the Blagojevich administration, and thanking Madigan for turning over her office's investigation to the federal authorities.

In September 2006, news outlets began reporting that Blagojevich had accepted a $1,500 check from Mike Ascaridis, whom the governor described as one of his closest friends, in 2003. The check was given two weeks after Ascaridis' wife, Beverly, received a state job at the Illinois Department of Natural Resources. Beverly Ascaridis received this appointment despite having failed a state hiring exam. Blagojevich initially asserted that the check was written as a seventh birthday gift to his older daughter. He later said it was a gift for his younger daughter's christening. Then-U.S. Attorney Patrick Fitzgerald and the FBI investigated the matter, but Blagojevich was never charged in connection to it. In 2005, Beverly Ascaridis told investigators that she believed she had been hired in exchange for the check.

On October 2, 2006, the St. Louis Post-Dispatch reported that a company that contributed close to $120,000 to Blagojevich's 2002 gubernatorial campaign won a no-bid contract. Even though the contract was awarded by the Illinois' Capital Development Board, the board still reported to the governor.

Blagojevich was indicted by a federal grand jury in April 2009. On August 17, 2010, he was convicted on a charge of lying to the FBI, but a mistrial was ordered for the remaining 23 federal charges. On June 27, 2011, following another trial, he was found guilty of 17 charges. In 2020, after Blagojevich had been imprisoned for nearly eight years of his 14-year sentence, President Donald Trump commuted his sentence. On February 10, 2025, Trump pardoned him, clearing his criminal record.

== Tony Rezko indictment and trial ==
On October 11, 2006, Antonin "Tony" Rezko and Stuart Levine, both of whom were fundraisers for Blagojevich and Barack Obama, were indicted for participation in a scheme to obtain kickbacks from investment firms seeking business from two state boards. Levine pleaded guilty two weeks later and agreed to testify against Rezko.

Blagojevich's wife, Patricia Blagojevich, a licensed real estate broker, had Rezko as a client for at least a decade. In 2004, she received over $38,000 in commissions from Rezko's real estate transactions.

In October 2006, it was revealed that Patricia Blagojevich earned $113,700 in real estate commissions from Anita and Amrish Mahajan. These were the only commissions earned by Patricia Blagojevich that year. Anita Mahajan owned a urinalysis company that held a no-bid contract with the state Department of Children and Family Services. Amrish Mahajan was president of a bank that had two requests pending before state regulators to acquire two out-of-state banks.

In December 2007, Blagojevich campaign boss Christopher G. Kelly was indicted on federal charges of tax fraud. The charges against Kelly were not related to the governor or any political work. However, Kelly has been listed as a "co-schemer" in court filings related to the Rezko case. According to prosecutors, Kelly was involved in pressuring prospective state contractors for "finder's fees" or political contributions. At the time of Rezko's indictment, Blagojevich described his relationship with Kelly: "They're two different people, by the way, and it's a different relationship. Chris and I are much closer. Chris is the head of my political campaign. That's someone I talk to a lot more frequently." In January, 2009, Kelly, pleaded guilty to the tax charges, and in June, at 50, was sentenced to 37 months in prison, fined $7,500, and ordered to pay more than $600,000 in restitution. He was allowed to stay free on bail pending a September trial "in which he is charged with paying an unnamed consultant $450,000 in kickbacks to get $8.5 million in inflated roofing contracts from two airlines at O'Hare International Airport," according to a report. Prosecutors hoped that Kelly would yet testify on the workings of the Blagojevich administration.

Blagojevich was widely rumored to be the unnamed "Public Official A" mentioned in the Rezko indictment. The governor repeatedly denied that he was Public Official A, but on February 26, 2008, the judge in the case issued a ruling which confirmed his identity. A pretrial ruling in the case from U.S. District Judge Amy St. Eve named the Blagojevich campaign and confirmed that Blagojevich was the intended beneficiary of at least one of Rezko's extortion attempts. Blagojevich was not charged in the indictment, although prosecutors have asserted in other court filings that he told a top Democratic fundraiser that he could steer contracts, legal work and investment banking in order to help with fundraising.

During the Rezko trial, Blagojevich's name came up frequently - first during testimony from Levine, who testified of Rezko's influence with the governor. Blagojevich was not charged in the case, but prosecutors sought to prove that his top advisers were involved in widespread kickback schemes. Levine mentioned Blagojevich by name at least 30 times in one day of testimony, and said under oath that the governor told him, "[Y]ou stick with us and you'll do very well for yourself". Levine took the comment to mean that there was money to be made if he did the administration's bidding. A Blagojevich spokesperson denied that the governor was involved in any illegal activity, saying "Stuart Levine's assertions about the governor are wrong. As we've said before, that's not how the governor does business."

On April 3, 2008, Levine testified that Blagojevich was aware of a shakedown involving businessman and movie producer Tom Rosenberg in 2004. Levine said that when Rosenberg threatened to go to the authorities over what he saw as an extortion attempt, Rezko and the governor worked out a "damage control" plan. Rosenberg would get the contract, but would get no further business from the state. Levine told the jury that Blagojevich approved of this plan and told Rezko that the contract was "the last thing that Mr. Rosenberg should get from the state". Blagojevich's office responded by again denying that any such conduct took place. "We don't endorse or allow the awarding of contracts based on campaign contributions. We never have. We never will." a spokesman for the governor said.

Joseph Cari, Jr., the former finance chairman of the Democratic National Committee, testified that Blagojevich was at one time attempting to form a national fundraising presence in hopes of a run for President of the United States. Cari said that the governor told him that "contracts, legal work, investment banking work and consulting work" would be awarded to "people who helped". The governor's office again issued a denial after Cari's testimony.

On June 4, 2008, Rezko was convicted on 16 of the 24 counts against him. Facing decades in federal prison, it became clear that Rezko could cut his prison time significantly if he were to cooperate in ongoing investigations of other public figures, potentially including Blagojevich. On October 9, 2008, Rezko's sentencing was delayed indefinitely as he and his lawyers continued to talk with prosecutors in an effort to work out a deal.

The first signs of Rezko's willingness to give information to the authorities came with the October 30, 2008 indictment of longtime Illinois power broker and Blagojevich fund-raiser William Cellini. Cellini was charged with conspiring with Rezko, Levine and others to award contracts with the state's Teachers Retirement System (TRS) to companies which made campaign contributions to the Blagojevich campaign. The alleged extortion of Rosenberg was one of the instances specifically mentioned in Cellini's indictment. On November 1, 2011, Cellini was found guilty of multiple charges in the case.

In early October 2008, reports surfaced that another federal investigation was being conducted into whether Rezko had paid for the $90,000 renovation of Blagojevich's Chicago home. Blagojevich was never charged in connection with the renovations.

== Appointments ==
In early 2006, after the appointment of Claudette Marie Muhammad, chief of protocol of the Nation of Islam, to the Illinois Commission on Discrimination and Hate Crimes, five Jewish members of this commission resigned. Muhammad distanced herself from statements subsequently made by Louis Farrakhan about "false Jews, wicked Jews," and Blagojevich promised to "oversee meaningful dialogue with leaders of the Jewish, black and gay communities." Despite this, the Anti-Defamation League and anti-discrimination groups called for her removal from the state panel. The resignation or removal of fellow commission member Rick Garcia has also been called for by the Illinois Family Institute, over statements made by Garcia about Cardinal Francis George. Republican candidate for Governor Jim Oberweis echoed the call for Garcia's removal or resignation in an e-mail release as part of his campaign for the Illinois Republican gubernatorial nomination.

=== Proposed appointment of Oprah Winfrey to U.S. Senate ===
In January 2009 then-Governor of Illinois Rod Blagojevich revealed that he had considered naming talk show host Oprah Winfrey as his first choice to fill the United States Senate seat previously occupied by President Barack Obama. His stated reasons for considering Winfrey were that he viewed her as the person most instrumental in electing Obama as president, and that he viewed her as having more influence than all 100 senators combined which would make her especially formidable in advancing Obama's agenda. However, when Blagojevich became embroiled in a controversy, he was reluctant to contact Winfrey about his idea out of fear she would turn him down and out of fear that she would perceive his offer as a gimmick and instead decided to appoint former Illinois Attorney General Roland Burris to the seat. When Winfrey learned she was a candidate after the fact, she reacted with amusement, noting that while she was absolutely not interested, she did feel she could be a Senator.

== $25,000 Club ==
In the midst of the Rezko trial, the Chicago Tribune reported on what it called a "$25,000 Club" in which 75% of businesses, unions and individuals that gave a $25,000 donation to Rod Blagojevich's political campaign received benefits from the State of Illinois, including state contracts and appointments to state boards.

== Elevator Constructors Local 2 PAC ==
In July 2003, Friends of Blagojevich received a $10,000 campaign contribution from the Elevator Constructors Local 2 PAC fund. In the same month three Union Officers received appointments to the Illinois Elevator Safety Board: (1) The President of Elevator Constructors Local 2 (Chicago) Stephen Hynes was appointed as the labor representative, (2) the Business Manager of Elevator Constructors Local 55 (Peoria) Roderick Gillis was appointed as a representative of a municipality with a population under 25,000 and (3) Local 2 Business Manager and Elevator Constructors Vice President Frank J. Christensen was appointed as Chairman of the Illinois Elevator Safety Board by Governor Blagojevich. Christensen was eligible to serve as Chair because he was also appointed as a representative of a municipality between 25,000 and 50,000. Christensen is a resident of Tinley Park, IL that had a population of 48,401 in the official 2000 census. Critics challenged his eligibility because at the time of Christensen's appointment in 2003, the village of Tinley Park had a population in excess of 53,000. Christensen and the Business Manager of Elevator Constructors Local 55, Roderick Gillis were reappointed to their same board positions in 2007 by Governor Blagojevich. Tinley Park's population was in excess of 58,000 in 2007.

WBBM-TV in Chicago reported on March 4, 2008 that the Safety Board appointments are expected to come up at the Rezko trial. On March 8, 2008, the Department of Justice released more court documents showing Rezko's ties to Blagojevich administration fundraising. Included in the 10-page document, it reveals the July 23, 2003; $10,000 Elevator Constructors Local 2 PAC fund contribution went through Tony Rezko on July 24, 2003 and deposited into Blagojevich's coffers on July 25, 2003.

== Residency ==
As Governor of Illinois, Blagojevich was entitled to live in the Illinois Executive Mansion, located in the state capital of Springfield. However, he and his family opted to remain in the Ravenswood Manor neighborhood on Chicago's Northside. Blagojevich cited an unwillingness to move his older daughter away from home, and a Chicago Sun-Times columnist speculated that another reason might be Blagojevich's wife's Chicago real estate business. As Springfield state agencies became populated with workers who commuted from Chicago during the week, and the Blagojevich family shunned the use of the Mansion even for one-night stays, onlookers wrote that Blagojevich "disdains" Springfield and that Blagojevich "ignored" southern Illinois "more than any governor in Illinois history." Past governors lived in Springfield or have at least stayed there during legislative sessions, while Blagojevich stayed in Chicago during legislative sessions. He spent little time at the Illinois State Capitol. The decision not to live in the governor's mansion "offended many Illinoisans" and "infuriated just about every legislator"; Blagojevich also upset many by canceling the annual Halloween trick-or-treating at the mansion.

== Commute ==
During July and part of August 2007, Illinois lawmakers were in a deadlock over approving a state budget. In light of this, Blagojevich faced "immense" criticism for choosing to take daily commutes between Chicago and Springfield rather than stay in Springfield. The round trip on a state plane costs nearly $6,000, and Blagojevich made the trip nine times during the 2007 budget crisis between May 22 and June 7, costing Illinois taxpayers more than $75,000 according to state transportation records. The St. Louis Post-Dispatch noted that a commercial round-trip flight between Springfield and Chicago can be had on short notice for between $500 and $700. State senator Chris Lauzen, head of the legislature's audit committee, noted that the cost was more than a teacher's annual salary. After ridicule from lawmakers, voters, and editorial cartoonists, Blagojevich stopped the daily flights home. In December 2007, the Associated Press released an analysis of Blagojevich's 2007 state travel and found that $225,000 of it had been for personal reasons, rather than official business. On his last day in office, while the Senate was still deliberating, he flew back to Chicago in a state plane and was driven home by a caravan of state vehicles.

== Work hours ==
During the 2007 budget crisis, Blagojevich had criticized state lawmakers for not working five days a week, with his spokeswoman saying, "Everyone in America works five days a week and is expected to put in full-time work in order to complete their jobs" on June 4. Travel records showed that Blagojevich had flown into Springfield in May and June an average of three days a week, arriving about noon and sometimes staying for as little as three hours before returning to Chicago, less than 200 hours in total during the three months. Blagojevich was criticized by even Democratic lawmakers for what they saw as hypocrisy. Rep. John Fritchey called Blagojevich's criticism "tantamount to lunacy" once his own work schedule was examined, and Fritchey also raised the issue of Blagojevich's lack of time spent in his Chicago office in the James R. Thompson Center, saying: "He governs out of his house or out of his campaign office. That's an odd way to govern." In November 2007, Chicago television station WBBM-TV watched Blagojevich's home during normal business hours, "repeatedly finding the governor at home during normal business hours with no one other than his family coming and going.” Former employees assert that Blagojevich did not appear at his Chicago office that often. Later, during federal corruption charges against Blagojevich, Lieutenant Governor Pat Quinn questioned the effect of this isolation on Blagojevich's mental health.

== Federal arrest on corruption charges ==
At 6:15 a.m. on December 9, 2008, FBI special agents arrested Blagojevich and John Harris, the governor's chief of staff. After the simultaneous arrest at their homes, they were transported to FBI headquarters in Chicago. According to a criminal complaint filed in US District Court, Blagojevich is accused of conspiracy to commit mail fraud and wire fraud, as well as soliciting bribes. It is specifically alleged that he attempted to benefit financially from his sole authority to fill the US Senate seat vacated by President-elect Barack Obama. The complaint alleged that Blagojevich went on a profanity-laced tirade, saying that the Senate seat "is a fucking valuable thing, you just don't give it away for nothing". The affidavit says that in exchange for the Senate appointment, Blagojevich sought to be appointed as Secretary of Health and Human Services, Secretary of Energy, or ambassador, or alternatively, that he could receive a lucrative job offer from a union in return for designating a pro-union appointee. He allegedly also mentioned corporate boards his wife could be appointed to, for which she could receive $150,000 a year compensation. If he could receive nothing for the seat, the complaint says, Blagojevich considered appointing himself, to position himself for a 2016 presidential run and to give himself increased resources to mount any potential legal defense.

According to U.S. Attorney Patrick Fitzgerald, Blagojevich threatened to revoke funds to Children's Memorial Hospital after its chief executive officer did not give a $50,000 contribution to the governor's campaign.

On October 8, 2008, Blagojevich told a person described only as "Individual A" that he was willing to provide $8 million to Children's Memorial Hospital but only on the condition that he "get [Hospital Executive 1] for 50." Individual A thought Blagojevich was referring to a $50,000 campaign contribution from the hospital's chief executive officer and that the $8 million referred to a recent commitment by Blagojevich to secure state funds via "some type of pediatric care reimbursement." According to an affidavit regarding Blagojevich's corruption charges:

"Intercepted phone conversations between Rod Blagojevich and others indicate that Rod Blagojevich is contemplating revoking his state funds to Children's Memorial Hospital because Hospital Executive 1 has not made a recent campaign contribution".

Other allegations included in the 78-page criminal complaint include several of the schemes outlined during Rezko's trial. Patrick Fitzgerald, the United States Attorney for the Northern District of Illinois, described the corruption as "the most staggering crime spree in office I have ever seen."

In addition, federal investigators alleged that Blagojevich pressured the Tribune Company, parent company of the Chicago Tribune, by threatening to withhold state funds in connection with the sale of Wrigley Field unless they fired certain members of the editorial board who were critical of the governor. Federal authorities obtained recordings of Blagojevich and others after wiretapping the governor's residential phones and campaign offices, in addition to conversations recorded with the help of one of Blagojevich's closest friends, John Wyma. Fitzgerald read incriminating quotations from wiretap transcripts at a press conference held on December 9, 2008, in which he said Blagojevich engaged in a "political corruption crime spree" that "has taken us to a truly new low... We acted to stop that crime spree." Blagojevich was released on his own recognizance on bond of $4,500 after appearing before a US Magistrate. Blagojevich and Harris surrendered their passports. At least two of the Senate Candidates mentioned in transcripts were revealed, Jesse Jackson Jr for Blagojevich, and Lisa Madigan, Illinois Attorney General. Neither was accused of any wrongdoing. Federal authorities named Jackson as the candidate who was alleged as sending an "emissary" to offer Blagojevich $500,000 in campaign contributions in return for the US Senate seat. Jackson denied the claim, stating, "I never sent a message or an emissary to the governor to make an offer, to plead my case or to propose a deal about a U.S. Senate seat, period."

Following Blagojevich's arrest, he faced calls from members of both parties to resign. Lieutenant Governor Pat Quinn said in a news conference that the possibility of stepping aside "should certainly be considered by the governor today. I think he knows what he needs to do for the people." The following day, Quinn went further, stating "This is a crisis of confidence of people in their government in a democracy... The governor has to resign, or at the very least step aside." The state's other top elected officials--Attorney General Lisa Madigan, Comptroller Dan Hynes, Treasurer Alexi Giannoulias and Secretary of State Jesse White—have also called for Blagojevich to resign.

On December 10, Obama issued a statement calling for Blagojevich's resignation. He reiterated this in a press conference the next day, saying that he does not think Blagojevich "can effectively serve the people of Illinois" and that his former Senate seat "belongs to the people." He also stated that to his knowledge, "no representatives of mine" had engaged in any dealmaking with the governor.

Leaders of both the state house and state senate considered holding a special session in order to strip Blagojevich of his power to appoint a replacement for Obama. Support also increased for impeaching the governor and removing him from office. Additional phone recordings played during the impeachment trial revealed further criminal activities allegedly committed by the governor. Among them were discussions with a horse track operator in which the governor sought a large campaign contribution in exchange for signing legislation that would direct casino money to the horse racing industry.

On December 10, all 50 remaining Senate Democrats signed a letter calling for Blagojevich to resign and demanding that he not appoint a replacement for Obama. The letter also said that if Blagojevich did appoint a successor, "we would be forced to exercise our Constitutional authority under Article I, Section 5, to determine whether such a person should be seated"—seemingly indicating that any Blagojevich-appointed replacement would not be allowed to serve. Earlier, Illinois' remaining Senator, Majority Whip Dick Durbin, urged the state legislature to quickly set a special election to fill Obama's vacant Senate seat, saying that any appointment by Blagojevich would not be legitimate. On December 12, Madigan filed a motion with the Illinois Supreme Court seeking Blagojevich's temporary removal from office (i.e. removal of his powers & duties of office) and naming Quinn acting governor. Failing that, Madigan sought a temporary injunction barring Blagojevich from appointing a replacement for Obama. She had originally said she would only go to the Supreme Court as a last resort if the General Assembly failed to impeach the governor. However, she said in a press conference that she felt the federal charges were too severe to wait for the legislature to act. On December 15, the Illinois House voted 113-0 to begin impeachment proceedings.

When asked about the federal investigation the day before his arrest, Blagojevich said there was "nothing but sunshine hanging over me" and that "whatever I say is always lawful and the things I'm interested in are always lawful."

== Impeachment ==
In October 2007, The Chicago Tribune published an editorial encouraging passage of a constitutional amendment that would allow the power of recalling state officials, specifically Blagojevich. The newspaper wrote that since Blagojevich would probably not resign and lawmakers probably would not impeach him, "So the realistic question becomes this: Given the multiple ineptitudes of Rod Blagojevich -- his reckless financial stewardship, his dictatorial antics, his penchant for creating political enemies -- should citizens create a new way to terminate a chief executive who won't, or can't, do his job?... Having endured the Blagojevich era, we believe voters never should have to endure another one like it. They instead should have the power to recall an inept governor." Recall legislation to put a question on the ballot in November 2008 passed the House, but not the Senate.

On April 22, 2008, the former head of the Illinois Finance Authority (IFA) became the first person to accuse Blagojevich of personally offering a position in his administration in return for campaign contributions. Ali Ata pleaded guilty to one count of tax fraud and one count of making false statements to federal authorities. In exchange for Ata's cooperation with the investigation, prosecutors dropped charges that he had used his IFA position to help Rezko sell his pizza franchises - a scheme for which Rezko was indicted separately from the bribery case. In the plea agreement, Ata admitted to meeting with Rezko several times regarding fundraising efforts for Blagojevich's campaign, and discussing the possibility of a position with a state agency in return for the contributions. He further stated that Blagojevich was present at one such meeting in 2002, in which Ata presented a $25,000 campaign contribution. According to the plea agreement, Blagojevich expressed his "pleasure" with Ata's fundraising and "asked Rezko if he (Rezko) had talked to the Defendant [Ata] about positions in the administration, and Rezko responded that he had". Ata was eventually appointed to the IFA post, and further admitted to giving Rezko about $125,000 in bribes before and after his appointment. Ata repeated these allegations on the witness stand at Rezko's trial. The governor's office issued another denial, and continued to deny that Blagojevich was "Public Official A", despite Judge St. Eve's earlier confirmation. Prosecutors later said that Ata was also prepared to testify that Rezko sought and received a $25,000 bribe in 2002 which Rezko claimed would be used to pay for repairs to Blagojevich's home.

In the wake of Ata's guilty plea and accusations against Blagojevich, what had previously been only rumors of impeachment gained credibility when two State House Democrats told the Chicago Sun-Times that a decision on an impeachment resolution could be near. State representatives Jack Franks and John Fritchey said that the revelations made impeachment a real possibility. Fritchey, the representative from Blagojevich's home district in Chicago, explained that "We now find ourselves in a very different environment, where an individual has pled guilty to being a co-conspirator in transactions involving the governor." Previously, a Republican group had urged impeachment proceedings due to "near-criminal mismanagement of the state's finances".

On December 15, 2008, Illinois Speaker of the House Michael Madigan announced that he was taking steps to initiate impeachment proceedings against Blagojevich.

On January 8, 2009, a House committee recommended impeachment. On January 9, the House voted 114–1—well more than the 60 required for passage—to impeach Blagojevich. The only member to vote against was Milton Patterson, a Democrat from Chicago's South Side. Elga L. Jefferies, another South Side Democrat, voted present. Blagojevich is the first Illinois governor to be impeached. The Senate trial was expected to begin on January 26. A second vote for impeachment, taken on January 14 at the beginning of the next General Assembly, resulted in a vote of 117 for impeachment, 1 opposed. The one opposition vote came from new House member Deb Mell, Blagojevich's sister-in-law. On January 28, Blagojevich, who first boycotted his own impeachment trial, asked to address the Senate which would be deliberating his case. On January 29, Blagojevich appeared before the state Senate and pleaded for acquittal, but the Senate convicted him by a 59-0 vote. They removed him from office and banned him from any future statewide office. He is the eighth governor removed from office in U.S. history.

== "Blacker than Barack Obama" ==
On January 11, 2010, it was reported that Blagojevich had stated, in an interview with Esquire Magazine, that he was "blacker than Barack Obama". Blagojevich later apologized for his comment.
