= Rod Blagojevich corruption charges =

2008 indictment of the then-Governor of Illinois

Blagojevich corruption scandal

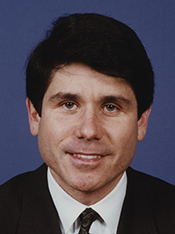
Illinois Governor
Rod Blagojevich

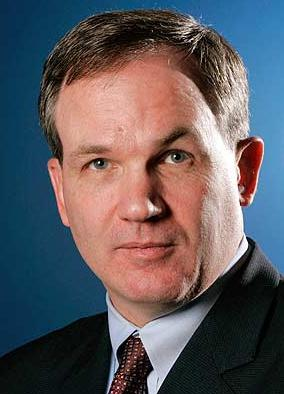
Federal Prosecutor Patrick Fitzgerald

Former Illinois Governor Rod Blagojevich was found guilty on federal corruption charges regarding the filling of President Obama's vacant Senate seat and other charges.

Accused

- Rod Blagojevich, former Governor of Illinois
- John Harris, Blagojevich's chief of staff
- Robert Blagojevich, the former governor's brother and head of his campaign fund, Friends of Blagojevich (All charges were dropped in August 2010)
- Alonzo Monk, former chief of staff
- Christopher G. Kelly, a Springfield businessman (Died after having entered a guilty plea but before beginning his prison sentence)
- Ali Ata, former director of Illinois Finance Authority under Blagojevich
- Stuart Levine, Blagojevich campaign contributor
- Joseph Cari, former finance chairman of Democratic National Committee
- Tony Rezko, fast-food entrepreneur and Chicago real estate developer. Major contributor to Illinois politicians
- William Cellini, Springfield power broker

Charges

- Solicitation of bribes in exchange for Barack Obama's vacant Senate seat
- Mail fraud
- Attempting to bribe the Chicago Tribune with state funds
- Abuse of power in attempting to gain campaign contributions from Children's Memorial Hospital

Federal Investigation

- Led by Patrick Fitzgerald
- Began in 2005 (wire-tapping began November 5, 2008)

Results

- Blagojevich impeached, unanimously removed from office and barred from holding office in the State.
- Indicted by a federal grand jury.
- Found guilty of one count of making false statements and a mistrial declared on 23 charges due to a hung jury after 14 days of jury deliberation. All charges against Robert Blagojevich dismissed.
- At retrial, found guilty of 11 charges of corruption related to Obama seat and 6 charges related to pay-to-play dealings for a hospital. Found not guilty of one count and jury deadlocked on one count of pay-to-play related to road construction. Jury deadlocked on one charge of fraud related to Rahm Emanuel.
- Sentenced to 14 years in prison on December 7, 2011 (commuted to time served by President Donald Trump on February 10, 2025).
- Disbarred from practicing law in the State of Illinois May 18, 2020

In December 2008, then-Democratic Governor of Illinois Rod Blagojevich and his Chief of Staff John Harris were charged with corruption by federal prosecutor Patrick Fitzgerald. As a result, Blagojevich was impeached by the Illinois General Assembly and removed from office by the Illinois Senate in January 2009. The federal investigation continued after his removal from office, and he was indicted on corruption charges in April of that year. The jury found Blagojevich guilty in August 2010 of one charge of making false statements with a mistrial being declared on the other 23 counts due to a hung jury after 14 days of jury deliberation. On June 27, 2011, after a retrial, Blagojevich was found guilty of 17 charges (including wire fraud, attempted extortion, and conspiracy to solicit bribes), not guilty on one charge and the jury deadlocked after 10 days of deliberation on the two remaining charges. On December 7, 2011, Blagojevich was sentenced to 14 years in prison.

The investigation became public knowledge when a federal judge revealed that Blagojevich was the "Public Official A" in the indictment of Tony Rezko. The case gained widespread attention with the simultaneous arrests of Blagojevich and Harris on the morning of December 9, 2008 at their homes by FBI Special Agents. Blagojevich and Harris were each charged with one count of conspiracy to commit mail and wire fraud and one count of soliciting bribes. The case involved sweeping pay to play and influence peddling allegations, including the solicitation of personal benefit in exchange for an appointment to the U.S. Senate as a replacement for Barack Obama, who had resigned after being elected U.S. President. U.S. Attorney Patrick Fitzgerald noted that there had been no evidence of wrongdoing by Obama.

After the arrest, Illinois elected officials began calling on Blagojevich to resign. The 50 members of the U.S. Senate's Democratic caucus called on Blagojevich to not appoint a senator and pledged not to seat anyone he attempted to appoint. Legislators introduced bills in both houses of the Illinois General Assembly to remove the Governor's power to appoint a senator and require a special election; however, no such bill passed. Blagojevich did eventually appoint Roland Burris to the seat. Despite attempts to keep Burris from taking the seat in the U.S. Senate, he was eventually allowed to take the oath of office. Within days of Blagojevich's arrest, Illinois Attorney General Lisa Madigan filed a motion with the Illinois Supreme Court seeking to declare the Governor "unable to serve" and strip him of the powers of his office. The court denied the request. Meanwhile, Illinois House Speaker Mike Madigan (the Attorney General's father) announced that on December 16 he would begin impeachment proceedings. The state House impeached Blagojevich on January 9, 2009, and the state Senate convicted him 20 days later, thereby removing him; they also disqualified him from holding further office in the state.

== Background ==
Governor of Illinois Rod Blagojevich had been under investigation for corrupt activity for four years, as part of a broader federal investigation by Patrick Fitzgerald, code-named Operation Board Games, that had been going on for three years. To date, 15 people have been charged in connection with the investigation. Blagojevich had long been suspected to be a target of the investigation, but it was confirmed by U.S. District Judge Amy St. Eve that he was the "Public Official A" referred to in the federal indictment of Tony Rezko.

=== Pamela Meyer Davis ===
Pamela Meyer Davis was the president and C.E.O. of Edward Hospital in Naperville, Illinois who was a key witness in the investigation that led to the arrest of the governor of Illinois. She began work in about 1989 at Edward Hospital in Naperville, Illinois. She was leading Edward Hospital in 2004 when the hospital was planning to build a new $90m hospital and a $23m office building in Plainfield. She complained to the FBI that Nicholas Hurtgen, a financier with Bear Stearns, claiming to speak on behalf of Stuart Levine, member of Illinois Health Facilities Planning Board, told her that she needed to employ certain companies or the hospital plans would be rejected by the Planning Board. The FBI were initially dubious at her report of wrongdoing.

Her complaints and covert recordings she made led to an investigation that led to the 2008 arrest of Blagojevich. When she retired after 28 years service in 2017, a day in June was identified in her honor.

=== Investigations ===
Just before the 2008 U.S. general elections, federal investigators were granted authority to tape Blagojevich's conversations. On December 8, 2008, in a press conference, Blagojevich claimed, "whether you tape me privately or publicly, I can tell you that whatever I say is always lawful and the things I'm interested in are always lawful." He further stated that "if anybody wants to tape my conversations, go right ahead, feel free to do it. I appreciate anybody who wants to tape me openly and notoriously; and those who feel like they want to sneakily, and wear taping devices, I would remind them that it kind of smells like Nixon and Watergate." After a meeting between Blagojevich and Jesse Jackson Jr. regarding the Senate seat, when asked his thoughts on being the subject of federal tapings, Blagojevich stated "I don't believe there's any cloud that hangs over me, I think there's nothing but sunshine hanging over me"

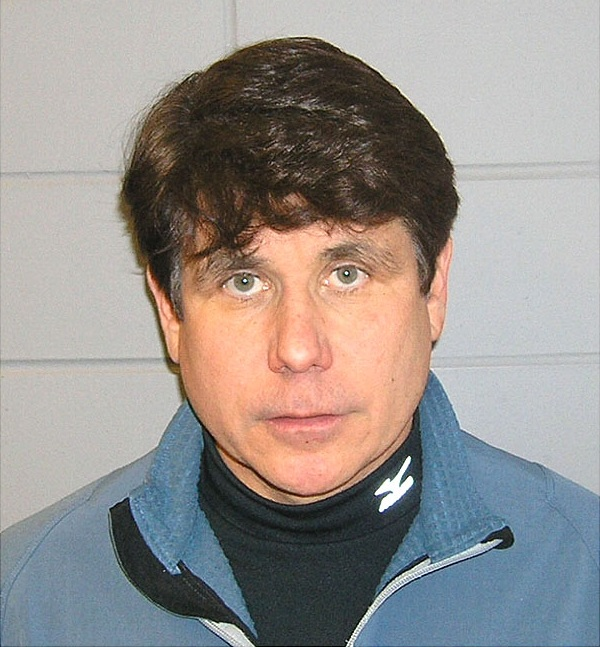
Mug shot of Blagojevich taken after his arrest

'Governor Arrested for Bribery'- video news report about Blagojevich from Voice of America, December 10, 2008

At 6:15 a.m. on December 9, 2008, Rod Blagojevich and his chief of staff John Harris were arrested at their homes by deputies of the U.S. Marshals Service on behalf of the Federal Bureau of Investigation (FBI). Blagojevich and Harris were each charged with one count of conspiracy to commit mail and wire fraud and one count of soliciting bribes. The case involved sweeping pay to play and influence peddling allegations, including the solicitation of personal benefit in exchange for an appointment to the U.S. Senate as a replacement for Barack Obama when the latter resigned after being elected U.S. President. Fitzgerald noted that there had been no evidence of wrongdoing by Obama.

Before the scandal, Blagojevich considered himself as a contender for the 2016 presidential election, but was willing to pursue an interim position as a Cabinet member, a U.S. ambassador, or a high-profile corporate titan instead. The governor viewed his statutory power to appoint a replacement for Obama in the U.S. Senate as convertible currency of the form that could assure this future. Soon after the presidential election, it became very clear to Fitzgerald from his wiretaps that a sale of the Senate seat was imminent; Fitzgerald immediately pressed for Blagojevich's arrest. After the arrest, the prosecution began proceedings to obtain an indictment from a grand jury; this process was granted an extension to April 7, 2009.

A federal grand jury in Illinois returned an indictment against Blagojevich and five other defendants on April 2, 2009. Blagojevich is the seventh Illinois Governor to have been arrested or indicted; and became the fourth to serve a prison sentence, following Dan Walker, who was jailed from 1987 to 1989. As well as the allegations concerning the Senate seat, Blagojevich has also been charged with:

- Attempting to extort the owners of the Tribune Company to fire Chicago Tribune editors who criticized the governor's handling of state affairs.
- Abuse of power concerning release of US$8 million of state funds to Children's Memorial Hospital expecting to obtain a $50,000 campaign contribution.
- Seeking graft in the form of $2.5 million in campaign contributions (through 2008) from companies and individuals who have received state contracts or appointments.

On January 2, 2009, Governor Blagojevich's federal security clearance was revoked by the United States Department of Homeland Security.

In June 2009, it was determined by the judge overseeing the case that the Blagojevich trial would start on June 3, 2010. In the wake of the scandal, reform measures are being proposed. Wisconsin Senator Russell Feingold, who then served as the chairman of the United States Senate Committee on the Judiciary's Subcommittee on the Constitution, Civil Rights, and Property Rights, had stated that he would introduce a constitutional amendment requiring vacant Senate seats be filled by special elections, as the House of Representatives requires; however, nothing ever came of it.

== Obama Senate replacement ==
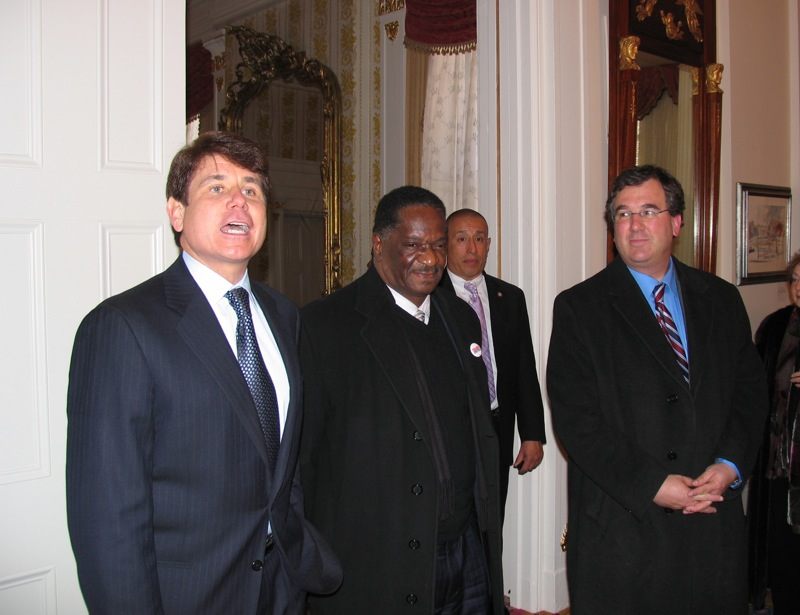
Rod Blagojevich (left), Emil Jones (center) and Jeffrey Schoenberg (right) at the Illinois Executive Mansion for a luncheon after Barack Obama launched his 2008 campaign

Fraud involving the appointment of a senator to fill the Senate seat vacated by Barack Obama's election as U.S. president has been the most notable charge against Blagojevich. Blagojevich was overheard on a recorded phone call saying, "I've got this thing, and it's fucking golden. I'm just not giving it up for fucking nothing. It's a fucking valuable thing, you just don't give it away for nothing. If I don't get what I want ... I'll just take the Senate seat myself."

Blagojevich sought the following in exchange for an appointment:

- A substantial salary for himself at either a non-profit foundation or an organization affiliated with labor unions.
- Placing his wife on paid corporate boards where he speculated she might garner as much as $150,000 a year.
- Promises of campaign funds—including cash up front.
- A Cabinet post or ambassadorship for himself to Serbia.

Following Blagojevich's arrest, Richard Durbin, the U.S. Senator for Illinois who had served alongside Barack Obama, issued a statement regarding the prospective gubernatorial appointment to replace Obama in the Senate: "No appointment by this governor, under these circumstances, could produce a credible replacement". Durbin urged the Illinois General Assembly to quickly set a special election to replace Obama. Durbin noted that Illinois had a need to call a 2009 House of Representatives special election to replace then-Representative and White House Chief of Staff-designate Rahm Emanuel in Illinois's 5th congressional district. Both Illinois Senate President Emil Jones and Illinois House Speaker Michael Madigan stated that they would call a session of their respective chambers to consider legislation to establish a special election to fill the Obama Senate seat vacancy. Bills were introduced in both houses that would have revoked the Governor's statutory authority to appoint a senator, and would have required a special election instead. Neither house debated the bills, nor were they enacted.

=== Roland Burris appointment ===
In the midst of the controversy, on December 31, 2008, Blagojevich appointed Roland Burris, a former Illinois Attorney General and the first African American to be elected to statewide office in Illinois, to the vacated Senate seat. Blagojevich stated that, per the Illinois state constitution, he had sole authority to make such an appointment and that it was his duty to ensure Illinois was fully represented in the Senate. Illinois Secretary of State Jesse White refused to certify Burris' selection for the vacant Senate seat.

Senate leaders argued that Senate Rule 2 requires a senator-designate's credentials to be signed by the state's governor and secretary of state. On January 6, when the 111th United States Congress opened its session, the Secretary of the United States Senate Nancy Erickson rejected Burris's credentials because White had not signed the certificate of appointment. Senate Majority Leader Harry Reid ordered that Burris be turned away from the Senate. The lone Democrat to show support for Burris' nomination was chair of the United States Senate Committee on Rules and Administration Dianne Feinstein, who recognized the propriety of the appointment based on the statutory authority of the Illinois Governor. On January 7, Burris met with Reid and Durbin, the two ranking Senate leaders who stated their support was conditional upon Burris both obtaining the signature of the Illinois secretary of state and testifying under oath before Illinois House of Representatives committee investigating impeachment.

On January 8, Burris testified before the Illinois House committee that he had engaged in no wrongdoing in order to procure the nomination by the Governor. The following day, the Illinois Supreme Court ruled that the prevailing statutes do not mandate the signature of the Secretary of State to validate the Governor's appointment. Further, the court ruled that the only necessary act by the Secretary of State was the registration of the appointment in Illinois's official records, which Jesse White had performed on December 31, 2008. The Illinois Supreme Court ruled that the US Senate's recommended certification form are not required to be used by Illinois and its Secretary of State. The court further ruled that the form of certificate contained in Rule 2 of the Standing Rules of the United States Senate was a recommended form and noted that "no explanation has been given as to how any rule of the Senate, whether it be formal or merely a matter of tradition, could supersede the authority to fill vacancies conferred on the states by the federal constitution."

After the court's ruling, White provided Burris with a certified copy, which bears the Seal of the State of Illinois, of the appointment's registration, which Burris delivered to the Secretary of the Senate. On January 12, 2009, after deeming Burris' credentials valid, the Senate decided to seat Burris. Burris was sworn in on January 15, 2009, by President of the Senate Dick Cheney.

Burris filed an affidavit with the Illinois House committee that oversaw Governor Blagojevich's impeachment, dated February 5, to supplement his earlier answer to a question posed by the committee. Burris acknowledged Rob Blagojevich requested "assistance in fund-raising" for the governor three times in the weeks and months before Blagojevich appointed Burris. Burris said he told Blagojevich that he could not donate to him because "it could be viewed as an attempt to curry favor with him regarding his decision to appoint a successor to President Obama." Burris stated that he neither donated to nor raised funds for the Governor after a fund-raiser on June 27, 2008. Saying that this is at odds with Burris' testimony during the impeachment trial, Illinois House Republicans said that they would consider pursuing a perjury investigation. Democratic officials, including Illinois Attorney General Lisa Madigan, supported that announcement.

On February 16, in comments to reporters, Burris acknowledged he sought to raise campaign funds for Blagojevich at the request of the governor's brother at the same time he was making a pitch to be appointed to the Senate. Burris is accused of lying during his January 8 testimony to the Illinois House of Representatives and the United States Senate Select Committee on Ethics has opened a preliminary investigation into the matter. Illinois Speaker of the House Mike Madigan has forwarded materials for review in the Illinois State Capital and expulsion from the United States Senate is considered a possibility even though only 15 persons have previously been expelled, most recently in 1862. Expulsion would require a simple majority vote by the committee and a two-thirds supermajority vote by the full Senate. In the subsequent days, records came out that showed Burris to have misrepresented a list of his lobbying clients. The series of controversies prompted Durbin to refer to it as the embarrassing "Blagojevich burlesque" and he mentioned that a resignation might relieve the situation. Illinois Governor Quinn called a press conference to request a resignation for the good of the Illinois citizens. Several Democrats called for Burris' resignation; the Obama administration asked that he reconsider his future, and a pair of employees resigned from Burris' staff. On February 21, Burris met with federal authorities regarding his involvement in the matter.

Durbin requested a meeting with Burris on February 24 to discuss the disclosures. Durbin told reporters that during the meeting he advised him to resign: "I told him under the circumstances that I would consider resigning". Burris stated that he would not do so. Durbin also inquired about Burris' plans for the 2010 U.S. Senate elections and relayed to Burris that he would be very unlikely to succeed in the primary or general election. Quinn endorsed a special election to replace Burris, but there was vocal and procedural resistance in the Illinois General Assembly. On February 25, Lisa Madigan confirmed the constitutionality of moving forward a direct election for the seat formerly held by Obama to a targeted May 26 date. The following day, a story unfolded involving Burris' son who obtained a $75,000 job under Rod Blagojevich on September 10 as a senior counsel for the state's housing authority — about six weeks after the Internal Revenue Service placed a $34,163 tax lien on Burris II and three weeks after a mortgage company filed a foreclosure suit on his South Side house.

=== Obama's involvement ===
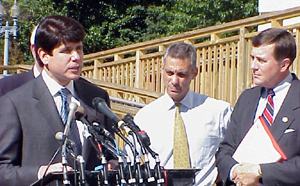
Governor Rod Blagojevich (left) and Rahm Emanuel, Obama's Chief of Staff (center)

Blagojevich was aware that Barack Obama would have preferred "Senate Candidate #1" (Valerie Jarrett), and made efforts to obtain favors in exchange for appointing Jarrett for the U.S. Senate seat. Blagojevich said in a conversation with his chief of staff, in reference to what Obama would give him in exchange for Jarrett's appointment, "All they're going to give me in return is gratitude. The Senate seat's a fucking valuable thing. Fuck them." There was public speculation as to whether Obama's Chief of Staff, Rahm Emanuel, had a role in any discussions with the governor's office. An internal investigation by the Obama team stated that Emanuel had communicated with the Governor's office about who might be appointed to the Obama seat, but nothing unethical or inappropriate had transpired.

On December 10, Obama called for Blagojevich's resignation.

In a December 11 press conference, Obama stated that he and his staff and transition team were not involved in any corrupt activity, and that his staff had been exonerated by the 76-page FBI affidavit. He stated that, not only had he never engaged the governor on the topic of his Senate seat, but he was "confident that no representative of mine would have any part in any deals related to this seat". His administration compiled a summary of who might have known what at various times. Obama stated that he did not think Blagojevich could "effectively serve the people of Illinois" and that his former Senate seat "belongs to the people". He also stated that to his knowledge, no representatives of his had engaged in any dealmaking with the governor.

They're not willing to give me anything except appreciation. Fuck them.

— Rod Blagojevich

On December 15, the Obama team confirmed that its internal review found no inappropriate contact between Obama's staff and Blagojevich or his staff, stating "that review affirmed the public statements of the president-elect that he had no contact with the governor or his staff over the selection of his successor as U.S. president-elect's staff was not involved in inappropriate discussions with the governor or his staff over the selection of his successor as U.S. Senator".

In April 2010, Blagojevich moved to subpoena Obama.

== Replacing Blagojevich ==
Calls for Blagojevich to Resign

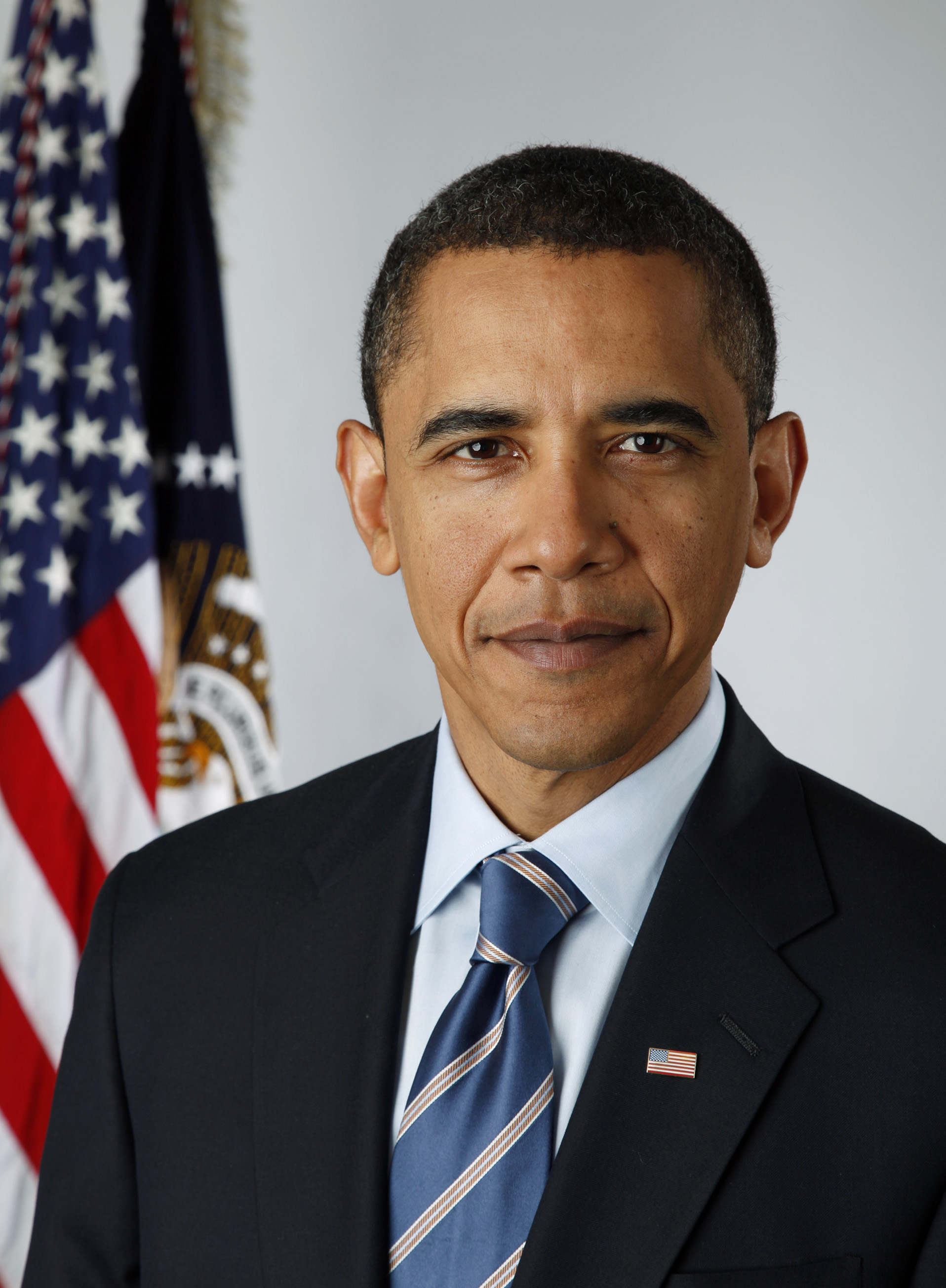
Barack Obama

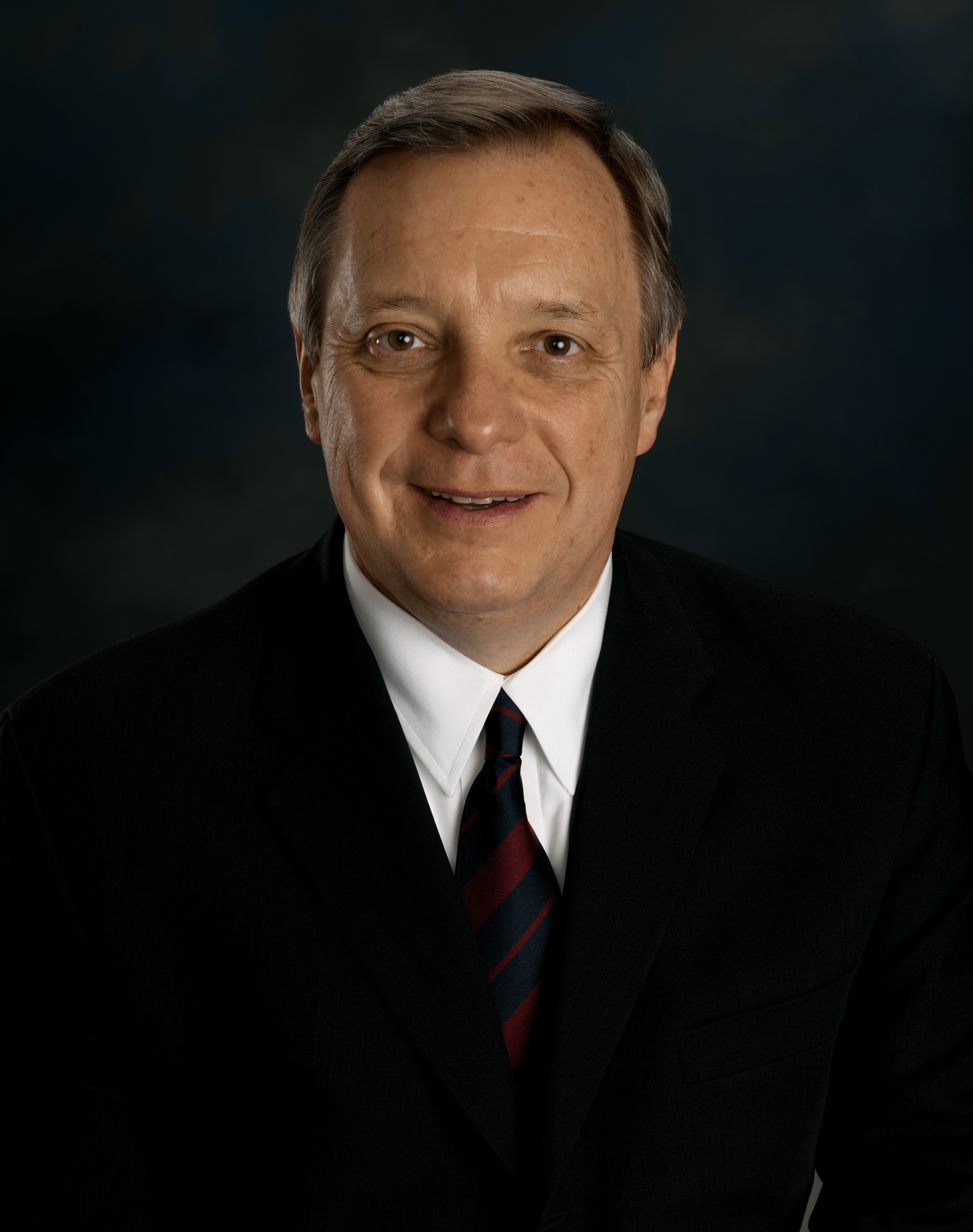
Dick Durbin

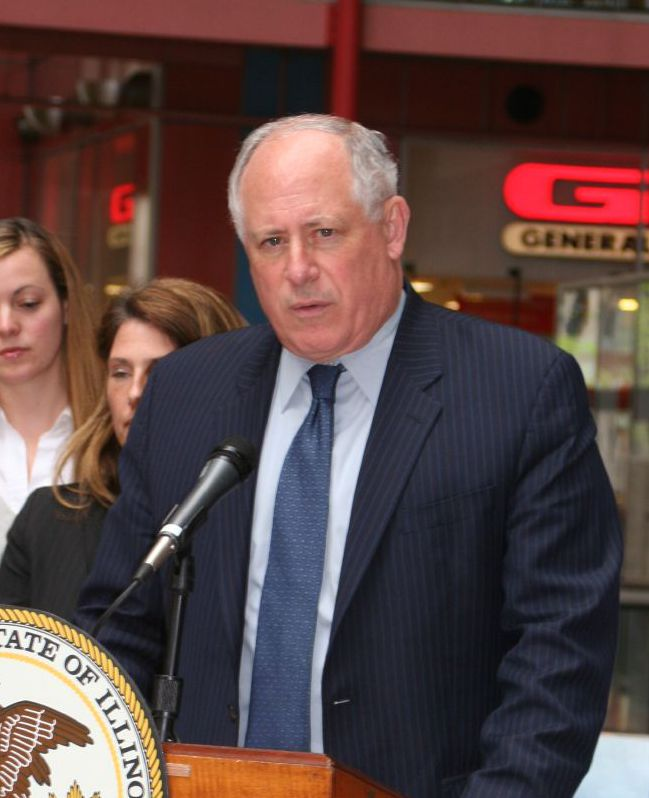
Pat Quinn

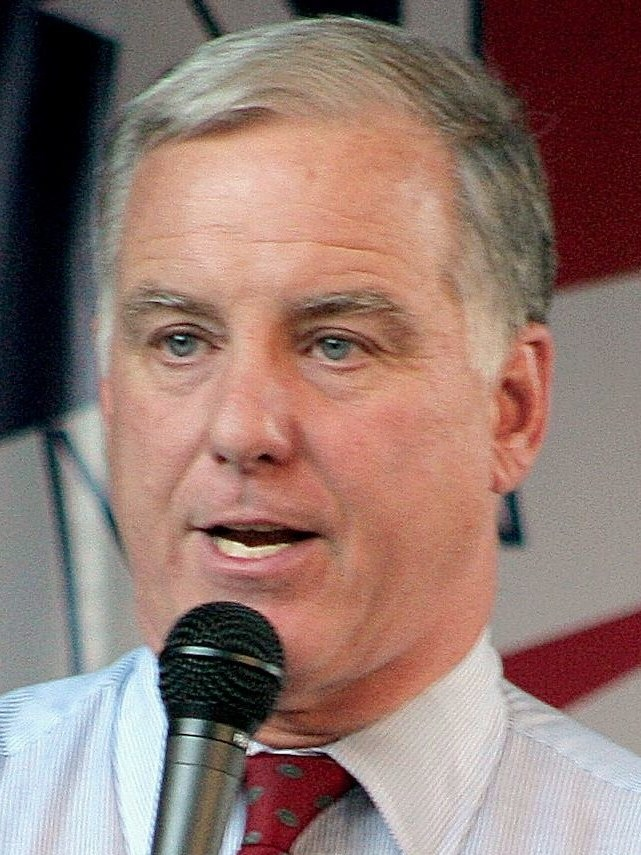
Howard Dean

Several national and state officials called for Blagojevich to resign.

Calls for Resignation from Prominent Democrats

- On December 10, 2008, President-elect Barack Obama
- On December 11, 2008, DNC Chair Howard Dean
- On December 9, 2008, Lieutenant Governor Pat Quinn
- Illinois Attorney General Lisa Madigan
- Illinois Secretary of State Jesse White
- Illinois Treasurer Alexi Giannoulias
- Illinois Comptroller Daniel Hynes
- On December 10, 2008, all 50 members of the Democratic Caucus of the United States Senate in a letter sent by Senate Majority Leader Harry Reid
- State Representative John Fritchey
- Colorado Governor Bill Ritter
- U.S. Representatives Jan Schakowsky, Jerry Costello

Calls for Resignation from Prominent Republicans

- Illinois Senate Minority Leader Frank Watson
- U.S. Congressman John Shimkus

After his arrest, Blagojevich appeared before U.S. Magistrate Judge Nan R. Nolan, in the United States District Court for the Northern District of Illinois, and was released on a $4,500 signature bond. He was also ordered to surrender his passport and his firearm owner's identification card. He then returned to work where his office issued a statement saying the "allegations do nothing to impact the services, duties or function of the State".

Had he pleaded guilty to the charges, Blagojevich would have been automatically forced to resign, as the Illinois Constitution does not allow convicted felons to hold office.

On December 11, 2008, Democratic Illinois Representative John Fritchey circulated a letter to the Illinois House Democratic Caucus to outline options for moving beyond the crisis caused by the criminal allegations against Blagojevich. In the letter, Fritchey mentioned the following scenarios to replace Blagojevich:

1. Voluntary resignation of Blagojevich as Governor of Illinois,
2. Filing of a Rule 382 motion by Illinois Attorney General Lisa Madigan with the Illinois Supreme Court to seek a judicial ruling that Blagojevich was unable or unwilling to carry out his gubernatorial duties, and
3. Introducing a motion in the Illinois House of Representatives to begin impeachment proceedings against Governor Blagojevich.

Between December 13 and December 14, Blagojevich's attorney Ed Genson, at hearings by the Illinois House of Representatives' Special Committee on Impeachment, stated that the Governor would not resign.

=== Calls for resignation ===
Blagojevich faced calls from members of both major parties and prominent politicians to resign. On December 9, Lieutenant Governor Pat Quinn said in a news conference that Blagojevich should temporarily step aside from his office. On December 10, he went further and called for Blagojevich to resign, and also raised questions regarding his mental health. The state's other top elected officials—Attorney General Lisa Madigan, Comptroller Dan Hynes, Treasurer Alexi Giannoulias, and Secretary of State Jesse White—also called for Blagojevich to resign.

Outgoing Democratic National Committee Chairman Howard Dean also called for the governor to step down.

On December 10, 2008, the Democratic Caucus of the United States Senate called for Blagojevich to resign and demanded that he not appoint a replacement for Obama. The letter also mentioned that, if Blagojevich appointed a successor to Obama in the U.S. Senate, the U.S. Senate would be "forced to exercise [its] Constitutional authority under Article I, Section 5, to determine whether such a person should be seated". Senate Majority Leader Harry Reid indicated that the Senate might not seat a Blagojevich appointment because such an appointee "would be under a cloud of suspicion".

Illinois' remaining senator, Majority Whip Dick Durbin, urged the state legislature to quickly set a special election to fill Obama's vacant Senate seat, saying that any appointment by Blagojevich would not be legitimate.

Illinois Senate Minority Leader Frank Watson, Illinois Congressman John Shimkus, and many Illinois state legislators from both parties also called for Blagojevich to resign.

House Speaker Madigan thought that it would be inappropriate to make a statement calling for a resignation or a statement supporting an impeachment because he would have to preside over any impeachment debate.

=== Blagojevich's defense ===
On December 19, 2008, at the James R. Thompson Center, Blagojevich said that he "had done nothing wrong" and would not resign as governor in the face of federal corruption charges. He added that he would "answer [all questions] in the appropriate forum: in a court of law", where he believed he would be "vindicated", vowing to fight "false accusations and a political lynch mob". He proceeded to quote from Rudyard Kipling's poem If—. After reading the prepared statement, Blagojevich exited the room and did not take any questions.

=== Court actions to declare Blagojevich unfit to serve ===
On December 12, 2008, Illinois Attorney General Lisa Madigan began legal proceedings in the Illinois Supreme Court to have Blagojevich declared "unfit to serve" in case he did not resign.

Madigan filed a motion with the Illinois Supreme Court asking it to temporarily suspend Blagojevich's powers by declaring him unable to serve and name Lieutenant Governor Quinn as acting governor. Failing that, Madigan sought a temporary injunction barring Blagojevich from appointing a replacement for Obama. She said that given the nature of the charges, the situation was too severe to wait for the legislature to act. The Supreme Court, however, in orders without opinions, denied Madigan leave to file the complaint, and it denied the motion for temporary relief.

=== Impeachment ===
According to the FBI affidavit, Blagojevich attempted to have Chicago Tribune writers fired for discussing his possible impeachment. Jan Schakowsky, a Democrat representing Illinois's 9th congressional district, called for impeachment proceedings to begin should Blagojevich not resign promptly.

On December 15, just six days after the scandal broke with no resignation by the Governor, the Illinois House voted unanimously 113–0 to begin impeachment proceedings. This was the first impeachment inquiry against an Illinois Governor. Also, on that same day, Illinois House Speaker Michael Madigan formed a bipartisan committee of inquiry within the House of Representatives to run an impeachment inquiry.

It is my intention to appoint a special committee to begin immediately an investigation into the governor's conduct in office and to undertake the preparatory work that is a prerequisite to an impeachment proceeding in the Illinois House

— Michael Madigan

Madigan further stated, "We have given the governor six days to resign." He also stated that the committee would work every day except Christmas Eve, Christmas Day, New Year's Eve, and New Year's Day until they had completed their report. The Illinois House would decide whether to impeach after the committee completed its review. The Illinois Senate would then have a trial to remove the Governor from office. Illinois House Majority Leader Barbara Flynn Currie was the chairperson of the Special Committee on Impeachment.

Madigan stated that the impeachment committee would consider the pending criminal charges as well as review other possible wrongdoing during Blagojevich's term such as abuse of power, taking action without legal authority, ignoring state laws, and defying lawful requests for information from the General Assembly. Currie further stated that among the controversial actions under review by the committee would be the Blagojevich administration's purchase of a flu vaccine that was never distributed and his unilateral decision to send a $1 million grant to a private school that was damaged when the historic Pilgrim Baptist Church was destroyed by fire. She also warned that the panel's interest in investigating alleged criminal activities surrounding Blagojevich might be affected by how much cooperation was forthcoming from federal investigators, which was supported by a formal written request to Prosecutor Fitzgerald. On December 30, Fitzgerald filed a motion to allow the impeachment committee to hear the conversations recorded by wiretap during his federal investigation.

==== Impeachment vote and trial ====
On January 8, 2009, after the testimony by Roland Burris, the 21-member bipartisan committee on impeachment voted unanimously to recommend that the House impeach the Governor. The following day, the full House voted 114–1 to impeach the governor. The lone dissenter was Chicago-area Representative Milton Patterson; three other representatives abstained. After the Illinois House impeached Blagojevich, the Illinois Senate held a trial at which Illinois Supreme Court Chief Justice Thomas R. Fitzgerald presided. Under the Illinois Constitution, Fitzgerald rather than Senate President John Cullerton, presided because the accused was the governor.

Blagojevich was the sixteenth governor in the United States and the first Illinois governor to have been impeached. Seven of the fifteen impeached governors were removed from office.

The article of impeachment alleged a pattern of conduct constituting abuse of power, including the events described in the criminal complaint and several instances of ignoring Illinois law in his use of executive power. In particular, it accused Blagojevich of engaging in a conduct constituting a pattern of abuse of power. Among the misdeeds were the following:

- Plotting to "obtain a personal benefit in exchange for his appointment to fill the [President-elect Barack Obama's] vacant seat in the United States Senate";
- Plotting to extort the Tribune Company by withholding state funds unless it fired certain members of the editorial board who had been critical of the governor;
- Plotting to obtain a campaign contribution in exchange for signing a bill to divert casino gambling revenues to the horse racing industry.

On January 14, the new session of the Illinois House of Representatives convened and voted to affirm the impeachment vote of the prior session with only Blagojevich's sister-in-law Deborah Mell dissenting.

The impeachment trial in the Illinois State Senate began on January 26, 2009. Blagojevich boycotted attending his own hearings, referring to them as a kangaroo court. Neither the governor nor his lawyer was present in Springfield, Illinois on the first day of the trial. Blagojevich spent the day in New York City making media appearances on a myriad of shows including Good Morning America and The View. In his absence, a "not guilty" plea was automatically entered on his behalf. On the same day, in a cable television news interview with Geraldo Rivera, Blagojevich derided the whole process. Lead attorney Ed Genson announced that he was withdrawing from representing Blagojevich, saying "I never require a client to do what I say, but I do require them to at least listen." Blagojevich was in New York again the next day continuing an apparent attempt to upstage the hearings with eleven media appointments at places such as The Early Show, and the Associated Press. Blagojevich insisted that unlike Richard Nixon who did not want his tapes heard during Watergate, he wanted his tapes heard in order to reveal the whole truth, which he felt would vindicate him.

On January 27, Federal prosecutors played four recordings from among the thousands of intercepted calls from Blagojevich's home and campaign offices. Although lawmakers trying to build an impeachment case wanted to hear more, the prosecutors feared further collaboration could jeopardize the criminal case against the governor. The recordings played at the impeachment trial were taped in November and December and revealed efforts by Blagojevich to collect money from a horse track owner in exchange for signing legislation benefiting the racing industry, prosecutors said. State Senator Dan Cronin said hearing the recordings "hits me right here in the stomach. It sort of reminds me of some Hollywood movie or a couple of thugs in a car driving around." Daniel Cain, an FBI agent who investigated Blagojevich for years, also testified on January 27 and answered questions that did not extend to information not presented in the affidavit.

On January 28, Blagojevich requested the opportunity to deliver his own closing arguments, although he would not testify or submit himself to cross-examination. The Senate allowed Blagojevich to file an appearance late, enabling him to make a 90-minute closing argument.

The following day, January 29, the prosecution delivered a 40-minute closing argument. Blagojevich then delivered his 47-minute closing arguments in defense. Among Blagojevich's statement were continuing reminders that he believed the process to be tainted because it did not allow him to call witnesses or challenge the evidence (although, as the Chicago Tribune reported two days earlier, the process did in fact allow the governor to call witnesses and challenge the evidence, but Blagojevich had done neither by the deadline). The prosecution then made a 12-minute rebuttal. Blagojevich did not remain in the Statehouse for the prosecution's rebuttal speech or the vote on his impeachment. After giving his closing statement, Blagojevich immediately left Springfield to return to his Chicago home aboard an official state aircraft. Had Blagojevich remained in Springfield for his impeachment, he would have been immediately ineligible to be transported on state aircraft as he would no longer be governor—he would have been stranded in Springfield, responsible for his own transportation home.

After a recess, the Senate debated the vote on the article of impeachment. Under the Illinois Constitution, a two-thirds majority, or 40 votes out of 59, was required to convict him on the article of impeachment. After several hours of deliberations, Rod Blagojevich was convicted and removed from office by a unanimous vote of 59–0. State Senator Mike Frerichs then moved that Blagojevich be banned from ever holding office in Illinois again. This motion carried, also by a unanimous vote of 59–0. Shortly after the vote, the lieutenant governor, Pat Quinn was sworn in as the new governor. Although Blagojevich is disqualified from running for any Government of Illinois office, he is eligible to run for federal office such as his old congressional seat.

== Placeholder names in the complaint ==
Placeholder Names
Senate Candidate 1	Valerie Jarrett (probably)
Senate Candidate 2	Lisa Madigan (confirmed)
Senate Candidate 3	Jan Schakowsky (speculation)
Senate Candidate 4	Louanner Peters (probably)
Senate Candidate 5	Jesse Jackson Jr. (confirmed)
Senate Candidate 6	J. B. Pritzker (speculation)
President-elect Advisor	Rahm Emanuel (probably)
Deputy Governor A	Bob Greenlee (probably)
Individual A	John Wyma (probably)
Fundraiser A	Rob Blagojevich (confirmed)
Lobbyist 1	Lon Monk (probably)
Contributor 1	John Johnston (confirmed)
Adviser B	
Individual D	Raghuveer P. Nayak (confirmed)

Candidates
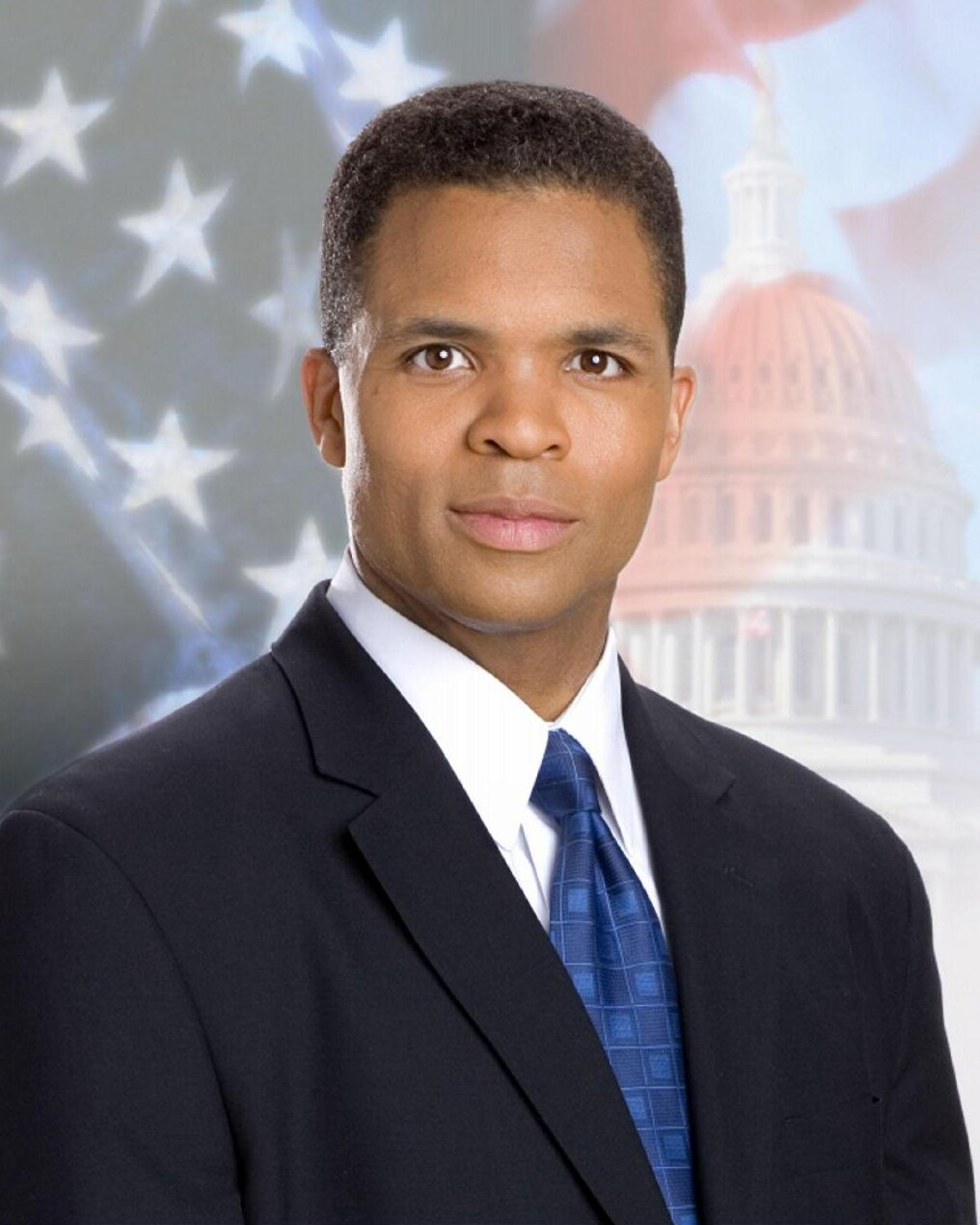
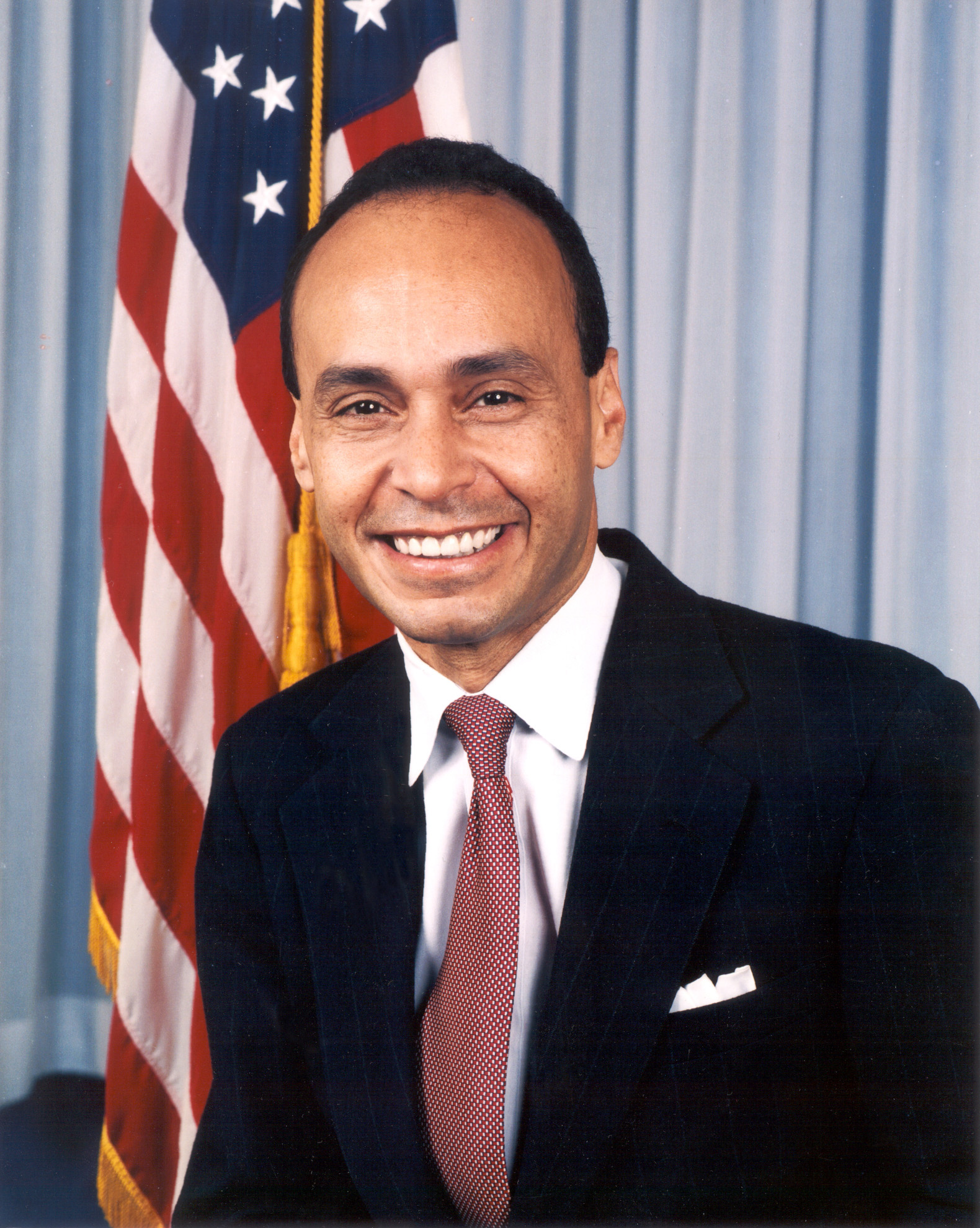
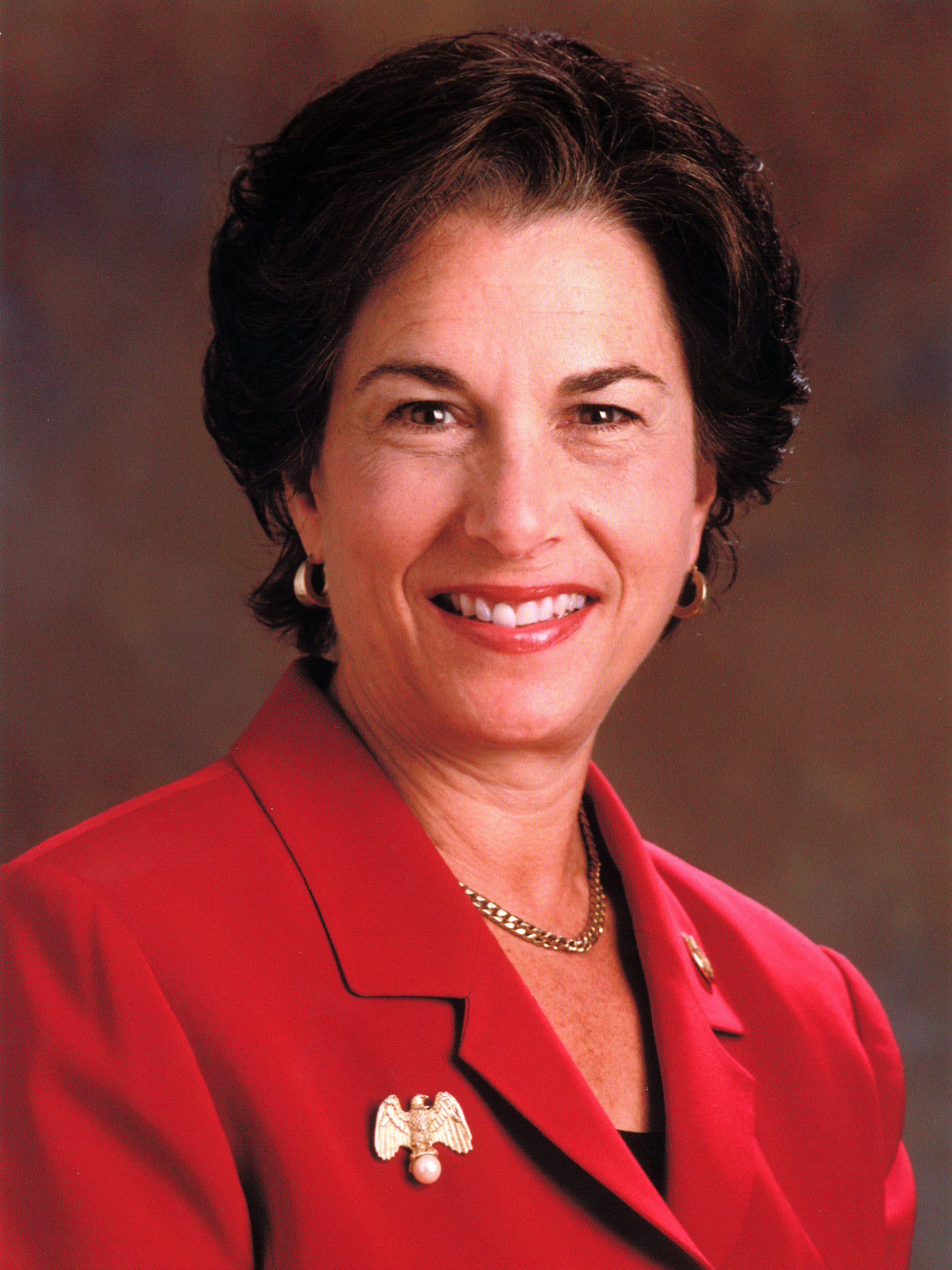
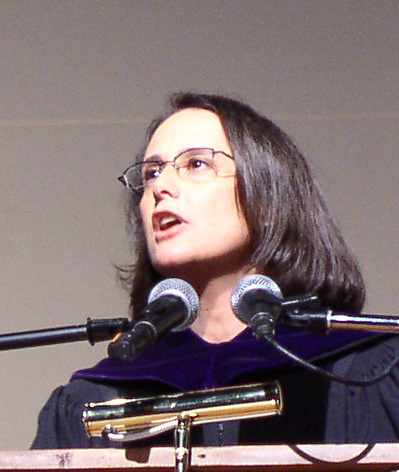
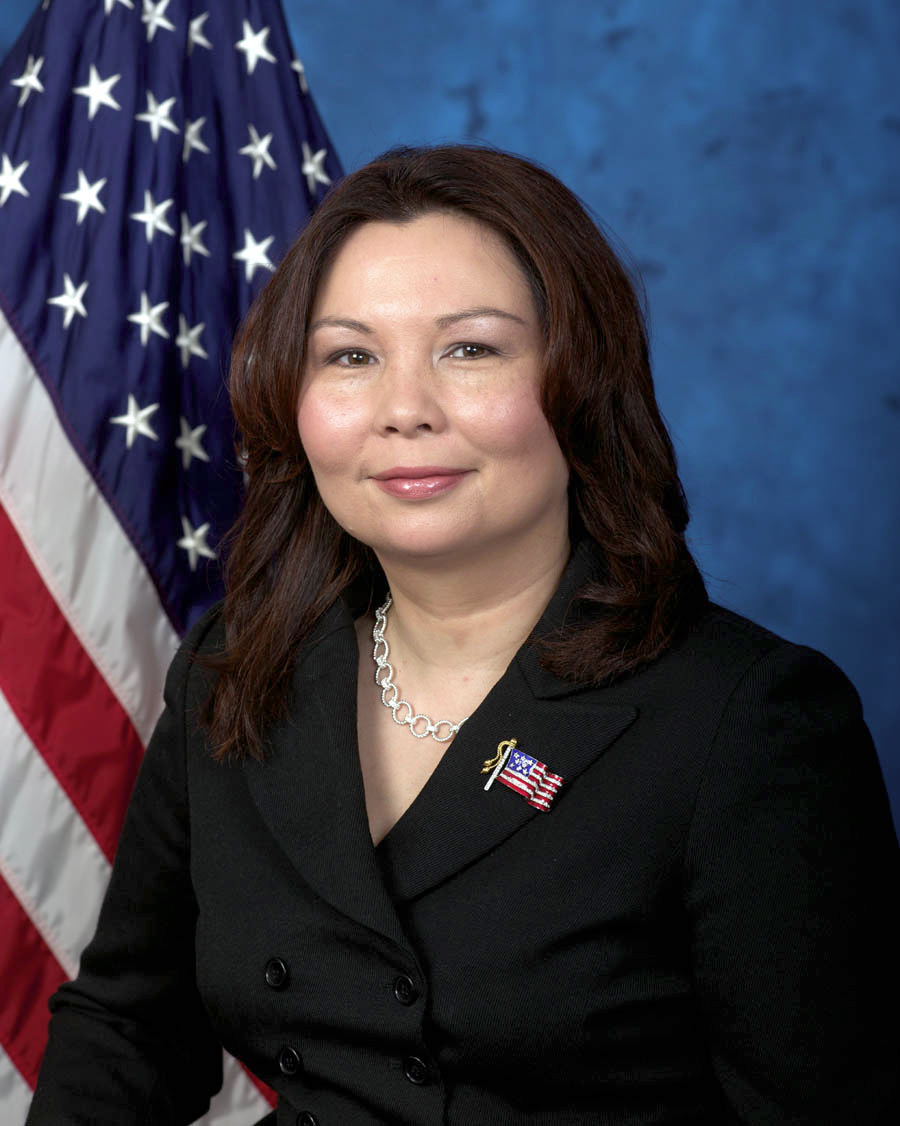
(left to right) US Representatives Jesse Jackson, Jr., Luis Gutierrez and Jan Schakowsky, Attorney General Lisa Madigan, and Illinois Department of Veterans Affairs Director Tammy Duckworth were considered as replacement candidates to fill the vacancy in the Senate.

During the federal investigation leading up to the arrest, the Federal Bureau of Investigation used wire taps at both the Governor's campaign offices and his home phone.

Rather than identifying subject individuals by name, the FBI affidavit used aliases to refer to people not necessarily accused of any crimes including the six people Blagojevich was considering appointing to the Senate seat vacated by Barack Obama.

The affidavit said that a representative of Senate Candidate 5 had proposed having the candidate raise up to $1 million for Blagojevich's campaign in exchange for being appointed to the Senate.

ABC News reported that federal law enforcement officials identified Jesse Jackson, Jr. as Senate Candidate 5. Jackson, who was asked for an interview by federal agents, denied that anyone on his behalf had offered anything for the Senate seat. Jackson claimed not to be a target of an investigation, but admitted to being questioned. Also WLS-TV reported December 15 that Jackson notified investigators that Blagojevich refused to appoint Jackson's wife, Sandi, as state lottery director because Jackson refused to donate $25,000 to the governor's campaign fund.

The affidavit says that Blagojevich knew "that the President-elect want[ed] Senate Candidate 1 for the Senate seat", but Blagojevich was upset that "they're not willing to give me anything except appreciation, so fuck them". The Washington Post identified Senate Candidate 1 as Valerie Jarrett.

Other prospects for the Senate seat, including Rep. Danny Davis and Illinois Attorney General Lisa Madigan, said that they had not been contacted by federal authorities. Madigan confirmed that she is Senate Candidate 2 in the indictment. An anonymous source described Louanner Peters as being Senate Candidate 4.

On December 10, 2008, Illinois Deputy Governor Bob Greenlee resigned, with his lawyer saying the reason for the resignation should be obvious. Reportedly, Greenlee was the colleague who advised Blagojevich to pursue the cabinet position of Secretary of Energy because it was the one that "makes the most money". Deputy Governor A is also named as the person who supposedly attempted to coerce the Chicago Tribune on Blagojevich's behalf. Schakowsky, Luis Gutierrez, Jones, and Illinois Department of Veterans Affairs Director Tammy Duckworth (who would later be elected to the seat in 2016) were also reportedly under consideration.

The 76-page FBI affidavit included extensive detail of various acts by the governor including a November 10 call between Blagojevich, Harris, his wife, and a group of advisers in which Harris had formulated an agreement with the Service Employees International Union. Harris proposed that Blagojevich would appoint a new senator who would be helpful to the president in exchange for a job as head of the union-formed group Change to Win. The union would receive an unspecified favor from Obama later under the plan.

== Criminal trial ==
=== Federal grand jury indictment ===
On April 2, 2009, a federal grand jury issued a 19 count indictment; 16 of which named Rod Blagojevich, including racketeering conspiracy, wire fraud, extortion, conspiracy, attempted extortion, and making false statements to federal agents. Prosecutors amended the indictment on February 4, 2010, in anticipation of a U.S. Supreme Court ruling on the so-called "Honest Services" law.

Four of his closest advisors were also indicted on various crimes:

- Robert Blagojevich, the ex-governor's brother (All charges against Robert Blagojevich were subsequently dropped in August 2010 following his brother's mistrial on 23 of 24 counts) was outraged how he was treated by the Federal authorities and used as a pawn against his brother. He later wrote a book about his experience that was published in 2015.
- John Harris, former chief of staff
- Alonzo Monk, another former chief of staff, who pleaded guilty, testified against the Governor, and received two years in prison
- Christopher G. Kelly, a Springfield businessman (Kelly died on September 12, 2009, after having pleaded guilty, three days before he was to begin his prison sentence.)

If convicted, the former governor faced up to 20 years in prison on the most serious counts. On July 27, 2010, the final arguments concluded, and the jury began its deliberations.

On Wednesday, August 11, 2010, after eleven days of deliberations (during the course of which they sent Judge James Zagel two notes requesting guidance and instructions), the jury sent the judge a third, rather vague, note (which Rod Blagojevich was summoned to court to hear). The note appeared to state that the jurors may be deadlocked (raising the possibility of a hung jury) on at least some, if not all, the counts.

Judge Zagel advised the jurors that they could find the former governor guilty on some (perhaps lesser) charges while finding him not guilty of others. The judge scheduled a hearing so that he, the defendants and their defense team, and prosecutors could receive further clarification on the matter. He also forbade both sides from discussing the matter further until it had been clarified and resolved.

=== Response ===
The ex-governor and his family learned of the indictment while they were vacationing in Florida, near Disney World. Through his publicist, the ex-governor stated, "I'm saddened and hurt, but I am not surprised by the indictment. I am innocent. I now will fight in the courts to clear my name."

Blagojevich's successor, Gov. Pat Quinn responded, "The events of Dec 9 and the events of today underline for the people of Illinois that there is a serious crisis of integrity in our government, and I think it's very, very important that we the people confront this crisis, enact the reforms that will solve the problems and make sure they never happen again."

A Reform Commission headed by Patrick M. Collins drew up a 95-page list of recommendations for political reform in Illinois. In an emotional news conference, Collins criticized an Illinois legislative panel for its opposition to the recommendations. Proposed changes included campaign contribution limits and term limits for state legislative leaders. However House Speaker Michael Madigan and Senate president John Cullerton had not supported the reform Commission's proposals.

=== Conviction ===
On August 17, 2010, Blagojevich was convicted of one count of lying to federal agents but a mistrial was declared on the other 23 charges due to hung jury. Prosecutors pledged to retry the case as soon as possible. The four charges against Robert Blagojevich were dismissed. Prosecutors had offered to retry Robert Blagojevich separately. However, he refused and the charges were dropped the very next day. The retrial was set to begin April 20, 2011. On June 27 after ten days of deliberation, the jury found Blagojevich guilty of 11 counts related to the senate seat and 6 counts related to fundraising extortion of a hospital executive. He was found not guilty of bribery related to a fundraising shakedown of a road-building executive. The jury deadlocked on one count related to another road builder related to a 2006 fundraising pay-to-play involving then-U.S. Rep. Rahm Emanuel, eventual Chicago Mayor. Unlike the first trial, Blagojevich took the stand in his own defense. Also, for the second trial, the government dropped all racketeering charges and charges against his brother. The verdict followed the conviction of his gubernatorial predecessor five years earlier.

=== Sentence ===
On December 7, 2011, Blagojevich was sentenced to 14 years in prison. He was also given two other concurrent sentences in addition to the 168-month sentence. Federal prison does not use parole; he must serve at least 85% of the 168-month sentence before becoming eligible to be given supervised release. On March 15, 2012, Blagojevich reported to Federal Correctional Institution, Englewood in Colorado to begin serving his sentence. The Federal Bureau of Prisons previously listed Blagojevich's expected release date from prison as May 23, 2024, before his sentence was later commuted.

=== Appeal ===
On July 21, 2015, the United States Court of Appeals for the Seventh Circuit overturned four of former Illinois Gov. Rod Blagojevich's 18 convictions, stating that proposals to exchange promises for appointments "is a common exercise in logrolling". The Supreme Court of the United States announced on March 28, 2016, that they had deferred the option to hear the appeal, which instead went to the United States District Court for the Northern District of Illinois.

On August 9, 2016, U.S. District Judge James Zagel ruled that despite the four dropped charges, reports of good behavior, and pleas for leniency, Blagojevich's 14-year sentence would stand. In making his decision, Zagel noted that "these are serious crimes that had an impact on the people of Illinois." and it is "an unfortunate reality" that Blagojevich's family members are made to suffer consequences. Patti Blagojevich commented on the sentence, calling it "unusually cruel and heartless and unfair".

=== Commutation of sentence ===
President Donald Trump speaks about commuting Blagojevich on February 18, 2020. Video from the White House.

On February 18, 2020, President Donald Trump commuted Rod Blagojevich's prison sentence. Blagojevich was released from prison that day, having served about eight years of his 14-year sentence.

=== Pardon ===
On February 10, 2025, President Donald Trump pardoned Blagojevich.

== Citations ==
- Illinois Gov. Rod R. Blagojevich and his Chief of Staff John Harris Arrested on Federal Corruption Charges Department of Justice, December 9, 2008, press release
- Criminal Complaint in U.S. v. Rod Blagojevich and John Harris, December 9, 2008, copy of 76-page complaint (text version)
- Documents of the Illinois General Assembly Investigative Committee
- Sweet, Lynn Illinois House Speaker Mike Madigan, Majority leader Barbara Flynn Currie on Blagojevich impeachment. Transcript Chicago Sun-Times, December 16, 2008
- State of Illinois 95th General Assembly House of Representatives Special Investigative Committee proposed report recommending impeachment
- Complete Blagojevich Coverage Chicago Tribune, ongoing coverage
- The Blagojevich Blog Chicago Tonight at WTTW (PBS), ongoing coverage
- Turner.com, Illinois Supreme Court Ruling on Burris v. White
- CBS2Chicago.com, death of Christopher Kelly, key adviser to Blogojevich
