= OBG (disambiguation) =

OBG is an initialism for Ormeau Baths Gallery in Belfast, Northern Ireland.

OBG may also refer to:

- OBG/OBGYN, surgical–medical specialties dealing with the female reproductive organs
- OBG(W), Overwatch Battle Group (West), an Australian Army battlegroup
- OBG Ltd v Allan, a case on economic torts in English law
- Odesa Botanical Gardens, Ukraine
- Ofer Brothers Group, an Israeli family business
- Oprah's Big Give, a reality television series hosted by Nate Berkus
- Operation Board Games, a 2003 federal fraud investigation
- O.B.G., Overmassive black hole galaxy
