= Public Official A =

"Public Official A" is a high-ranking public official alleged to be involved in political corruption during United States Attorney Patrick Fitzgerald's investigation of corruption in the State of Illinois. The identity of Public Official A has not been officially released and the official has not been indicted, but a judge has confirmed that the person is former Illinois Governor Rod Blagojevich.

== Speculation on the identity of Public Official A ==
In 2005, "Public Official A" was alleged to have selected consultants for private equity funds that appeared before the Illinois State Pension Funds via two close associates. Those associates - Stuart Levine and Tony Rezko - were indicted by Attorney Fitzgerald. This led to considerable public speculation in 2006 that Blagojevich was “Public Official A” and that he would therefore be a key subject of an ongoing criminal investigation.

A ruling on February 26, 2008, confirmed the suspicion that Blagojevich was “Public Official A” when a federal judge referenced Blagojevich's campaign as the beneficiary of the activity for which previous legal documents had used the non-specific term. According to the Associated Press, "News organizations including The Associated Press have long reported Blagojevich was Public Official A." After the ruling, Blagojevich continued to deny he was "Public Official A".

An NBC5.com news article confirms that Public Official A is indeed Governor Blagojevich.
