= Louanner Peters =

American politician

Louanner Peters is a former deputy governor of Illinois. She was appointed by then-Governor Rod Blagojevich in December 2006, becoming the first African-American woman to hold the position.

Peters grew up on a farm in Angie, Louisiana, and was the ninth of twelve children. She earned a Bachelor's degree in political science at Louisiana State University in 1971, and a Master's degree at the Jane Addams College of Social Work of the University of Illinois at Chicago in 1973. She served as chief of staff for U.S. Representative Gus Savage for 10 years starting in 1981. In 1992, she unsuccessfully ran as an independent candidate for Illinois's 2nd congressional district. She then did campaign work for Washington D.C. mayors Marion Barry and Anthony Williams, and for Blagojevich on a contractual basis. She was hired as Blagojevich's deputy chief of staff for social services in 2003, and was promoted to deputy governor in 2006.

According to an anonymous source, Peters is said to be the person referred to as "Senate Candidate 4" in the Blagojevich criminal complaint. In a private conversation, Blagojevich considered appointing Senate Candidate 4 to Barack Obama's U.S. Senate seat because he believed he could "count on [Senate Candidate 4], if things got hot, to give [the Senate seat] up and let me parachute over there."
