= Ed Genson =

American lawyer (1941–2020)

- Born: Edward Marvin Genson; June 30, 1941; Chicago, Illinois, U.S.
- Died: April 14, 2020 (aged 78); Chicago, Illinois, U.S.
- Education: Northwestern University (BA, JD)

Edward Marvin Genson (June 30, 1941 – April 14, 2020) was an American attorney who represented high-profile defendants such as former Republic Windows CEO Richard Gillman, musician R. Kelly, newspaper owner Conrad Black, and Illinois Governor Rod Blagojevich.

== Early life ==
Genson was born June 30, 1941. He was raised on the West Side of Chicago along with his younger sister, Myrna. He received a B.A. degree from Northwestern University in 1962 in political science, and a J.D. from Northwestern University School of Law in 1965.

== Career ==
=== Blagojevich Case ===
Genson was hired by Illinois Governor Rod Blagojevich after the Governor's arrest on corruption charges on December 9, 2008 and represented him at the impeachment hearings in the Illinois House of Representatives.

On January 23, 2009, after only a month on the case, Genson announced that he would step down as Blagojevich's lead defense attorney, stating that "I never require a client to do what I say but I do require them to at least listen to what I say."

=== Republic Windows & Doors ===
Genson was hired by former Republic Windows CEO Richard Gillman to represent him against the charges brought against him. In a surprise move, the judge set Gillman's bail at $10 million; a significantly higher amount than the Prosecution requested.

On Saturday September 25, Genson was able to get Gillman's bail cut in half and he was able to post bail.

== Personal life ==
Genson and his wife, Susan, had three children. Genson died April 15, 2020, at 78 from bile duct cancer.

Genson was affected by dystonia, a neuromuscular disorder that makes muscles contract involuntarily.

== Bibliography ==
- "Prosecutorial Courtroom Misconduct in Illinois", Loyola University of Chicago Law Journal, Fall 1987
- "A Guide to Handling Federal Narcotics Forfeiture Cases", Illinois Bar Journal, April 1991
- "Taped Evidence in Criminal Cases: Confronting the Tape Recorder", Litigation Magazine (American Bar Association), Winter 1994
