= Pat Byrnes =

American cartoonist

Pat Byrnes is an American cartoonist, humorist, illustrator, and former aerospace engineer, best known for his work in The New Yorker and for creating the syndicated comic strip Monkeyhouse. Byrnes is also a voiceover actor, award-winning advertising copywriter, and author of multiple books. He has twice received the National Cartoonists Society’s Silver Reuben Award for Gag Cartoons in 2017, after six nominations, and for Advertising Illustration in 2001.

== Biography ==
Byrnes was born in Detroit, Michigan.

He developed an early interest in cartooning and pursued a degree in aerospace engineering at the University of Notre Dame, motivated in part by the university's daily newspaper, which provided an outlet for his cartoons.

== Career ==
Byrnes has been a regular cartoonist for The New Yorker, contributing single-panel cartoons since the late 1990s.

=== Advertising and voice over work ===
Byrnes began his professional career as a copywriter for advertising agencies including W.B. Doner and J. Walter Thompson, winning several industry honors such as the Clio, Addy, and Mobius awards. He later worked as a voiceover actor, lending his voice to national campaigns for McDonald’s, Budweiser, Jeep, Cap’n Crunch, Raid!, and Quisp, among others.

=== Comic Strip and Books ===
Byrnes created the comic strip Monkeyhouse, a family-oriented series about a single father and his daughter. The strip concluded on the day of Byrnes’s wedding and was compiled into two anthologies.

He is also the author and illustrator of Captain Dad: The Manly Art of Stay-at-Home Parenting, What Would Satan Do? and Because I’m the Child Here and I Said So. He illustrated the American edition of Eats, Shoots & Leaves by Lynne Truss and contributed to The Rejection Collection I & II.

=== The New Yorker and Daily Cartoon ===
Byrnes has been a regular contributor to The New Yorker since the late 1990s. Though initially avoiding topical or political humor, he was encouraged by fellow cartoonist Ken Krimstein to take on The New Yorker’s Daily Cartoon during a politically volatile period in the U.S. His run as the solo Daily Cartoonist lasted ten weeks, during which he addressed contemporary events, particularly during the Trump administration.

His work is noted for its wit, satirical humor, and clean illustrative style. In addition to his magazine work, he has published collections of his cartoons and collaborated on illustrated books, most notably Eats, Shoots & Leaves: Illustrated Edition, which paired Truss’s original text with his humorous illustrations.

The assignment required rapid response to breaking news while maintaining The New Yorker’s stylistic standards avoiding labels, allegory, and overt caricature. Byrnes often relied on humor rooted in moral contradiction and absurdity. His cartoons from this period received significant attention, including a viral piece retweeted by author J.K. Rowling.

=== The Drawing Board ===
Byrnes is co-founder of The Drawing Board, a business consultancy that applies cartooning concepts to organizational problem-solving, including areas such as business ethics, culture change, and innovation. Clients of the consultancy have included Ethisphere, Mojang, the Red Cross Climate Centre, and the Conference Board.

=== Artistic Style ===
Byrnes is known for his character-driven humor, preference for evergreen gags over topical content, and interest in moral conflict as comedic subject matter. He draws inspiration from both classical cartooning and modern satire, often eschewing political allegory in favor of understated wit.

== Personal life ==
Byrnes is married to Lisa Madigan, who served as the Attorney General of Illinois from 2003 to 2019. His brother was Michael J. Byrnes, an American prelate of the Catholic Church who served as Archbishop of Agaña, Guam.
