= Operation Board Games =

Federal fraud investigation

Federal Fraud Scandal
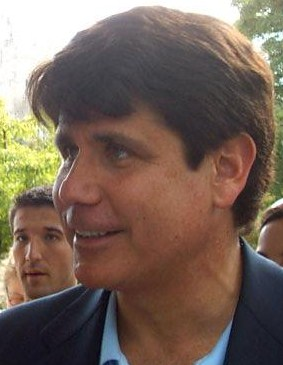
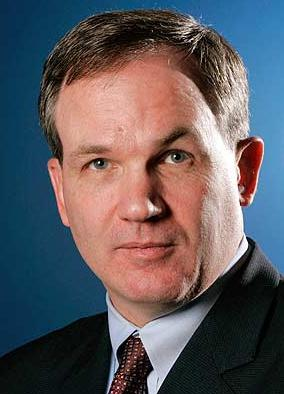
Illinois Governor Rod Blagojevich (left) had been under federal investigation by United States Attorney Patrick Fitzgerald (right) for over three years.

Operation Board Games is a federal fraud investigation initiated by United States Attorney Patrick Fitzgerald in December 2003, in order to investigate suspected fraud and extortion activity by Illinois Governor Rod Blagojevich. The investigation's name is a reference to two governing bodies in Illinois: one board controlling the Teacher's Pension System, and the second being the Health Facilities Planning Board.

== History ==
In summer 2006, Fitzgerald indicated that he was investigating allegations of "endemic hiring fraud" in state agencies under Blagojevich's control as part of the federal Operation Board Games probe. The effort was characterized at that time as locating "a number of credible witnesses" but Blagojevich was not accused of any unlawful activities. The May 2007 indictment of Chicago attorney Edward Vrdolyak for his "alleged involvement in a kickback scheme concerning the sale of a Chicago Gold Coast neighborhood building was another piece of the "Operation Board Games" investigation.

A total of fifteen individuals have also been indicted in the course of the investigation. The thirteenth indictment, of William F. Cellini, Sr., which is seemingly the last one before Blagojevich and Harris, occurred in October 2008:

A longtime political insider in Springfield was indicted today on federal corruption charges for allegedly conspiring with two Chicago businessmen and others to obtain political contributions for a certain public official by shaking down an investment firm that was seeking a $220 million allocation from the state Teachers Retirement System (TRS.)

— Randall Samborn, U.S. Department of Justice, October 30, 2008 Press Release

The focus of the investigation was on Blagojevich, which led to the Rod Blagojevich corruption charges. Blagojevich was convicted on 17 of 20 counts on June 27, 2011.
