= Lisa Madigan =

American lawyer and politician

- Madigan in 2026

41st Attorney General of Illinois
- In office January 13, 2003 – January 14, 2019
- Governor: Rod Blagojevich; Pat Quinn; Bruce Rauner
- Preceded by: Jim Ryan
- Succeeded by: Kwame Raoul

Member of the Illinois Senate from the 17th district
- In office January 13, 1999 – January 7, 2003
- Preceded by: Bruce A. Farley
- Succeeded by: Constituency abolished

Personal details
- Born: July 30, 1966 (age 60) Chicago, Illinois, U.S.
- Party: Democratic
- Spouse: Pat Byrnes
- Children: 2 daughters
- Parent: Michael Madigan (adoptive father)
- Education: Georgetown University (BA); Loyola University, Chicago (JD)

Lisa Murray Madigan (born July 30, 1966) is an American lawyer and politician. A member of the Democratic Party, she served as the 41st attorney general of Illinois from 2003 to 2019, being the first woman to hold that position. She is the adopted daughter of Michael Madigan, who served as Speaker of the Illinois House of Representatives from 1983 to 1995 and from 1997 to 2021.

Madigan did not seek re-election as the state's attorney general in 2018, and was succeeded by State Senator Kwame Raoul.

== Education and early career ==
Madigan attended the Latin School of Chicago for her secondary education. In 1988, she received her bachelor's degree from Georgetown University and later a Juris Doctor (J.D.) degree from Loyola University Chicago School of Law.

Prior to becoming an attorney, Madigan worked as a teacher and community organizer, developing after-school programs to help keep kids involved in education and away from drugs and gangs. Madigan also volunteered as a high school teacher in South Africa during apartheid. Madigan later worked as a litigator for the Chicago law firm of Sachnoff & Weaver (now Reed Smith LLP).

== Political career ==
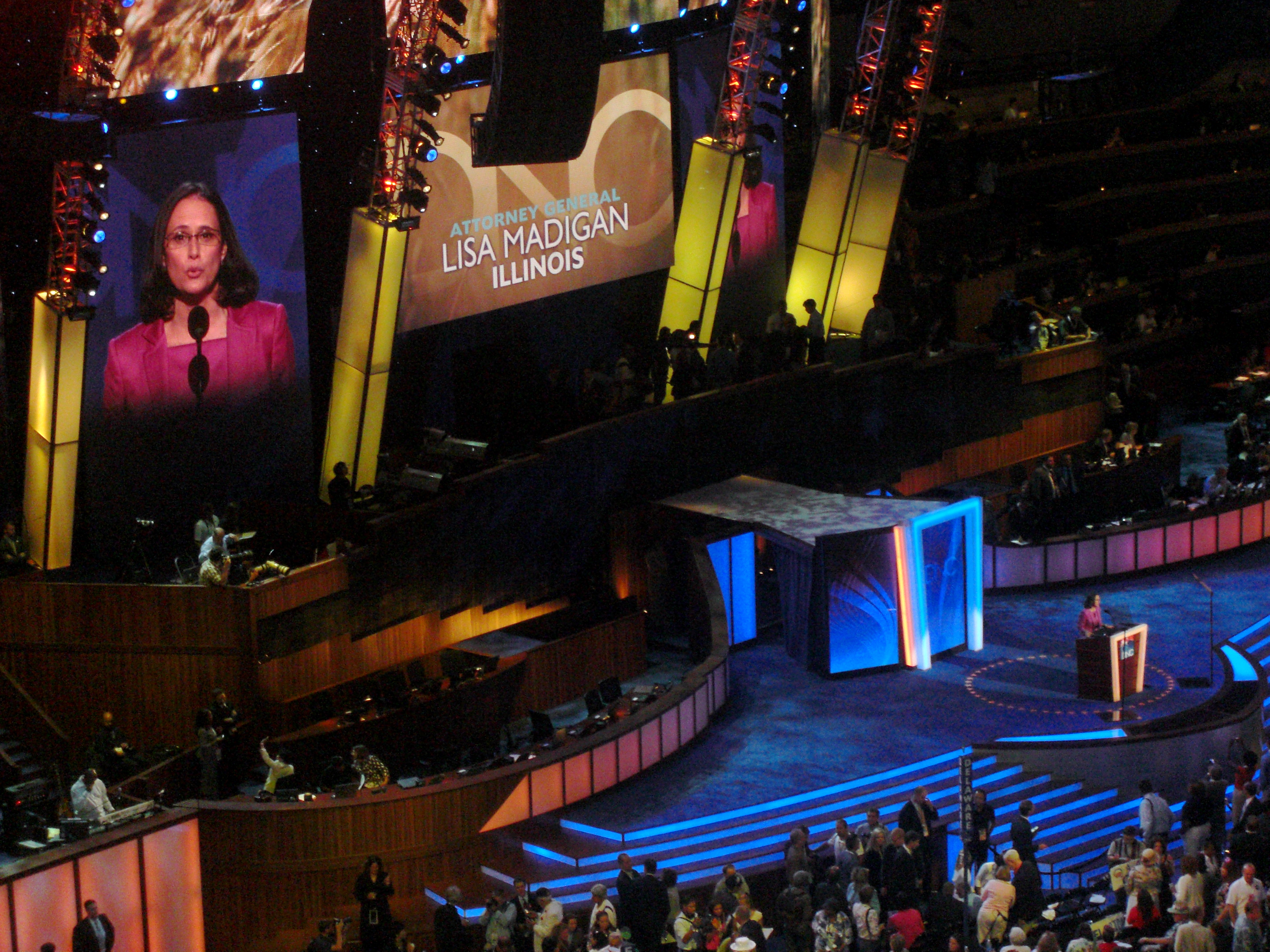
Madigan speaks on the first day of the 2008 Democratic National Convention in Denver, Colorado.

In 1998, at the age of 32, Madigan ran for Illinois state senator for the 17th District. She handily beat her primary opponent with 66% of the vote and ran unopposed in the general election. She served in that office from 1998 through 2003. She and Barack Obama served in the Senate together, sat next to each other, and their offices were next to each other's. She sat on the judiciary committee.

In 2002, Madigan ran for Attorney General of Illinois and narrowly defeated DuPage County State's Attorney Joe Birkett with 50.4% of the vote.

In 2004, Madigan became the first Illinois Attorney General in more than 25 years to personally argue a case before the United States Supreme Court. She successfully argued Illinois v. Caballes, where the court reaffirmed the ability of police officers to use specially trained dogs without a search warrant or probable cause to detect the presence of illegal drugs during traffic stops.

Madigan was one of many Illinois politicians with strained relationships with now-convicted former Illinois Governor Rod Blagojevich. (See Rod Blagojevich controversies.) Her father Michael Madigan, Speaker of the Illinois House of Representatives previously had a feud with Blagojevich, as highlighted by TIME magazine. On December 12, 2008, Madigan attracted national attention after filing a motion with the Supreme Court of Illinois to temporarily remove Governor Rod Blagojevich from office and install Lt. Gov. Pat Quinn. Although that court denied that motion without a hearing, Blagojevich was subsequently impeached and removed from office by the Illinois General Assembly, and Quinn was sworn in as governor. Blagojevich was later convicted in Federal court on 18 counts and sentenced to 14 years' imprisonment, based on the blatancy of his attempts to use his office for personal gain. Although the U.S. Court of Appeals for the 7th Circuit and U.S. Supreme Court upheld his convictions, on a subsequent appeal, the 7th Circuit threw out 5 of the convictions in 2015, but Blagojevich was resentenced to the same lengthy term of imprisonment.

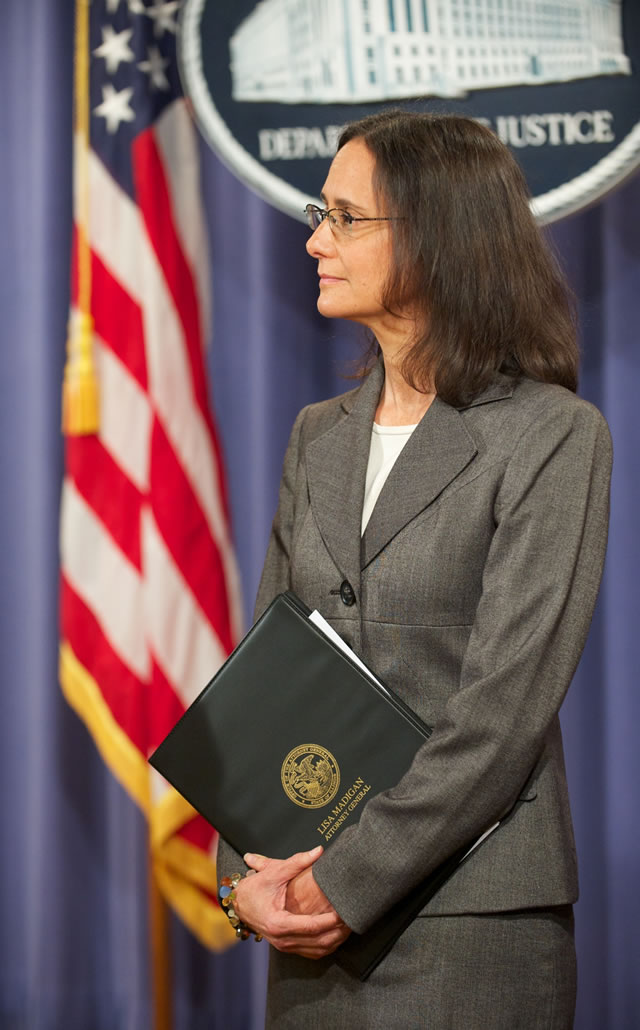
Illinois Attorney General Madigan in a briefing about a Wells Fargo lawsuit in 2012

In 2006, Madigan won re-election with 72.4% of the vote against Tazewell County State's Attorney Stewart "Stu" Umholtz.

In 2008, Madigan was considered a potential candidate for Governor of Illinois or the United States Senate. However, on July 8, 2009, Madigan announced she was running for reelection as Illinois Attorney General instead of seeking higher office in 2010. Although she was also considered a possible replacement for Barack Obama's Senate seat following his victory in the 2008 presidential election, Madigan described her chances of being appointed as "less than zero." Instead, Illinois governor Rod Blagojevich appointed Roland Burris to fill that term, which appointment gave rise to the Blagojevich Senate appointment scandal and ultimately led to his federal convictions. Many speculated Madigan was "Senate Candidate #2" in the complaint against Blagojevich, although no wrongdoing on her part was implied.

She was widely believed to have the ambition to pursue a higher political office. In 2008 The New York Times named her among the seventeen most likely women to become the first female President of the United States. However, on July 15, 2013, Madigan, who was widely expected to run for governor of Illinois in 2014, announced she would not run because of her father's decision to stay in his post as speaker of the Illinois House. Instead, she ran for reelection as state attorney general and won.

On September 15, 2017, Madigan announced she would not seek reelection in 2018.

In September 2019, Lisa Madigan joined Kirkland & Ellis as litigation partner.

== Awards and honors ==
- 2005, received the John F. Kennedy New Frontier Award, presented to "exceptional young Americans under the age of 40 whose contributions in elective office, community service or advocacy demonstrate the impact and value of public service in the spirit of John F. Kennedy."

== Personal life ==
Madigan was born Lisa Murray. She changed her name when she was 18 and was formally adopted in her 20s by Michael Madigan. Madigan is married to cartoonist Pat Byrnes, and they have two daughters.

== Electoral history ==
- 2014 election for Attorney General

Illinois Attorney General election, 2014
Party	Candidate	Votes	%	±%
Democratic	Lisa Madigan (incumbent)	2,142,558	59.46%	−5.26%
Republican	Paul Schimpf	1,360,763	37.77%	+6.12%
Libertarian	Ben Koyl	99,903	2.77%	+1.30%
Total votes		3,603,224	100.0%	
Democratic hold				

- 2010 election for Attorney General

Illinois Attorney General election, 2010
Party	Candidate	Votes	%
Democratic	Lisa Madigan (incumbent)	2,397,723	64.72
Republican	Steve Kim	1,172,427	31.65
Green	David F. Black	80,004	2.16
Libertarian	Bill Malan	54,532	1.47
Total votes		3,704,686	100
Democratic hold			

- 2006 election for Attorney General

Illinois Attorney General election, 2006
Party	Candidate	Votes	%
Democratic	Lisa Madigan (incumbent)	2,521,113	72.45
Republican	Stewart Umholtz	843,903	24.25
Green	David F. Black	114,796	3.30
Total votes		3,479,812	100
Democratic hold			

- 2002 Democratic primary election for Attorney General

Illinois Attorney General election, 2002
Party	Candidate	Votes	%
Democratic	Lisa Madigan	1,762,949	50.39
Republican	Joe Birkett	1,648,003	47.10
Libertarian	Gary L. Shilts	87,949	2.51
Total votes		3,498,901	100
Democratic gain from Republican			

- 1998 election for State Senator, 17th District

- Lisa Madigan (D), 100%
- Marc Loveless (W-I), 0%

- 1998 Democratic primary election for State Senator, 17th District

- Lisa Madigan, 66%
- Bruce Farley, 31%

== See also ==
- Barack Obama Supreme Court candidates
- List of female state attorneys general in the United States

Party political offices
Preceded by Miriam Santos	Democratic nominee for Attorney General of Illinois; 2002, 2006, 2010, 2014	Succeeded by Kwame Raoul
Legal offices
Preceded by Jim Ryan	Attorney General of Illinois; 2003–2019	Succeeded by Kwame Raoul
