= Tony Rezko =

American businessman, political fundraiser, restaurateur and real estate developer

Antoin Rezko (born 1955) is an American businessman who was convicted of wire fraud.

Rezko was largely a fundraiser for the Illinois Democratic and some Republican politicians. After becoming a major contributor to Rod Blagojevich's successful election for governor, Rezko assisted Blagojevich in setting up the state's first Democratic administration in twenty years and as a result he was able to have business associates appointed onto several state boards. Rezko and several others were indicted on federal charges in October 2006 for using their connections on the state boards to demand kickbacks from businesses that wished to engage in dealings with the state. While the others pleaded guilty, Rezko pleaded not guilty and was tried. He was found guilty of 16 of the 24 charges filed against him and on November 23, 2011, he was sentenced to 10.5 years in prison.

== Early life and education ==
Tony Rezko was born in 1955 in Aleppo, Syria, to a prominent Assyrian Syriac Catholic family. After graduating from college there, Rezko moved to Chicago and earned undergraduate and master's degrees in civil engineering from the Illinois Institute of Technology in the late 1970s. He designed nuclear power plants at an engineering company, and then worked for the Illinois Department of Transportation designing highways, where he earned $21,590 in his first year.

== Career ==
While he was an engineer, Rezko started buying vacant lots and developing single family residences. He also began investing in fast-food restaurants, including the first Subway in Chicago. Many properties were in lower-income African American neighborhoods where he met Jabir Herbert (J.H.) Muhammad, former manager of heavyweight champion Muhammad Ali and son of the late Nation of Islam leader, Elijah Muhammad. Rezko was asked in 1983 to support the successful mayoral candidacy of African-American Harold Washington. J.H. Muhammad's company, Crucial Concessions, hired Rezko in 1984 and won a food contract on Lake Michigan beaches and in many Chicago South Side parks. Rezko put together endorsement deals for Ali, became the executive director of the Muhammad Ali Foundation, and traveled the world with Ali for five years.

In 1997, Crucial Concessions opened two Panda Express Restaurants at O'Hare, under the city's minority set-aside program. It lost those franchises in 2005, on the grounds that J.H. Muhammad was merely a front man for Rezko, who had been appointed trustee of Elijah Muhammad's affairs in the early 1990s. In March 2008 Muhammad sued Rezko, alleging that he had been swindled out of his home and business interests.

In January 1989, Rezko and attorney Daniel Mahru, CEO of a firm that leased ice makers to bars and hotels, founded a real-estate development and restaurant holding corporation called Rezmar Corporation. Between 1989 and 1998, Rezmar rehabilitated 30 buildings, a total of 1,025 apartments, spending more than $100 million from the city, state and federal governments and bank loans. Rezko and Mahru weren't responsible for any government or bank loans or the $50 million in federal tax credits they got to rehab the buildings. Rezmar put just $100 into each project and got a 1% stake as the general partner in charge of hiring the architect, contractor, and the company that would manage the buildings. They selected Chicago Property Management, also owned by Rezko and Mahru, to manage the buildings, including selecting the tenants and making repairs. Rezmar also got upfront development fees of at least $6.9 million in all. Under its deals with the Chicago Equity Fund, Rezmar promised to cover all operating losses in any building for seven years, but had no obligation after that, although the Federal Government could recover the tax credits that Rezmar sold from the holders if the projects did not survive for fifteen years or more. By 1998 the company had a net worth of US$34 million and it then turned to purchasing old factories and parcels of land in gentrifying areas of Chicago and turning them into upscale condominium complexes. Rezko was named "Entrepreneur of the Decade" by the Arab-American Business and Professional Association.

Rezko's investment in restaurant food chains had started with a chain of Panda Express Chinese restaurants. In 1998, Rezko opened his first chain of Papa John's Pizza restaurants in Chicago and by 2002, he had twenty-six stores in Chicago, at least fifteen in Wisconsin, and seven in Detroit, part of the financing for these stores was through GE Capital. By 2001, Rezko began to fall behind on his franchise payments and loans and he transferred the franchises to several business associates. In 2006, during a lawsuit with Papa John's over his franchise fees, Rezko renamed his Papa John's restaurants to Papa Tony's. Rezko also had a lien filed against his home after losing a civil lawsuit to GE Capital.

As his business ventures began failing, Rezko entered into several partnership with Iraqi-born business executive Nadhmi Auchi, including a massive 2005 real estate development project on Chicago's South Loop whose value was pegged by an observer familiar with the deal at $130.5 million. In 2008, Rezko was imprisoned for his failure to disclose a $3.5m loan from Auchi.

== Criminal charges and imprisonment ==
=== Public corruption charges ===
In October 2006, Rezko was indicted along with businessman Stuart Levine on charges of wire fraud, bribery, money laundering, and attempted extortion as a result of a federal investigation known as "Operation Board Games." Levine was once a top Republican fund-raiser who had switched loyalty. Rezko and Levine were charged with attempting to extort millions of dollars from businesses seeking to do business with the Illinois Teachers System Board and the Illinois Health Facilities Planning Board from 2002 to 2004. Levine pleaded guilty and agreed to testify against Rezko and others. While the charges carry a maximum sentence of life in prison, Levine expected to receive about a 5-1/2 year sentence in return for his testimony. The case was prosecuted by Patrick Fitzgerald.

Rezko pleaded not guilty, and the trial related to his charges from Operation Board Games began on March 6, 2008. He was jailed shortly before the trial began when he received a $3.5 million wire transfer from Lebanon. Rezko had told the court that he had no access to money from overseas. Ten weeks into the trial, on April 18, Judge Amy St. Eve released Rezko, after friends and relatives put up 30 properties valued at about $8.5 million to secure his bond. Prosecutors opposed the motion for release, saying that Rezko was a flight risk. On May 6, both the prosecution and the defense rested their cases. Government prosecutors spent 8 weeks presenting their case. Rezko's lawyer, Joseph J. Duffy, chose not to present any witnesses, saying that he did not believe that the prosecution had proven the charges. Prosecutors contended that they had shown Rezko's "corrupt use of his power and influence" to gain benefits for himself and his friends. Duffy argued that the prosecution had exaggerated Rezko's influence in state government, and attacked Levine's credibility as a witness.

The case went to the jury on May 13 and after three weeks of deliberation, the jury found Rezko guilty of six counts of wire fraud, six counts of mail fraud, two counts of corrupt solicitation, and two counts of money laundering, but found him not guilty on three counts of wire and mail fraud, one count of attempted extortion, and four counts of corrupt solicitation. According to CBS News the "high-profile federal trial provided an unusually detailed glimpse of the pay-to-play politics that has made Illinois infamous."

While the jury was deliberating on the Board Games trial, an arrest warrant was issued in Las Vegas for passing bad checks in two casinos and failing to pay $450,000 in gambling debts that were accrued between March and July 2006. Another casino had also filed a civil complaint for a total of $331,000 in 2006 and was given a judgment of default in 2007.

=== Charges related to private business dealings ===
Rezko was indicted, along with a business associate, for wire fraud related to the alleged sale of his pizza business to a straw buyer at an inflated price in order to obtain millions of dollars in loans from GE Capital. Rezko initially pleaded not guilty to these charges. In 2011, Rezko changed his plea to guilty. As part of a plea deal and his agreement to drop his appeal of his previous conviction, Rezko pleaded guilty to wire fraud and was given a 7 1/2-year sentence to run concurrently with the 10 1/2-year sentence that he was then serving for his previous conviction.

=== Imprisonment and release from federal prison ===
Rezko was taken into federal custody on 4 June 2008 and imprisoned in various county jails and a federal lockup from then until around 2011/12, when he was transferred to a medium security prison in Pekin.

In 2012 a telephone interview, from prison, Rezko maintained his innocence of the fraud, money laundering and bribery charges, while admitting to other matters.

On 7 July 2015 Rezko was released from federal prison to a halfway house in Chicago. He had, by then, served seven years and one month (including time served before his second conviction) of a ten-and-a-half year sentence.

== Ties to politicians ==
=== Ties to Rod Blagojevich ===
Rezko's relationship with Illinois Governor Rod Blagojevich and his family were at the root of the federal corruption case which led to Rezko's conviction. Rezko donated $117,652 to Blagojevich's campaigns, and is credited by the prosecutor in his trial with having delivered bundled contributions totalling almost $1.44 million. Since 1997, Blagojevich's wife, Patricia, has made at least $38,000 acting as Rezko's real-estate agent on several of his company's property acquisitions. When Blagojevich won the Illinois gubernatorial election in 2002, Rezko assisted Blagojevich in setting up the state's first Democratic administration in twenty years. Rezko recommended many of his business associates and their relatives for positions within state government, three of whom were appointed to the state board that oversees hospital projects. the state's development board was run by another former Rezko business associate. Rezko and Republican fundraiser Stuart Levine were charged in a 24-count federal indictment for allegedly using Rezko's influence with public officials to demand millions of dollars in kickbacks from companies that wanted to do business with the state. Levine pleaded guilty and served as the chief witness against Rezko at trial. Levine and several other witnesses implicated Blagojevich in the schemes.

The last indictment in Operation Board Games before Blagojevich himself was indicted was that of William F. Cellini who was indicted for conspiring with Rezko to shake down Chicago-based Capri Capital to get a substantial contribution to Blagojevich in exchange for allowing Capri to manage $220 million in the Teachers Retirement System. After Thomas Rosenberg of Capri threatened to tell authorities, the plan was abandoned. Capri has substantial investments in the Watergate complex and King Abdullah Economic City.

=== Ties to Barack Obama ===
In 1990, after Barack Obama was elected president of the Harvard Law Review, He interviewed with Rezmar Corp. Rezko did not decide to hire him however exclaimed he'd have a great shot at politics. Obama instead took a job with the firm of Davis, Miner, Barnhill & Galland, which primarily worked on civil rights cases. The firm also represented Rezmar and helped the company get more than $43 million in government funding. The firm's former senior partner, Allison S. Davis, later went into business with Rezko and, in 2003, was appointed to the Illinois State Board of Investment by Governor Blagojevich at Rezko's request. On July 31, 1995, the first ever political contributions to Obama were $300 from a lawyer, a $5,000 loan from a car dealer, and $2,000 from two food companies owned by Rezko. Starting in 2003, Rezko was one of the people on Obama's U.S. Senate campaign finance committee, which raised more than $14 million. Rezko organized an early fundraiser for Obama that Chicago Tribune reporter David Mendell claims was instrumental in providing Obama with seed money for his U.S. Senate race. Obama in 2007-2008 identified over $250,000 in campaign contributions to various Obama campaigns as coming from Rezko or close associates, and said that he donated almost two-thirds of that amount to nonprofit groups.

==== Real estate dealings ====
In 2005 Obama purchased a new home in the Kenwood District of Chicago for $1.65 million (which was $300,000 below the asking price but represented the highest offer on the property) on the same day that Rezko's wife, Rita Rezko, purchased the adjoining empty lot from the same sellers for the full asking price. Obama acknowledged bringing his interest in the property to Rezko's attention, but denied any coordination of offers. According to Obama, while the properties had originally been a single property, the previous owners decided to sell the land as two separate lots, but made it a condition of the sales that they be closed on the same date. Obama also stated that the properties had been on the market for months, that his offer was the better of two bids, and that Ms. Rezko's bid was matched by another offer, also of $625,000, so that she could not have purchased the property for less.

After it had been reported in 2006 that Rezko was under federal investigation for influence-peddling, Obama purchased a 10-foot-wide strip of Ms. Rezko's property for $104,500, $60,000 above the assessed value. According to Chicago Sun-Times columnist, Mark Brown, "Rezko definitely did Obama a favor by selling him the 10-foot strip of land, making his own parcel less attractive for development." Obama acknowledges that the exchange may have created the appearance of impropriety and stated "I consider this a mistake on my part and I regret it."

On December 28, 2006, Mrs. Rezko sold the property to a company owned by her husband's former business attorney. That sale of $575,000, combined with the earlier $104,500 sale to the Obamas, amounted to a net profit of $54,500 over her original purchase, less $14,000 for a fence along the property line and other expenses. In October 2007, the new owners put the still vacant land up for sale again, this time for $1.5 million.

==== Obama's letters ====
In June 2007, the Sun-Times published a story about letters Obama had written in 1997 to city and state officials in support of a low-income senior citizen development project headed by Rezko and Davis. The project received more than $14 million in taxpayer funds, including $885,000 in development fees for Rezko and Davis. Of Obama's letters in support of the Cottage View Terrace apartments development, Obama spokesman Bill Burton said, "This wasn't done as a favor for anyone; it was done in the interests of the people in the community who have benefited from the project. I don't know that anyone specifically asked him to write this letter nine years ago. There was a consensus in the community about the positive impact the project would make and Obama supported it because it was going to help people in his district." Rezko's attorney responded that "Mr. Rezko never spoke with, nor sought a letter from, Senator Obama in connection with that project.

In the South Carolina Democratic Party presidential debate on January 21, 2008, Senator Hillary Clinton said that Obama had been associated with Rezko, whom she referred to as a slum landlord. The Los Angeles Times indicated that its own review showed Rezko played a deeper role in Obama's political and financial biography than Obama has acknowledged. Within days of the debate, a photo of Rezko posing with Bill and Hillary Clinton surfaced. When asked about the photo, Hillary Clinton commented: "I probably have taken hundreds of thousands of pictures. I wouldn't know him if he walked in the door."

=== Ties to other politicians ===
Rezko's first significant political act was hosting a fundraiser for Harold Washington during Washington's successful campaign to become Chicago's mayor. He has since raised funds for many other politicians. In addition to Blagojevich and Obama, prominent Democrats that Rezko or his company, Rezmar, have contributed money to, or fund-raised for, are Congressman Luis Gutierrez, a friend for over two decades, Comptroller Dan Hynes, Attorney General Lisa Madigan, Lieutenant Governor Pat Quinn, former Chicago Mayors Daley and Washington, and former Cook County Board President John Stroger. Rezko has also raised money for Republicans, including former Illinois Governors Jim Edgar and George Ryan. The late Rosemont, Illinois, Mayor Donald Stephens and Rezko co-chaired a multimillion-dollar fund-raiser for President George W. Bush in 2003. Rezko headed the 2002 campaign finance committee for Stroger. Stroger appointed Rezko's wife, Rita, to the Cook County Employee Appeals Board, which hears cases brought by fired or disciplined workers. The part-time post pays $37,000 a year. A Rezko company had a contract to maintain pay telephones at the Cook County Jail under Stroger. The Chicago Sun-Times puts Rezko's contributions to Stroger at $148,300.
