= John F. Harris (political aide) =

Chief of Staff to the Illinois Governor
- In office 2005 – December 12, 2008
- Governor: Rod Blagojevich

Budget Director to the Mayor of Chicago
- In office 1996–2005
- Leader: Richard M. Daley

Personal details
- Born: February 17, 1962 (age 64) Chicago, Illinois, U.S.
- Party: Democratic
- Education: Northwestern University; Loyola University Chicago School of Law

John F. Harris (born February 17, 1962) is an American political aide and former chief of staff to the Governor of Illinois, Rod Blagojevich. He resigned in December 2008 after being charged, along with Blagojevich, with wire fraud.

== Biography ==
Harris graduated from Northwestern University in Evanston, Illinois in 1984. He attended Loyola University Chicago School of Law and graduated in 1987.

From 1984 to 1992, Harris served as an intelligence officer and judge advocate general in the United States Army. He resigned his commission in 1992 and subsequently joined the administration of Chicago mayor Richard M. Daley, where he served in many senior management positions and ultimately as budget director from 1996 to 2005. Among his many accomplishments, Harris negotiated and launched the multi-billion-dollar O'Hare International Airport modernization program and led the city's successful transaction to sell the Chicago Skyway for $1.8 billion to the private capital joint venture team of Cintra/Macquarie. In 2005, Harris joined the administration of the Governor of Illinois as chief of staff, Rod Blagojevich.

=== Involvement with Rod Blagojevich ===
On December 9, 2008, Harris and his boss Governor Rod Blagojevich were arrested and charged with conspiracy to commit mail and wire fraud as well as solicitation of bribery. Harris resigned days later. Harris would enter a guilty plea soon after his arrest and was granted a deal after he agreed to testify against Blagojevich.

In a subsequent decision by the U.S. Court of Appeals for the Seventh Circuit regarding the convictions of former Governor Blagojevich, the court reversed a conviction for the former governor based on the wire fraud count which had been the sole basis of Harris' guilty plea. The court noted that the practice of "logrolling" for political purposes, including the trading of favors like jobs, was not criminal activity. This has led legal and political commentators to speculate that Harris may have pleaded guilty to conduct which was not criminal at all. However, it is unclear if Harris is left with any legal remedy to clear himself.

On March 28, 2012, Harris was sentenced by judge James B. Zagel. In contrast to the 14-year sentence Judge Zagel previously handed down to former Governor Blagojevich, Harris was sentenced to a period of 10 days' incarceration, two years' supervised release and a $1,000 fine. In imposing the unusually lenient sentence, Judge Zagel noted that the former Governor had worn down his staff and demonstrated signs of "mental instability." Judge Zagel observed that other than leaving the administration earlier if he were in Harris's shoes, he might have acted the same way. The judge also acknowledged an unusual number of character reference letters in support of Harris that had been received from prominent city and state political and business figures.
