= William F. Cellini =

American businessman and felon

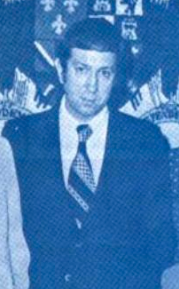
- Cellini in 1975
- Born: November 5, 1934 (age 91)
- Years active: 1958–present

William F. Cellini (born November 5, 1934) is an American businessman and felon. He co-founded the New Frontier Companies, a group of Illinois-based real estate companies with headquarters in Chicago. He was previously the chairman of the NYSE-listed Argosy Gaming Company, was the treasurer of the Sangamon County Republican Party, and has held several public offices within the state of Illinois.

Cellini has served on the boards of Lakeside Bank of Chicago, the Illinois National Bank of Springfield, Roosevelt National Life Insurance Company, Illinois College Board of Trustees, and the Boys & Girls Club of Springfield, Illinois. He was the statewide chairman of the USO, and has appeared on numerous professional panels for the road-building industry. In 2007 he received the Bradley University Department of Engineering Outstanding Achievement Award. He is a member of the Lanphier High School Hall of Fame. From 1957 to 1988, Cellini served in the Illinois National Guard and retired under the rank of colonel after 31 years of service. He was convicted on federal corruption charges in 2011.

== Early life and family ==
William Cellini was born in Springfield, Illinois. His family lived and worked in the blue-collar North End of the city. From the 1930s until the 1960s, the neighborhood where he lived was an enclave of Southern and Eastern European families. Most fathers on his block were coal miners or they worked in Springfield's factories. Cellini's father started out as a coal miner until age 22 when he became a 37-year member of the Springfield Police Department. During Cellini's childhood, his mother took in laundry and worked as a waitress at their family's restaurant.

Cellini was president of his graduating grade school class, and he attended Lanphier High School in Springfield, graduating in 1952. He was the first member of his immediate family to attend college, earning a degree in physics from Illinois College in 1958. In 1960, he served on the faculty at Niantic-Harristown High School in Niantic, Illinois, where he taught physics, algebra and English. To help pay his way through college, Cellini played dances in Central Illinois with his own bands, The Hi-Fis and the Bill Cellini Orchestra. His first professional music job was in 1953.

Cellini married Julianna Cellini, a former reporter. They are the parents of a son and daughter.

Cellini plays piano and had a dance band that played throughout the Midwest from 1953 to 1969. He was elected chairman of the American Federation of Musicians Local 19.

== Career ==
In 1959, Cellini ran for his first public office as police magistrate of Springfield but lost his bid for election. Cellini went on to lose another election for circuit clerk of Sangamon County, Illinois, but eventually won a seat on the Sangamon County Board of Supervisors in 1961. In 1963, he was elected to serve on the Springfield City Council as Commissioner of Public Works. At 28, he was the youngest man ever elected to the Springfield City Council and the youngest to head its public works department. He was re-elected in 1967 having no opposition.

In 1969, Governor Richard B. Ogilvie appointed William Cellini to be the Director of Public Works and Buildings for Illinois. In 1971, he was appointed Illinois' first Secretary of Transportation and directed several thousand employees while administering an annual budget of over a billion dollars in public works programs.

In April 1972, the Illinois State Senate unanimously confirmed Cellini as the first secretary of the newly created Illinois Department of Transportation, putting him in charge of 10,000 employees and a budget of more than $1.5 billion. The election of Democrat Dan Walker as Governor the following year ended Cellini's career in state government.

Beginning in 1974, Cellini embarked on a long and successful career in the private sector. With his business partner Larry Haddad, he co-founded the New Frontier Companies, a full service real estate development firm, and in addition, Cellini became executive director of the Illinois Asphalt Pavement Association.

Cellini remained politically active in the private sector serving as Treasurer of the Sangamon County Republican Central Committee in Springfield. In the mid-1970s, he was appointed by the President of the United States to serve on the National Highway Safety Advisory Committee and in 1976 at the age of 41, Cellini was a delegate to the Republican National Convention in Kansas City, Missouri where from the floor of the convention hall he seconded the nomination of Gerald R. Ford for President by giving a brief speech he wrote on the back of a campaign sign.

In 1977, Cellini and Haddad formed New Frontier Management Corporation, a company that has overseen the management, rent-up and asset management of over 17,000 housing units throughout the United States. In 1985, New Frontier Management opened the President Abraham Lincoln Hotel, in Springfield, Illinois. In 1989 he founded Pacific Management Inc., from which he is now retired. In addition to these business ventures, Cellini took an active role in commercial product design by inventing and patenting two types of Shower Enlarger curtain rods which maximize bathtub showering space and are currently used in many hotels across the United States.

From 1973 to 2010, Cellini served as the executive director of the Illinois Asphalt Pavement Association, the Illinois Association of Wastewater Agencies, the Illinois Concrete Pipe Association and, he held a membership position in the PCI of Illinois and Wisconsin. He has since retired from all of these entities.

== Argosy Gaming ==
In 1990, Cellini and group of ten entrepreneurs created Metro Entertainment and Tourism to obtain the first casino license in Illinois. The group was successful in winning the license and went on to create the Alton Riverboat Gambling Partnership in Alton, Illinois. This partnership included tennis star Jimmy Connors. After an extensive government vetting and qualifying process, Cellini became the co-founder of Argosy Gaming Company in 1999, a New York Stock Exchange traded entity. The company's first gambling license cost the company $85,000 but later blossomed into a value of $500 million with six casinos.

== Commonwealth Realty Advisors ==
In 1989, William Cellini and Earl Deutsch founded Commonwealth Realty Advisors (CRA). The firm was a highly successful real-estate investment company focused on asset management of commercial real estate. Its clients included union and public pension funds and its most successful client was the Teachers Retirement System of Illinois (TRS). According to numbers confirmed by TRS, the retirement system earned a 14.38% return during CRA's 17 year management. So successful was their management of assets that the executive director of TRS publicly commended CRA's performance as one of the pension fund's top-performing real-estate managers. CRA earned double-digit returns for teachers' system over a period of 17 years and grew to manage approximately $2 billion in gross assets before its closure in 2009.

In the fall of 2006, TRS said that Commonwealth was one of the system's biggest moneymakers, earning the pension fund about 20 percent over the previous five years. "They have made a ton of money for us," TRS executive director Jon Bauman told The State Journal-Register at the time. "They're probably our top-performing real-estate manager."

CRA earned double-digit returns for the system and grew to manage approximately $2 billion in gross assets before its closure in 2009 while returning approximately $1 billion in distributions to the fund. TRS officials confirmed that the teachers earned a 14.38% return during CRA's 17 year management.

== Legal issues and outcome ==
In October 2008, Cellini was indicted on charges of conspiring with convicted fundraiser Tony Rezko to obtain money in exchange for campaign contributions to a public official who at the time was believed to be Illinois' Governor Rod Blagojevich. In addition to Cellini and Rezko, Stuart P. Levine and another unnamed co-conspirator were including in the indictment. The indictment described a plan that involved campaign contribution money from the Chicago investment firm Capri Capital through the cooperation of one of its owner, Thomas Rosenberg.

In a separate trial, Tony Rezko was acquitted of similar charges related to an extortion plot involving Rosenberg and Capri Capital.

Cellini's attorney Dan Webb released a statement saying that his client, "is completely innocent of these charges, and he will fight this case because he has done absolutely nothing wrong. Bill has lived an exemplary life as a successful businessman and devoted husband and father, and he will not allow his reputation to be damaged by these unfair and unjust charges. Bill is confident that a jury will find him not guilty.".

In October 2011 in Chicago, prosecution and defense brought forth their cases in a Federal Court presided over by Judge James Zagel. While the prosecution provided an array of evidence against Cellini (mostly relying on Levine's testimony), Levine's credibility was called into question. Described by both sides as having committed crimes including drug use and dealing, Levine had not yet served a single day in prison presumably due to his cooperation with the authorities.

While under questioning by the Assistant U.S. Attorney, Levine gave mostly monotone answers about his past malfeasance while on the board of the Illinois Teachers' Retirement System - TRS. At one point on the stand, Levine became flustered when his cell phone rang and he struggled to silence it.

Under cross-examination Levine's conduct changed. He stalled continuously when recalling his own testimony hours prior. He appeared disoriented, pausing for 10 seconds or longer as the courtroom grew quiet. When the defense asked Levine about the amounts of money he stole, the institutions he cheated, and how he felt about his actions, Levine had no answers.

Thomas Rosenberg was granted immunity in exchange for his testimony after cooperating with the FBI. Prosecutors portrayed Rosenberg as an un-willing participant in the political contribution scheme. This stood in direct contrast to Levine's sworn testimony about Rosenberg's own influence. Yet at times, Rosenberg aided Cellini's case by testifying that Cellini had never asked him to make a political contribution nor asked him for money at any time during their acquaintanceship. "Never in 30 years," Rosenberg said of Cellini. Rosenberg also claimed Levine never wanted money from him.

While prosecutors contended Cellini was at the center of a plot to extort Thomas Rosenberg, the defense countered that Cellini was used by Levine and was made a scapegoat by the government. The prosecution emphasized the FBI-recorded calls between Levine and Cellini and claimed, because Cellini was talking on the phone during the time of the alleged extortion plot, it made him a willing member of the plot. The defense contended that while Cellini talked to Levine, his conversation never delivered an extortion message. "I want you to read every page of this transcript," Webb told jurors. "Cellini does not pass on the extortion message. It's not there."

Evidence in court showed that the government never recorded such a call and that out of all the calls the government recorded, it did not record any whereby Levine allegedly told Cellini to deliver the extortion threat to Rosenberg. "We have no tape recording," Webb said. "We have nothing but Levine's testimony."

Webb also explained Cellini wasn't in meetings when a supposed conspiracy was being planned. "'[He] didn't know what took place during them and would never have received any money as a result of the conspiracy."

On November 1, 2011, the jury found Cellini guilty on two counts.

After the conviction, Dan Webb filed a motion for a mistrial based on the premise a juror showed bias towards the legal system by concealing several felony records during pre-trial questioning. On January 24, 2012, Judge Zagel denied the mistrial request claiming the juror showed no legal evidence of bias.

Judge James Zagel handed-down a sentence of twelve months and one day incarceration. Zagel also commented to the court how in his years on the bench, he'd never seen so many letters written on behalf of a defendant. Zagel also considered Cellini's health as well as the 364 letters he received detailing Cellini's acts of kindness to people who had no way of repaying him, and his many years of service to the community as "a significant mitigating factor" in determining the sentence. Cellini reported to an Indiana Federal Prison in 2013.

Following sentencing, the Jacksonville Journal-Courier exclaimed, "If this conviction is a travesty of the system...if Cellini is caught in a net that was cast one person too wide, it would be a shame for him to not know how the story ends." Following Cellini's release, his lawyers filed a motion for his probationary relief and were subsequently granted the request.

William Cellini retired from the real-estate business and from active political campaigning. He resides in Illinois.
