= Raoul Whitfield =

American writer (1896–1945)

- Born: Raoul Falconer Whitfield; November 22, 1896; New York City, New York, U.S.
- Died: January 24, 1945 (aged 48); Los Angeles, California, U.S.
- Resting place: Arlington National Cemetery, Washington D.C., U.S.
- Other names: Ramon Decolta, Temple Field
- Occupation: Author
- Spouses: Prudence Ann Smith (m. 1923; div. 1933) Emily Davies Vanderbilt Thayer (m. 1933; died 1935) Lois Bell (died 1943)

Raoul Whitfield (November 22, 1896 – January 24, 1945) was an American writer of adventure, aviation, and hardboiled crime fiction. During his writing career, from the mid-1920s to the mid-1930s, Whitfield published over 300 short stories and serials in pulp magazines, as well as nine books, including Green Ice (1930) and Death in a Bowl (1931). For his novels and contributions to the Black Mask, Whitfield is considered one of the original members of the hard-boiled school of American detective fiction and has been referred as "the Black Mask's forgotten man".

By the mid-1930s, the amount of work Whitfield produced dropped substantially as he suffered what the Black Mask editor Joseph Shaw described as a "personal tragedy." Both his second and third wife died by suicide; (Note: The term suicide has been used to describe the death of Whitfield's second and third wives by various sources including Dralyuk and Ruber and Berch. News stories at the time referred to the death of Whitfield's second wife as suicide. In a letter dated November 29, 1943, Whitfield's friend, Dashiell Hammett, refers to Whitfield's third wife's death as a suicide.) in his later years, despite coming into money, Whitfield was broke and suffering from tuberculosis. He would die of the disease in 1945.

== Early life ==
Raoul F. Whitfield was born in New York City, New York on November 22, 1896. (Note: During Whitfield's life, his birth year had been reported in the range of 1896 to 1898, in part due to the possibility that Whitfield lied about his age in some publications. Ruber and Berch examined his birth certificate and reported that Whitfield was born in 1896.) He was the son of William H. Whitfield and Mabelle P. Whitfield (née Whitfield), who were cousins. His parents were also cousins of Louise Whitfield Carnegie, the wife of Andrew Carnegie. (Note: Cholly Knickerbocker is the pseudonym of Maury Henry Biddle Paul. The Cholly Knickerbocker column was originally printed in New York American and was syndicated nationally.) Whitfield used the middle name "Fauconnier" in his writing while his official birth certificate uses the Anglicized version "Falconer."

In a self-profile published in pulp magazine Argosy, Whitfield claimed to have been educated at Trinity School and Leigh University. (Note: A profile written by Whitfield himself was published in the March 1931 issue of Argosy.) From 1904 to 1912, Whitfield attended Trinity School, leaving after the eighth grade. However, the claim with regards to Leigh University has been disputed by the university's alumni association. (Note: Dralyuk cites letters from the alumni associations of both Trinity School and Leigh University to E. R. Hagemann; the former school confirmed Whitfield's attendance, while the latter claimed to have found no record of his attendance.)

In his adolescence, he accompanied his father to the Philippines, where the older Whitfield was working for the Territorial Government during the American colonial era. While in Asia, Whitfield also travelled to Japan, China, and Hawaii. (Note: Ruber and Berch claim that Whitfield moved to the Philippines before 1900, however, Dralyuk writes "that doesn't jibe with Whitfield's account; he would have been a toddler." Dralyuk is referring to the 1931 Argosy profile where Whitfield claimed: "To Guam, Manila and Japan at the age of eighteen. Several months of Hawaii on return.") These experiences would influence his writing, as Whitfield would set several of his stories in the Asia-Pacific region, most notably the two-dozen adventures of Spanish-Filipino "island detective" Jo Gar, published in the Black Mask under the pen name Ramon Decolta. In 1916, Whitfield fell ill and returned to the U.S. for treatment. After recovering, Whitfield spent some time in Hollywood working as a silent-film actor prior to the advent of the star system.

During World War I, he enlisted in the United States Army, first serving in the ambulance service and then in the air service, receiving training at Kelly Field before flying in France during the last months of the war. Whitfield received a commission as a second lieutenant (Note: Whitfield is interred in Arlington National Cemetery. His headstone (sec. 4, grave 5603) reads: "Raoul Whitfield, California. 2nd Lieut. Air Service.") and returned to the U.S. in February 1919. He would later draw on his war experience in writing adventure and aviation tales, including the juveniles Silver Wings (1930) and Danger Zone (1931), which were marketed as based on the author's own experiences in their dust jackets.

After the armistice, Whitfield worked in a steel mill in Pittsburgh, Pennsylvania according to the wishes of his family that he learn the steel business. That did not last long and he soon tried other jobs including working as a bonds salesman, and then as a reporter for the Pittsburgh Post. At the time, Whitfield was living in East McKeesport, part of Greater Pittsburgh. He would later use Pittsburgh as the setting for his first novel, Green Ice (1930), where the fictional Post-Dispatch newspaper figures prominently.

== Career ==
Whitfield began submitting short stories to pulp magazines while working as a reporter at the Pittsburgh Post. His first piece of published short fiction was the airplane racing story "Flashing Towers" in a March 1924 issue of Street & Smith's Sport Story Magazine. (Note: Dralyuk cites "Flashing Towers" as Whitfield's first piece of published fiction, predating the May 1924 story "The Sky Climbers," which Ruber and Berch claimed to be Whitfield's first piece of published fiction.) He was soon publishing stories in pulp magazines such as Sport Story, War Stories, Breezy Stories, Droll Stories, Triple-X Magazine, Air Trails, Boys' Life, Youth's Companion, Telling Tails, and Everybody's Magazine. His output was so prolific that Whitfield began to adopt the pen name Temple Field, which was used alongside his own byline in Fawcett's Battle Stories, as well as the pen name Ramon Decolta, used for his Jo Gar stories in the Black Mask. Whitfield's use of pen names grew from the editorial policy of pulp magazines not to feature more than one story under the same byline in a single issue. Charles F. Danver, a writer at the Pittsburgh Post, said of Whitfield's time at the paper: "Raoul Whitfield, a reporter on the old Post, used to write stories and hang them on hooks on the wall. When he needed money, he'd grab a piece here and a piece there, paste them together, and mail the result to one of the numerous pulp magazines to which he contributed."

=== Black Mask and novels ===
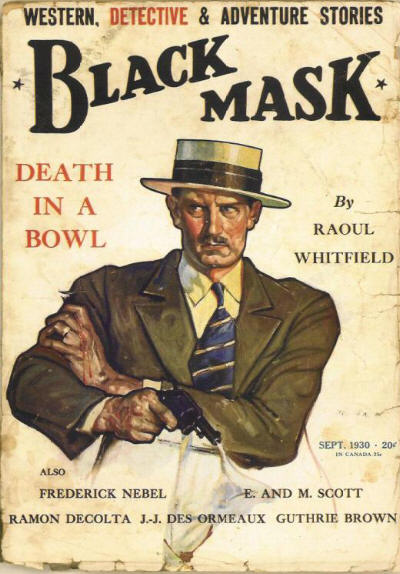
September 1930 issue of Black Mask magazine, featuring Raoul Whitfield

In 1926, Whitfield broke into Black Mask with an aviation story, featuring pilot Bill Scott ("Scotty"), published in their March issue. At the time, the Black Mask was edited by Philip C. Cody, who was replaced with Joseph Shaw later that year. From 1926 to his final Black Mask story in 1934, Whitfield would contribute ninety stories to the pulp magazine, the second most after Erle Stanley Gardner in less than half the span of time. The same year he first published in Black Mask, Whitfield quit his job at the Pittsburgh Post, moving to Florida with his wife Prudence in order to focus on being a full-time writer. Shaw would write that when Whitfield began to be published in the pulp, the writer was "on his way to Florida to hole away from interruption and settle down to the serious business of making a first-rate newspaperman into a better writer." As Whitfield published in the Black Mask, Shaw would "nurture and develop" Whitfield's writing. By February 1930, a poll announced Whitfield a favorite amongst the Black Mask readers, alongside Caroll John Daly, Frederick Nebel, Dashiell Hammett, and Gardner.

During his tenure with the Black Mask, Whitfield befriended Hammett, with the pair being referred to as "Whit and Dash" by Shaw. While their friendship initially began through written correspondence, they were finally able to meet in 1928 after Whitfield's move to Southern California, closer to Hammett's residence in San Francisco. By 1930, both men had moved to New York and became drinking buddies. It was Hammett who recommended Whitfield's writings to Blanch Knopf, his editor at Alfred A. Knopf. This led to the publication of Whitfield's debut novel Green Ice (1930), the title referring to emeralds that feature prominently in the novel. Set in Pittsburgh, the novel features Whitfield's Mal Ourney, an ex-convict recently released from Sing Sing. The novel patched together the "Crime Breeders" serial originally published in the Black Mask from December 1929 to April 1930. In his "Crime Wave" column for the New York Evening Post, Hammett praised his friend's novel, writing, "The plot doesn't matter. What matters is that here are 280 pages of naked action pounded into tough compactness by staccato, hammer-like writing". The novel was also favorably reviewed by Will Cuppy of the New York Herald Tribune, who called it "by several miles the slickest detective job of the season" in a year that saw Hammett's own The Maltese Falcon (1930) released. After Green Ice was translated into French by Marcel Duhamel, it "led the way" for new American genre of noir fiction in France.

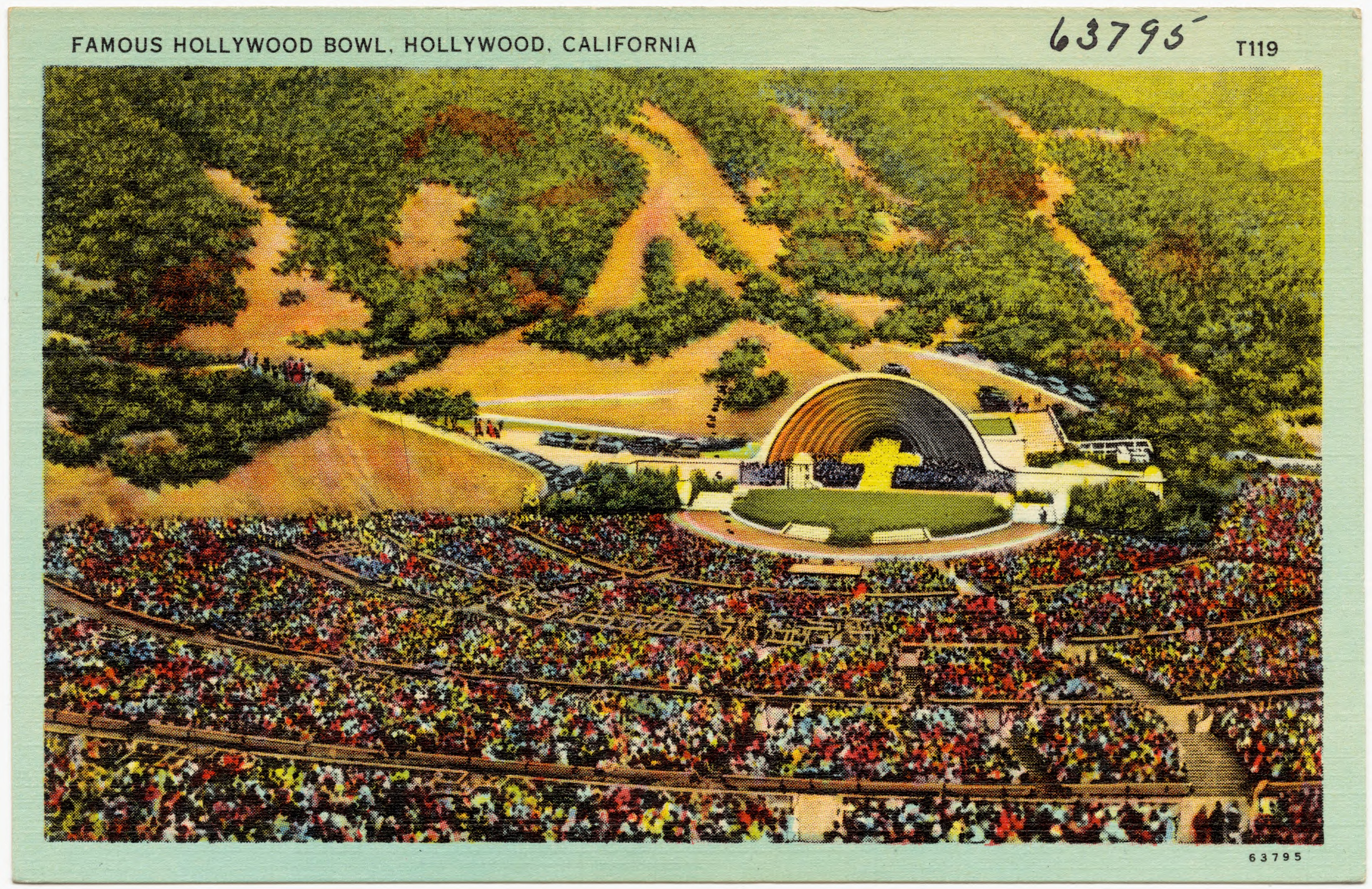
The Hollywood Bowl is the setting of Whitfield's crime fiction serial and novel Death in a Bowl (1931) featuring detective Ben Jardinn.

Knopf would go on to publish Whitfield's Death in a Bowl (1931), based on a Ben Jardinn serial published in the Black Mask, "the very first hardboiled Hollywood detective." This was followed by The Virgin Kills (1932), an original novel. Along with his crime fiction novels, Knopf would publish several juveniles written by Whitfield: Silver Wings (1930), Danger Zone (1931), and Danger Circus (1933). Another juvenile, Wingers of Gold (1930), was published earlier by Penn Publishing Company. At the same time Knopf was publishing his work, Whitfield brought some of his material to their rival, Farrar & Rinehart. Farrar would published Whitfield's Five (1931) and Killers' Carnival (1932) under the pen name Temple Field, which he had used before in Fawcett's Battle Stories, despite the fact that both novels patched together serials published under Whitfield's own name in the Black Mask.

==== As Ramon Decolta ====
With the story "West of Guam" published in the February 1930 issue of the Black Mask, Whitfield introduced the character of Spanish-Filipino "island detective" Jo Gar, short for Jose Garcia, under the pen name Ramon Decolta. The pen name allowed Whitfield to publish several stories in a single issue of the Black Mask, so long as they were under distinct bylines. It has also been suggested that "he chose a Spanish name to lend a dash of authenticity to the tales."

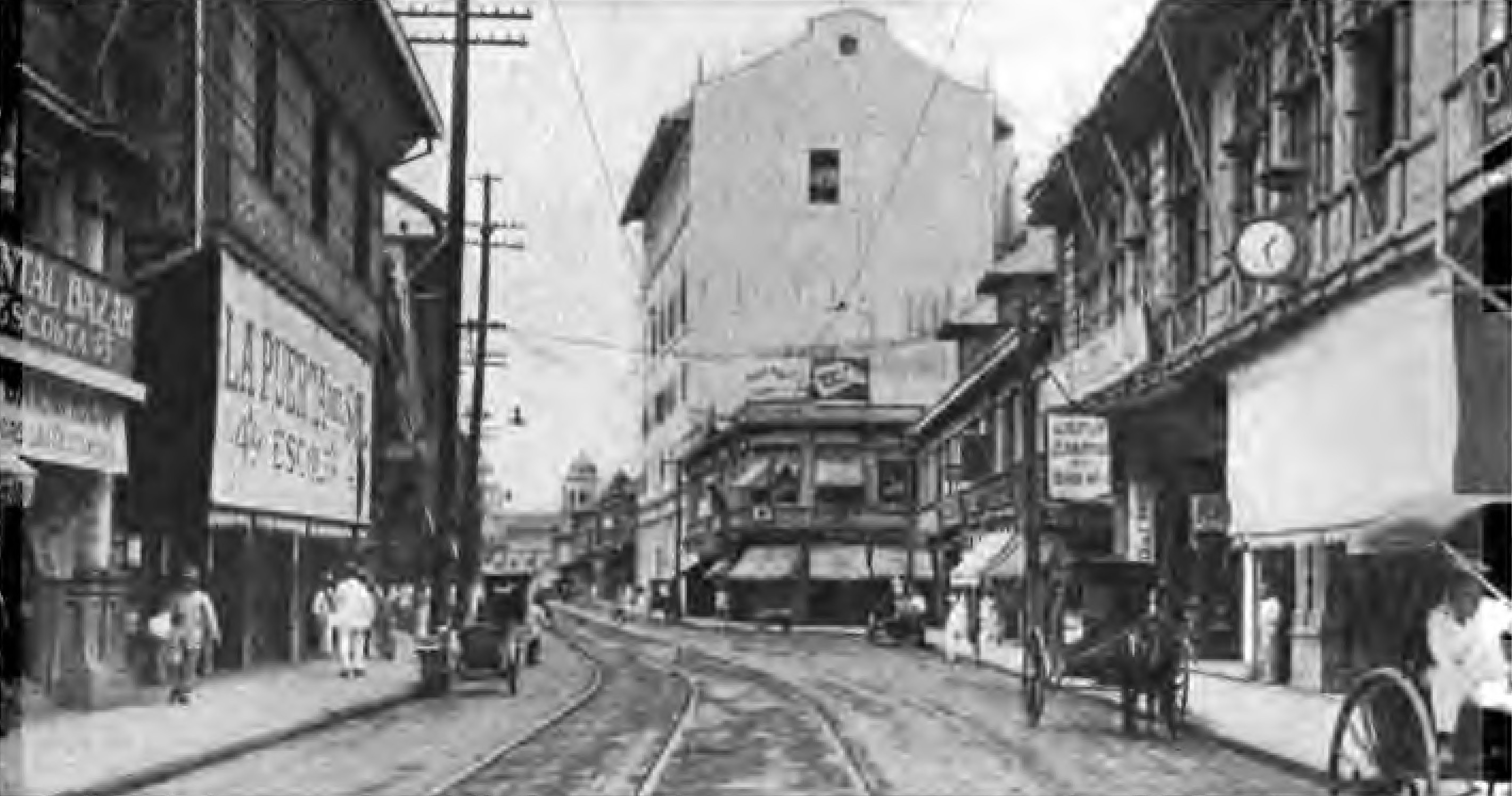
Escolta Street in Manila during the American colonial period, where Jo Gar has his office.

The stories were influenced by the writer's own experiences in the Asia-Pacific region growing up. Although primarily set in Manila, some of Jo Gar's adventures took him to Baguio, Nagasaki, and San Francisco. The backdrop of the Jo Gar adventures was the American colonial era of Philippine history. In A Companion to Crime Fiction, Ed Christian writes: "These stories convey a great deal of respect for their tight-lipped, hard-boiled Filipino detective protagonist, Gar, whose understanding of indigenous, hybridized, and colonial cultural norms and the ins and outs of life in Manilla are usually crucial to solving his cases."

From February 1930 through to July 1933, Whitfield would write twenty-four Jo Gar stories for the Black Mask as Ramon Decolta. After taking a hiatus from writing, he produced two more Jo Gar stories, this time published under his own name, in Hearst's International-Cosmopolitan. This included Whitfield's last published work, the Jo Gar story "The Great Black" in their August 1937 issue. After Whitfield's death, six Jo Gar stories would be reprinted in Ellery Queen's Mystery Magazine over the course of their 1949 issues, under the name Raoul Whitfield.

=== Hollywood year ===
In the June 1932 issue of the Black Mask, Shaw wrote: "As this number goes to print, Raoul Whitfield has hied himself hence to Hollywood on a long period contract with Paramount on terms that will take all the press out of the Depression." It had been rumored that his Hollywood-based novel Death in a Bowl (1931) had been optioned. As his editor announced, Whitfield signed a term contract with Paramount in March. On August 11, 1932, it was reported in the Hollywood Reporter that Whitfield was writing the screenplay for a Metro-Goldwyn-Mayer film based on the Sax Rohmer novel The Mask of Fu Manchu (1932). When the film was released, however, the only writers credited were Irene Kuhn, Edgar Allan Woolf, and John Willard.

In late 1932, Whitfield's Donald Free detective story "Man Killer," published in the April 1932 issue of the Black Mask, was bought by Warner Brothers. It began shooting in early 1933 with an adapted screenplay by Rian James, director Michael Curtiz, and William Powell starring as the detective Donald Free. When the film Private Detective 62 (1933) was released, it gave Whitfield a "story by" credit. In the April 22, 1933 edition of The Hollywood Reporter, Whitfield took out an advertisement that read:

MAY I congratulate those gentlemen of Warner Brothers who, when I finished the shooting script from my original story "THE PRIVATE DETECTIVE," must have worked so hard over it to effect so many changes?

And may I congratulate, somewhat belatedly, my good friend, Rene, perhaps the finest chef in all of Paris?

I have always considered unfortunate my distaste for tripe.

Private Detective 62 would have his only official Hollywood credit in his lifetime. Justin Gautreau argues that the B-film crime drama Moonlight Murders (1936) is an adaptation of the novel Death in a Bowl (1931). The Metro-Goldwyn-Mayer film, however, does not include Whitfield's name anywhere; it credits "the original story" to Albert J. Cohen and Robert T. Shannon, with a screenplay by Edgar Allan Woolf and Florence Ryerson.

Even before Private Detective 62 was released, Whitfield claimed to be turning to playwriting. In January 1933, he adapted his short story "Mistral" into a three-act play with his soon-to-be second wife, Emily Davies Vanderbilt Thayer. In February 1934, Whitfield published his final Black Mask story, "Death of Fifth Avenue." Other than a couple of Jo Gar stories published in 1935 and 1937 in the Cosmopolitan, Whitfield does not seem to have published any other pieces before his death in 1945.

== Personal life ==
=== Marriages ===
Whitfield was married three times.

==== Prudence Vantine Smith ====
His first marriage was with Prudence Vantine (Note: Her name has also been spelled Van Tine in some contemporary publications.) Smith (1895–1990) on April 28, 1923, in Pittsburgh, Pennsylvania; they met while he was still working at the Pittsburgh Post. Sometime in 1926, they moved to Florida, living at Pasadena on the Gulf, St. Petersburg. They then moved to Southern California in 1928, and by 1930 were in New York, on the way to an extended stay in Europe. By 1932, Whitfield and Prudence were separated, and a divorce was granted in 1933. In the marriage license Whitfield obtained for his second marriage, he stated that he had previously been married and that the union ended in divorce in Mexico. In 1939, a judgment in New Mexico granted Prudence alimony from Whitfield for the period of June 5, 1933 to March 5, 1939.

A publication of selected letters penned by Whitfield's friend Dashiell Hammett revealed a correspondence with Prudence after her divorce from Whitfield; she has been referred as a paramour and lover of Hammett. Prudence died on August 19, 1990.

==== Emily Davies Vanderbilt Thayer ====
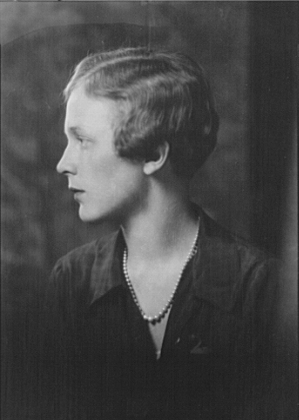
Emily Davies Vanderbilt Thayer, Whitfield's second wife, photographed in 1925 by Arnold Genthe. At the time the photograph was taken, Emily was still married to her first husband, William Henry Vanderbilt III.

During his separation from Prudence, Whitfield met his second wife, New York socialite Emily O'Neill (née Davies) Vanderbilt Thayer (1903–1935).

Emily was the daughter of Fredrick Martin Davies and Emily O'Neill Davies, and the granddaughter of Eugene M. O'Neill (1850–1926), former editor and owner of the Pittsburgh Dispatch. This was her third marriage. She was previously married to childhood friend William Henry Vanderbilt III (1901–1981), son of Alfred Gwynne Vanderbilt, with whom she had one daughter, Emily Vanderbilt. Their marriage lasted from 1923 to 1928, concluding on her second attempt at bringing a suit of divorce on the ground of neglect to provide. Her first attempt was in a court in Paris the summer before, but it was reported that they then reconciled. On December 7, 1928, soon after receiving a final decree of divorce from Vanderbilt, she married theatrical producer and aviator Sigourney Thayer (1896–1944). A year later, this marriage also ended in divorce. Around the late 1920s, Emily spent time in Paris, where she became acquainted with F. Scott Fitzgerald, Thomas Wolfe, and E. E. Cummings. According to Fitzgerald, Emily served as the inspiration for Amy Carlton in Wolfe's novel You Can't Go Home Again (1940). (Note: In a letter to his daughter dated December 1940, Fitzgerald writes: "The picture of Amy Carlton (Emily Davies Vanderbilt who used to come to our apartment in Paris–do you remember?), with the cracked grey eyes and the exactly reproduced speech, is simply just perfect.")

Prior to their marriage, during a season spent in Cannes, France, the couple adapted Whitfield's European detective story "Mistral," published in the December 15, 1931 issue of Adventure, into a three-act play. It was submitted for copyright under both of their names on January 11, 1933. On July 19, 1933, they married in a ceremony that was considered a "surprise to their friends."

When obtaining a marriage license, Whitfield resided in Sutton Place in Manhattan, New York. After their marriage, the couple bought the Dead Horse Ranch near Las Vegas, New Mexico and settled there. Whitfield's novel Danger Circus (1933) is dedicated to "Emily Vanderbilt." In 1934, they attempted to produce their "Mistral" play adaptation on Broadway, but nothing came of it.

On February 21, 1935, Emily filed a suit for divorce against Whitfield in the San Miguel Country Court, alleging cruel and inhuman conduct, physical violence and violent and improper language. On May, 24, Emily was found dead by a self-inflicted bullet wound in their bedroom at Dead Horse Ranch. It was claimed that she had become despondent over the pending divorce and her desire to see her daughter, who was living with Vanderbilt in Cannes. At the time of her death, the couple were estranged, and Whitfield was in Hollywood. Based on a will drawn up three months after their marriage, Whitfield was her sole heir.

==== Lois Bell ====
Whitfield's third wife, Lois Bell (1915–1943), was a local barmaid, almost twenty years his junior, who he had been seeing before his second wife's death. They were living on Dead Horse Ranch for some part of their marriage in the late 1930s. By 1942, however, "Lois was no longer in the picture."

In an August letter to Lillian Hellman, Hammett relates that Whitfield's first wife, Prudence, kept him informed of Whitfield's life, writing: "Pru Whitfield wrote me that Raoul is dying of T.B. in a San Fernando hospital and that Lois, his third wife, 'fell' (the quotes are Pru's) out of a window in San Francisco recently and is pretty badly banged up." (Note: Dralyuk quotes from Hammett's letter to Hellman dated August 29, 1943.) Hammett's subsequent letters reveal that Lois died from her injuries on September 27, 1943. (Note: Dralyuk cites Hammett's letters to Lilliam Hellman dated August 29, October 27, and November 25, 1943.) In a letter dated November 25, 1943, Hammett refers to the death of Lois as "death by suicide."

=== Death ===
Although Whitfield was fairly wealthy after the death of his second wife, he spent the money quickly. By 1942, Whitfield was a resident of the Veterans Hospital in San Fernando Valley, Los Angeles, dealing with tuberculosis. Upon hearing of his situation, Dashiell Hammett sent a check for $500 to cover Whitfield's medical expenses. (Note: Dralyuk cites Hammett's letter to Hellmann dated February 22, 1944, where Hammett describes Whitfield as "broke.")

Whitfield died from tuberculosis in Los Angeles, California on January 24, 1945. He is buried at Arlington National Cemetery.

== Legacy ==
Soon after Whitfield's death, Black Mask editor Joseph Shaw compiled, edited, and published The Hard-Boiled Omnibus: Early Stories from the Black Mask (1946). In the collection, Shaw recognized Whitfield's work as a pioneer of the hard-boiled school along with Dashiell Hammett, Raymond Chandler, Paul Cain, and Lester Dent, among others. Whitfield is the only author to have several of his works included in the collection: the short story "Inside Job," originally published in February 1932, and the Jo Gar story "Death in Pasig," originally published in March 1930. Soon after its publication, "Inside Job" was bought by millionaire film producer Jack Wrather. The adaptation was released as High Tide (1947), starring Don Castle, directed by John Reinhardt, with an adapted screenplay by Robert Presnell Sr. The film would give Whitfield his second Hollywood credit, with a "story by" recognition, albeit posthumously.

Despite his prolific writing during his career, Whitfield has been referred to as biographically and critically neglected, leading to the nickname "the Black Mask's forgotten man." Boris Dralyuk writes: "It is now customary to weigh the lesser known Black Mask boys against the two who made it, Dashiell Hammett and Raymond Chandler [...] and it has hurt no one as consistently as it has Raoul Whitfield."

Whitfield's first novel, Green Ice (1930), was recognized by Jean-Paul Schweighaeuser as "leading the way" for noir fiction in France. It was the first novel Marcel Duhamel would translate for Gallimard; Duhamel would later start the French publishing imprint Série noire in 1945, focusing on crime fiction of the hardboiled genre. Whitfield's second novel, Death in a Bowl (1931) is considered by Mike Davis to be "the very first hardboiled Hollywood detective." A similar assessment of the novel is made by David Fine, who writes: "Among the Black Mask writers, Raoul Whitfield, Caroll John Daly, Dashiell Hammett, and Paul Cain set the tone for the Southern California brand of hard-boiled fiction. Whitfield's novel Death in a Bowl (1931), serialized in Black Mask in 1930s, is probably the first of the hard-boiled Los Angeles private eye novels."

In 1980, E.R. Hagemann singles out the Jo Gar stories as "worthy of a revival." Similarly, in 2002, Peter Ruber and Victor Berch remark that "only Jo Gar is worthy of standing alongside other great detectives," while Dralyuk considers him "the most discerning of Whitfield's creations." Otto Penzler found that Whitfield "made a significant breakthrough in the way Asians were portrayed in pulp fiction," particularly in contrast with the villainous Fu Manchu of Sax Rohmer and the minor role of Charlie Chan in his early novels by Earl Derr Biggers. Penzler would include the six-connected stories of the "Rainbow Diamonds" serial, originally published from February to August 1931, in The Black Lizard Big Book of Black Mask Stories (2010). Eighteen of the Jo Gar cases were collected and published as Jo Gar's Casebook (2002) before all twenty-four stories were compiled in West of Guam: The Complete Cases of Jo Gar (2013).

== Selected list of works ==
=== Novels ===
- Green Ice. New York, NY: Alfred A. Knopf. 1930. (Note: Novelization of the five-part Mal Ourney "Crime Breeders" serial that ran in the Black Mask from December 1929 to April 1930.)
- Death in a Bowl. New York, NY: Alfred A. Knopf. 1931. (Note: Novelization of the three-part Ben Jardinn "Death in a Bowl" serial published in Black Mask from September to November 1930.)
- The Virgin Kills. New York, NY: Alfred A. Knopf, 1932.

as Temple Field

- Five. New York, NY: Farrar & Rinehart. 1931. (Note: Novelization of the Gary Greer serial published in Black Mask under Whitfield's own name from February to October 1929.)
- Killer's Carnival. NY: Farrar & Finehart. 1932. (Note: Novelization of the Alan Van Cleve serial published in Black Mask under Whitfield's own name from August 1931 to January 1932.)

==== Children's novels ====
- Wings of Gold. Philadelphia, PA: Penn Publishing Company. 1930.
- Silver Wings. New York, NY: Alfred A. Knopf. 1930. (Note: All stories except for "Sky Flames" originally published in Boy's Life Magazine)
- Danger Zone. New York, NY: Alfred A. Knopf. 1931.
- Danger Circus. New York, NY: Alfred A. Knopf. 1933.

=== Short stories with serialized characters ===
Alan Van Cleve

- "The Sky Club Affair". Black Mask. August 1931.
- "Red Terrace". Black Mask. September 1931.
- "Steel Arena". Black Mask. October 1931.
- "Van Cleve Calling". Black Mask. November 1931.
- "Unfair Exchange". Black Mask. December 1931.
- "Skyline Death". Black Mask. January 1932.

The Alan Van Cleve stories were published as the novel Killer's Carnival (1932) under the name Temple Field.

==== Ben Jardinn ====
- "Death in a Bowl (Part One)". Black Mask. September 1930.
- "Death in a Bowl (Part Two)". Black Mask. October 1930.
- "Death in a Bowl (Part Three)". Black Mask. November 1930.
- "Murder by Request". Black Mask. January 1933.
- "Dark Death". Black Mask. August 1933.

The "Death in a Bowl" series of Ben Jardinn was published as the novel Death in a Bowl (1931).

==== Bill Scott ====
- "Scotty Troubles Trouble". Black Mask. March 1926.
- "Scotty Scouts Around". Black Mask. April 1926.

==== Chuck Reddington ====
- "Ten Hours". Black Mask. December 1926.
- "White Murder". Black Mask. February 1927.
- "Sky-High Odds". Black Mask. March 1927.
- "South of Savannah". Black Mask. May 1927.
- "Bottled Death". Black Mask. June 1927.
- "Live Men's Gold". Black Mask. August 1927.
- "The Sky's the Limit". Black Mask. January 1928.

==== Dion Davies ====
- "A Woman Can Kill". Black Mask. September 1933.
- "Money Talk". Black Mask. October 1933.

==== Donald Free ====
- "Man Killer". Black Mask. April 1932.
- "Walking Dynamite". Black Mask. May 1932.
- "Blue Murder". Black Mask. September 1932.

Garry Greer

- "On the Spot". Black Mask. February 1929.
- "Out of the Sky". Black Mask. March 1929.
- "The Pay-Off". Black Mask. April 1929.
- "High Odds". Black Mask. May 1929.
- "The Carnival Kill". Black Mask. July 1929.
- "The River Street Death". Black Mask. August 1929.
- "The Squeeze". Black Mask. September 1929.
- "Sal the Dude". Black Mask. October 1929.

The Gary Greer stories were collectively known as the "Laughing Death" serial when published in the Black Mask, and were published as the novel Five (1931) under the name Temple Field.

==== Jo Gar (as Ramon Decolta) ====
- "West of Guam". Black Mask. February 1930.
- "Death in Pasig". Black Mask, March 1930.
- "Red Hemp". Black Mask. April 1930.
- "Signals of Storm". Black Mask. June 1930.
- "Enough Rope". Black Mask. July 1930.
- "Nagasaki Bound". Black Mask. September 1930.
- "Nagasaki Knives". Black Mask. October 1930.
- "The Caleso Murders". Black Mask. December 1930.
- "Silence House". Black Mask. January 1931.
- "Diamonds of Dread". Black Mask. February 1931.
- "The Man in White". Black Mask. March 1931.
- "The Blind Chinese". Black Mask. April 1931.
- "Red Dawn". Black Mask. May 1931.
- "Blue Glass". Black Mask. July 1931.
- "Diamonds of Death". Black Mask. August 1931.
- "Shooting Gallery". Black Mask. October 1931.
- "The Javanese Mask". Black Mask. December 1931.
- "The Black Sampan". Black Mask. June 1932.
- "China Man". Black Mask. March 1932.
- "The Siamese Cat". Black Mask. April 1932.
- "Climbing Death". Black Mask. July 1932.
- "The Magician Murder". Black Mask. November 1932.
- "The Man from Shanghai". Black Mask. May 1933.
- "The Amber Fan". Black Mask. July 1933.
- "The Mystery of the Fan-Backed Chair". Hearst's International-Cosmopolitan. February 1935.
- "The Great Black". Hearst's International-Cosmopolitan. August 1937.

==== MacLeod ====
- "First Blood". Black Mask. June 1928.
- "Blue Murder". Black Mask. July 1928.
- "High Death". Black Mask. August 1928.
- "Red Wings". Black Mask. September 1928.
- "Ghost Guns". Black Mask. October 1928.
- "The Sky Trap". Black Mask. November 1928.

The MacLeod stories were collectively known as the "Border Brand" serial when published in the Black Mask.

==== Mal Ourney ====
- "Outside". Black Mask. December 1929.
- "Red Smoke". Black Mask. January 1930.
- "Green Ice". Black Mask. February 1930.
- "Oval Face". Black Mask. March 1930.
- "Killers' Show". Black Mask. April 1930.

The Mal Ourney stories were collectively known as the "Crime Breeders" serial when published in the Black Mask, and were published as the novel Green Ice (1930).

=== Other short stories ===
- "Jenny Meets the Boys". Black Mask. June 1926.
- "Black Air". Black Mask. July 1926.
- "Roaring Death". Black Mask. August 1926.
- "Flying Gold". Black Mask. September 1926.
- "Delivered Goods". Black Mask. November 1926.
- "Uneasy Money". Black Mask. January 1927.
- "Sixty Minutes". Black Mask. October 1927.
- "Red Pearls". Black Mask. November 1927.
- "Soft Goods". Black Mask. February 1928.
- "Little Guns". Black Mask. April 1928.
- "Black Murder". Black Mask. May 1928.
- "Murder by Mistake". Black Mask. August 1930.
- "Murder in the Ring". Black Mask. December 1930.
- "About Kid Deth". Black Mask. February 1931.
- "Face Powder". Black Mask. April 1931.
- "Soft City". Black Mask. May 1931.
- "For Sale–Murder". Black Mask. June 1931.
- "Inside Job". Black Mask. February 1932.
- "Dead Men Tell Tales". Black Mask, November 1932.
- "Not Tomorrow". Black Mask. November 1933.
- "Murder Again". Black Mask. December 1933.
- "High Murder". Black Mask. January 1934.
- "Death on Fifth Avenue". Black Mask. February 1934.

=== Film adaptations ===
- Private Detective 62. Based on the short story "Man Killer" (1932) by Raoul Whitfield. Warner Bros. Pictures, Inc. 1933.
- High Tide. Based on the short story "Inside Job" (1932) by Raoul Whitfield. Wrather Productions, Inc. 1947.
