= Pulp magazine =

Fiction magazines made from 1896 to the 1950s

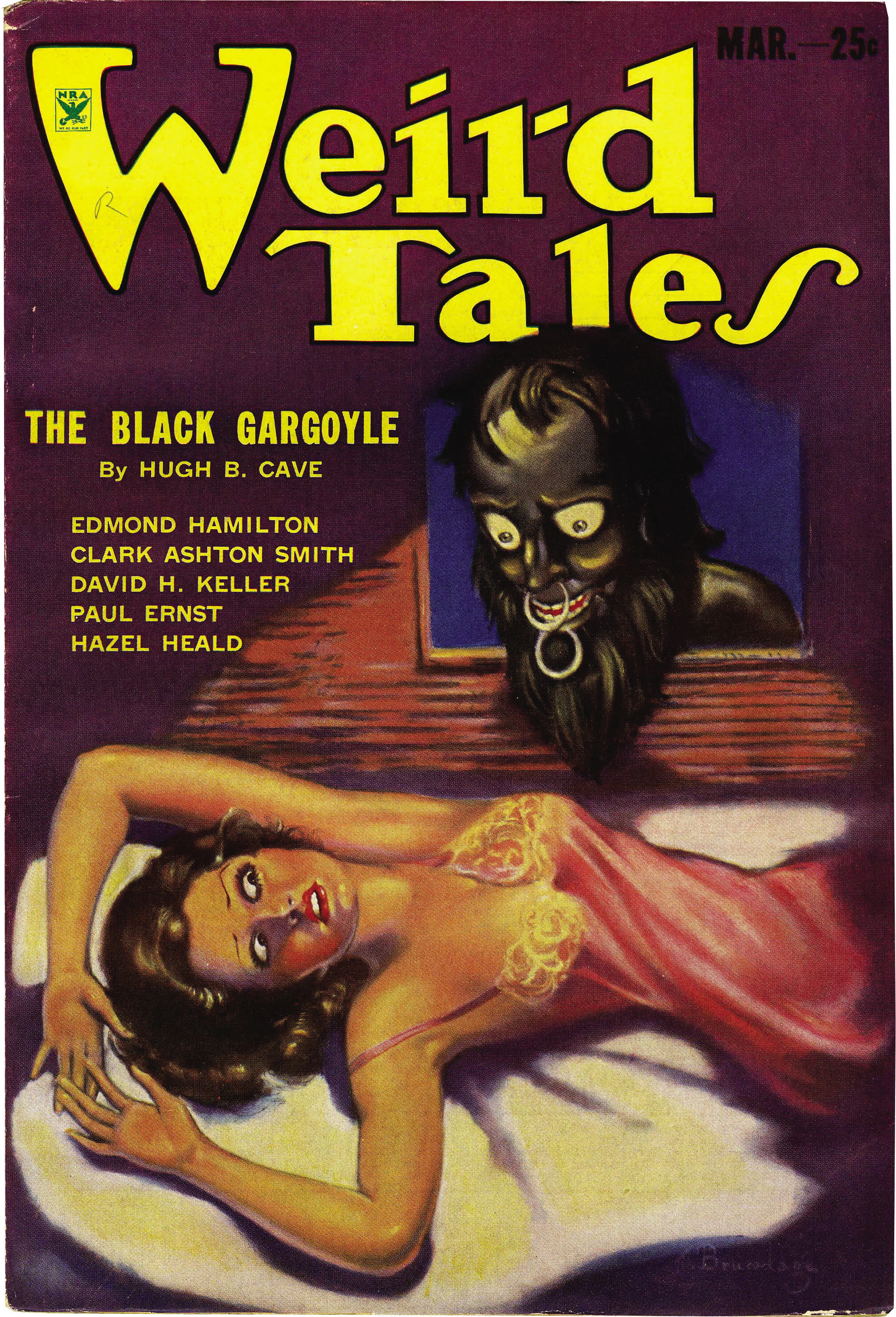
March 1934 issue of Weird Tales, illustrated by Margaret Brundage.

Pulp magazines, also called "the pulps", were inexpensive fiction magazines that originated in the United States in 1896 and were published until around 1955. They became particularly popular during the Great Depression, offering readers inexpensive escapist entertainment. The word pulp derives from the cheap wood pulp paper on which the magazines were printed. In contrast, magazines printed on higher-quality paper were called "glossies" or "slicks". The typical pulp magazine was 128 pages long, 7 by 10 in (18 by 25 cm), and 0.5 in (1.3 cm) thick, with ragged, untrimmed edges. Pulps were the successors to the penny dreadfuls, dime novels, and some of the short-fiction magazines of the 19th century.

Although many respected writers contributed to pulp magazines, the publications became particularly associated with lurid and sensational stories and cover illustrations. Pulps encompassed a wide range of genres, including adventure, westerns, detective fiction, science fiction, fantasy, horror, mystery, and romance. They played an important role in the development of several subgenres, particularly space opera, hardboiled detective fiction, Lovecraftian horror, and sword and sorcery, while also contributing to the popularization of broader genres such as crime fiction and Western fiction. Digest magazines and men's adventure magazines subsequently emerged as distinct publishing formats and have sometimes been mistakenly classified as pulps.

Modern superhero fiction is sometimes regarded as a descendant of the "hero pulps", magazines devoted to the adventures of recurring heroic characters. Prominent examples included The Shadow, Doc Savage, The Phantom Detective, Captain Future, and Hopalong Cassidy. Other influential pulp-fiction heroes, such as Zorro, Tarzan, and Conan the Barbarian, appeared primarily in anthology magazines rather than character-specific hero pulps.

The pulps gave rise to the term pulp fiction, which originally referred to fiction published in pulp magazines and acquired a pejorative connotation of formulaic or low-quality literature. The term also came to describe a broader category of popular fiction resembling the stories published in pulp magazines, particularly works characterized by sensational plots, fast-paced action, and themes of crime, adventure, and mystery, regardless of publication format. Successors to pulp magazines included paperback books, particularly those featuring hardboiled detective stories and erotic fiction.

== History ==
=== Origins ===
Before pulp magazines, Newgate novels (1840s-1860s) fictionalized the exploits of real-life criminals. Later, British sensation novels gained peak popularity in the 1860s-1870s. Sensation novels focused on shocking stories that reflected modern-day anxieties, and were the direct precursors of pulp fiction.

The first "pulp" was Frank Munsey's revamped Argosy magazine of 1896, with about 135,000 words (192 pages) per issue, on pulp paper with untrimmed edges, and no illustrations, even on the cover. The steam-powered printing press had been in widespread use for some time, enabling the boom in dime novels; prior to Munsey, however, no one had combined cheap printing, cheap paper and cheap authors in a package that provided affordable entertainment to young working-class people. In six years, Argosy went from a few thousand copies per month to over half a million.

Street & Smith, a dime novel and boys' weekly publisher, was next on the market. Seeing Argosy's success, they launched The Popular Magazine in 1903, which they billed as the "biggest magazine in the world" by virtue of its being two pages (the interior sides of the front and back cover) longer than Argosy. Due to differences in page layout however, the magazine had substantially less text than Argosy. The Popular Magazine did introduce color covers to pulp publishing, and the magazine began to take off when in 1905 the publishers acquired the rights to serialize Ayesha (1905), by H. Rider Haggard, a sequel to his popular novel She (1887). Haggard's Lost World genre influenced several key pulp writers, including Edgar Rice Burroughs, Robert E. Howard, Talbot Mundy and Abraham Merritt. In 1907, the cover price rose to 15 cents and 30 pages were added to each issue; along with establishing a stable of authors for each magazine, this change proved successful and circulation began to approach that of Argosy. Street and Smith's next innovation was the introduction of specialized genre pulps, with each magazine focusing on a particular genre, such as detective stories, romance, etc.

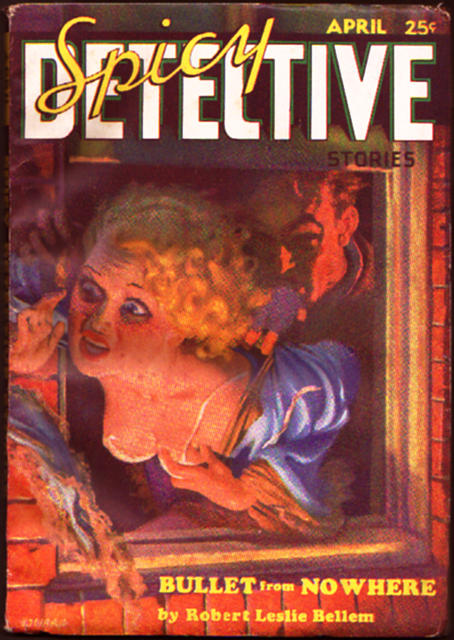
Cover of the pulp magazine Spicy Detective Stories vol. 2, #6 (April 1935) featuring "Bullet from Nowhere" by Robert Leslie Bellem

=== Peak of popularity ===
At their peak of popularity from the 1920s until the 1940s, the most successful pulps sold up to one million copies per issue. In 1934, Frank Gruber said there were some 150 pulp titles. The most successful pulp magazines were Argosy, Adventure, Blue Book and Short Stories, collectively described by some pulp historians as "The Big Four". Among the best-known other titles of this period were Amazing Stories, Black Mask, Dime Detective, Flying Aces, Horror Stories, Love Story Magazine, Marvel Tales, Oriental Stories, Planet Stories, Spicy Detective, Startling Stories, Thrilling Wonder Stories, Unknown, Weird Tales and Western Story Magazine.

During the economic hardships of the Great Depression, pulps provided affordable content to the masses, and were one of the primary forms of entertainment, along with film and radio.

Although pulp magazines were primarily an American phenomenon, there were also a number of British pulp magazines published between the Edwardian era and World War II. Notable UK pulps included The Pall Mall Magazine, The Novel Magazine, Cassell's Magazine, The Story-Teller, The Sovereign Magazine, Hutchinson's Adventure-Story and Hutchinson's Mystery-Story. The German fantasy magazine Der Orchideengarten had a similar format to American pulp magazines, in that it was printed on rough pulp paper and heavily illustrated.

=== World War II and market decline ===
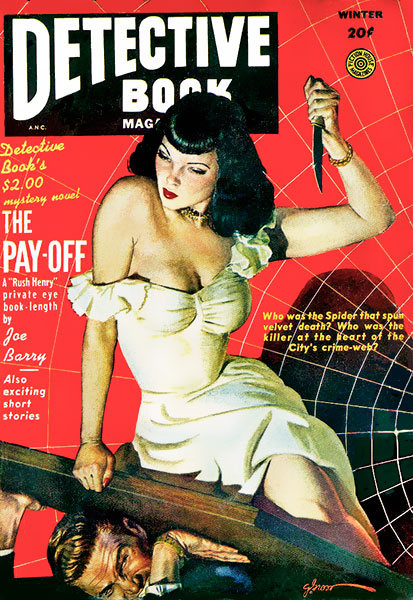
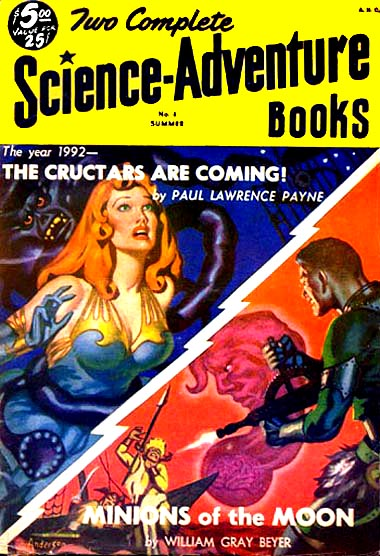
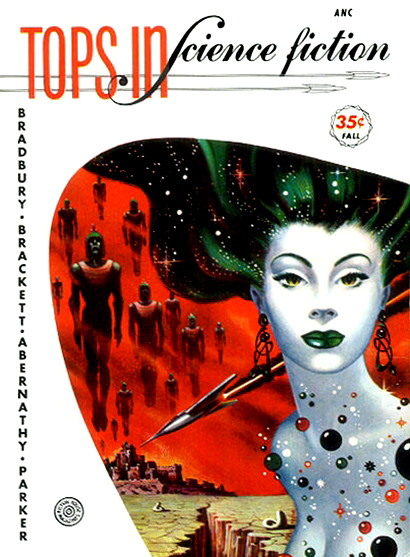
Pulp magazines began to decline during the 1940s, giving way to paperbacks, comics and digest-sized novels

During the Second World War, paper shortages had a serious impact on pulp production, starting a steady rise in costs and the decline of the pulps. Following the model of Ellery Queen's Mystery Magazine in 1941, some magazines began to switch to digest size: smaller, sometimes thicker magazines. In 1949, Street & Smith closed most of their pulp magazines in order to move upmarket and produce slicks.

Competition from comic-books and paperback novels further eroded the pulps' market share, but it has been suggested the widespread expansion of television also drew away the readership of the pulps. In the more affluent United States of the post-war era, the price gap compared to slick magazines was far less significant. In the 1950s, men's adventure magazines also began to draw some former pulp readers.

The 1957 liquidation of the American News Company, then the primary distributor of pulp magazines, has sometimes been taken as marking the end of the "pulp era"; by that date, many of the famous pulps of the previous generation, including Black Mask, The Shadow, Doc Savage, and Weird Tales, were defunct (though some of those titles have been revived in various formats in the decades since). Almost all of the few remaining former pulp magazines are science fiction or mystery magazines, now in formats similar to "digest size", such as Analog Science Fiction and Fact, though published on good-quality paper. The old format is still in use for some lengthy serials, like the German science fiction weekly Perry Rhodan (over 3,000 issues as of 2019).

Over the course of their evolution, there were a huge number of pulp magazine titles; Harry Steeger of Popular Publications claimed that his company alone had published over 300, and at their peak they were publishing 42 titles per month. Many titles of course survived only briefly. While the most popular titles were monthly, many were bimonthly and some were quarterly.

The collapse of the pulp industry changed the landscape of publishing because pulps were the single largest sales outlet for short stories. Combined with the decrease in slick magazine fiction markets, writers trying to support themselves by creating fiction switched to novels and book-length anthologies of shorter pieces. Some ex-pulp writers like Hugh B. Cave and Robert Leslie Bellem had moved on to writing for television by the 1950s.

The last pulp to cease publication was Ranch Romances in 1971.

== Genres ==
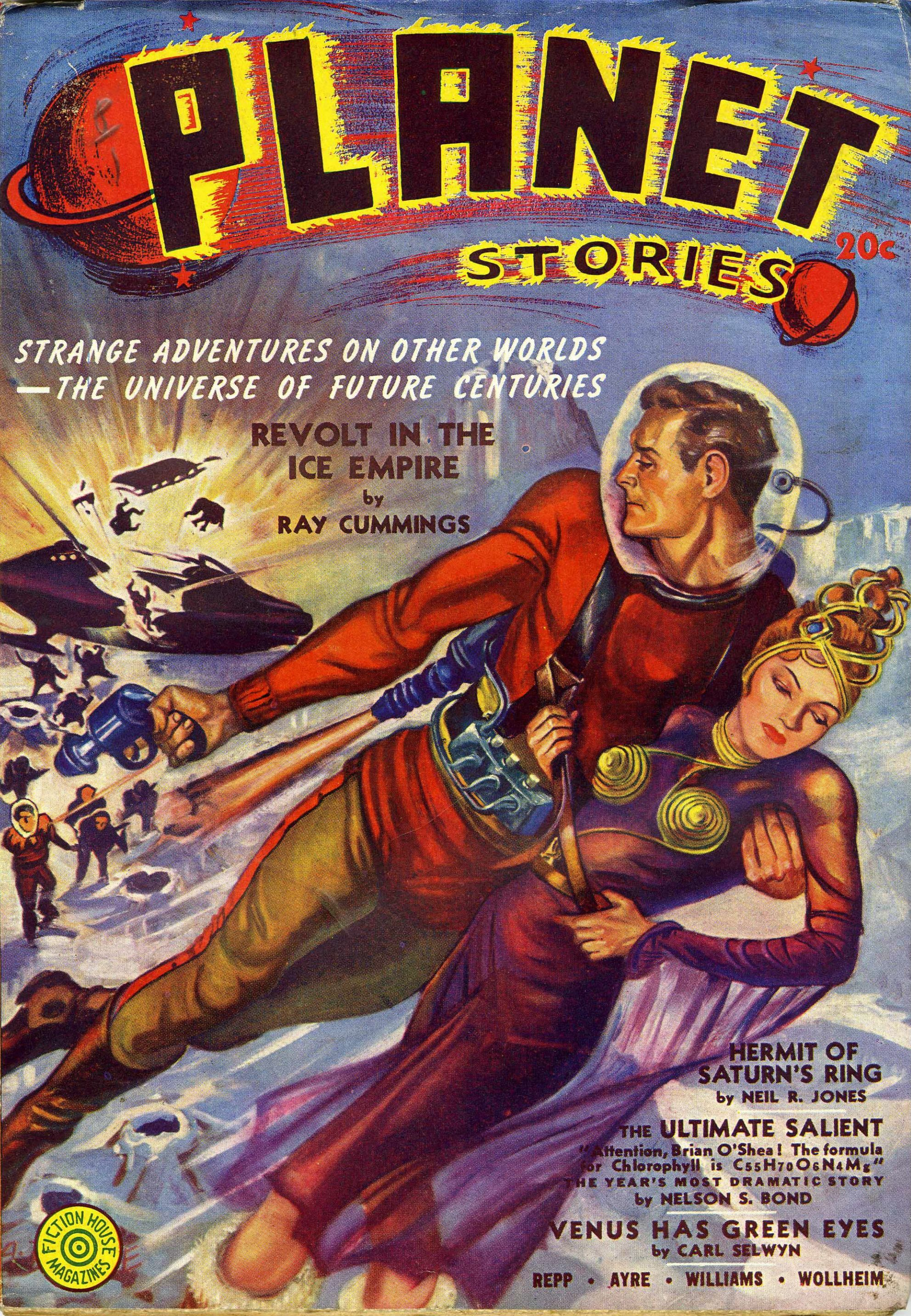
Planet Stories, a science fiction pulp published between 1939 and 1955

Pulp magazines often contained a wide variety of genre fiction, including, but not limited to:

- adventure
- aviation
- detective/mystery
- espionage
- fantasy
- gangster
- "girlie pulps", also called "saucy/spicy pulps" or "sex pulps" (including soft porn)
- horror/occult (including "weird menace")
- humor
- railroad
- romance
- science fiction
- série noire (French crime fiction)
- sports
- war
- Westerns (also see dime Westerns); the Colorado artist Arthur Roy Mitchell is particularly known for his sketches of the covers of such magazines.

The American Old West was a mainstay genre of early turn of the 20th-century novels as well as later pulp magazines, and lasted longest of all the traditional pulps. In many ways, the later men's adventure ("the sweats") was the replacement of pulps.

Many classic science fiction and crime novels were originally serialized in pulp magazines such as Weird Tales, Amazing Stories, and Black Mask.

== Notable original characters ==
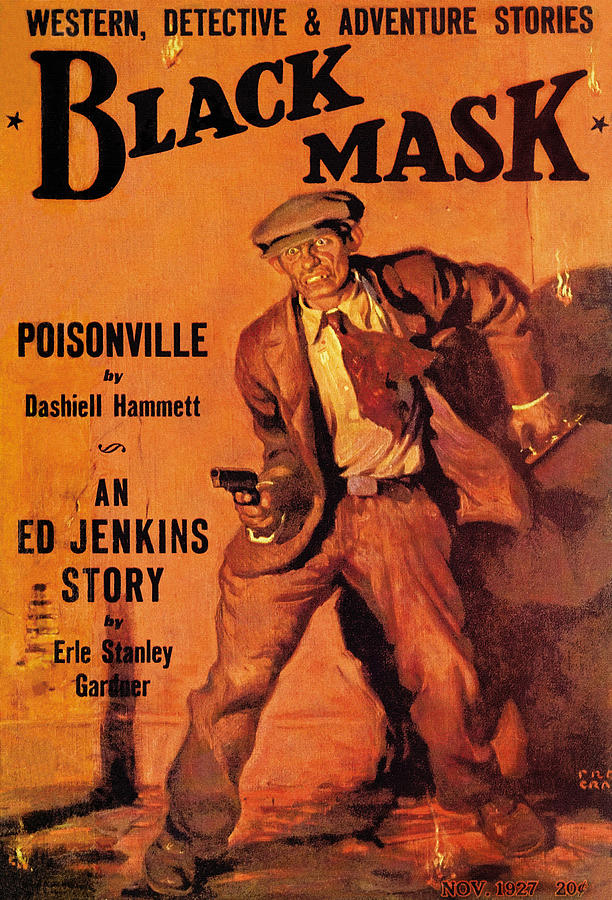
November 1927 issue of Black Mask, featuring The Continental Op

While the majority of pulp magazines were anthology titles featuring many different authors, characters and settings, some of the most enduring magazines were those that featured a single recurring character. These were often referred to as "hero pulps" because the recurring character was almost always a larger-than-life hero in the mold of Doc Savage or The Shadow.

Popular pulp characters that headlined in their own magazines:

- The Avenger
- The Black Bat
- Captain Future
- El Coyote
- Dan Turner, Hollywood Detective
- Doc Savage
- Doctor Death
- Dr. Yen Sin
- G-8
- Hopalong Cassidy
- Ka-Zar
- Lord Lister (aka Raffles)
- Nick Carter
- Operator No. 5
- The Phantom Detective
- Secret Agent X
- The Shadow
- The Spider

Popular pulp characters who appeared in anthology titles such as All-Story or Weird Tales:

- Biggles
- Bran Mak Morn
- Buck Rogers
- Conan the Barbarian
- The Continental Op
- Domino Lady
- The Eel
- Green Lama
- Jim Anthony
- John Carter of Mars
- Jules de Grandin
- Khlit the Cossack
- Kull
- Moon Man
- Sexton Blake
- Solomon Kane
- Tarzan
- Zorro

== Illustrators ==
Pulp covers were printed in color on higher-quality (slick) paper. They were famous for their half-dressed damsels in distress, usually awaiting a rescuing hero. Cover art played a major part in the marketing of pulp magazines. The early pulp magazines could boast covers by some distinguished American artists; The Popular Magazine had covers by N. C. Wyeth, and Edgar Franklin Wittmack contributed cover art to Argosy and Short Stories. Later, many artists specialized in creating covers mainly for the pulps; a number of the most successful cover artists became as popular as the authors featured on the interior pages. Among the most famous pulp artists were Walter M. Baumhofer, Earle K. Bergey, Margaret Brundage, Edd Cartier, Virgil Finlay, Frank R. Paul, Norman Saunders, Emmett Watson, Nick Eggenhofer, (who specialized in Western illustrations), Hugh J. Ward, George Rozen, and Rudolph Belarski. Covers were important enough to sales that sometimes they would be designed first; authors would then be shown the cover art and asked to write a story to match.

Later pulps began to feature interior illustrations, depicting elements of the stories. The drawings were printed in black ink on the same cream-colored paper used for the text, and had to use specific techniques to avoid blotting on the coarse texture of the cheap pulp. Thus, fine lines and heavy detail were usually not an option. Shading was by crosshatching or pointillism, and even that had to be limited and coarse. Usually the art was black lines on the paper's background, but Finlay and a few others did some work that was primarily white lines against large dark areas.

== Authors and editors ==
Another way pulps kept costs down was by paying authors less than other markets; thus many eminent authors started out in the pulps before they were successful enough to sell to better-paying markets, and similarly, well-known authors whose careers were slumping or who wanted a few quick dollars could bolster their income with sales to pulps. Additionally, some of the earlier pulps solicited stories from amateurs who were quite happy to see their words in print and could thus be paid token amounts.

There were also career pulp writers, capable of turning out huge amounts of prose on a steady basis, often with the aid of dictation to stenographers, machines or typists. Before he became a novelist, Upton Sinclair was turning out at least 8,000 words per day seven days a week for the pulps, keeping two stenographers fully employed. Pulps would often have their authors use multiple pen names so that they could use multiple stories by the same person in one issue, or use a given author's stories in three or more successive issues, while still appearing to have varied content. One advantage pulps provided to authors was that they paid upon acceptance for material instead of on publication. Since a story might be accepted months or even years before publication, to a working writer this was a crucial difference in cash flow.

Some pulp editors became known for cultivating good fiction and interesting features in their magazines. Preeminent pulp magazine editors included Arthur Sullivant Hoffman (Adventure), Robert H. Davis (All-Story Weekly), Harry E. Maule (Short Stories), Donald Kennicott (Blue Book), Joseph Shaw (Black Mask), Farnsworth Wright (Weird Tales, Oriental Stories), John W. Campbell (Astounding Science Fiction, Unknown) and Daisy Bacon (Love Story Magazine, Detective Story Magazine).

== Authors featured ==
Well-known authors who wrote for pulps include:

- Poul Anderson
- Isaac Asimov
- Charles Beadle
- H. Bedford-Jones
- Robert Leslie Bellem
- E. F. Benson
- Alfred Bester
- Robert Bloch
- B. M. Bower
- Leigh Brackett
- Ray Bradbury
- Max Brand
- William Brandon
- Fredric Brown
- George Bruce
- John Buchan
- F. R. Buckley
- Edgar Rice Burroughs
- William S. Burroughs
- Ellis Parker Butler
- Paul Cain
- Hugh B. Cave
- Paul Chadwick
- Raymond Chandler
- Agatha Christie
- Arthur C. Clarke
- Joseph Conrad
- Stephen Crane
- Harold F. Cruickshank
- Ray Cummings
- Tom Curry
- Carroll John Daly
- Lester Dent
- August Derleth
- Philip K. Dick
- J. Allan Dunn
- Lord Dunsany
- C. M. Eddy Jr.
- Arthur Guy Empey
- George Allan England
- Philip José Farmer
- C. S. Forester
- F. Scott Fitzgerald
- Arthur O. Friel
- Erle Stanley Gardner
- Walter B. Gibson
- David Goodis
- L. Patrick Greene
- Zane Grey
- Frank Gruber
- H. Rider Haggard
- Edmond Hamilton
- Dashiell Hammett
- Margie Harris
- Victor Headley
- Robert A. Heinlein
- O. Henry
- Frank Herbert
- Robert E. Howard
- L. Ron Hubbard
- Carl Jacobi
- John Jakes
- Ardyth Kennelly
- Donald Keyhoe
- Rudyard Kipling
- Henry Kuttner
- Harold Lamb
- Louis L'Amour
- Margery Lawrence
- Fritz Leiber
- Murray Leinster
- Elmore John Leonard
- Jack London
- H. P. Lovecraft
- Giles A. Lutz
- John D. MacDonald
- William Colt MacDonald
- Elmer Brown Mason
- F. Van Wyck Mason
- Horace McCoy
- Johnston McCulley
- Eldred Kurtz Means
- Merriam Modell
- C. L. Moore
- Frederick Ferdinand Moore
- Walt Morey
- Talbot Mundy
- Philip Francis Nowlan
- Fulton Oursler
- Frederick C. Painton
- Hugh Pendexter
- Emil Petaja
- E. Hoffmann Price
- Ellery Queen
- Seabury Quinn
- John H. Reese
- Arthur B. Reeve
- Tod Robbins
- Sax Rohmer
- Theodore Roscoe
- Rafael Sabatini
- Jackson Scholz
- Charles Alden Seltzer
- Stephen Shadegg
- Richard S. Shaver
- Robert Silverberg
- Bertrand William Sinclair
- Upton Sinclair
- Arthur D. Howden Smith
- Clark Ashton Smith
- E. E. Smith
- Mickey Spillane
- T. S. Stribling
- Jim Thompson
- Thomas Thursday
- W. C. Tuttle
- Mark Twain
- Jack Vance
- E. C. Vivian
- Edgar Wallace
- H. G. Wells
- Henry S. Whitehead
- Raoul Whitfield
- Tennessee Williams
- P. G. Wodehouse
- Cornell Woolrich
- Gordon Young

Sinclair Lewis, first American winner of the Nobel Prize in Literature, worked as an editor for Adventure, writing filler paragraphs (brief facts or amusing anecdotes designed to fill small gaps in page layout), advertising copy and a few stories.

== Publishers ==
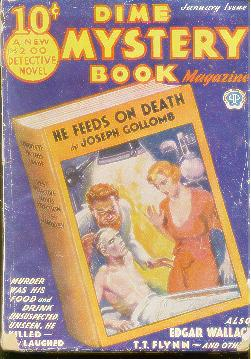
Cover of the pulp magazine Dime Mystery Book Magazine, January 1933

- A. A. Wyn's Magazine Publishers (Periodical House/Ace Magazines) published Secret Agent X, Flying Aces and others
- Better/Standard/Thrilling (The Thrilling Group) published Captain Future, Startling Stories, The Phantom Detective, and The Black Bat.
- William Clayton published Ginger Stories, Pep Stories and Snappy Stories
- Columbia Publications published Future Science Fiction, Science Fiction, and Science Fiction Quarterly
- Dell Publishing published I Confess
- Doubleday, Page and Company published Short Stories, West and The Frontier
- Fiction House published Planet Stories
- Frank A. Munsey Co. published Argosy
- Harold Hersey published Gangster Stories
- Harry Donenfeld's Culture Publications published Spicy Detective, Spicy Mystery and Spicy Adventure
- Hugo Gernsback published Amazing Stories and Wonder Stories
- J. C. Henneberger's Rural Publications published Weird Tales and Oriental Tales
- Martin Goodman published Ka-Zar, Marvel Tales and Marvel Science Stories
- Hutchinson, main publisher of UK pulps
- Popular Publications published The Spider, G-8, Horror Stories, Black Mask, True Love and later Argosy
- The Ridgway Company published Adventure, Everybody's Magazine and Romance
- Street & Smith published Astounding, Unknown, Doc Savage and The Shadow
- Courtland Young's C.H. Young Publishing published Breezy Stories

== Legacy ==
The term pulp fiction is often used for mass market paperbacks since the 1950s. The Browne Popular Culture Library News noted:

Many of the paperback houses that contributed to the decline of the genre–Ace, Dell, Avon, among others–were actually started by pulp magazine publishers. They had the presses, the expertise, and the newsstand distribution networks which made the success of the mass-market paperback possible. These pulp-oriented paperback houses mined the old magazines for reprints. This kept pulp literature, if not pulp magazines, alive. The Return of the Continental Op reprints material first published in Black Mask; Five Sinister Characters contains stories first published in Dime Detective; and The Pocket Book of Science Fiction collects material from Thrilling Wonder Stories, Astounding Science Fiction and Amazing Stories. But note that mass market paperbacks are not pulps.

In 1991, The Pulpster debuted at that year's Pulpcon, the annual pulp magazine convention that had begun in 1972. The magazine, devoted to the history and legacy of the pulp magazines, has been published each year since. It now appears in connection with PulpFest, the summer pulp convention that grew out of and replaced Pulpcon. The Pulpster was originally edited by Tony Davis and is currently edited by William Lampkin, who also runs the website ThePulp.Net. Contributors have included Don Hutchison, Robert Sampson, Will Murray, Al Tonik, Nick Carr, Mike Resnick, Hugh B. Cave, Joseph Wrzos, Jessica Amanda Salmonson, Chet Williamson, and many others.

In 1992, Rich W. Harvey came out with a magazine called Pulp Adventures which reprinted old classics. The magazine came out regularly until 2001, and then started up again in 2014.

In 1994, Quentin Tarantino directed the film Pulp Fiction. The working title of the film was Black Mask, in homage to the pulp magazine of that name, and it embodied the seedy, violent, often crime-related spirit found in pulp magazines.

In 1997 C. Cazadessus Jr. launched Pulpdom, a continuation of his Hugo Award-winning ERB-dom which began in 1960. It ran for 75 issues and featured articles about the content and selected fiction from the pulps. It became Pulpdom Online in 2013 and continues quarterly publication.

After 2000, several small independent publishers released magazines which published short fiction, either short stories or novel-length presentations, in the tradition of the pulp magazines of the early 20th century. These included Blood 'N Thunder, High Adventure and a short-lived magazine which revived the title Argosy. These specialist publications, printed in limited press runs, were pointedly not printed on the brittle, high-acid wood pulp paper of the old publications and were not mass market publications targeted at a wide audience. In 2004, Lost Continent Library published Secret of the Amazon Queen by E.A. Guest, their first contribution to a "New Pulp Era", featuring the hallmarks of pulp fiction for contemporary mature readers: violence, horror and sex. E.A. Guest was likened to a blend of pulp-era icon Talbot Mundy and Stephen King by real-life explorer David Hatcher Childress.

In 2002, the tenth issue of McSweeney's Quarterly was guest edited by Michael Chabon. Published as McSweeney's Mammoth Treasury of Thrilling Tales, it is a collection of "pulp fiction" stories written by such current well-known authors as Stephen King, Nick Hornby, Aimee Bender, and Dave Eggers. Explaining his vision for the project, Chabon wrote in the introduction, "I think that we have forgotten how much fun reading a short story can be, and I hope that if nothing else, this treasury goes some small distance toward reminding us of that lost but fundamental truth."

The Scottish publisher DC Thomson publishes "My Weekly Compact Novel" every week. It is literally a pulp novel, though it does not fall into the hard-edged genre most associated with pulp fiction.

From 2006 through 2019, Anthony Tollin's imprint Sanctum Books has reprinted all 182 Doc Savage pulp novels, all 24 of Paul Ernst's Avenger novels, the 14 Whisperer novels from the original pulp series and all but three novels of the entire run of The Shadow (most of his publications featuring two novels in one book).

== See also ==
- B movie
- Crimefighters
- Dime novel
- George Kelley Paperback and Pulp Fiction Collection
- Hard Case Crime
- Il Giallo Mondadori
- Science fiction magazine

== Sources ==
- Chambliss, Julian and William Svitavsky, "From Pulp Hero to Superhero: Culture, Race, and Identity in AmericanPopular Culture, 1900–1940," Studies in American Culture 30 (1) (October 2008). Archived March 30, 2012, at the Wayback Machine
- Ellis, Doug. Uncovered: The Hidden Art of the Girlie Pulps – Gold Medal Winner for Best Popular Culture Book BEA 2004 (Adventure House, −2003) ISBN 1-886937-74-5
- Gunnison, Locke and Ellis. Adventure House Guide to the Pulps (Adventure House, 2000) ISBN 1-886937-45-1
- Hersey, Harold. The New Pulpwood Editor (Adventure House, 2003) ISBN 1-886937-68-0
- Lesser, Robert. Pulp Art: Original Cover Paintings for the Great American Pulp Magazines (Book Sales, 2003) ISBN 0-7858-1707-7
- Locke, John-editor. Pulp Fictioneers – Adventures in the Storytelling Business (Adventure House, 2004) ISBN 1-886937-83-4
- Locke, John-editor. Pulpwood Days – Vol. 1 Editors You Want To Know (Off-Trail Publications, 2007) ISBN 0-9786836-2-5
- Parfrey, Adam, et al. It's a Man's World: Men's Adventure Magazines, the Postwar Pulps (Feral House, 2003) ISBN 0-922915-81-4
- Robinson, Frank and Davidson, Lawrence. Pulp Culture (Collector's Press, 2007) ISBN 978-1-933112-30-5
