= Fanny Ellsworth =

American magazine editor

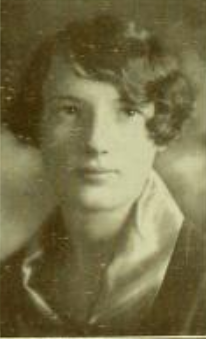
- Fanny Ellsworth, from a 1926 yearbook
- Born: October 10, 1904; New York
- Died: 1984
- Other names: Fanny Davis (after 1934)
- Occupation(s): Magazine editor, Turkish studies scholar

Fanny Louise Ellsworth Davis (October 10, 1904 – 1984), known professionally as Fanny Ellsworth, was an American magazine editor, best known as the editor of pulp magazines including Ranch Romances (for western romances) and Black Mask (for noir detective thrillers). Late in life, she became a Turkish studies scholar, interested in the status of women in the Ottoman Empire.

== Early life and education ==
Fanny Louise Ellsworth was born in New York City, the daughter of Jesse F. Ellsworth and Martha Kelly Ellsworth. Her father was a banker. She graduated from Barnard College in 1926. Later in life, Fanny Ellsworth Davis completed doctoral studies at Columbia University, with a dissertation titled "Two Centuries of the Ottoman Lady" (1968).

== Career ==
=== Pulp fiction ===
Ellsworth was the editor of Ranch Romances, from the 1920s into the 1950s. She bought over 30 western stories from Elmer Kelton for Ranch Romances; other noted authors she published included Lela Cole Kitson, Walt Coburn and Max Brand. She also worked with western genre artist Harold Dowd Bugbee.

As "F. Ellsworth", she succeeded Joseph Shaw as editor of Black Mask, a magazine for detective fiction, from 1936 to 1940, promoting noir genre authors including Steve Fisher, Frank Gruber, and Cornell Woolrich. She was managing editor and briefly executive editor of Thrilling Wonder Stories from 1952 to 1953. Other magazines she worked at as an editor included Big Story Magazine, Rangeland Love Story Magazine, Thrilling Ranch Stories, Western Love Stories, Western Rodeo Romances, Space Stories, Startling Stories, and Fantastic Story Magazine. In the late 1950s, she was advertising manager for the Barnard Alumnae Magazine.

Ellsworth is best known as an editor, but she also wrote several pulp stories, including "Winter Night" (Street & Smith's Love Story Magazine 1941), and "A Toast to All of Us" (Ranch Romances 1949).

=== Turkish studies ===
Fanny Ellsworth Davis became interested in Turkish history while writing a children's book, Getting to Know Turkey (1957). She published books based on her doctoral work, The Palace of Topkapi in Istanbul (1970), The Clocks and watches of the Topkapı Palace Museum (1984), and The Ottoman Lady: A social history from 1718 to 1918 (published posthumously in 1986).

== Personal life ==
In 1934, Fanny Ellsworth married fellow magazine editor John Earle "Jack" Davis.
