= Eggenhofer =

Eggenhofer is a surname. Notable people with the surname include:

- Markus Eggenhofer (born 1987), Austrian ski jumper
- Nick Eggenhofer (1897–1985), German-born American artist
