= Gambling Ship (1933 film) =

1933 film

- Film poster
- Directed by: Louis J. Gasnier; Max Marcin
- Written by: Claude Binyon; Max Marcin
- Starring: Cary Grant; Benita Hume
- Cinematography: Charles Lang
- Distributed by: Paramount Pictures
- Release date: June 23, 1933
- Running time: 72 minutes
- Country: United States
- Language: English

Gambling Ship is a 1933 American pre-Code drama film directed by Louis J. Gasnier and Max Marcin, and starring Cary Grant and Benita Hume. It was based on Paul Cain's short stories: "Fast One", "Lead Party", "Velvet" and "The Heat", which were published in Black Mask magazine. It was released on June 23, 1933. Ace Corbin retires from the racket as a gambling boss, but the enemies attempt to stop him.

== Plot ==
Ace Corbin, a charming Chicago gangster, is acquitted of murder charges, for which he was framed by Pete Manning. He decides to reform and begin a new life in California. On the train, he falls in love with Eleanor La Velle, a gambler's girlfriend. They both conceal their true identities. In Southern California, Eleanor discovers that her lover, Joe Burke, owner of the Casino Del Mar steamer, which operates legally outside the three-mile limit, is in debt for $9,000 because Pete Manning's thugs are ruining his business.

Eleanor chooses to remain loyal and help Joe with his business, rather than leave him for Ace. Joe and his right-hand man Blooey offer to turn over the casino to Ace so he can improve the business and seek vengeance on Manning. Ace resists becoming involved until Manning's men threaten him. When Ace runs the casino, he has the water taxis bring Manning's patrons to his steamship instead. The first evening, Ace encounters Eleanor on board the ship and she discovers his true identity. Eleanor, who is still in love with Ace, remains on the ship, even after Manning's men cause an explosion and fire on board.

After the fire is out, Ace and Eleanor remains on board for the night. In the morning, the district attorney questions them both, and Ace discovers Eleanor's real identity, including her relationship with Joe. Also in attendance is Joe, who likewise discovers Ace and Eleanor's relationship. Back aboard the casino steamship, during a storm Joe and Ace accuse Eleanor of being a two-timer and lying to them both. Meanwhile, Manning and his men sneak aboard and kill Joe. Blooey releases the anchor, and the crashing waves wash Manning and his men off the deck. Ace, Blooey, and Eleanor jump to safety with life preservers. Later, Ace and Eleanor marry.

== Cast ==
- Cary Grant as Ace Corbin
- Benita Hume as Eleanor La Velle
- Jack La Rue as Pete Manning
- Glenda Farrell as Jeanne Sands
- Roscoe Karns as Blooey
- Arthur Vinton as Joe Burke
- Charles Williams as Baby Face
- Edwin Maxwell as D.A.
- Spencer Charters as Detective

== Production ==
Carole Lombard was considered for the role of Eleanor La Velle. A technical advisor, known as "Mr. 100" to maintain his anonymity, familiarized the actors with the "details of the parlance, activities, and manners of the gambling world". Some of the scenes in the movie were filmed in San Pedro, California.

== Reception ==
The New York Times film review said: "For this stale and profitless narrative, the producers have gathered an attractive cast. Although they are wasted in the leading rôles, Cary Grant is a likable and intelligent actor and Benita Hume is a charming British actress. Roscoe Karns is helpful on the humorous side and Jack La Rue gives one of his vivid reptilian performances as the leader of the opposition gang."

== Home media ==
Gambling Ship was released on DVD on September 28, 2016.
