= Smith & Wesson Triple Lock =

Smith & Wesson "Triple Lock"
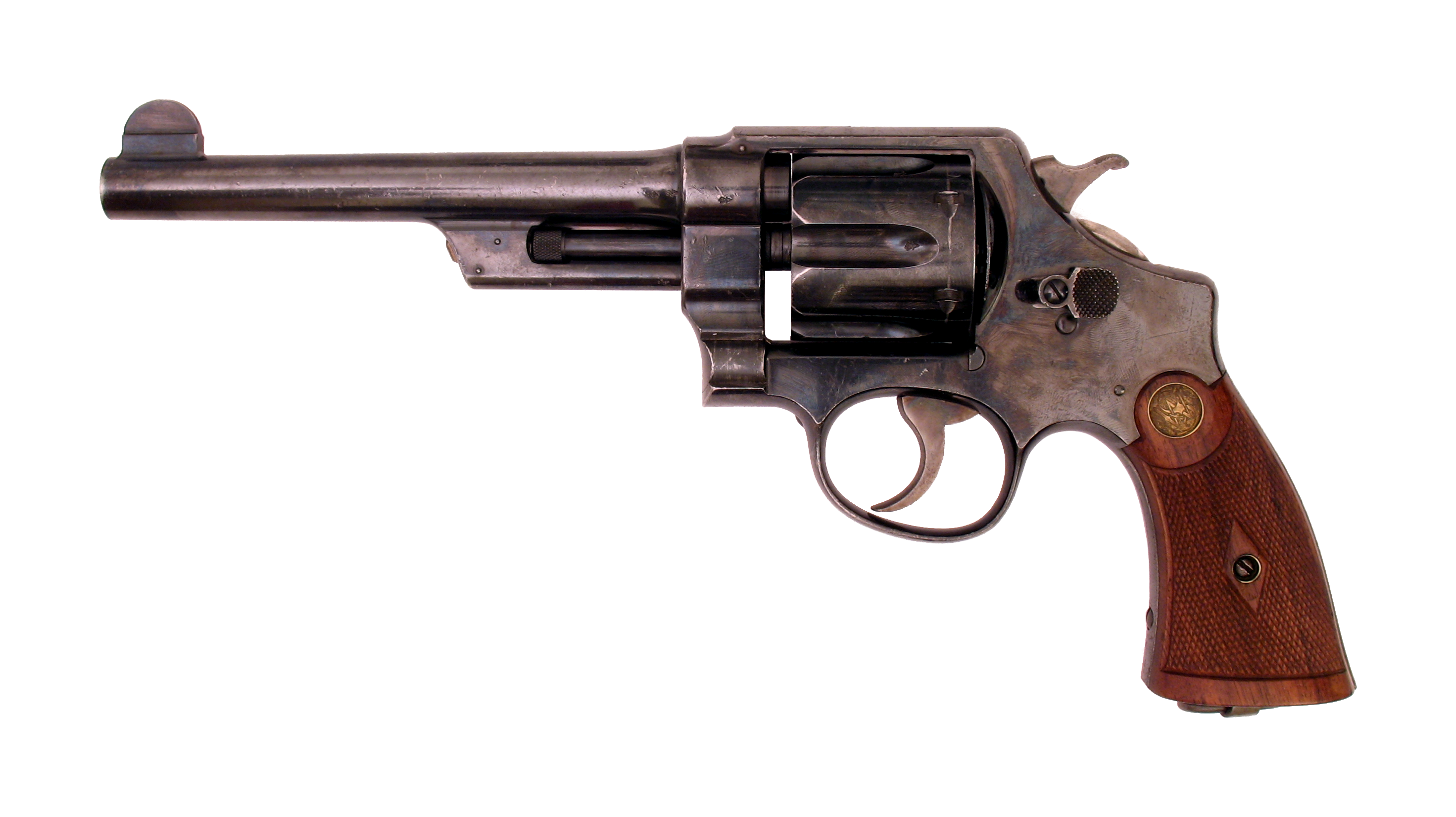
- Smith & Wesson .44 Hand Ejector 1st Model New Century or "Triple Lock"
- Type: Revolver
- Place of origin: United States

Specifications
- Cartridge: .44 Special & .455 Webley
- Feed system: 6-round cylinder

The Triple Lock, officially the Smith & Wesson .44 Hand Ejector 1st Model New Century, is a double-action revolver. It was and is considered by many, including handgun enthusiast and expert Elmer Keith, to be the finest revolver ever made.

Its popular name refers to its extra (third) locking lug on the cylinder crane. This extra locking mechanism was deemed necessary due to the increased power of the .44 Special cartridge (a lengthened .44 Russian and the parent of the .44 Magnum), first chambered in the Triple Lock.

== History ==
The .44 is part of the model name, regardless of the specific calibre of chambering of any individual revolver, and Hand Ejector differentiated the new design from Smith & Wesson's earlier top break revolvers. These 19th-century designs had an automatic ejector mechanism actuated when the frame was tipped up. The newer Hand Ejector models required the user to depress a plunger to eject spent cartridge cases. The New Century designation was in recognition of its status as Smith & Wesson's first 20th century design.

It was only manufactured between 1908 and 1915, for a total of 15,376 revolvers, a stock that sold out completely by 1917. It was replaced by a .44 Hand Ejector 2nd Model, most visibly different in lacking the ejector shroud and third locking lug.

Smith & Wesson changed the design for two primary reasons: customer demand and cost. The British and Canadian militaries pressed for the removal of the third locking lug due to concerns that the precision mechanism would collect dirt and cause the gun to malfunction. Additionally, this change and the removal of the ejector shroud simplified manufacturing, allowing Smith & Wesson to drop the price of the gun by two dollars: Whereas the Hand Ejector 1st Model was $21, the 2nd Model was $19. The ejector shroud was reintroduced in 1926 for the Hand Ejector 3rd Model, but the Triple Lock feature was never used again.

== British and Commonwealth World War I service ==
To cover manufacturing shortages of the Webley Mk VI, early in the war the Ministry of Munitions contracted Colt and Smith & Wesson to manufacture revolvers chambered in .455 Webley. Smith & Wesson were given an initial contract to manufacture 5,000 triple lock pistols, known as the Pistol Smith & Wesson .455 with 6 1/2 inch barrel Mark I, it was introduced into British service as a "substitute standard" sidearm on 5 July 1915 alongside the Colt New Service. Subsequent orders, lacking the third locking lug and ejector shroud, totalled 69,755 and were known as the Mark II.

== In popular culture ==
The Triple Lock is the favored weapon of Carroll John Daly’s fictional hardboiled detective Race Williams, launched in 1923. He carries two, one holstered under each shoulder.
