= Triple lock =

Triple lock may refer to:

- Smith & Wesson Triple Lock, double-action revolver
- The method of determining the annual increase in the UK Basic State Pension
- Triple lock (Irish Defence Forces), legal requirements for deployment abroad of Irish troops
