= Paul Cain (pen name) =

American writer, pen name of George C. Sims

George Caryl Sims
- Born: May 30, 1902; Des Moines, Iowa
- Died: June 23, 1966 (aged 64); North Hollywood, California
- Occupations: Novelist; short story writer; screenwriter
- Writing career
- Pen name: Paul Cain, Peter Ruric
- Genres: hardboiled crime fiction, mystery fiction
- Notable works: Fast One (1933); Seven Slayers (1946)

George Caryl Sims (May 30, 1902 – June 23, 1966), better known by his pen names Paul Cain and Peter Ruric, was an American pulp fiction author and screenwriter. He is best known for his novel Fast One, which is considered to be a landmark of the pulp fiction genre and was called the "high point in the ultra hard-boiled manner" by Raymond Chandler. Lee Server, author of the Encyclopedia of Pulp Fiction Writers, called Fast One "a cold-hearted, machine-gun-paced masterwork" and his other writings "gemlike, stoic and merciless vignettes that seemed to come direct from the bootlegging front lines."

Sims enjoyed a brief career in Hollywood as a screenwriter during the 1930s and 1940s, including writing the screenplay for the Boris Karloff vehicle The Black Cat.

== Career ==
The events of Sims' life have been difficult for later biographers to verify, in part because of his obscurity and in part because during his life, he frequently embellished his story with colorful and even outlandish statements, such as that he "wandered over South America, Europe, northern Africa and the Near East" and had published books titled Young Man Sees God, Hypersensualism: A Practical Philosophy for Acrobats and Seven Men Named Caesar, none of which is true. He claimed in a letter to Black Mask editor Joseph Shaw that he had been a professional balloonist, as well as a gambler, painter, sailor, and editor.

Sims was born in Des Moines, Iowa, on May 30, 1902. His father was a former police detective and drugstore owner. His mother divorced his father and moved with her son to Los Angeles, probably in 1921 (some sources say 1918), joined by Sims' father several years later. Sims himself seems to have been less settled; he apparently lived in Detroit and Chicago during part of this time. He also enlisted in the U.S. Navy Reserve in 1917, but was discharged in 1921 (more than two years early) for “inaptitude.”

In the mid-1920s, Sims began using the pseudonym he'd use for the rest of his life, "Peter Ruric" (beginning first as "George Ruric"). He also began his career in Hollywood, including working as an assistant on the Josef von Sternberg films The Salvation Hunters (1925) and A Woman of the Sea (1926). Actress Myrna Loy (born Myrna Williams) gave credit in her autobiography to Sims, who she apparently knew as "Peter Rurick, a wild Russian writer of free verse”, with inventing her stage name. Los Angeles Review of Books editor Boris Dralyuk (who wrote the introduction to 2013's The Paul Cain Omnibus) suggests that Ruric was inspired by the name of British poet Mina Loy for the actress' new name, and that his own pseudonym came from Russians Peter the Great and Rurik, founder of the Rurikid dynasty.

He lived in New York circa 1930, where he had become an alcoholic in a dysfunctional relationship with actress Gertrude Michael. Here, he became involved in pulp magazines such as Black Mask, for which he wrote a total of 17 stories. Editor Joseph Shaw considered him one of the magazine's strongest contributors, and a successor to Dashiell Hammett. Sims left the magazine when Shaw was fired in 1936. Additionally, Sims had stories published in Detective Fiction Weekly and Star Detective Magazine, and several articles in Gourmet.

Black Mask first published Fast One as five novelettes in 1932, "Fast One", "Lead Party", "Velvet", "The Heat", and "The Dark". He then rewrote them into a single novel, which became Fast One, published in book form by Doubleday in October 1933. The story follows gangster Gerry Kells as he navigates, and instigates, a bloody gang war in Los Angeles. Sims dedicated the novel to Michael, who probably inspired the character of the alcoholic girlfriend of the protagonist. The 1933 Cary Grant film Gambling Ship is based on those stories. The New York Times described it as “a ceaseless welter of bloodshed and frenzy, a sustained bedlam of killing and fiendishness, told in terse staccato style.” Sims and Michael broke up in 1933. Fast One sold poorly and received mixed critical reviews, and Sims never wrote another novel. However, its reputation has grown increasingly over time, and it is now considered a classic of the genre. In 2016, The Los Angeles Review of Books called Fast One part of "a protean time for crime fiction", and praised the novel as "one hell of a twisty, tough nihilistic story set in 1932-’33 Los Angeles."

Sims continued to work as a screenwriter in Hollywood under the name "Peter Ruric", contributing not only the script for 1934's The Black Cat, his most famous movie, but 1934's Affairs of a Gentleman, 1942's Grand Central Murder, and 1944's Guy de Maupassant adaptation Mademoiselle Fifi.

In 1946, a paperback collection of his best stories called Seven Slayers was published by Saint Enterprises. Sims wanted to change his listed name to Ruric but the publisher insisted on sticking with the name Cain.

== Writing style ==
In the field of hardboiled noir fiction, a genre already known for its starkness and cynicism, Sims' writing as Paul Cain was notable for its cold, brutal nihilism. Comparing Cain with other masters of the genre such as Raymond Chandler, Boris Dralyuk said that, "Stacked pound-for-pound against Cain’s lean and war-hardened antihero Gerry Kells, Chandler’s Philip Marlowe comes off like a flabby, eccentric chatterbox." Dralyuk has also noted that Cain's work often features "fits of misogyny" and "laconic indications of buried trauma, resentment, and addiction." Wall Street Journal reviewer Lee Sandlin was more negative, calling him derivative of his Black Mask predecessor Hammett: "Cain wasn't any good. His prose is pitched, page after page, at exactly the same volume: a shrill, pounding staccato that can barely spare time for conjunctions." Genre historian David E. Wilt called Cain's prose "competent though not outstanding", with the exception of the five Fast One stories. Nevertheless, Cain has been rediscovered and critically praised in recent years, with his complete works collected in The Paul Cain Omnibus and reprints of Fast One and Seven Slayers.

Cain's protagonists were unsentimental, brooding, compulsive antiheroes capable of remarkable levels of violence. The 1933 New York Times review of Fast One called the lead character, gangster Gerry Kells, "so ferocious a hoodlum ... a sot, drug addict, two-gun deadshot." Rather than traditional detectives, most Cain protagonists were gangsters or at least on the wrong side of the law. Washington Post literary critic Michael Dirda called Cain's style "lean, stripped-down prose, affectless narrative voice" leavened by touches of "wry humor". He noted that "The narrative's point of view is nearly always external: People talk, actions are starkly described, no explanations are given, and we can only guess what Kells or other characters are thinking. The prose is similar to Hemingway's, but even leaner."

Cain's noir stories were among the first in the genre to be set in Los Angeles. Fast One included a scene set at the iconic restaurant and writer hangout Musso & Frank Grill. Several stories are set in the world of Hollywood, and feature lead characters who work in or near the movie industry.

== Personal life ==
Sims married Virginia Maxine Glau in 1939, changing her name to Mechel Ruric; she was nearly 20 years his junior. The marriage dissolved in 1943 due to his alcoholism. He married again in 1945 or 1946 to writer Virginia Radcliffe, with whom he collaborated on several radio scripts; that marriage lasted until about 1950. In 1955, now living in Europe and suffering from poor health, Sims married again, this time to a young Virginia woman named Peggy Gregson who was 30 years younger than him; the couple had two sons. They moved to California and then Virginia, where she stayed; he moved on to Cuba and Los Angeles again, and she remarried in 1962.

He called himself Peter Ruric, rather than George Sims, for most of his life. The friend who settled his affairs after his death, in fact, did not know that his original name was George Sims.

== Death ==
Sims died of cancer in North Hollywood in 1966.
