= Ticket to a Crime =

1934 film directed by Lewis D. Collins

- Directed by: Lewis D. Collins
- Written by: Carroll John Daly; John T. Neville; Charles A. Logue
- Produced by: Max Alexander; Peter E. Kassler
- Starring: Ralph Graves; Lois Wilson; Lola Lane
- Cinematography: Gilbert Warrenton
- Edited by: S. Roy Luby; George M. Merrick; Holbrook N. Todd
- Music by: Lee Zahler
- Production company: Beacon Productions
- Distributed by: Beacon Productions
- Release date: December 15, 1934
- Running time: 67 minutes
- Country: United States
- Language: English

Ticket to a Crime is a 1934 American mystery film directed by Lewis D. Collins and starring Ralph Graves, Lois Wilson and Lola Lane. A private detective and his assistant solve a murder at a country club.

The plot is based on pulp-fiction crime writer Carroll John Daly's 1934 short story of the same title, originally published in the magazine Dime Detective. Although Daly was one of the most popular pulp writers of his day, Ticket to a Crime was the only time his work was adapted to film.

== Cast ==
- Ralph Graves as Clay Holt
- Lois Wilson as Elaine Purdy
- Lola Lane as Peggy Cummings
- James Burke as Detective Lt. John Aloysius McGinnis
- Charles Ray as Courtney Mallory
- Edward Earle as Willis Purdy
- Hyram A. Hoover as Jerry Papolas
- John Elliott as Mr. Davidson

== Bibliography ==
- Larry Langman & Daniel Finn. A Guide to American Crime Films of the Thirties. Greenwood Press, 1995.
