= William Brandon (author) =

American writer, lawyer and historian

William Edward Brandon (September 21, 1914 – April 11, 2002) was an American writer and historian best known for his work about Native Americans and the American West.

== Early life ==
Brandon was born in Kokomo, Indiana, but spent his childhood in various locales, including the Yucatán and New Mexico. He held a brief job in a steel mill, before he began working as a professional writer in 1938, although this was interrupted by his service as a photographer for the United States Army Air Forces in the Pacific Theater during World War II.

== Works ==
Brandon published a variety of short fiction, essays, and poetry, which appeared initially in pulp magazines such as Black Mask, and Detective Fiction Weekly, but subsequently in prominent publications such as Esquire, The Atlantic Monthly, The Paris Review, The Saturday Evening Post, and Reader's Digest.

By the 1950s, he began pursuing his interest in non-fiction writing and in 1955 produced an account of John Charles Frémont's 1848 attempt to cross the Rocky Mountains in his book The Men and the Mountain.

Although Brandon's formal education ended after high school, his scholarship was sufficiently respected that he was from 1966–1967 a visiting professor at the University of Massachusetts Amherst, and later conducted a seminar series on Native American literature at California State College in Long Beach, California.

== Death and legacy ==
Brandon died in Clearlake, California, on April 11, 2002, of cancer. His last book, The Rise and Fall of North American Indians: From Prehistory Through Geronimo, was published posthumously the year after his death.

== Literary works ==
- The Dangerous Dead (1943) Dodd, Mead & Company
- The Men and the Mountain (1955) ISBN 0-8371-5873-7. An account of Frémont's failed fourth expedition.
- The American Heritage Book of Indians (1961) ISBN 0-517-39180-5. (short introduction by John F. Kennedy)
- The Magic World: American Indian Songs and Poems (1971) ISBN 0-8214-0991-3
- The Last Americans: The Indian in American Culture (1974) ISBN 0-07-007201-9
- New Worlds for Old: Reports from the New World and Their Effect on the Development of Social Thought in Europe, 1500–1800 (1986) ISBN 0-8214-0818-6
- Quivira: Europeans in the Region of the Santa Fe Trail, 1540–1820 (1991) ISBN 0-8214-0950-6
- The Rise and Fall of North American Indians: From Prehistory Through Geronimo (2003) ISBN 1-58979-211-4
