= Private Detective 62 =

1933 film by Michael Curtiz

- Theatrical release poster
- Directed by: Michael Curtiz
- Screenplay by: Rian James
- Story by: Raoul Whitfield
- Starring: William Powell
- Cinematography: Tony Gaudio
- Edited by: Harold McLernon
- Music by: Bernhard Kaun
- Distributed by: Warner Bros. Pictures
- Release date: June 10, 1933
- Running time: 66 minutes
- Country: United States
- Language: English

Private Detective 62 is a 1933 American pre-Code detective film directed by Michael Curtiz and starring William Powell as a private detective who falls for a woman whom he has been hired to frame in a scandal.

== Plot ==
In France, U.S. State Department employee Donald Free is caught trying to steal French state papers. Free is released from his job and is deported. However, when the cattle ship reaches New York, the captain informs him that he is to be returned to France. Free manages to jump overboard.

Ashore, he breaks into a house occupied by a married woman and her lover. Dan Hogan, a crooked and incompetent private detective working for the woman's husband, breaks in, but Free appears and pretends to be the owner of the house. He deceives Hogan into thinking that the woman is merely there to rent his place.

In 1933, Free is unable to find another job during the Great Depression. He convinces Hogan to become his partner. Without Free's knowledge, Hogan is financed by gangster Tony Bandor and business booms.

Bandor complains that society woman Janet Reynolds is winning too much at his gambling tables and then hires Hogan to uncover some sort of scandal that he can use to prevent Reynolds from collecting her winnings. Hogan engages Free without telling him the true purpose of the request.

While keeping an eye on Reynolds, Free falls in love with her. When Reynolds informs Bandor that she wants to collect her winnings, Hogan suggests to Bandor that they fool Reynolds into thinking that she has killed Bandor under suspicious conditions. Hogan double-crosses Bandor by hiring a thug to shoot him after Reynolds leaves the apartment. Reynolds seeks Free's assistance. Free learns the identity of Bandor's actual killer and traces him back to Hogan. Meanwhile, Hogan tries to blackmail Janet. After Free has Hogan arrested, he is offered his old job again, but tells Reynolds that it is not the sort of life that he could ask anyone to share with him, so he leaves. As he is departing, Reynolds proposes marriage to him and he accepts.

== Cast ==
- William Powell as Free
- Margaret Lindsay as Janet
- Ruth Donnelly as Amy [Hogan's assistant]
- Gordon Westcott as Bandor
- Arthur Hohl as Hogan
- Natalie Moorhead as Helen
- James Bell as Whitey
- Hobart Cavanaugh as Burns
- Irving Bacon as taxi driver
- Charles Lane as process server
- Toby Wing as Free's girlfriend (uncredited)

== Production ==
The film's working titles were Private Detective and Man Killer. It was shot over the course of 21 days at a cost of $260,000. Modern sources list Hal B. Wallis as the supervisor of production.
