= Gordon Young (writer) =

American writer (1886–1948)

Gordon Young (1886 – February 10, 1948) was an American writer of adventure and western stories.

== Life ==
Young was born in Ray County, Missouri. He worked as a cowboy and served in the United States Marine Corps in the Philippines, before moving to Los Angeles and taking a job at the Los Angeles Times in 1914. During his time in Los Angeles, Young befriended the writer Paul Jordan-Smith and the painter Edward Middleton Manigault. Young eventually became Literary Editor of the Los Angeles Times; one of his correspondents was Sinclair Lewis.

He died of a heart attack in Los Angeles, February 10, 1948.

== Writing career ==
Young's first published story was "The Lady's Picture", in The Cavalier magazine, in March 1913. He began writing fiction for the magazine Adventure in 1917. His first stories for Adventure were a series of crime thrillers about a gun-wielding gambler, Don Everhard. Magazine historian Robert Sampson argued the Don Everhard stories influenced later writers of Hardboiled crime fiction such as Carroll John Daly. Young soon became one of the most popular of Arthur Sullivant Hoffman's roster of authors for Adventure. He followed the Everhard stories with a series of South Seas tales about Hurricane Williams, an adventurer who shuns "civilized" society.

Young's novel, Days of '49 (1925), a historical narrative about the settlement of California during the Gold Rush, was well received by contemporary reviewers. James Oliver Curwood declared that Days of '49 was "the best book he had read for ten years", while Edwin Bjorkman compared Young's work to that of Walter Scott. Huroc the Avenger is a historical adventure set in the seventeenth century, and revolves around the titular hero's quest for revenge against a ruthless Venetian trading family.

Young's humorous Westerns about "Red" Clark became his most commercially successful series; these tales first appeared in Adventure and Short Stories before being collected in book form. The Clark stories were especially popular in Britain and most of the stories appeared in hardbacks for the UK library market.

Several of Gordon Young's stories were adapted for the cinema, including the 1936 film Captain Calamity and the 1944 film Tall in the Saddle.

== Bibliography ==
- Savages (1921)
- Wild Blood (1921)
- Hurricane Williams (1922)
- Crooked Shadows (1924)
- Seibert of the Island (1925)
- Vengeance of Hurricane Williams (1925)
- Days of '49 (1925)
- Pearl-Hunger (1927)
- Treasure (1928)
- Fighting Blood (UK Title: The Fighting Fool) (1932)
- Devil's Passport (1933)
- Red Clark o' Tulluco (1933)
- Red Clark Rides Alone (1933)
- Red Clark of the Arrowhead (1935)
- Huroc the Avenger (1936)
- Red Clark on the border (1937)
- Red Clark, Range Boss (UK Title: Red Clark, Boss!) (1938)
- Red Clark, Two-Gun Man (1939)
- Red Clark for Luck (1940)
- Mr. Beamish (1940)
- Red Clark takes a hand (1941)
- Iron Rainbow (1942)
- Tall In the Saddle (1943)
- Holster Law: Red Clark on the Frontier (1946)
- Red Clark at the showdown (1947)
- Red Clark in Paradise (1947)
- Quarter Horse (1948)
- Red Clark to the rescue (1948)
- Wanted-Dead Or Alive! (1949)
- Fast on the Draw (1950)
- Hell on Hoofs (1952) (with The Brazos Firebrand by Leslie Scott)

Gordon Young writing as "Paull Steward" :

- Dangerous Men (1926)
- Gaboreau (1927)
- Garoreau the Terrible (1927)
