= Hardboiled =

Literary genre

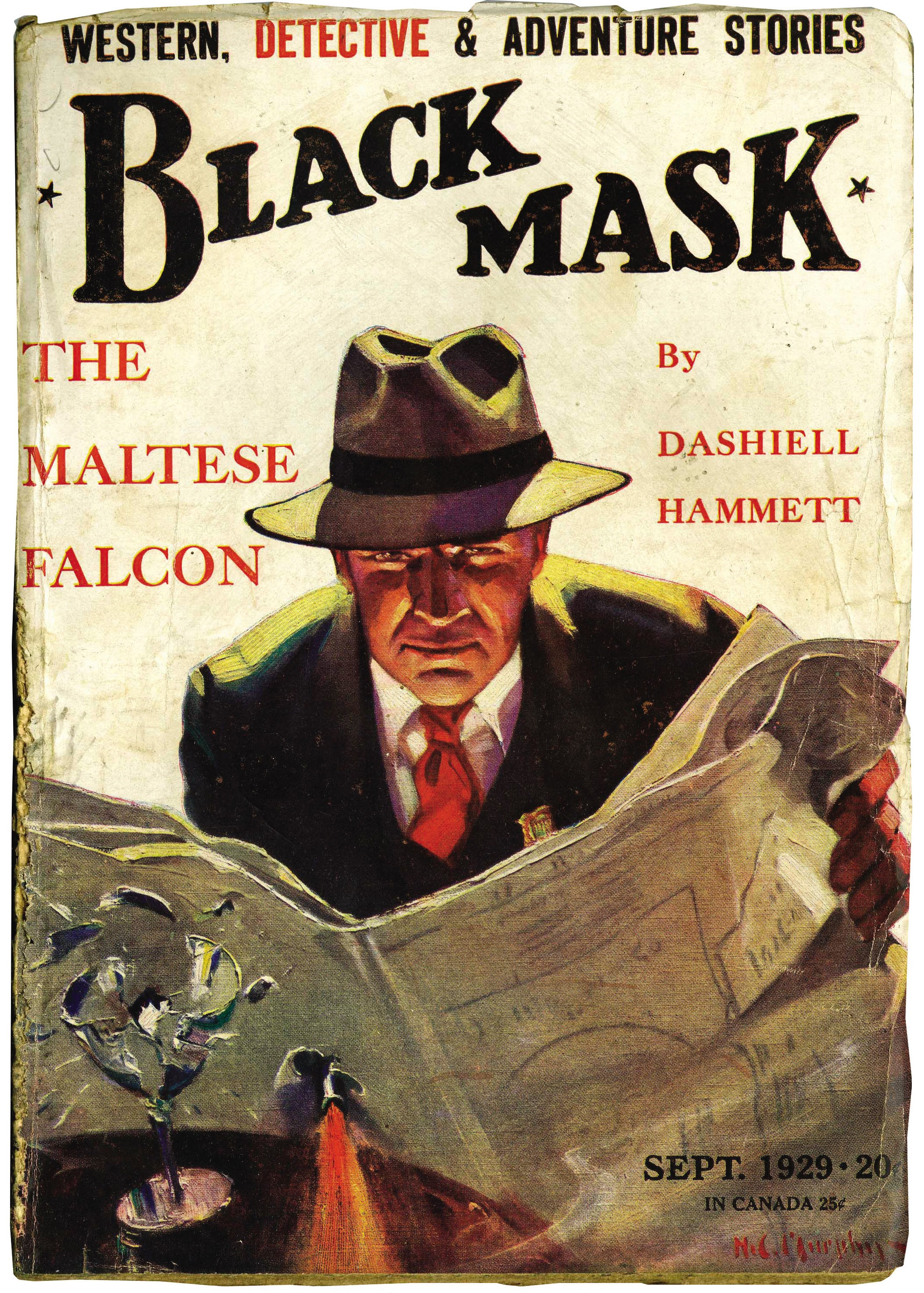
The cover of seminal hardboiled magazine Black Mask, September 1929, featuring part 1 of its serialization of The Maltese Falcon, by Dashiell Hammett. Illustration of private eye Sam Spade by Henry C. Murphy Jr.

Hardboiled fiction is a genre of crime fiction and detective fiction, similar in tone or mood to noir fiction, whose typical protagonist is a justice-seeking detective battling the violence of organized crime, while dealing with a legal system that has become as corrupt as the organized crime itself. Hardboiled works are largely set during Prohibition in the United States (1920–1933) or its aftermath, during a historical uptick in American organized crime. Rendered cynical by the cycle of violence, the detectives of hardboiled fiction are often antiheroes. Notable hardboiled detectives include Dick Tracy, Philip Marlowe, Nick Charles, Mike Hammer, Sam Spade, Lew Archer, Slam Bradley, Dan Turner, and the Continental Op.

== Genre pioneers ==
The style was pioneered by Carroll John Daly in the mid-1920s, popularized by Dashiell Hammett over the course of the decade, and refined by James M. Cain and by Raymond Chandler beginning in the late 1930s. English writer Gerald Butler was referred to as the "English James M. Cain", and his characters were noted as hardboiled. Its heyday was in 1930s–50s America.

== History ==
From its earliest days, hardboiled fiction was published in and closely associated with so-called pulp magazines. Pulp historian Robert Sampson argues that Gordon Young's "Don Everhard" stories (which appeared in Adventure magazine from 1917 onwards) about an "extremely tough, unsentimental, and lethal" gun-toting urban gambler, anticipated the hardboiled detective stories. In its earliest uses in the late 1920s, "hardboiled" did not refer to a type of crime fiction; it meant the tough (cynical) attitude towards emotions triggered by violence.

The hardboiled crime story became a staple of several pulp magazines in the 1930s; most famously Black Mask under the editorship of Joseph T. Shaw, but also in other pulps such as Dime Detective and Detective Fiction Weekly. Consequently, "pulp fiction" is often used as a synonym for hardboiled crime fiction or gangster fiction; some would distinguish within it the private-eye story from the crime novel itself.

In the United States, the original hardboiled style has been emulated by innumerable writers, including James Ellroy, Paul Cain, Sue Grafton, Chester Himes, Paul Levine, John D. MacDonald, Ross Macdonald, Walter Mosley, Sara Paretsky, Robert B. Parker, and Mickey Spillane. Later, many hardboiled novels were published by houses specializing in paperback originals, most notably Gold Medal, and in later decades republished by houses such as Black Lizard.

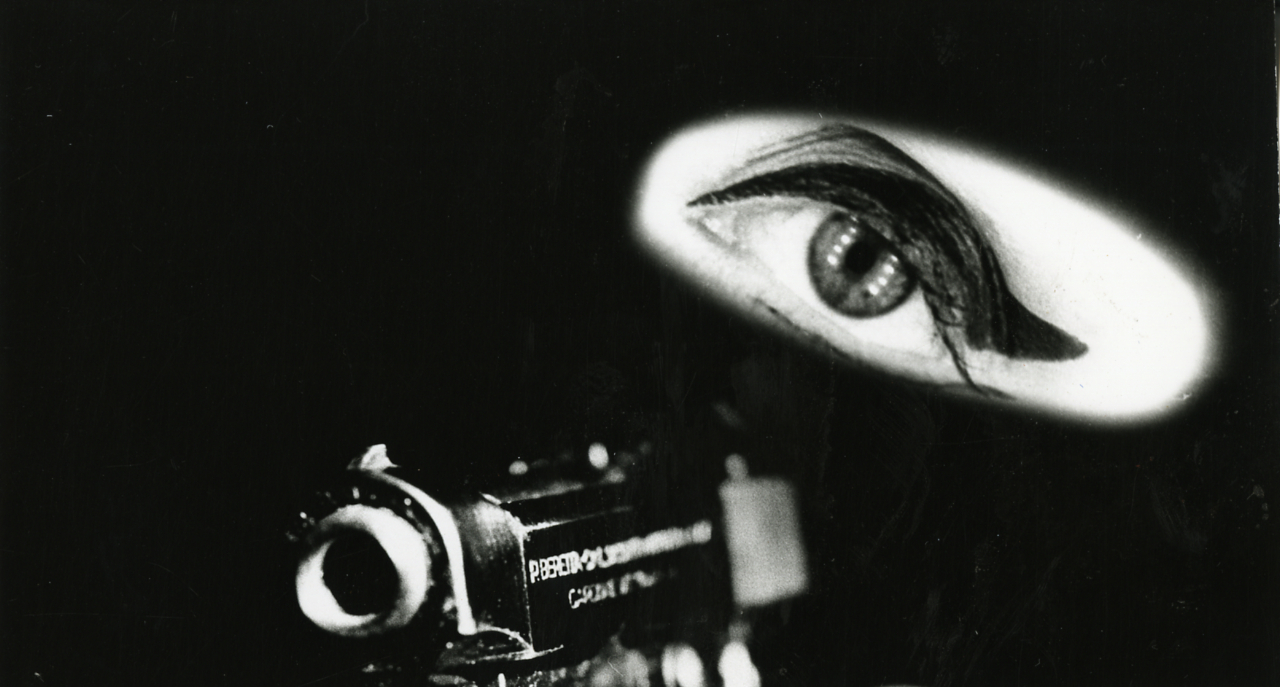
Photo by Paolo Monti, 1975

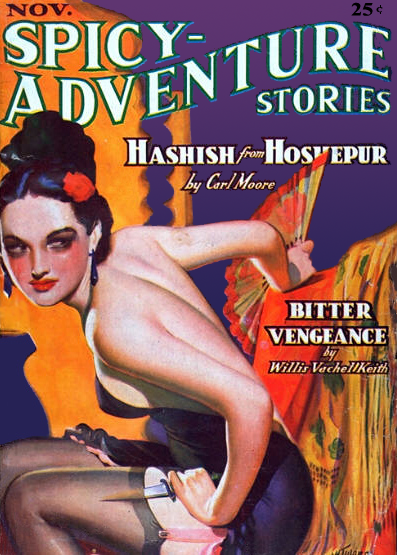
Femmes fatales were standard fare in hardboiled fiction.

== Relation to noir fiction ==
Hardboiled writing is also associated with "noir fiction". Eddie Duggan discusses the similarities and differences between the two related forms in his 1999 article on pulp writer Cornell Woolrich. In his full-length study of David Goodis, Jay Gertzman notes: "The best definition of hard boiled I know is that of critic Eddie Duggan. In noir, the primary focus is interior: psychic imbalance leading to self-hatred, aggression, sociopathy, or a compulsion to control those with whom one shares experiences. By contrast, hard boiled 'paints a backdrop of institutionalized social corruption'".

== Resurgence ==
Since the 1980s, the stock character of the hardboiled detective has undergone a revival due in part to the popularity of Neo-noir movies like Chinatown, Dead Men Don't Wear Plaid, Dirty Harry, Nighthawks, and L.A. Confidential. Eddie Valiant from Who Framed Roger Rabbit, Ace Hart from Dog City, Sam & Max, Nick Valentine from Fallout 4, and Velda Girl Detective all embody and sometimes parody the trope.

== See also ==
- Femme fatale
- Noir fiction (Film noir)
- Guy Noir
- Mystery film
- Naturalism (literature)
- Damon Runyon
