= Nick Eggenhofer =

American painter

Nicholas Eggenhofer
- Born: December 5, 1897; Gauting, Bavaria, Germany
- Died: March 7, 1985 (aged 87); Cody, Wyoming, U.S.
- Education: Cooper Union
- Occupations: Painter, illustrator, sculptor
- Spouse: Louise Strube
- Children: 1 daughter

Nick Eggenhofer (December 5, 1897 - March 7, 1985) was a German-born American painter, illustrator and sculptor of the American West. He was the author of two books.

== Early life ==
Eggenhofer was born in Gauting, Bavaria, on December 5, 1897. He emigrated to the United States in 1913. He graduated from Cooper Union in New York City.

== Career ==
Eggenhofer was an illustrator of pulp magazines like Western Story Magazine from 1920 to 1950. He also illustrated over 50 Western-themed books. He became known as "the dean of Western illustrators."

Eggenhofer became a painter in the late 1950s, and he moved his studio to Cody, Wyoming in 1961. He painted and sculpted the American West, including horses, mules, cowboys and Native Americans. He exhibited his work at the Buffalo Bill Center of the West in Cody, Wyoming in 1975 and 1981, and at the Museum of Western Art in Kerrville, Texas in January 1985. He was a member of the Cowboy Artists of America from 1970 to 1974, and he won the Trustees Gold Medal from the National Cowboy & Western Heritage Museum in Oklahoma City, Oklahoma in 1973.

Eggenhofer authored two books, including an autobiography.

== Personal life and death ==
Eggenhofer married Louise Strube in 1924. They had a daughter, Evelyn. Eggenhofer was a Freemason.

Eggenhofer died on March 7, 1985, in Cody, Wyoming, at age 87.

== Selected works ==
- Eggenhofer, Nick (1961). Wagons, Mules, and Men: How the Frontier Moved West. Hastings House. OCLC 733700515.
- Eggenhofer, Nick (1981). Horses, Horses, Always Horses: The Life and Art of Nick Eggenhofer. Cody, Wyoming: Sage Pub. Co. OCLC 881699300.
