= Black Mask (magazine) =

Pulp magazine

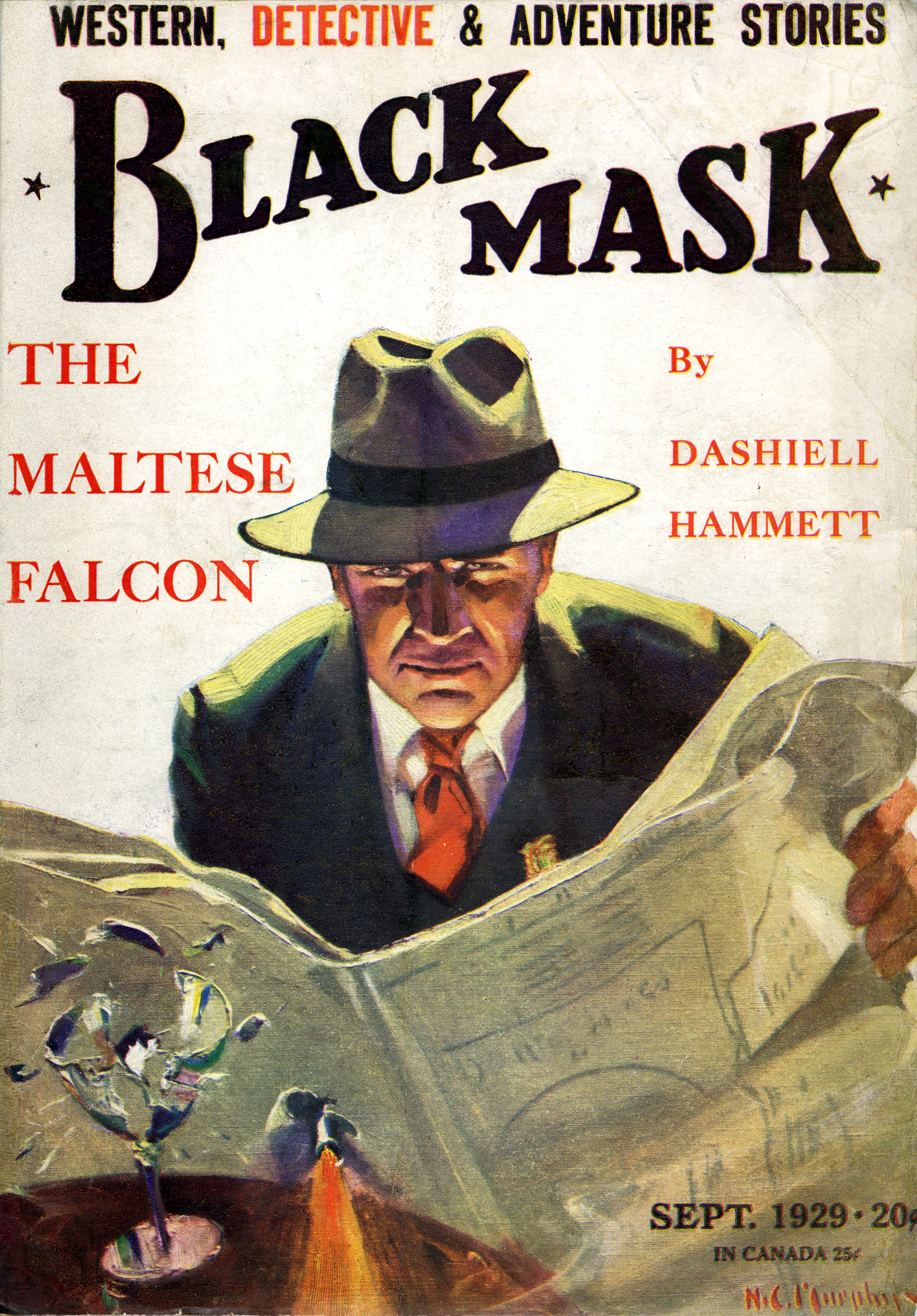
- September 1929 cover of Black Mask, featuring part 1 of serialization of The Maltese Falcon, by Dashiell Hammett
- Editor: H. L. Mencken and George Jean Nathan; Philip C. Cody (1924–1926) later Joseph Shaw, and Fanny Ellsworth (1936–1940)
- Categories: Hardboiled
- Frequency: Started monthly, then twice a month after August 1922, then monthly in 1926
- Publisher: Pro-Distributors Publishing Company, 1920–40; Popular Publications 1940–51
- Founded: 1920
- First issue: April 1920
- Final issue: 1951
- Country: United States
- Language: English
- Website: blackmaskmagazine.com

Black Mask was a pulp magazine first published in April 1920 by the journalist H. L. Mencken and the drama critic George Jean Nathan. It is most well-known today for launching the hardboiled crime subgenre of mystery fiction, publishing now-classic works by Dashiell Hammett, Raymond Chandler, Erle Stanley Gardner, Cornell Woolrich, Paul Cain, Carroll John Daly, and others.

== Early years, 1920–26 ==
The magazine was one of several money-making publishing ventures to support the prestigious literary magazine The Smart Set, which Mencken edited, and which had operated at a loss since at least 1917. Under their editorial hand, the magazine was not exclusively a publisher of crime fiction, offering, according to the magazine, "the best stories available of adventure, the best mystery and detective stories, the best romances, the best love stories, and the best stories of the occult." The magazine's first editor was Florence Osborne (credited as F. M. Osborne).

After eight issues, Mencken and Nathan considered their initial $600 investment to have been sufficiently profitable, and they sold the magazine to its publishers, Eltinge Warner and Eugene Crow, for $12,500. The magazine was then edited by George W. Sutton (1922–24), followed by Philip C. Cody. Cody had significant interests and expertise in the publishing world serving as Vice President of Warner Publications publishers of such mass market magazines as Field and Stream, and pulp genre publications such as Black Mask. Under Cody's editorship, the content of Black Mask became more sensationalist. Cody, who had a keen sense for what appealed to the public marketplace, focused on what had the most reader allure. Under Cody, the stories chosen for publication were longer, more intricately plotted and strewn with more blood, guts, gore and sex. Cody served as both circulation editor and general editor from 1924 to 1926. In 1926, Joseph Shaw took over the editorship.

== Contributing authors ==
Early Black Mask contributors of note included J. S. Fletcher, Vincent Starrett, and Herman Petersen. Shaw, following up on a promising lead from one of the early issues, promptly turned the magazine into an outlet for the growing school of naturalistic crime writers led by Carroll John Daly. Daly's private detective Race Williams was a rough-and-ready character with a sharp tongue, establishing a model for many later acerbic private eyes.

Black Mask later published stories by the profoundly influential Dashiell Hammett, creator of Sam Spade and The Continental Op, and other hardboiled writers who came in his wake, such as Raymond Chandler, Erle Stanley Gardner, Paul Cain, Frederick Nebel, Frederick C. Davis, Raoul F. Whitfield, Theodore Tinsley, Todhunter Ballard (as W.T. Ballard), Dwight V. Babcock, and Roger Torrey. The best-known contributors to Black Mask were mostly men, but the magazine also published works by many female crime writers, including Marjory Stoneman Douglas, Katherine Brocklebank, Sally Dixon Wright, Florence M. Pettee, Marion O'Hearn, Kay Krausse, Frances Beck, Tiah Devitt and Dorothy Dunn. Crime fiction made up most of the magazine's content, but Black Mask also published some Western and general adventure fiction.

The magazine was successful, and many of the writers whose work appeared in its pages, such as Hugh B. Cave, went on to greater commercial and critical success. Writer George Harmon Coxe created "Casey, Crime Photographer", for the magazine; the character became a media franchise, appearing in novels, films, radio and television programs, comic books, and theatrical productions.

Black Mask's covers were usually painted by Fred Craft or J. W. Schlaikjer. Shaw gave Arthur Rodman Bowker a monopoly on creating illustrations for the interior of the magazine.

== Decline and revival ==
Black Mask reached a sales peak in the early 1930s, but then interest began to wane under increasing pressure from radio, the cinema, and rival pulp magazines. In 1936, refusing to cut writers' already meager pay, Shaw resigned, and many of the high-profile authors abandoned the magazine with him. Shaw's successor, Fanny Ellsworth (1936–40), managed to attract new writers to Black Mask, including Cornell Woolrich, Frank Gruber, Max Brand and Steve Fisher. However, from the 1940s on, Black Mask was in decline, despite the efforts of a new editor, Kenneth S. White (1940–48). The magazine in this period carried the work of John D. MacDonald. Henry Steeger then edited Black Mask anonymously until it ceased publication in 1951. In 1953, Ellery Queen Mystery Magazine bought Black Mask Magazine, and turned it into a special department which “features harder-edged works of crime, noir, and private-eye writers.” Black Mask ceased to exist in EQMM in the 1970s but was reinstated in 2008 and continues to run today.

In 1985, the magazine was revived as The New Black Mask, featuring noted crime writers James Ellroy, Michael Collins, Sara Paretsky and Bill Pronzini, as well as Chandler and Hammett reprints. Edward D. Hoch praised the revived Black Mask, stating in the book Encyclopedia Mysteriosa that "it came close to reviving the excitement and storytelling pleasure of the great old pulp magazines". As a result of a legal dispute over the rights to the name Black Mask, the magazine ceased publication in 1987. It was revived as a short-lived magazine entitled A Matter of Crime.

Original copies of the Black Mask are highly valued among pulp magazine collectors. Issues with stories by Chandler and Hammett are especially coveted and command high prices.

In 2016, the magazine, including its copyrights and intellectual property, were acquired by Steeger Properties, LLC. It was relaunched by Altus Press.

Select covers from Black Mask were featured as collectable items in the 2020 action-adventure video game Mafia: Definitive Edition.

== Anthologies ==
- Shaw, Joseph T., ed. (1946). The Hard-Boiled Omnibus: Early Stories from Black Mask. Simon and Schuster.
- Ruhm, Herbert, ed. (1977). The Hard-Boiled Detective: Stories from Black Mask magazine, 1920–1951. Vintage Books. ISBN 9780394721569.
- Nolan, William F., ed. (1985). The Black Mask Boys: Masters in the Hard-Boiled School of Detective Fiction. W. Morrow. ISBN 9780688039660. Includes a short history of the magazine.
- Penzler, Otto, ed. (2007). The Black Lizard Big Book of Black Mask Stories.

== Cover gallery ==
August 1920

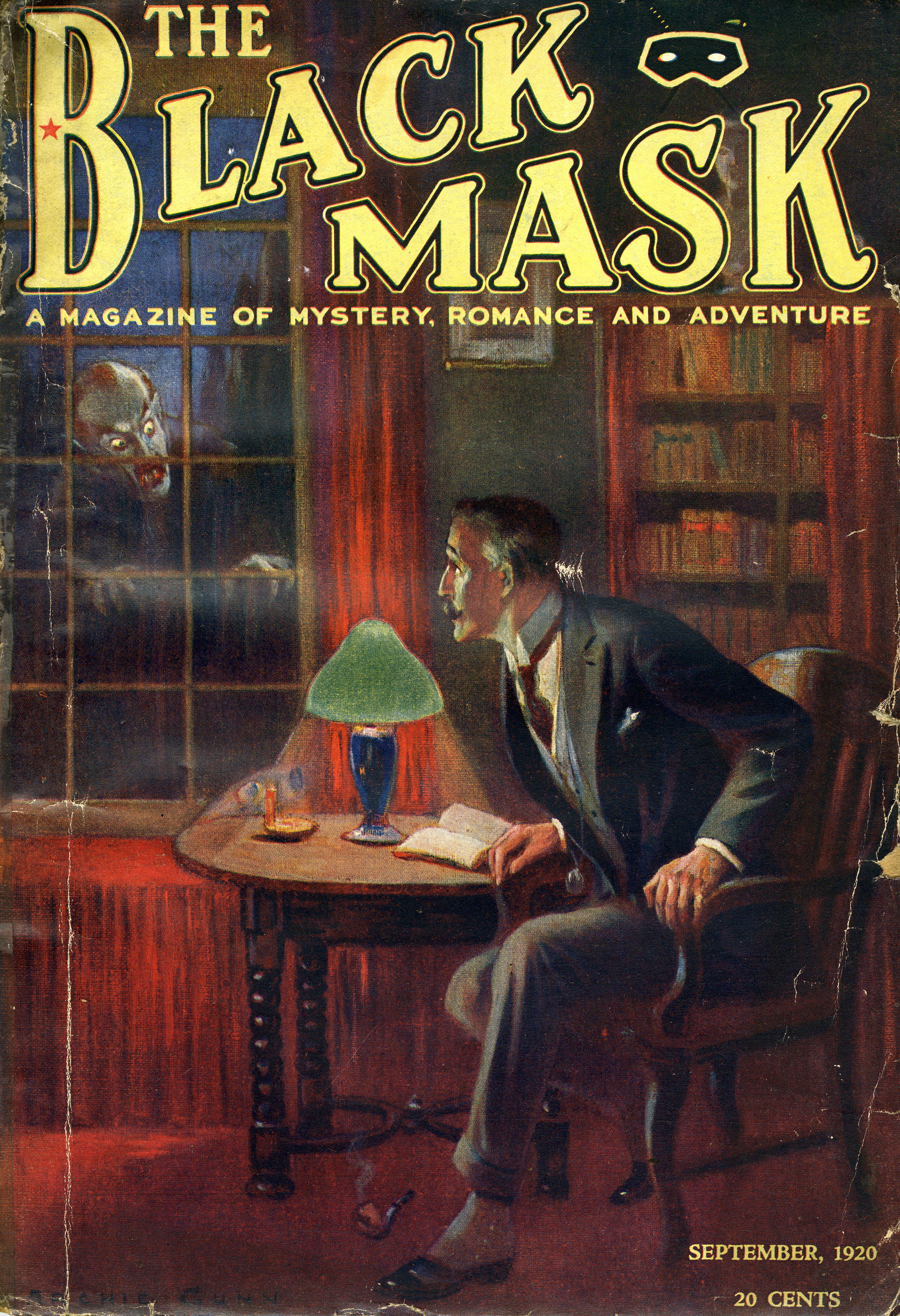
September 1920

November 1920

December 1921

April 1922

August 1922

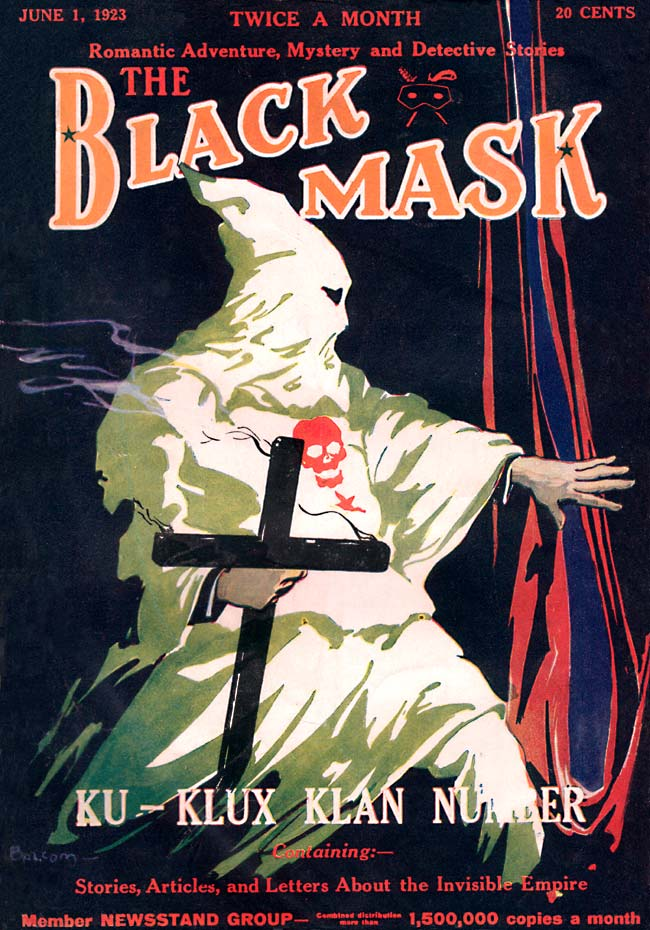
June 1923, featuring Carroll John Daly's anti-Ku Klux Klan story "Knights of the Open Palm"

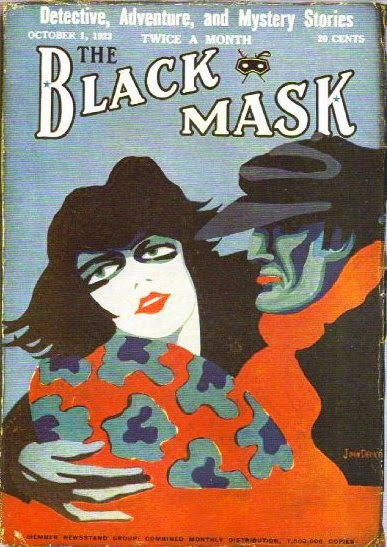
October 1923

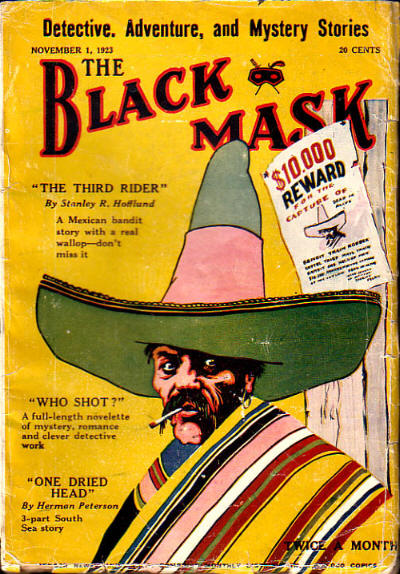
November 1923

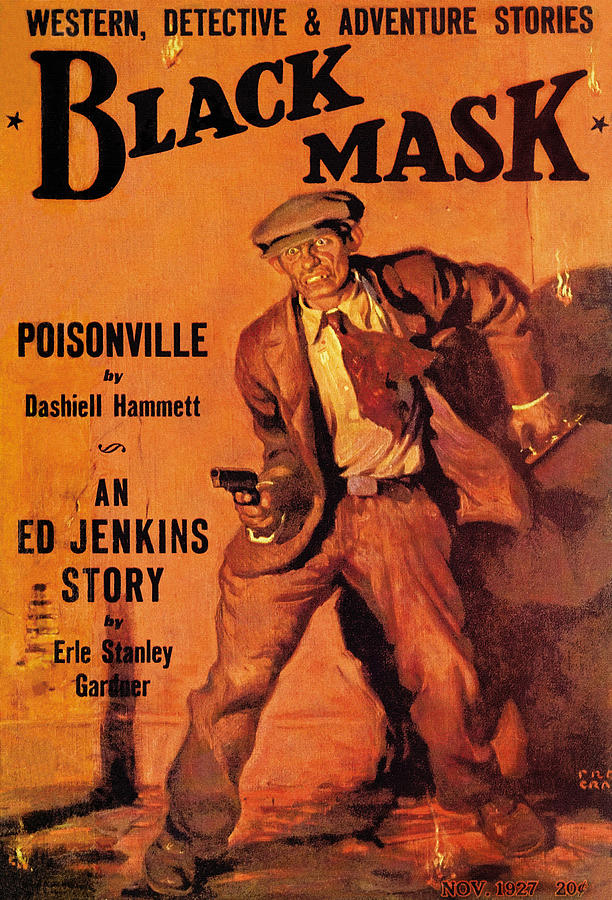
November 1927, featuring Dashiell Hammett's "The Cleansing of Poisonville"
