= Carroll John Daly =

American writer

- Born: September 14, 1889; Yonkers, New York
- Died: January 16, 1958 (aged 68); Los Angeles, California
- Occupation: Author
- Writing career
- Genre: Hardboiled crime fiction
- Notable work: The Race Williams stories

Carroll John Daly (1889–1958) was a writer of crime fiction. One of the earliest writers of hard-boiled fiction, he is best known for his detective character Race Williams, who appeared in a number of stories for Black Mask magazine in the 1920s.

== Early life ==
Daly was born on September 14, 1889, in Yonkers, New York. He attended the American Academy of Dramatic Arts in New York City. Before turning to writing, he was an usher, projectionist, and an actor, and opened the first movie theater in Atlantic City, New Jersey. Unlike Hammett, who had actually worked as a Pinkerton detective before writing about similar if exaggerated fictional detectives, Daly was anything but a hardboiled antihero in real life. He was 33 years old before his first crime story was published, and up to that point lived quietly in the suburb of White Plains, New York. As Lee Server, author of the Encyclopedia of Pulp Fiction Writers, put it: "He was afraid of cold weather and dentists. His violent, tough-talking detective stories were a fantasy outlet for the mild-mannered man."

== Career ==
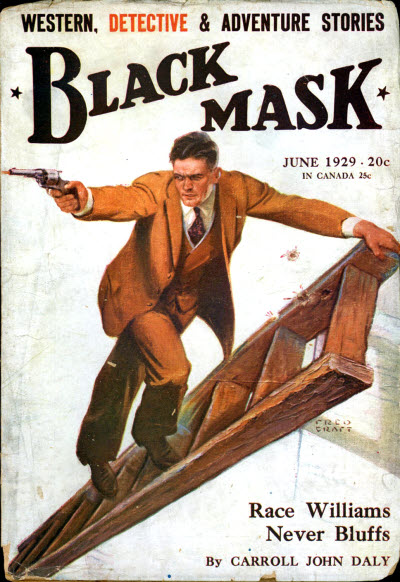
Cover of June 1929 issue of Black Mask featuring Race Williams

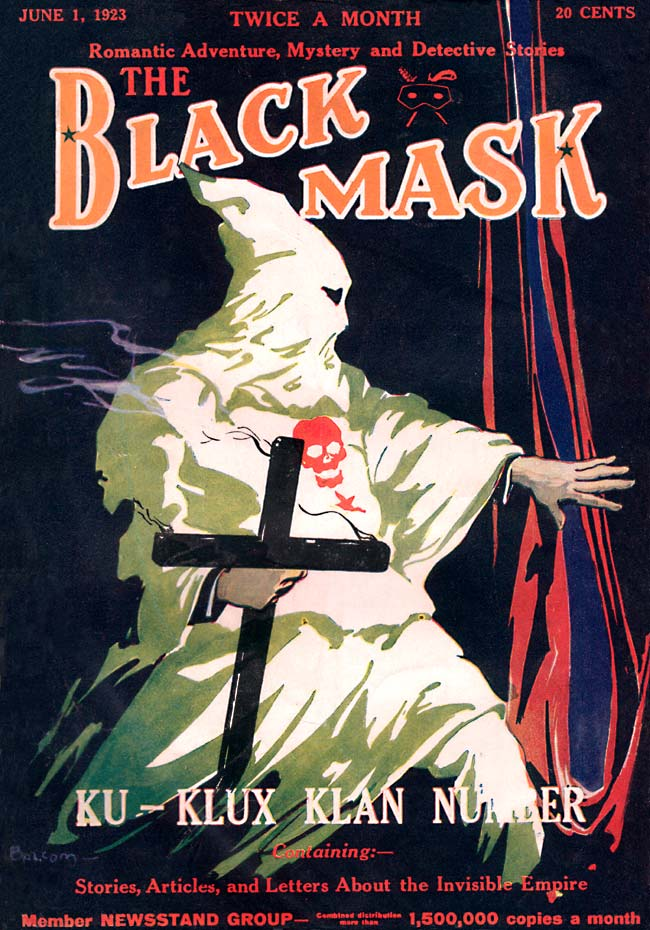
Cover of June 1923 issue of Black Mask featuring Daly's anti-Ku Klux Klan story "Knights of the Open Palm".

Daly is generally considered vital to the history of the hardboiled crime genre, less for the quality of his writing than the fact that he was the first writer to combine all the elements of the style and form that we now recognize as the dark, violent hardboiled story. Enormously popular in his time, Carroll's no-nonsense tough-guy detective stories have gone on to influence not only contemporaries such as Dashiell Hammett, but Mickey Spillane and dozens of other writers. Daly's popularity was so high that his name appearing on the cover of a magazine was enough to boost sales by 15 percent. A Black Mask readers' poll once showed Daly as the most popular writer in the magazine, ahead of Hammett and Erle Stanley Gardner. Today, his writing is often considered "something between quaint and camp", in the words of genre historian William L. DeAndrea. Lee Server has noted, however, that comparing Daly with his better-remembered successors may be unfair, and that Daly's most crucial influence on the genre was his rejection of what was mainstream detective fiction during Daly's own time—instead of the mannered, aristocratic sleuths of drawing-room mysteries, Daly was influenced by the avenging vigilantes of Westerns and stories of the American frontier, such as Wyatt Earp and James Fenimore Cooper's Natty Bumppo, who were more likely to solve a case with their fists than a magnifying glass.

Daly has been credited with creating the first hard-boiled story, "The False Burton Combs", published in Black Mask magazine in December 1922, followed closely by "It's All in the Game" (Black Mask, April 1923) and the PI story "Three Gun Terry" (Black Mask, May 1923). DeAndrea has noted that Daly's stories were less concerned with updating Victorian-era drawing room mysteries than Wild West stories, and that his tough, urban heroes were most similar to the gunslingers of Westerns than detectives or sleuths of earlier works, calling them "two-gun kids riding an urban range, delivering death and justice via the same hot lead route as the gunfighters of dime novels". By virtue of being first (along with Hammett), Daly set the rules of the hardboiled genre that would be adhered to, or broken, by future writers.

=== Race Williams ===
The whole text of "Knights of the Open Palm"

Daly's private detective Race Williams was his most successful creation, appearing in about 70 stories and eight novels. Lee Server has called the character "the single most popular private eye in the history of the pulps." Although Black Mask editor Joseph Shaw did not like the Race Williams stories, they were so popular with readers that he asked Daly to continue writing them. Thus, Race Williams became the first hardboiled detective to have his own series.

He first appeared in "Knights of the Open Palm", an anti-Ku Klux Klan story. "Knights of the Open Palm" was published June 1, 1923, in Black Mask, predating the October 1923 debut of Dashiell Hammett's Continental Op character.

Daly's Williams was a rough-and-ready character with a sharp tongue and established the model for many later acerbic private eyes. Race Williams' hards-as-nails, unsubtle characterization was in many ways a model for the taciturn, violent and hypermasculine hardboiled private eye. DeAndrea called Williams "a tough, cocky, nearly mindless investigator who shot his way through his cases." Williams exemplified the hardboiled P.I., from his generally antagonistic relationship with the police, to his (largely) aloof, even Victorian attitude toward women, to his disinterest in financial reward as much as the thrill of the hunt.

=== Other work ===
Daly also created other pulp detectives, including Detective Satan Hall, "Three-Gun Terry" Mack, and Vee Brown. In addition to Black Mask, Daly also wrote for other pulp magazines, including Detective Fiction Weekly and Dime Detective. After leaving Black Mask, Daly found other magazines did not want serials. Daly's solution was the "story arc", stand alone stories that did not depend on each other, yet tied together to make a larger theme/plot.

His other characters included Clay Holt, a detective almost identical to Race Williams, created by Daly when he left Black Mask; all of the Holt stories were published by Dime Detective instead. One of the Holt stories, "Ticket to a Crime", has the distinction of being Daly's only story to be adapted into a Hollywood movie, the 1934 Lewis D. Collins film Ticket to a Crime.

In the 1940s, Daly's work fell out of fashion with crime fiction readers, and he moved to California to work on comics and film scripts. When Mickey Spillane became a bestselling novelist with Mike Hammer, a character similar to Daly's detectives, Daly remarked "I'm broke, and this guy gets rich writing about my detective." However, Spillane wrote Daly a fan letter saying that Race Williams was the model for his own Mike Hammer. According to Spillane, Daly's agent saw the letter and instituted a plagiarism suit, whereupon Daly fired her because he had not received a fan letter in years and did not want to sue anybody who had taken the time to write one.

Daly's papers are archived in the Department of Special Collections at the UCLA Library.

== Death ==
Daly died on January 16, 1958, in Los Angeles, California.

== Novels ==
- The White Circle (1926)
- The Snarl of the Beast (1927)
- Man in the Shadows (1928)
- The Hidden Hand (1929)
- The Tag Murders (1930)
- Tainted Power (1931)
- The Third Murderer (1931)
- The Amateur Murderer (1933)
- Murder Won’t Wait (1933)
- Murder from the East (1935)
- Mr. Strang (1936)
- The Mystery of the Smoking Gun (1936)
- The Emperor of Evil (1937)
- Better Corpses (1940)
- Murder at Our House (1950)
- Ready to Burn (1951)

== Precursor to Race Williams ==
- "The False Burton Combs", Black Mask, December 1922, in Herbert Ruhm (1977), ed., The Hard-boiled Detective: Stories from "Black Mask" Magazine (1920-1951), New York: Vintage.

== Race Williams stories ==
All published in Black Mask magazine, through "The Eyes Have It" (Nov 1934) The Altus Press aka Steeger Books has re-published all the Black Mask stories in a six-volume set.

- Knights of the Open Palm (June 1923) Race vs. The KKK. Appeared in special KKK number of Black Mask Vol. 6 No. 5 June 1, 1923
- Three Thousand to the Good (July 1923)
- The Red Peril (June 1924)
- Them That Lives by Their Guns (August 1924)
- Devil Cat (November 1924)
- The Face Behind the Mask (February 1925)
- Conceited, Maybe (April 1925)
- Say It with Lead (June 1925)
- I'll Tell the World (August 1925)
- Alias, Buttercup (October 1925)
- Under Cover [parts:1-2] (December 1925 - January 1926) (serialized novel)
- South Sea Steel (May 1926)
- The False Clara Burkhart (July 1926)
- The Super Devil (August 1926)
- Half-Breed (November 1926)
- Blind Alleys (April 1927)
- The Snarl of the Beast [parts: 1-4] (June, July, August, September 1927) [serialized novel, book - 1927]
- The Egyptian Lure (March 1928)
- The Hidden Hand [Creeping Death] (June-Oct 1928) [serialized novel, book - 1929]
- Tags of Death (March–June 1929); [aka: The Tag Murders book - 1930] Race Williams (& Flame)
- The Silver Eagle (October- November 1929); [*? title of 2nd part: "The Death Trap" (November 1929). Serial dropped after Part 2] Race Williams (& Flame)
- Tainted Power (June–August 1930); [aka: Tainted Power, book - 1931] Race Williams (& Flame)
- Shooting Out of Turn (October 1930)
- Murder by Mail (March 1931)
- The Flame and Race Williams [parts:1-3] (June, July, August 1931) [aka: The Third Murderer, book - 1931] Race Williams (& Flame)
- Death for Two (September 1931)
- The Amateur Murderer [parts:1-4] (April, May, June, July 1932) [book - 1933]
- Merger with Death (December 1932)
- The Death Drop (May 1933)
- If Death Is Respectable (July 1933)
- Murder in the Open (October 1933)
- Six Have Died (May 1934)
- Flaming Death (June 1934)
- Murder Book (August 1934) [aka: Murder from the East, book - 1935] Race Williams (& Flame)
- The Eyes Have It (November 1934) (last Black Mask story)
- Some Die Hard (Dime Detective, September 1935)
- Dead Hands Reaching (Dime Detective, November 1935)(start of the “Morse” story arc)
- Corpse & Co. (Dime Detective, February 1936)
- Just Another Stiff (Dime Detective, April 1936)(end of the “Morse” story arc)
- City of Blood (Dime Detective, October 1936) [The five stories above were collected in ‘The Adventures of Race Williams’]
- The Morgue's Our Home (Dime Detective, December 1936)
- Monogram in Lead (Dime Detective, February 1937) Available from

http://davycrockettsalmanack.blogspot.com/2013/01/forgotten-and-free-stories-race.html

- Dead Men Don't Kill (Dime Detective, August 1937)
- Anyone's Corpse! (Dime Detective, October 1937) Available from

http://davycrockettsalmanack.blogspot.com/search/label/Race%20Williams%20stories

- The $1,000,000 Corpse (Dime Detective, December 1937) Race Williams-?* (+ see [different-?*]: March 1950)
- The Book of the Dead (Dime Detective, January 1938)
- A Corpse on the House (Dime Detective, March 1938)
- A Corpse for a Corpse (Dime Detective, July 1938) Available from

http://davycrockettsalmanack.blogspot.com/search/label/Race%20Williams%20stories

- The Men in Black (Dime Detective, October 1938) Available from vintagelibrary.com
- The Quick and the Dead (Dime Detective, December 1938)
- Hell with the Lid Lifted (March 1939) Race Williams (& Flame) Available from

http://davycrockettsalmanack.blogspot.com/search/label/Race%20Williams%20stories

- A Corpse in the Hand (Dime Detective, June 1939) Available from

http://davycrockettsalmanack.blogspot.com/search/label/Race%20Williams%20stories

- Gangman's Gallows (Dime Detective, August 1939)
- The White-Headed Corpse (Dime Detective, November 1939) Available from vintagelibrary.com
- Cash for a Killer (Detective Tales, February 1940) Race Williams-?*
- Victim for Vengeance (Clues, September 1940) Available at

http://davycrockettsalmanack.blogspot.com/search/label/Race%20Williams%20stories

- Better Corpses (1940) Race Williams (& Flame) UK only. The three stories of the “Morse” story arc:‘Dead Hands Reaching’, ‘Corpse & Co.’, and ‘Just Another Stiff’ from 1935 to 1936. Available from vintagelibrary.com
- Too Dead to Pay (Clues, March 1941) Available at

http://davycrockettsalmanack.blogspot.com/search/label/Race%20Williams%20stories

- Body, Body – Who's Got the Body? (Detective Story Magazine, October 1944) Race Williams-?* Available at

http://davycrockettsalmanack.blogspot.com/search/label/Race%20Williams%20stories

- A Corpse Loses Its Head (Detective Story Magazine, March 1945) Race Williams-?*
- Unremembered Murder (Detective Story Magazine, March 1947) May have been later re-titled ‘Not My Corpse’
- This Corpse on Me (Thrilling Detective, June 1947) included in ‘Race Williams’ Double Date’ story collection
- I'll Feel Better When You're Dead (Thrilling Detective, December 1947) Included in ‘Race Williams’ Double Date’ story collection
- Not My Corpse (Thrilling Detective-UK, June 1948) May have been earlier titled ‘Unremembered Murder’, Available in ‘The Mammoth Book of Private Eye Stories’
- Race Williams' Double Date (Dime Detective, August 1948) included in ‘Race Williams’ Double Date’ story collection
- The Wrong Corpse (Thrilling Detective, February 1949) Available from

http://davycrockettsalmanack.blogspot.com/search/label/Race%20Williams%20stories

- Half a Corpse (Dime Detective, May 1949)
- Race Williams Cooks a Goose (Dime Detective, October 1949)
- The $100,000 Corpse (Popular Detective, March 1950) (see [different-?*]: December 1937)
- The Strange Case of Alta May (Thrilling Detective, April 1950)
- Little Miss Murder (Smashing Detective Stories, June 1952)
- This Corpse Is Free! (Smashing Detective Stories, September 1952) included in ‘Race Williams’ Double Date’ story collection
- Gas (Smashing Detective Stories, June 1953) included in ‘Race Williams’ Double Date’ story collection
- Head over Homicide (Smashing Detective Stories, May 1955) [wrong title (misspelling): Head over Heels]

== Other resources ==
Daly, Carroll John (1947). "The Ambulating Lady" [essay on his writing style]. Writer's Digest April 1947. Repr. Clues: A Journal of Detection 2.2 (1981): 113–15.
