= Joseph Shaw (editor) =

American novelist and editor

- Born: Joseph Thompson Shaw; May 8, 1874; Gorham, Maine, U.S.
- Died: August 2, 1952 (aged 78); New York City, U.S.
- Education: Bowdoin College
- Occupations: Editor; author; literary agent
- Known for: Editor of Black Mask magazine, 1926–36

Joseph Thompson "Cap" Shaw (May 8, 1874 – August 2, 1952) was the editor of Black Mask magazine from 1926 to 1936.

== Life and career ==
Before becoming the editor of Black Mask, Shaw had worked as a newspaper reporter and as a soldier in World War I, attaining the rank of captain (Shaw's friends gave him the nickname "Cap"). Shaw was also a professional fencer, and even won an Olympic medal for fencing. Under his editorship, Black Mask published many works of crime fiction now recognised as classics of the genre, by authors such as Dashiell Hammett, Raymond Chandler, and Erle Stanley Gardner. Chandler greatly admired Shaw's ability to encourage Black Mask writers, claiming in a letter, "We wrote better for him than we could have written for anybody else."

Despite the critical and commercial success of Black Mask, Shaw was eventually fired from the magazine, succeeded by Fanny Ellsworth. Shaw then worked as a literary agent, though without notable success.

Shaw was a writer himself, producing short stories, novels, and articles.

== Works ==
=== Novels ===
- Derelict (New York: Alfred A. Knopf, 1930)
- Blood on the Curb (Steeger Books, 2020)
- It Happened at the Lake (Steeger Books, 2022)

=== Short stories ===
- "Alkali Ethics," The Scrap Book, May 1911 [first known publication]
- "Close Shootin’," Pioneer Tales, July 1928

=== Articles ===
- "Do You Want to Become a Writer? or Do You Want to Make Money?," Writer's Digest, May 1934.
- "Dialogue," Writer's Digest, June 1939.

=== Editor ===
- The Hard Boiled Omnibus: Early Stories from Black Mask (includes introduction) (New York: Simon and Schuster, 1946)
