= Adventurers' Club of New York =

Adventure-oriented private men's club

The Adventurers' Club of New York was an adventure-oriented private men's club founded in New York City in 1912 by Arthur Sullivant Hoffman, editor of the popular pulp magazine Adventure. There were 34 members at the first meeting. In its second year, "Sinclair Lewis, Hoffman's assistant, was elected secretary and served three years." Monthly dinner meetings, and weekly luncheons, were the primary functions of the club.

According to club secretary, and newspaperman Fred J. Splitstone, the club's "One inviolate rule is that no publicity is ever given to the meetings. It makes men freer to talk." It also makes the club difficult to research. However, soon after making those comments, in 1926, the club began publishing a monthly newsletter, The Adventurer. It ran at least until 1960. Its content primarily concerned club business, e.g., leadership changes and new members. It occasionally ran profiles—and obituaries—of members. The main content was typically a description of the previous monthly dinner meeting. The speakers were described, along with a summation of their speeches.

A weekly CBS radio show, Gold Seal Associates, featuring members of the club describing the most exciting moment of their lives, was inaugurated on June 13, 1930. Major C. E. Russell was the inaugural speaker.

The club was one of several such clubs in New York. The other clubs were the also now dormant Ends of the Earth Club, which included Mark Twain as a member, and the still exant Explorers Club.

The New York club appears to have faded out in the 1970s, but is survived through its Los Angeles chapter.

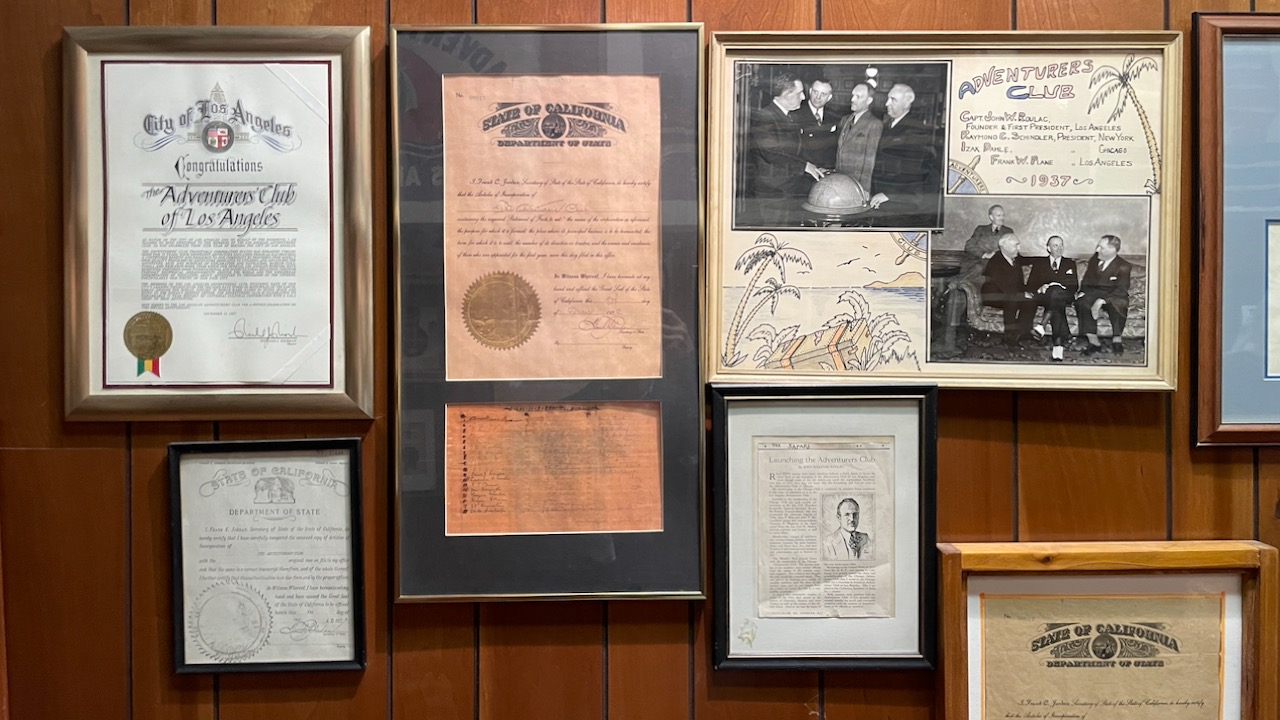
Incorporation papers of the Adventurers Club of Los Angeles and other ephemera

== Chapters ==
Spin-off clubs were founded in Chicago, Los Angeles, Copenhagen, Pretoria, Honolulu, and Singapore. The Adventurers' Club of Los Angeles and the Adventurers' Club of Denmark remain active, The Adventurers' Club of Honolulu was last known to have met in 2023. The Copenhagen chapter was founded in 1938, and the Honolulu chapter was founded in 1954.

=== Los Angeles ===
Founded in 1921 and incorporated in the State of California the following year, The Adventurers' Club of Los Angeles has the distinction of being the only extant chapter in continuous operation for its entire existence. The club has been located in the Lincoln Heights neighborhood east of Los Angeles for the past 30+ years. They were formerly located in the basement of the Masonic Temple on Pico Boulevard at Figueroa just south of Los Angeles for some 20 years prior to that. That Masonic Temple was demolished in 1985 to make way for the Los Angeles Convention Center South Hall expansion.

Like the New York club, it was originally founded as a gentlemen's club, prohibiting female members and resisting calls to admit women until 2024, when declining membership finally necessitated the need to do so.

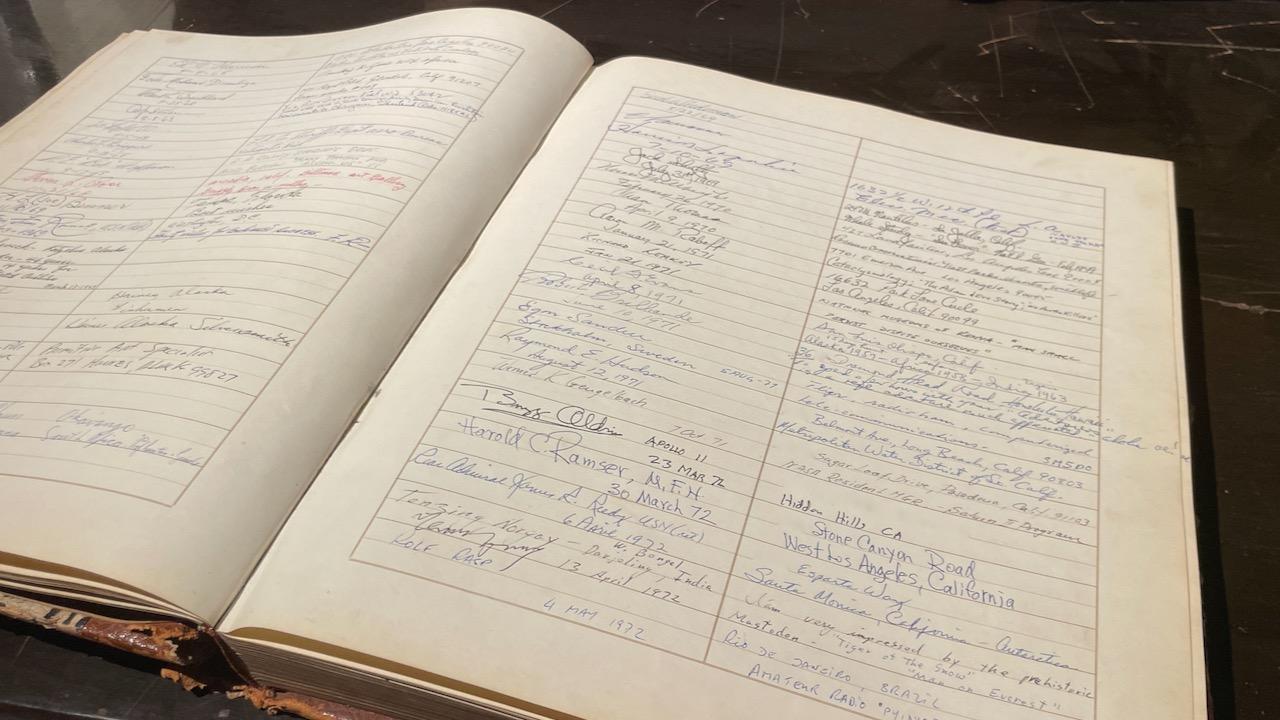
The guestbook of the Los Angeles Adventurers Club showing the entries of Buzz Aldrin and Tenzing Norgay from 1972

The club was started by Jack Roulac, a member of the Chicago chapter who founded the club when he moved to Los Angeles. The membership has included actors and adventurers as varied as Buddy Ebsen, John Anson Ford, Bob Gilliland, John Goddard, Sterling Hayden, Dick Kelty, and Paul MacCready. The club's logo and flag was originally designed by Ginger Lamb, whose husband Dana was also a member. A plaque with the logo was affixed on the Ranger 4 space mission by members who worked at JPL, and remains on the moon to this day. Honorary members and speakers have included Buzz Aldrin, James Cameron, and Tenzing Norgay.

== Members ==
In 1925, the club had 185 total members, of whom 140 were active. The Adventurers' Golden Jubilee (1964) listed 195 active members and 68 associate members, for 263.

Among the members of the Adventurers' Club of New York were many prominent citizens, travelers, writers, artists, and explorers, including the following. Members who attended the first meeting on December 7, 1912, are indicated with "[O]," for original.

- Aage, Count of Rosenborg. Danish prince and officer of the French Foreign Legion.
- Adamson, Hans Christian. Writer: spent 24 days adrift in the Pacific with Eddie Rickenbacker.
- Akeley, Carl. Taxidermist; contributor to natural history museums.
- Aughinbaugh, Dr. William E. A doctor, "a medical hobo," who practiced in perilous places around the globe.
- Bairnsfather, Bruce. British humorist and cartoonist; WWI veteran.
- Barclay, McClelland. Magazine, poster, and advertising artist.
- Baldwin, Captain Tom. [O] Pioneer balloonist.
- Bartlett, Bob. Arctic explorer.
- Bedford-Jones, H. Prolific pulp adventure fiction author.
- Braley, Berton. [O] Prolific poet.
- Bruno, Harry. Early aviation promoter.
- Buck, Frank. Hunter, collector of wild animals, and filmmaker.
- Bullard, Robert Lee. Decorated WWI officer.
- Byrd, Admiral Richard E. USN admiral, polar explorer.
- Calvert, E. H. Spanish–American War veteran (Cuba); silent film actor and director.
- Clark, James Lippitt. Explorer, sculptor and scientist.
- Cotlow, Lewis N. World traveler.
- Couzens, H. D. [O] Adventure author.
- Currie, Barton Wood. Author and book collector.
- Curtis, Leland. Artist and explorer.
- De Brissac, Ricardo. Magazine writer and soldier of fortune.
- de Prorok, Byron. Archaeologist, anthropologist, explorer, and author of travelogues.
- Dingle, Captain A. E. [O] Sea-story author; claimed to be the "very first member … at the very first meeting."
- Dunn, J. Allan. Popular pulp adventure and western fiction author.
- Eddy, Clyde. River explorer.
- Duquesne, Fritz. [O] Boer War veteran; big-game hunter; convicted spy.
- Dwyer, James Francis. [O] Popular pulp writer.
- Eagan, Eddie. Summer and Winter Olympic Games athlete.
- Footner, Hulbert. [O] Canoe explorer; prolific author.
- Foran, W. Robert. British Army officer; co-founder of the NY club; established the Chicago chapter.
- Forman, Harrison. World traveler and author.
- Gallery, Daniel V. USN officer; captured U-boat in WWII.
- Grey, Zane. The popular author of Westerns.
- Hare, Jimmy. Photojournalist and contributor to Collier's.
- Hawks, Frank. Aviator.
- Henshaw, Neville G. Author.
- Hiller, Lejaren. Illustrator and photographer.
- Hinton, Walter. Early aviator.
- Hoffman, Arthur Sullivant. [O] Editor of Adventure; co-founder of the club.
- Hoffman, Harold G. Governor of New Jersey.
- Holt, George E. US consular official in Morocco. Wrote fiction based in India and Morocco.
- Howden Smith, Arthur D. [O] Historian and Adventure author.
- Hyne, C. J. Cutcliffe. Sea-story author.
- Irwin, Will. Author and journalist.
- Jackson, William Henry. Painter, Civil War veteran, geological survey photographer and explorer.
- Kyne, Peter B. Spanish–American War veteran (Philippines); prolific western author.
- Johnson, Martin. Traveler and filmmaker, with wife Osa; cook on Jack London's yacht, the Snark.
- Law, Frederick Houk. Bicycle traveler and pulp writer.
- Lewis, Sinclair. [O] A. S. Hoffman's assistant editor at Adventure; famous novelist.
- Liebe, Hapsburg. Spanish–American War veteran (Philippines); prolific pulp western author; Adventure contributor.
- Lovfal, Per. Electrical engineer; Arctic explorer.
- Lund, Dane. Spanish–American War veteran (Cuba).
- MacCreagh, Gordon. [O] Traveler, Adventure contributor.
- McCloy, John. US Naval officer and twice Congressional Medal of Honor awardee.
- McCurdy, J. A. D. [O] Canadian aviation pioneer.
- Meeker, Ezra. Traveled the Oregon Trail by ox-drawn wagon.
- Mundy, Talbot. [O] Popular adventure-fiction author, prominent in Adventure.
- Pangborn, Clyde. Barnstorming aviator and the first pilot to fly non-stop over the northern Pacific Ocean.
- Pierrot, George F. World traveler; host of World Adventure on Detroit radio and television; editor of The American Boy magazine.
- Pond, James B. "Bim" Archived March 14, 2012, at the Wayback Machine. Traveler and lecturer.
- Reynolds, Stephen Allen. [O] Sailor, whaler, and soldier; first club secretary.
- Ripley, Robert. Cartoonist, famous for Ripley's Believe It or Not!.
- Ritchie, Robert Welles. Journalist, author.
- Roberts, Theodore Goodridge. Author, soldier, and traveler.
- Robertson, George. [O] Automobile racer.
- Russell, Major C. E. Member of the US Intelligence Service and Philippines veteran.
- Schwarzkopf, Norman. Superintendent of the New Jersey State Police.
- Siemel, Sasha. Adventurer, hunter, guide, actor, writer, photographer, and lecturer.
- Steeger, Harry. As head of Popular Publications, published Adventure from July 1934 forward.
- Stephens, Fred. Rocky Mountains trapper and guide.
- Stoloff, Victor. Filmmaker.
- Terhune, Albert Payson. Popular fiction author famous for the novel Lad, a Dog.
- Thomas, Lowell. Popular journalist and travel writer; brought Lawrence of Arabia to fame.
- Trefflich, Henry. Animal importer and dealer.
- von Hoffman, Carl. Soldier, adventurer, author, and photographer of German ancestry.
- Wallace, Frederick William. Journalist; Adventure contributor.
- Walsh, Henry Collins. [O] First president of the club (1912–17).
- Wells, Carveth. World traveler and lecturer.
- Wells, Linton. Foreign correspondent, world traveler, and pioneer broadcaster.
- Wilkins, Sir Hubert. Australian polar explorer, ornithologist, pilot, soldier, geographer and photographer.
- Wirkus, Faustin E. US Marine who ruled Haiti.
- Witwer, H. C. War correspondent and prolific short-story author.
- Wood, Major General Leonard. Distinguished US Army officer.
- Yancey, Lon. USN veteran and history-making aviator.

== Speakers ==
Notable speakers before the club include the following:

- 1926 January 16: Ezra Meeker.
- 1926 January 16. Lt. Roland G. Mayer. Survivor of the airship Shenandoah, which crashed in 1925.
- 1931 January ??: Frank Buck. Hunter and filmmaker.
- 1931 January ??: Owen R. Jones. Accompanist to Adelina Patti.
- 1932 December ??: J. Allan Dunn. Adventure pulp writer.
- 1936 April 16: Frederick Houk Law. Traveler and writer.
- 1936 May 21: J. Allan Dunn.
- 1936 May 21: Sasha Siemel. Adventurer, hunter, guide, actor, writer, photographer, and lecturer.
- 1936 October 15: Tony Sarg. Illustrator.
- 1936 October 15: Leon Dabo. Artist.
- 1936 November 19: Martin Johnson. Traveler and filmmaker.
- 1936 November 19: Alan Villiers. Author and explorer.
- 1936 November 19: Walter Granger. President of the Explorers Club.
- 1937 January 21: Attilio Gatti. Italian explorer, author and filmmaker.
- 1937 May 20: Julien Bryan. Photographer, filmmaker, and documentarian.
- 1938 March 17: Sasha Siemel.
- 1938 April 21: William E. Young. Sailor, shark expert.
- 1938 May 19: Claus K. Clausen. Decorated US Navy officer.
- 1938 December 15: Jimmy Hare. Photojournalist.
- 1939 January 19: Ralph DePalma. Dirt track auto racing champion.
- 1939 February 16: Jimmy Jemail. NFL player and journalist.
- 1939 April 20: Lowell Thomas. Popular journalist.
- 1939 April 20: Arch Whitehouse. Prolific aviation fiction pulp writer.
- 1939 April 20: Frank Buck.
- 1939 May 18: Vilhjalmur Stefansson. Canadian Arctic explorer, President of the Explorers Club.
- 1939 October 19: Harrison Forman. World traveler and author.
- 1939 October 19: Lon Yancey. US Navy veteran and history-making aviator.
- 1940 January 18: Alexander Kerensky. A key figure in the Russian Revolution.
- 1940 February 15: Linton Wells. Foreign correspondent and pioneer broadcaster.
- 1940 March 21: Sterling Hayden. Sailor and future film actor.
- 1940 March 21: Harrison Forman.
- 1940 March 21: Harold McCracken. Author and adventurer.
- 1940 April 18: David Sarnoff. RCA executive.
- 1941 February 20: Harrison Forman.
- 1941 May 15: Lewis E. Lawes. Warden of Sing Sing.
- 1942 February 19: Harry A. Franck. Prolific travel writer, "prince of vagabonds."
- 1942 February 19: Charles B. Whitehead. American flyer in the RAF.
- 1942 May 21: Robert Ripley. Ripley's Believe It or Not! cartoonist.
- 1942 May 21: Jean Delacour. Bird expert of the Bronx Zoo.
- 1954 ??: Fritz Duquesne. "My Life – In and Out of Prison"
- 1962 May 16: Carl von Hoffman. Soldier, adventurer, and author.

== Presidents ==
#	From	To	President
1	1912	1917	Henry Collins Walsh
2	1918	1918	Robert Welles Ritchie
3	1919	1925	William E. Aughinbaugh
4	1926	1927	Wesley H. Wallace
5	1928	1928	Norman Schwarzkopf
6	1929	1930	George W. B. Witten
7	1930	1930	Fred J. Willock
8	1930	1930	George W. B. Witten
9	1931	1931	Wyndham Phinny
10	1932	1932	C. E. Russell
11	1933	1933	John J. Lyons
12	1934	1935	Tex O'Rourke
13	1936	1937	Raymond C. Schindler
14	1939	1939	Henry M. Kalvin
15	1940	1940	Lewis N. Cotlow
16	1941	1942	Charles R. Haffenden
17	1943	1944	John McElraevy, Jr.
18	1945	1945	James B. Pond
19	1946	1946	Charles R. Haffenden
20	1947	1947	Raymond C. Schindler
21	1948	1948	Harry Bruno
22	1949	1949	Harry C. M. Reed
23	1950	1950	Arthur M. Menken
24	1951	1951	G. Theon Wright
25	1952	1952	Norris L. Bowen
26	1952	1952	Russell B. Aitken
27	1953	1953	Paulus P. Powell
28	1954	1954	Edward L. Bill
29	1955	1955	G. Theon Wright
30	1956	1956	John S. Davis, Jr.
31	1957	1957	Raymond E. Buck
32	1958	1958	Bernt Balchen
33	1959	1959	Patrick B. Fay
34	1960	1960	Ansel E. Talbert
35	1961	1961	A. Fred Nielson
36	1962	1962	Carl von Hoffman
37	1963	1963	Frederick Houk Law (Emeritus)
33	1964	1964	Justin William Pierce

== Award winners ==
The club also awarded medals and honors. Recipients include:

- Sasha Siemel

=== Gold Medal ===
- William O. Douglas (1964). Supreme Court justice; mountain climber.

=== Bronze Medal ===
- Alexander de Seversky (1971)

=== Life Membership ===
- William Willis (1954). Ocean rafter.

== Books ==
=== Call to Adventure ===
In 1935, Robert Spiers Benjamin edited an anthology Call to Adventure. Contributors were:

- Major George Witten, president
- Zane Grey
- Lowell Thomas
- Allan J. Villiers
- Frank M. Hawks
- A. E. Dingle
- Gordon MacCreagh
- Seymour Pond
- F.F. Van de Water
- Victor Shaw
- George E. Holt
- S. E. Sangster
- Frances Gow-Smith
- John N. Page
- Frederick Law
- Ozark Ripley
- Victor Weybright
- F. S. Dellenbaugh
- W. H. Wallace
- F. J. Franklin

=== The Adventurers' Golden Jubilee ===
In 1964, the club published The Adventurers' Golden Jubilee 1912–1962: A History of the Adventurers Club of New York.

== See also ==
- Explorers Club, an extant club of about the same age, also founded in New York with a scientific mission
- National Geographic Society, founded in Washington D.C., it is one of the largest nonprofit scientific and educational organizations in the world today.
