= Arthur Sullivant Hoffman =

American magazine editor (1876–1966)

Arthur Sullivant Hoffman (September 28, 1876 – March 15, 1966) was an American magazine editor. Hoffman is best known for editing the acclaimed pulp magazine Adventure from 1912 to 1927, as well as playing a role in the creation of the American Legion.

== Early life ==
Hoffman was born in Columbus, Ohio, and graduated from Ohio State University a Phi Beta Kappa in 1897. He briefly taught English in a high school and did miscellaneous journalism in Ohio. Hoffman worked on several magazines: The Chatauquan, The Smart Set, and Watson's Magazine, before moving on to become managing editor of Transatlantic Tales, and The Delineator, where Hoffman worked with Theodore Dreiser. Hoffman also wrote a number of short stories for Everybody's Magazine and McClure's Magazine, including a humorous series about the adventures of an Irishman, Patsy Moran.

In 1910, the Ridgway company decided to launch a pulp magazine, Adventure. Hoffman was on Adventure's staff from its beginning, and succeeded Trumbull White as editor in 1912.

== Adventure editor ==
Hoffman began to develop a "stable" of writers for Adventure that would publish adventure fiction that was well-plotted, had good characterization and was historically and geographically accurate. Hoffman's Adventure stable would eventually include some of the most distinguished popular fiction writers of the era, including John Buchan, Rafael Sabatini, Talbot Mundy, Harold Lamb, Edgar Wallace, Walt Coburn, W.C. Tuttle, Arthur O. Friel, Gordon Young and T.S. Stribling. Richard Bleiler described Hoffman as a "tenacious, contentious and brilliant" editor. For the first two years of his term as Adventure editor, Hoffman was assisted by writer Sinclair Lewis. Hoffman and Lewis worked on the famous "Camp-Fire" page in "Adventure", which featured readers' letters, biographies of the magazines' authors and discussions of various issues. Hoffman added several departments to Adventure, including "Ask Adventure", where numerous experts in various fields answered readers' questions on subjects as diverse as bicycle repair and crocodile trapping. Other departments Hoffman created included "Lost Trails", (helping readers find lost relatives and friends), "Weapons, Past and Present" (the history of weapons) and "Mountains and Mountaineering" (discussing which mountains were best for climbing, hunting, and camping). In addition to Lewis, Hoffman was assisted in editing by several other writers, included Elmer Davis, Larry Barretto, L. Patrick Greene, J.D. Newsom, William Corcoran and Anthony Rud.

Hoffman also created a special "Off-the-trail" section for stories different from the normal type of Adventure fiction. These included the science fiction story "The Green Splotches" by T.S. Stribling, a genre Adventure did not normally publish.

Hoffman also obtained the services of some famous artists to illustrate Adventure, including Rockwell Kent and Lejaren Hiller, Sr.

Hoffman was co-founder of the Adventurers' Club of New York in 1912. Sinclair Lewis was secretary for several years. Numerous Adventure contributors were club members, including H. Bedford-Jones, H. D. Couzens, Captain Dingle, J. Allan Dunn, Lejaren Hiller, Arthur D. Howden-Smith, Hapsburg Liebe, Gordon MacCreagh and Talbot Mundy. In April 1962, the club's Board of Governors named Hoffman President Emeritus and Honorary Life Member.

Concerned about the threat of war, Hoffman set up a committee in 1915 designed to secure pledges from former soldiers whose skills could be used in times of need. The committee was named "The American Legion". The pledges were sent to Washington, where they were used to create two regiments of aircraft mechanics. After the war, the American Legion adopted the name of Hoffman's organisation; Hoffman stated in 1934 that he was "delighted" to give up his claim to the name.

Hoffman often used the pages of Adventure as a pulpit for his political views. After the United States entered World War One in 1917, Hoffman used Adventure to advocate support for the war effort. Hoffman's editorials also adopted a strong anti-German tone. In 1918, Hoffman added two specifically anti-German columns to Adventure, "Fighting the Hun Web" and "How to Help Win the War".

Hoffman also edited a companion pulp magazine to Adventure, Romance (1919-1920). Romance was aimed at female readers and featured writers from Adventure such as Mundy and Stribling, as well as Joseph Conrad, Georgia Wood Pangborn and Beatrice Grimshaw. However, Romance was not successful and was cancelled after a year.

Writer Lee Server describes Adventure under Hoffman's editorship as "inarguably one of the handful of great pulp publications" and magazine historian Mike Ashley states in its that under Hoffman: "Adventure, along with Blue Book and Argosy, was one of the top three American pulp magazines to which all such authors aspired to contribute."

== Later years ==
After leaving Adventure, Hoffman worked as the editor of McClure's Magazine before retiring to New York. Hoffman wrote some of the first books on creative writing and how to sell such writing commercially, including Fundamentals of Fiction Writing (1922) and The Writing of Fiction (1934). Reviewing Hoffman's Fundamentals of Fiction Writing, The Bookman magazine stated "we believe Mr. Hoffman has touched the deepest note thus far sounded. An excellent book to serve as a postgraduate course in short story writing". Hoffman died in Selinsgrove, Pennsylvania.

== Bibliography ==
- Fundamentals of Fiction Writing (1922)
- Fiction Writers On Fiction Writing (1923)
- Adventure's Best Stories-1926 (1926) (Editor)
- The service offered in the teaching of fiction writing and in analysis, diagnosis, criticism and consultation for both new and established writers (1929)
- The Writing of Fiction (1934)
- "Introduction" to Some must wander by George Gatlin (1934)
- "That Earlier American Legion," American Legion Monthly, July 1934
- Fiction Writing Self-Taught: A New Approach (1943)
