= Joseph Montague =

Joseph Montague may refer to:

- Joseph Montague, pen name of J. Allan Dunn (1872–1941), American pulp magazine writer
- Joseph C. Montague, served in the California legislature
