= Captain Dingle =

English sailor and writer

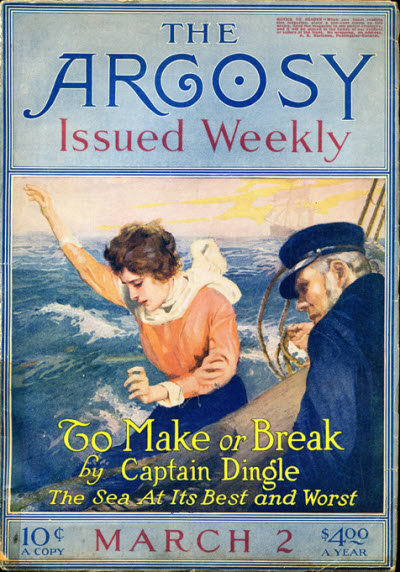
Dingle's "To Make or Break" was serialized in The Argosy in 1918

Aylward Edward "A.E." Dingle was a sailor and writer. He was born in Oxford, England, in 1874. He died in Cornwall in 1947.

== Sailor ==
He spent 22 years at sea, and was shipwrecked five times. Ships sailed on:

- Thermopylae (clipper)

=== Castaway on St Paul Island ===
In 1893, Dingle joined a salvage. The schooner Black Pearl sailed from Mahe, the Seychelle Islands to the Crozets, seeking gold that had gone down with the immigrant ship Strathmore. They found the sunken wreck, and its strongbox, but were unable to remove it. Eventually, they were driven off by gales. On the return voyage, the Black Pearl was wrecked near St. Paul Island. Both crew survived, though the Black Pearl was completely lost. They survived twelve weeks on the island, eating rabbit, goat and fish. Exploring, they found gold from a buried 1870s wreck. On the first morning of the twelfth week, they were rescued by a French bark.

== Writer ==
He wrote pulp fiction for magazines such as Adventure and Blue Book under the names 'Captain A. E. Dingle' and Sinbad. In New York, he shared a flat with writer Gordon MacCreagh and his pet python Billy.

He sold his first story, "Blind Luck on St. Paul", to Adventure for somewhere between forty-five and sixty-five dollars, and it appeared in the January 1913 issue.

He wrote an autobiography, A Modern Sinbad, which sold well in the UK. It was titled Rough Hewn in the US.

In 1912, the new editor of Adventure, Arthur Sullivant Hoffman co-founded the Adventurers' Club of New York. The first arrivals for the first meeting were a group of five: Dingle, Hoffman, Hoffman's assistant Sinclair Lewis, and two others. Dingle was first through the door and forever after claimed to be the club's first member. Dingle remained an active participant in the club for the remainder of his life.

In 1942, he was a guest on BBC Radio's Desert Island Discs, perhaps the programme's only experienced castaway.

=== Selected works ===
- "Blind Luck on St. Paul" (1913)
- "To Make or Break" (1918)
- "The Pirate Woman" (1918)
- "Gold Out of Celebes" (1920)
- A Modern Sinbad: An Autobiography (1933)
- "Spin: A Yarn Sailor" (1934)
- "Sinister Eden" (1934)
- "Red Saunders: The Chronicle of a Genial Outcast" (1934)
- "Not Wisely" (1936)
- "Mary: First Mate" (1937)
- "Nor Breed Nor Birth" (1937)
- "Mock Star" (1938)
- "Nita of Martinique" (1938)
- "Adrift" (1939)
- "The Bomb Ship" (1942)
- "Pirates May Fly" (1943)
- "Old Glory" (1945)
- "Black Joker" (1946)
- "Reckless Tide" (1947)
- "The Petrel's Path" (1947)
- "The Corpse Came Back" (1948)
- "Out of the Blue" (1948)

=== Collections ===
- Out of the Wreck and Other Nautical Tales from the Pulps (2006, Wildside Press)
- Old Sails (2009, Black Dog Books) inc bibliography
