= Jack Coggins bibliography =

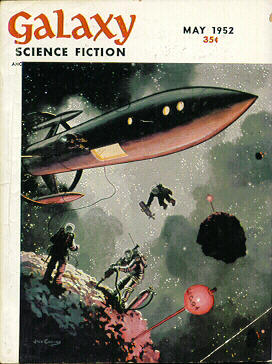
Coggins's painting "Mining an Asteroid" appeared on the cover of the May 1952 issue of Galaxy Science Fiction, his first SF magazine cover

Jack Banham Coggins was an illustrator, author and artist, who is best known in the United States for his oil paintings of predominantly marine subjects and for his books on space travel.

Coggins also wrote and/or illustrated a large number of books on wide range of subjects, as well as providing many illustrations for advertisements, magazine articles and magazine covers.

The following are lists of all the known books illustrated and/or written by Coggins, and all of the known magazine covers he illustrated. Original U.S. editions only of the books and magazines are listed; many of these were published in other countries and languages. Several of the books have been re-published in new editions, which are not listed. All the listings link to an image of the original publication, more information and images are available on the external Link at the bottom of this page.

== Terminology ==
Included with listed books are LCCN - Library of Congress Control Number and ISBN - International Standard Book Number, where available.

== Books Written and Illustrated by Jack Coggins ==
- 1951 Rockets, Jets, Guided Missiles and Space Ships, Co-author: Fletcher Pratt, Publisher: Random House LCCN 51-7326
- 1952 By Space Ship to the Moon, Co-author: Fletcher Pratt, Publisher: Random House, LCCN 52-7219
- 1957 Illustrated Book of Knights, Publisher: Grosset & Dunlap Inc. LCCN 57-14031
- 1958 Rockets, Satellites and Space Travel, Co-author: Fletcher Pratt, Publisher: Random House, LCCN 58-6192
- 1959 Young Viking, Publisher: Tab Books
- 1962 Arms and Equipment of the Civil War, Publisher: Doubleday & Co., LCCN 61-11810
- 1963 Flashes and Flags, Publisher: Dodd, Mead & Co., LCCN 63-10192
- 1963 Horsemen of the World, Publisher: Doubleday & Co., LCCN 63-7144
- 1965 Nets Overboard, Publisher: Dodd, Mead & Co., LCCN 65-11212
- 1966 Fighting Man, The, Publisher: Doubleday & Co., LCCN 66-20936
- 1966 Horseman’s Bible, The, Doubleday & Co., LCCN 66-17421
- 1966 Hydrospace, Publisher: Dodd, Mead & Co., LCCN 65-27969
- 1967 Boys in the Revolution, Publisher: Stackpole Books, LCCN 66-22825
- 1967 By Star and Compass, Publisher: Dodd, Mead & Co., LCCN 67-22195
- 1969 Ships and Seamen of the American Revolution, Publisher: Promontory Press, LCCN 73-85650 ISBN 0-88394-032-9
- 1971 Prepare to Dive, Publisher: Dodd, Mead & Co., LCCN 77-153893
- 1972 Campaign for Guadalcanal, The, Publisher: Doubleday & Co., LCCN 75-140063 ISBN 0-385-04354-6
- 1980 Campaign for North Africa, The, Publisher: Doubleday & Co., LCCN 79-3179 ISBN 0-385-04351-1
- 1983 Marine Painter’s Guide, Publisher: Van Nostrand Reinhold Co. Inc, LCCN 82-13684 ISBN 0-442-21495-2

== Books Illustrated by Jack Coggins ==
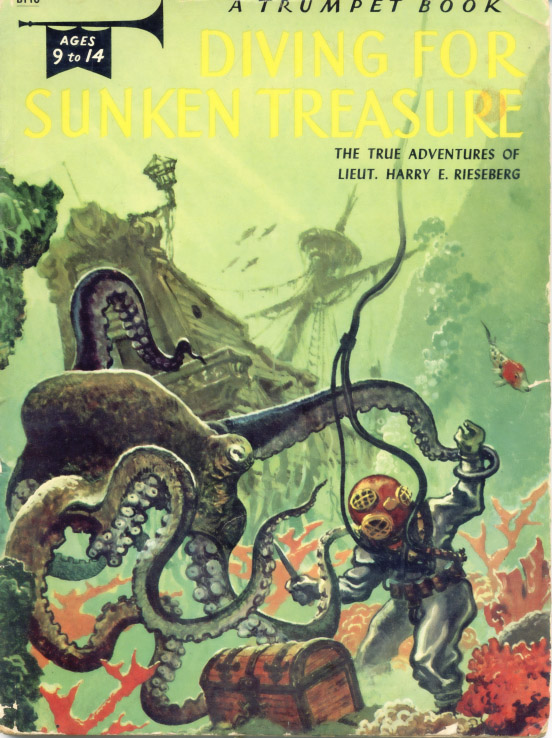
Coggins provided the cover art for Harry E. Rieseberg's 1955 Diving for Sunken Treasure

- 1941 Fighting Ships of the US Navy, Author: Fletcher Pratt, Publisher: Garden City Publishing LCCN 41-26052
- 1943 Subchaser Jim, Author: Josef Berger, Publisher: Little, Brown & Co. LCCN 43-12359
- 1946 Lion of Barbary, The, Author: Eleanor Hoffmann, Publisher: Holiday House LCCN 47-30015
- 1946 Counterspy Jim, Author: Josef Berger, Publisher: Little, Brown & Co. LCCN 46-5655
- 1947 Ships of the US Merchant Marine, Author: S. Kip Farrington, Publisher: E.P. Dutton & Co. Inc LCCN 47-12469
- 1953 Mystery of the Lion Ring, The, Author; Eleanor Hoffmann, Publisher: Dodd, Mead & Co. LCCN 52-13585
- 1953 First Book of Sailing, The, Author: Marion Lineaweaver, Publisher: Franklin Watts Inc, LCCN 53-6142
- 1953 Merry Mouse - Trip to the Moon, Author: Alma Coggins, Publisher: Jolly Books
- 1953 Great Trains of the World, Author: Wyatt Blassingame, Publisher: Random House, LCCN 53-6290
- 1954 Untouched by Human Hands, Author: Robert Sheckley, Publisher: Ballantine Books, LCCN 54-7987
- 1955 Big Book of Stars, Author: Leon A. Hausman, Publisher: Grosset & Dunlap LCCN 55-3023
- 1955 Diving for Sunken Treasure, Author: Harry E. Rieseberg, Publisher: Saml. Gabriel Sons & Co. LCCN 55-3563
- 1955 Science Book of Space Travel, The, Author: Harold L. Goodwin, Publisher: Pocket Books Inc. LCCN 54-6543
- 1957 Ferdinand Magellan, Author: Seymour Gates Pond, Publisher: Random House, LCCN 57-7515
- 1957 Space Satellite, Author: Beeland & Wells, Publisher: Prentice-Hall Inc., LCCN 57-13075
- 1958 All About Rockets and Jets, Author: Fletcher Pratt, Publisher: Random House Inc. LCCN 58-6192
- 1959 Engines, Author: L. Sprague de Camp, Publisher: Golden Press LCCN 59-2075
- 1959 Submarines, Author: Edward Stephens, Publisher: Golden Press LCCN 60-3881
- 1959 William the Conqueror, Author: Thomas B. Costain, Publisher: Random House, LCCN 59-5523
- 1961 Early Automobiles, Author: Eugene Rachlis, Publisher: Golden Press, LCCN 61-15012
- 1961 Navigation in the Jet Age, Author: Robert Wells, Publisher: Dodd, Mead & Co., LCCN 61-14347
- 1962 Early Warning, Author: Robert Wells, Publisher: Prentice-Hall Inc., LCCN 62-9957
- 1962 Hot Rod Thunder, Author: Joe Brennan, Publisher: Doubleday & Co., LCCN 62-8928
- 1963 Let’s Go on a Space Trip, Author: Michael Chester, Publisher: G.P. Putnam's Sons, LCCN 63-7733

== Magazine Covers Illustrated by Jack Coggins ==
- April 1943 Popular Science Magazine
- November 1943 Yachting Magazine
- June 1948 Yachting Magazine
- March 1951 Yachting Magazine
- March 1952 Saga Magazine
- May 1952 Galaxy Science Fiction
- July 1952 Galaxy Science Fiction
- August 1952 Yachting Magazine
- September 1952 Galaxy Science Fiction
- October 1952 Startling Stories
- November 1952 Galaxy Science Fiction
- February 1953 Thrilling Wonder Stories
- April 1953 Thrilling Wonder Stories
- Apr-May 1953 Amazing Stories
- May 1953 The Magazine of Fantasy & Science Fiction
- August 1953 Thrilling Wonder Stories
- August 1953 The Magazine of Fantasy & Science Fiction
- September 1953 The Magazine of Fantasy & Science Fiction
- November 1953 Sci-Fi Quarterly
- Spring 1954 Fantastic Story
- May 1954 The Magazine of Fantasy & Science Fiction
- Summer 1954 Thrilling Wonder Stories
- Fall 1954 Fantastic Story
- Fall 1954 Thrilling Wonder Stories
- Winter 1954 Thrilling Wonder Stories
- July 1956 Galaxy Science Fiction
- September 1956 Galaxy Science Fiction
- February 1957 Galaxy Science Fiction
- April 1957 Galaxy Science Fiction
- August 1957 Galaxy Science Fiction
- January 1958 United States Naval Institute Proceedings
- July 1958 United States Naval Institute Proceedings
- 1970 U.S. Department of Commerce
- Summer 1970 SF Greats No. 18
- February 1979 United States Naval Institute Proceedings
- 1967 Sci-Fi Yearbook Number 1
- Autumn 2002 Naval War College Review
