= George Holt =

George Holt may refer to:

- George Holt (merchant) (1825–1896), Liverpool ship-owner, merchant and philanthropist
- George Holt (cotton-broker) (1790–1861), British cotton-broker, merchant and philanthropist, father of the above
- George Holt (actor) (1878–1944), American actor/director
- George Chandler Holt (1843–1931), U.S. federal judge
- George Holt (Medal of Honor) (1840–?), U.S. Navy sailor and Medal of Honor recipient
- George Edmund Holt (1881–1950), American journalist
