= Herbert Norman Schwarzkopf =

Herbert Norman Schwarzkopf could refer to:

- Norman Schwarzkopf Sr. (1895-1958), United States Army general and first superintendent of the New Jersey State Police
- Norman Schwarzkopf Jr. (1934-2012), United States Army general and commander of Coalition Forces in the Gulf War
