= Kelty (company) =

Outdoor sporting good manufacturer

KELTY
- Type: Subsidiary
- Industry: Outdoor equipment
- Founded: 1952; 74 years ago
- Founder: Asher Kelty
- Headquarters: 1 International Ct Broomfield, CO 80021, US
- Parent: Exxel Outdoors, LLC
- Website: www.kelty.com

Kelty is a manufacturer of backpacks, tents, and sleeping bags owned by Exxel Outdoors, LLC. The business is based in Broomfield, Colorado.

== History ==
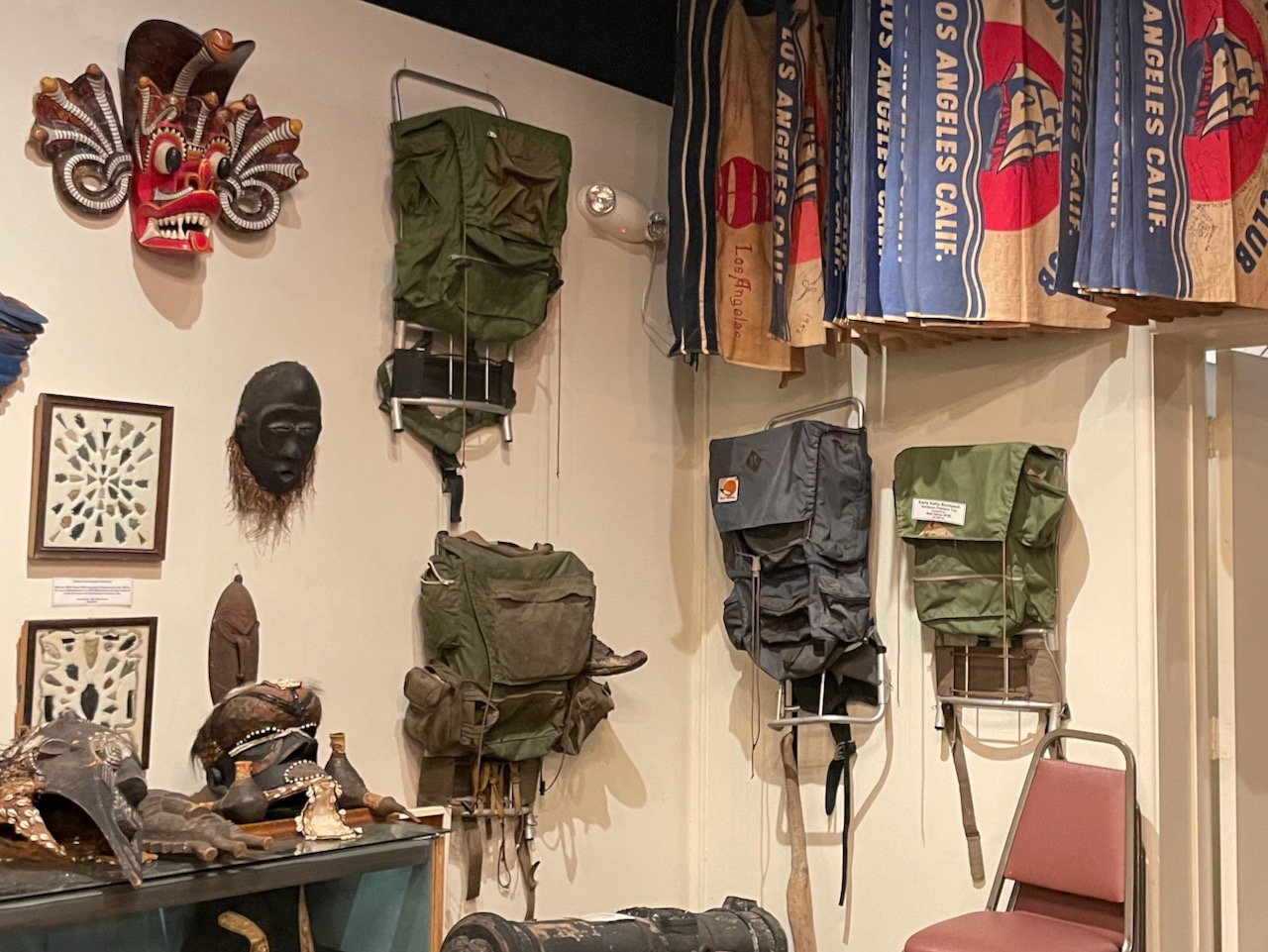
Early Kelty backpacks on display at The Adventurers Club of Los Angeles, where Dick Kelty was a member

The company was started in 1952 by Asher "Dick" Kelty (September 13, 1919 – January 12, 2004), who was one of the first gear designers to produce and market an external-frame backpack designed specifically for civilian use. He is considered to be the inventor of the aluminum-framed backpack. Kelty was also the provider of gear in the 1970s cult classic TV series The Land Of The Lost.

== Products ==
Kelty products are widely sold by large outdoor outfitters such as Eastern Mountain Sports and REI, and Kaviso, among others. Kelty is one of a few companies that still specializes in external-frame backpacks for outdoors use. Kelty released approximately 170 products / 253 models with annual catalog updates. Tents are one of the core products of Kelty. Kelty tents are made of high-quality materials. Kelty tent fabrics are made of Polyester, which is longer-lasting than Nylon, and the poles are made of lightweight aluminum and carbon fiber. Kelty's focus as a brand remains budget friendly outdoor gear for camping and backpacking. Kelty also maintains a tactical / military spec division for government supply needs.

== Product categories ==
- Backpacks
- Outdoor gear
- Sleep solution
- Tents and shelters
- Outdoor kids' items
- Camp furniture

== Competing company ==
Dick Kelty's son, Richard Kelty, became one of the founders of Sierra West, a competing company.
