= Altus Press =

- Founded: 2006
- Founder: Matthew Moring
- Country of origin: United States
- Publication types: Books, E-Books
- Official website: www.steegerbooks.com

Altus Press is a publisher of works primarily related to the pulp magazines from the 1910s to the 1950s.

== History ==
Founded in 2006 by Matthew Moring, Altus Press publishes collections primarily focussed on series characters, although they also publish stand-alone novels and short stories too. They are also the publisher of the new Doc Savage novels written by Lester Dent and Will Murray, as well as Murray's new Tarzan novels.

Their pulp reprints are either single- or multi-volume collections, containing all the stories of a specific character, with new introductions written by pulp historians. Due to this editorial decision, many are spread across several volumes.

Altus Press has relaunched the pulp magazines Argosy, Black Mask, and Famous Fantastic Mysteries.

List of Altus Press publications
| Title | Author | Series | Release date |
|---|---|---|---|
| The Complete Air Adventures of Gales & McGill, Volume 2: 1930-31 | Frederick Nebel | The Frederick Nebel Library | July 12, 2018 |
| The Complete Air Adventures of Gales & McGill, Volume 1: 1927-29 | Frederick Nebel; introduction by John Locke | The Frederick Nebel Library | April 9, 2017 |
| The Devil's Bosun | H. Bedford-Jones | The H. Bedford-Jones Library | December 10, 2015 |
| Our Far Flung Battle Line | H. Bedford-Jones | The H. Bedford-Jones Library | December 10, 2015 |
| The Complete Cases of The Bleeder | Edith and Ejler Jakobsson; introduction by Garyn G. Roberts, Ph.D. | The Dime Detective Library | November 19, 2015 |
| The Complete Cases of Mr. Maddox, Volume 2 | T.T. Flynn | The Dime Detective Library | November 19, 2015 |
| The Complete Cases of The Reckoner | Carroll John Daly | The Dime Detective Library | November 19, 2015 |
| The Complete Cases of Secrets, Inc., Volume 1 | Frederick C. Davis; introduction by Will Murray | The Dime Detective Library | November 19, 2015 |
| The Complete Cases of Bail-Bond Dodd, Volume 1 | Norbert Davis | The Dime Detective Library | November 19, 2015 |
| The Complete Cases of Keyhole Kerry, Volume 2 | Frederick C. Davis | The Dime Detective Library | November 19, 2015 |
| The Complete Cases of Jeffery Wren, Volume 1 | G.T. Fleming-Roberts; introduction by James T. Roberts | The Dime Detective Library | November 19, 2015 |
| Doc Savage: The Secret of Satan's Spine | Kenneth Robeson, Lester Dent & Will Murray | The Wild Adventures of Doc Savage | November 2, 2015 |
| Them That Lives By Their Guns: The Collected Hard-Boiled Stories of Race Williams, Volume 1 | Carroll John Daly; introduction by Brooks E. Hefner | Race Williams | October 27, 2015 |
| Doc Savage: The Frightened Fish | Kenneth Robeson, Lester Dent & Will Murray | The Wild Adventures of Doc Savage | November 2, 2015 |
| Doc Savage: The Jade Ogre | Kenneth Robeson, Lester Dent & Will Murray | The Wild Adventures of Doc Savage | October 20, 2015 |
| Doc Savage: Flight Into Fear | Kenneth Robeson, Lester Dent & Will Murray | The Wild Adventures of Doc Savage | October 20, 2015 |
| The Black Bat Omnibus Volume 3 | Whitney Ellsworth and Norman A. Daniels | The Black Bat | September 7, 2015 |
| Treasure Seekers | H. Bedford-Jones | The H. Bedford-Jones Library | September 7, 2015 |
| The Complete Adventures of the Moon Man, Volume 1: 1933 | Frederick C. Davis; introduction by Andrew Salmon | The Moon Man | August 18, 2015 |
| The Masked Rider Archives Volume 2 | Jay J. Kalez, George A. Starbird and Lincoln Hoffman | The Masked Rider | August 12, 2015 |
| Dead Men Singing: The Men Who Fought For Texas | H. Bedford-Jones | The H. Bedford-Jones Library | July 31, 2015 |
| The Secret 6 Classics: The Suicide Squad's Last Mile | Emile C. Tepperman | The Suicide Squad | July 3, 2015 |
| Genius Jones | Lester Dent; introduction by Will Murray | The Argosy Library | June 2, 2015 |
| When Tigers Are Hunting: The Complete Adventures of Cordie, Soldier of Fortune, Volume 1 | W. Wirt | The Argosy Library; Jimmie Cordie | June 2, 2015 |
| The Swordsman of Mars | Otis Adelbert Kline | The Argosy Library | June 2, 2015 |
| The Sherlock of Sageland: The Complete Tales of Sheriff Henry, Volume 1 | W.C. Tuttle; afterword by Sai Shankar | The Argosy Library; Sheriff Henry | June 2, 2015 |
| The Masked Master Mind | George F. Worts | The Argosy Library | June 2, 2015 |
| Gone North | Charles Alden Seltzer | The Argosy Library | June 2, 2015 |
| Balata | Fred MacIsaac | The Argosy Library | June 2, 2015 |
| Bretwalda | Philip Ketchum | The Argosy Library | June 2, 2015 |
| Draft of Eternity | Victor Rousseau | The Argosy Library | June 2, 2015 |
| Four Corners, Volume 1 | Theodore Roscoe | The Argosy Library; Four Corners | June 2, 2015 |
| Doc Savage: The Sinister Shadow | Kenneth Robeson, Lester Dent & Will Murray | The Wild Adventures of Doc Savage | June 8, 2015 |
| Tarzan: Return to Pal-ul-don | Will Murray | The Wild Adventures of Tarzan | June 7, 2015 |
| The Scorpion Scar: The Complete Tales of Koropok, Volume 2 | Sidney Herschel Small | Koropok | May 7, 2015 |
| The Sphinx Strikes | H. Bedford-Jones | The H. Bedford-Jones Library | May 7, 2015 |
| Civil War Stories (Spring 1940) | Bennett Foster, John Murray Reynolds, John Starr, DeWitt Shank, Ted Fox, and John Wiggan | Replica Editions | May 7, 2015 |
| Secret Agent “X” – The Complete Series Volume 7 | G.T. Fleming-Roberts; introduction by Tom Johnson | Secret Agent “X” | April 23, 2015 |
| Tales of the Werewolf Clan | H. Warner Munn; introduction by John Munn | Horror | April 23, 2015 |
| Mavericks: Longriders of the West, Volume 2 | Tom Mount | Western | April 23, 2015 |
| Kid Calvert: The Complete Series | Clint Douglas and Phil Richards; introduction by Will Murray | Western | April 23, 2015 |
| The Best of Spicy Mystery, Volume 2 | Ellery Watson Calder, Hugh Speer, Robert Leslie Bellem, Clint Morgan, Clive Trent, Jerome Severs Perry, Carl Moore, Cary Moran, and Clark Nelson; introduction by Alfred Jan | Horror | March 4, 2015 |
| In the Grip of the Griffin: The Complete Battles of Gordon Manning & The Griffin, Volume 3 | J. Allan Dunn | Gordon Manning & the Griffin | March 4, 2015 |
| Blood and Steel: The Complete Tales of Kingi Bwana, Volume 4 | Gordon MacCreagh | Kingi Bwana | March 4, 2015 |
| Beyond the Call of Duty: The Complete Tales of Koropok, Volume 1 | Sidney Herschel Small | Koropok | March 4, 2015 |
| The King Makers: The Adventures of Vincent Connor | H. Bedford-Jones | The H. Bedford-Jones Library | March 4, 2015 |
| Defiance Valley: The Complete Northwoods Stories of Frederick Nebel, Volume 1 | Frederick Nebel; introduction by Rob Preston | The Frederick Nebel Library | March 3, 2015 |
| The Complete Adventures of Armless O’Neil (Deluxe Edition) | Dan Cushman; introduction by James Reasoner, with an interview with Dan Cushman | Armless O’Neil | November 30, 2014 |
| The Complete Adventures of Señorita Scorpion (Deluxe Edition) | Les Savage Jr., with Emmett McDowell; introduction and afterword by Will Murray | Señorita Scorpion | November 30, 2014 |
| The Complete Cases of Captain Satan (Deluxe Edition) | William O'Sullivan | Captain Satan | November 30, 2014 |
| Mavericks: Longriders of the West, Volume 1 | Tom Mount | Western | November 30, 2014 |
| Day of Doom: The Complete Battles of Gordon Manning & The Griffin, Volume 2 | J. Allan Dunn | Gordon Manning & the Griffin | November 30, 2014 |
| Black Drums Talking: The Complete Tales of Kingi Bwana, Volume 3 | Gordon MacCreagh | Kingi Bwana | November 30, 2014 |
| Abel Smith of Nantucket | H. Bedford-Jones | The H. Bedford-Jones Library | November 30, 2014 |
| Bellegarde | H. Bedford-Jones | The H. Bedford-Jones Library | November 30, 2014 |
| Texas Shall Be Free! | H. Bedford-Jones | The H. Bedford-Jones Library | November 30, 2014 |
| Bowie Knife | H. Bedford-Jones | The H. Bedford-Jones Library | November 30, 2014 |
| The Complete Cases of Keyhole Kerry, Volume 1 | Frederick C. Davis; introduction by Ed Hulse | The Dime Detective Library | November 30, 2014 |
| The Complete Adventures of Thibaut Corday and the Foreign Legion (Deluxe Edition) | Theodore Roscoe; introduction by Gerd Pircher | Thibaut Corday | November 30, 2014 |
| Unprofitable Ivory: The Complete Tales of Kingi Bwana, Volume 2 | Gordon MacCreagh | Kingi Bwana | October 14, 2014 |
| Cyrano | H. Bedford-Jones | The H. Bedford-Jones Library | October 12, 2014 |
| Doc Savage: The Whistling Wraith | Kenneth Robeson, Lester Dent & Will Murray | The Wild Adventures of Doc Savage | October 12, 2014 |
| Doc Savage: The Ice Genius | Kenneth Robeson, Lester Dent & Will Murray | The Wild Adventures of Doc Savage | October 12, 2014 |
| Long Road to Tomorrow: The Complete Saga, Volume 2 | Arthur Leo Zagat | Dikar and the Bunch | October 10, 2014 |
| The Crime Master: The Complete Battles of Gordon Manning & The Griffin, Volume 1 | J. Allan Dunn | Gordon Manning & the Griffin | October 7, 2014 |
| Buccaneer Blood: The Adventures of Denis Burke | H. Bedford-Jones | The H. Bedford-Jones Library | September 28, 2014 |
| Street Wolf: The Black Mask Stories of Frederick Nebel | Frederick Nebel; introduction by Rob Preston | The Frederick Nebel Library | September 23, 2014 |
| Tomorrow: The Complete Saga, Volume 1 | Arthur Leo Zagat | Dikar and the Bunch | September 20, 2014 |
| Secret Agent “X”: The Resurrection Ring | Stephen Payne | Secret Agent “X” | September 20, 2014 |
| The Lost End of Nowhere: The Complete Tales of Kingi Bwana, Volume 1 | Gordon MacCreagh; introduction by Sai Shankar | Kingi Bwana | September 9, 2014 |
| Grey Maiden: The Story of a Sword Through the Ages, The Complete Saga | Arthur D. Howden Smith | | September 1, 2014 |
| Hell's-a-Poppin’ on Halfaday Creek | James B. Hendryx | The Halfaday Creek Library | August 28, 2014 |
| The Adventures of Faidit and Cercamon | Arthur Gilchrist Brodeur; introduction by Sai Shankar | | August 25, 2014 |
| Badmen on Halfaday Creek | James B. Hendryx; introduction by Garyn Roberts, Ph.D. | The Halfaday Creek Library | August 19, 2014 |
| The Complete Cases of Vee Brown, Volume 1 | Carroll John Daly; introduction by Ed Hulse | The Dime Detective Library | April 23, 2014 |
| The Complete Cases of the Marquis of Broadway, Volume 1 | John Lawrence; introduction by Ed Hulse | The Dime Detective Library | April 20, 2014 |
| The Sphinx Emerald | H. Bedford-Jones | The H. Bedford-Jones Library | April 16, 2014 |
| Doc Savage: The War Makers | Kenneth Robeson, Ryerson Johnson & Will Murray | The Wild Adventures of Doc Savage | April 18, 2014 |
| Doc Savage: White Eyes | Kenneth Robeson, Lester Dent & Will Murray | The Wild Adventures of Doc Savage | April 18, 2014 |
| D’Artagnan: A Sequel to The Three Musketeers | H. Bedford-Jones | The H. Bedford-Jones Library | April 11, 2014 |
| The Complete Cases of Mr. Maddox, Volume 1 | T.T. Flynn; introduction by Ed Hulse | The Dime Detective Library | April 8, 2014 |
| O’Brien, Buccaneer | H. Bedford-Jones | The H. Bedford-Jones Library | March 9, 2014 |
| The Complete Cases of The Rambler, Volume 1 | Fred MacIsaac; introduction by Ed Hulse | The Dime Detective Library | March 31, 2014 |
| The Complete Cases of Cass Blue, Volume 1 | John Lawrence; introduction by Ed Hulse | The Dime Detective Library | March 24, 2014 |
| The King's Passport | H. Bedford-Jones | The H. Bedford-Jones Library | March 15, 2014 |
| The Complete Cases of Inspector Allhoff, Volume 1 | D.L. Champion; introduction by Ed Hulse | The Dime Detective Library | March 10, 2014 |
| Winter Kill: The Complete Cases of MacBride & Kennedy Volume 4: 1935-36 | Frederick Nebel; introduction by Evan Lewis | The Frederick Nebel Library | February 18, 2014 |
| Too Young to Die: The Complete Cases of MacBride & Kennedy Volume 3: 1933-35 | Frederick Nebel; introduction by Evan Lewis | The Frederick Nebel Library | January 17, 2014 |
| Whistle Stop in Space: Further Adventures of Manning Draco, Volume 2 | Kendell Foster Crossen | Manning Draco | January 3, 2014 |
| Once Upon a Star: The Adventures of Manning Draco, Volume 1 | Kendell Foster Crossen | Manning Draco | December 29, 2013 |
| Shake-Down: The Complete Cases of MacBride & Kennedy Volume 2: 1930-33 | Frederick Nebel; introduction by Evan Lewis | The Frederick Nebel Library | December 29, 2013 |
| Raw Law: The Complete Cases of MacBride & Kennedy Volume 1: 1928-30 | Frederick Nebel; introduction by Evan Lewis | The Frederick Nebel Library | December 29, 2013 |
| Doc Savage: Python Isle | Kenneth Robeson, Lester Dent & Will Murray | The Wild Adventures of Doc Savage | December 19, 2013 |
| Doc Savage: Phantom Lagoon | Kenneth Robeson, Lester Dent & Will Murray | The Wild Adventures of Doc Savage | December 17, 2013 |
| Doc Savage: The Miracle Menace | Kenneth Robeson, Lester Dent & Will Murray | The Wild Adventures of Doc Savage | October 13, 2013 |
| Doc Savage: His Apocalyptic Life | Philip José Farmer | The Wild Adventures of Doc Savage | September 3, 2013 |
| Master of Midnight: The Collected Captain Zero | G.T. Fleming-Roberts; introduction by Stephen Payne | | August 29, 2013 |
| The Saga of Halfaday Creek | James B. Hendryx | The Halfaday Creek Library | August 19, 2013 |
| The Complete Tales of Doctor Satan | Paul Ernst; introduction by John Pelan | | August 15, 2013 |
| The Complete Adventures of Hazard & Partridge | Robert J. Pearsall; introduction by Nathan Vernon Madison | | August 13, 2013 |
| The Masked Detective Omnibus Volume 1 | Norman A. Daniels; introduction by Tom Johnson | The Masked Detective | August 8, 2013 |
| Dr. Thaddeus C. Harker: The Complete Tales | Edwin Truett Long; introduction by Tom Johnson | | July 22, 2013 |
| Hidden Ghosts: The Lost Stories of Paul S. Powers | Paul S. Powers; introduction by Laurie Powers | | July 8, 2013 |
| The Collected Tales of Sangroo the Sun-God | J. Irving Crump | | July 4, 2013 |
| Wordslingers: An Epitaph for the Western | Will Murray | | June 17, 2013 |
| Super-Detective Jim Anthony: The Complete Series Volume 2 | Victor Rousseau; introduction by Morgan A. Wallace | Jim Anthony | June 15, 2013 |
| West of Guam: The Complete Cases of Jo Gar | Raoul Whitfield; introductions by E.R. Hagemann and R.H. Miller | | May 13, 2013 |
| The Masked Rider Archives Volume 1 | Oscar Schisgall and William H. Stueber; introduction by Will Murray | | May 5, 2013 |
| The Complete Cases of Captain Satan, Volume 2 | William O'Sullivan | Captain Satan | April 25, 2013 |
| The Secret 6 Classics: Blood, Sweat and Bullets | Emile C. Tepperman | The Suicide Squad | April 23, 2013 |
| The Complete Cabalistic Cases of Semi Dual, the Occult Detector, Volume 1: 1912 | J.U. Giesy and Junius B. Smith; introduction by Garyn Roberts, Ph.D. | Semi Dual | April 23, 2013 |
| The Black Bat Omnibus Volume 2 | Norman A. Daniels | The Black Bat | April 22, 2013 |
| The White Savage: The Complete Tales of Matalaa | E. Hoffmann Price; introduction by Will Murray | | April 18, 2013 |
| The Complete Cases of Captain Satan, Volume 1 | William O'Sullivan | Captain Satan | April 15, 2013 |
| The Complete Cases of the Crime Magnet | Sax Rohmer; introduction by Will Murray | | March 1, 2013 |
| Doc Savage: Skull Island | Will Murray | The Wild Adventures of Doc Savage, King Kong | February 24, 2013 |
| From Deep Waters: The Complete Adventures of the Major, Volume 1 | L. Patrick Greene; introduction by Ed Hulse | The Major | January 8, 2013 |
| The Complete Casebook of Cardigan, Volume 4: 1935-37 | Frederick Nebel | The Frederick Nebel Library | December 10, 2012 |
| The Heads of Sergeant Baptiste: The Complete Adventures of Thibaut Corday and the Foreign Legion, Volume 4 | Theodore Roscoe | Thibaut Corday | December 10, 2012 |
| The Complete Casebook of Cardigan, Volume 3: 1934-35 | Frederick Nebel | The Frederick Nebel Library | December 3, 2012 |
| The Kid and the Cutthroats: The Complete Adventures of Thibaut Corday and the Foreign Legion, Volume 3 | Theodore Roscoe | Thibaut Corday | November 16, 2012 |
| Death Underground: Terror Trios Featuring Wyatt Blassingame | Wyatt Blassingame; introduction by John Pelan | Horror | October 23, 2012 |
| Toughest in the Legion: The Complete Adventures of Thibaut Corday and the Foreign Legion, Volume 2 | Theodore Roscoe | Thibaut Corday | October 16, 2012 |
| The Swift Revenge of the Green Ghost | Johnston McCulley; introduction by Peter Poplaski | The Johnston McCulley Library | October 8, 2012 |
| Hell in Boxes: The Exploits of Lynn Lash and Foster Fade | Lester Dent; introduction by Will Murray | | October 2, 2012 |
| Doc Savage: Death's Dark Domain | Kenneth Robeson, Lester Dent & Will Murray | The Wild Adventures of Doc Savage | October 1, 2012 |
| Doc Savage: The Forgotten Realm | Kenneth Robeson, Lester Dent & Will Murray | The Wild Adventures of Doc Savage | September 28, 2012 |
| Spawn of the Flames: Terror Trios Featuring Wayne Rogers | Wayne Rogers; introduction by John Pelan | Horror | September 28, 2012 |
| Pulpmaster: The Theodore Roscoe Story | Audrey Parente; foreword by Theodore Roscoe | | September 25, 2012 |
| Secret Agent “X” – The Complete Series Volume 6 | G.T. Fleming-Roberts and Paul Chadwick, introduction by Tom Johnson | Secret Agent “X” | September 10, 2012 |
| The Complete Casebook of Cardigan, Volume 2: 1933 | Frederick Nebel | The Frederick Nebel Library | September 10, 2012 |
| Better Than Bullets: The Complete Adventures of Thibaut Corday and the Foreign Legion, Volume 1 | Theodore Roscoe | Thibaut Corday | September 2, 2012 |
| Devils in the Dark: Terror Trios Featuring Hugh B. Cave | Hugh B. Cave; introduction by John Pelan | Horror | June 19, 2012 |
| Swamp Fetish: The Complete Adventures of Armless O’Neil, Volume 2 | Dan Cushman; introduction by James Reasoner | Armless O’Neil | June 14, 2012 |
| Echoes 30: Three Decades of Pulp Fandom's Greatest Magazine | Ginger Johnson, Tom Johnson, and Will Murray | | June 11, 2012 |
| The Eagle Omnibus | Norman A. Daniels with E. Hoffmann Price; introduction by Tom Johnson | | June 7, 2012 |
| Doc Savage: The Infernal Buddha | Kenneth Robeson, Lester Dent & Will Murray | The Wild Adventures of Doc Savage | May 9, 2012 |
| The Complete Adventures of The Griffon Volume 2 | Arch Whitehouse; introduction by Will Murray | The Griffon | May 9, 2012 |
| The Green Lama: The Complete Pulp Adventures Volume 3 | Kendell Foster Crossen with Adam Lance Garcia; introduction by Martin Grams Jr. | The Green Lama | May 9, 2012 |
| Secret Agent “X”: Master of Madness | Stephen Payne | Secret Agent “X” | May 8, 2012 |
| Tough as Nails: The Complete Cases of Donahue | Frederick Nebel; introduction by Will Murray, notes by Rob Preston | The Frederick Nebel Library | May 7, 2012 |
| The Best of Spicy Mystery, Volume 1 | John Bard, Robert Leslie Bellem, Justin Case, Harley L. Court, Henry Kuttner, Mort Lansing, Lew Merrill, Rex Norman, Jerome Severs Perry, and Colby Quinn; introduction by Alfred Jan | Horror | April 20, 2012 |
| The Complete Casebook of Cardigan, Volume 1: 1931-32 | Frederick Nebel; introduction by Will Murray | The Frederick Nebel Library | March 3, 2012 |
| The Complete Adventures of Richard Knight Volume 1 | Donald E. Keyhoe; introduction by Will Murray | Richard Knight | February 4, 2012 |
| Ki-Gor: The Complete Series Volume 2 | John Peter Drummond | Ki-Gor | January 7, 2012 |
| Doc Savage: Horror in Gold | Kenneth Robeson, Lester Dent & Will Murray | The Wild Adventures of Doc Savage | December 12, 2011 |
| The Secret 6 Classics: Return Engagement With Death | Emile C. Tepperman | The Suicide Squad | December 12, 2011 |
| Dan Fowler: G-Man Companion | Tom Johnson, with Will Murray, Robert Sidney Bowen, Charles Greenberg, and Norvell W. Page | | December 1, 2011 |
| The Dr. Zeng Omnibus | E. Hoffmann Price, W.T. Ballard, and Robert Leslie Bellem; introduction by Will Murray | | November 14, 2011 |
| The Man in Purple | Johnston McCulley and Tom Johnson | The Johnston McCulley Library | November 11, 2011 |
| The Green Lama: The Complete Pulp Adventures Volume 2 | Kendell Foster Crossen; introduction by Michelle Nolan | The Green Lama | November 2, 2011 |
| The Black Bat Companion | Tom Johnson, with Norman A. Daniels, Nico Mathies, Matthew Moring, Will Murray, Al Tonik, Prentice Winchell, and illustrated by Kin Platt and Raymond Thayer | The Black Bat | October 18, 2011 |
| The Crimes of the Scarlet Ace: The Complete Stories of Major Lacy & Amusement, Inc. | Theodore A. Tinsley; introduction by Will Murray | | October 18, 2011 |
| G Stands for Glory: The G-Man Stories of Norvell Page | Norvell W. Page; introduction by Will Murray | | September 11, 2011 |
| Writings in Bronze | Will Murray | | July 28, 2011 |
| Doc Savage: The Desert Demons | Kenneth Robeson, Lester Dent & Will Murray | The Wild Adventures of Doc Savage | July 24, 2011 |
| Riding the Pulp Trail | Paul S. Powers; introduction by Laurie Powers | | July 17, 2011 |
| Secret Agent “X” – The Complete Series Volume 5 | Paul Chadwick and G.T. Fleming-Roberts; introduction by Tom Johnson | Secret Agent “X” | June 26, 2011 |
| The Complete Adventures of Señorita Scorpion, Volume 2 | Les Savage Jr., with Emmett McDowell; introduction by Will Murray | Señorita Scorpion | May 24, 2011 |
| The Green Lama: The Complete Pulp Adventures Volume 1 | Kendell Foster Crossen; introduction by Will Murray | The Green Lama | May 20, 2011 |
| The Complete Adventures of Señorita Scorpion, Volume 1 | Les Savage Jr.; introduction by Will Murray | Señorita Scorpion | May 14, 2011 |
| The Phantom Detective: Phantoms in Bronze | Laurence Donovan; introduction by Will Murray | The Phantom Detective | April 10, 2011 |
| Dime Detective Companion | James L. Traylor with William E. Barrett, Carroll John Daly, Frederick C. Davis, T.T. Flynn, Monte Herridge, Marvin Lachman, John Lawrence, and Will Murray | The Dime Detective Library | March 27, 2011 |
| Exciting Pulp Tales | Tom Johnson | | February 13, 2011 |
| The Secret 6 Classics: League of the Grateful Dead | Emile C. Tepperman | The Suicide Squad | December 31, 2010 |
| When the Death-Bat Flies: The Detective Stories of Norvell Page | Norvell W. Page; introduction by Will Murray | | November 11, 2010 |
| Diamondstone: Magician-Sleuth | G.T. Fleming-Roberts; introduction by Will Murray | | September 11, 2010 |
| Hell on Friday: the Johnny Saxon Trilogy | William G. Bogart; introduction by Will Murray | | September 11, 2010 |
| Secret Agent “X” – The Complete Series Volume 4 | Paul Chadwick, Emile C. Tepperman and G.T. Fleming-Roberts; introduction by Will Murray | Secret Agent “X” | July 11, 2010 |
| The Finding of Lot's Wife | Alfred Clark | | May 30, 2010 |
| The Weird Adventures of the Blond Adder | Lester Dent; introduction by Will Murray | | May 30, 2010 |
| The Curse of the Harcourts | Chandler H. Whipple; introduction by John Pelan | | May 3, 2010 |
| Seekers of the Glittering Fetish: The Complete Adventures of Armless O’Neil, Volume 1 | Dan Cushman | Armless O’Neil | April 18, 2010 |
| The Black Bat Omnibus Volume 1 | Norman A. Daniels; introduction by Tom Johnson | The Black Bat | April 18, 2010 |
| The Casebook of Seekay and Other Prototypes of The Avenger | Paul Ernst; introduction by Will Murray | | March 25, 2010 |
| Yellow Men Sleep | Jeremy Lane | | February 27, 2010 |
| Wings of Danger | Arthur A. Nelson | | February 27, 2010 |
| Triple Detective #4 (Fall 1956) | Capt. Kerry McRoberts, Robert Wallace and Tom Johnson | | February 13, 2010 |
| Under the Andes | Rex Stout | | February 12, 2010 |
| Secret Agent “X” – The Complete Series Volume 3 | Emile C. Tepperman and Paul Chadwick; introduction by Stephen Payne | Secret Agent “X” | October 25, 2009 |
| Super-Detective Jim Anthony: The Complete Series Volume 1 | Victor Rousseau; introduction by Will Murray | Jim Anthony | October 25, 2009 |
| Alias Mr. Death: The Complete Series | D.L. Champion, George Fielding Eliot and Harold Ward; introduction by Tom Johnson | | August 31, 2009 |
| Ki-Gor: The Complete Series Volume 1 | John Peter Drummond | Ki-Gor | July 24, 2009 |
| Doctor Death Vs. The Secret Twelve, Volume 2 | Harold Ward; introduction by Matthew Moring | Doctor Death | July 8, 2009 |
| The Secret 6: The Complete Adventures | Robert J. Hogan; introduction by Will Murray | | June 10, 2009 |
| Rick Lai's Secret Histories: Criminal Masterminds | Rick Lai | | April 23, 2009 |
| The Bat Strikes Again and Again! | Johnston McCulley; introduction by Will Murray | The Johnston McCulley Library | April 12, 2009 |
| The Strange Adventures of the Purple Scar | John S. Endicott; introduction by Will Murray | | April 7, 2009 |
| Tarrano the Conqueror: Master Edition | Ray Cummings | | January 2, 2009 |
| Secret Agent “X”: Halo of Horror | Stephen Payne | Secret Agent “X” | December 18, 2008 |
| The Pulp Adventures of the Hooded Detective | G.T. Fleming-Roberts; introduction by Will Murray | The Black Hood | December 6, 2008 |
| Triple Detective #1 (Winter 1956) | Norman A. Daniels, Stewart Sterling, Elia Back and Tom Johnson | | December 5, 2008 |
| Secret Agent “X” – The Complete Series Volume 2 | Emile C. Tepperman and Paul Chadwick; introduction by Will Murray | Secret Agent “X” | November 16, 2008 |
| Operator #5: The History of the Purple Wars | Harrison Stievers | | November 2, 2008 |
| Out of this World Adventures #1 (July 1950) | Ray Cummings, Lester Del Ray, A.E. Van Vogt, Joe Kubert, Gardner F. Fox, and John Giunta | Replica Editions | October 5, 2008 |
| The Complete Adventures of the Jungle Queen | James Anson Buck and Joseph W. Musgrave; introduction by Clark J. Holloway | Sheena | September 10, 2008 |
| Rick Lai's Secret Histories: Daring Adventurers | Rick Lai | | September 10, 2008 |
| Secret Agent “X” – The Complete Series Volume 1 | Paul Chadwick; introduction by Will Murray | Secret Agent “X” | September 5, 2008 |
| Triple Detective #2 (Spring 1956) | Tom Johnson, K.G. McAbee, and Steve Mitchell | | July 8, 2008 |
| Doctor Death: The Complete Doctor Death in All-Detective | Edward P. Norris; introduction by Tom Johnson | Doctor Death | June 2, 2008 |
| Out of this World Adventures #2 (December 1950) | Joe Kubert, Gardner F. Fox, and John Guinta | Replica Editions | April 13, 2008 |
| Ravenwood: The Complete Series | Frederick C. Davis; introduction by Will Murray | | April 6, 2008 |
| Thunder Jim Wade: The Complete Series | Henry Kuttner; introduction by Will Murray | | February 1, 2008 |
| King of Fang & Claw: The Complete Pulp Magazine Adventures | Bob Byrd; introduction by Will Murray | Ka-Zar | December 31, 2007 |
| Chronology of Shadows: A Timeline of The Shadow's Exploits | Rick Lai | | December 31, 2007 |
| The Secret Agent “X” Companion | Tom Johnson and Will Murray | Secret Agent “X” | December 31, 2007 |
| Tales of Masks & Mayhem | Maxentius Andor Scarlatti, Therese Drippe, John L. French, Lance Curry, Michael A. Black, Debra Delorme, and Will Murray | | December 31, 2007 |
| The Land That Time Forgot | Edgar Rice Burroughs | | December 17, 2007 |
