= Overseas Press Club =

Nonprofit organization in New York, United States

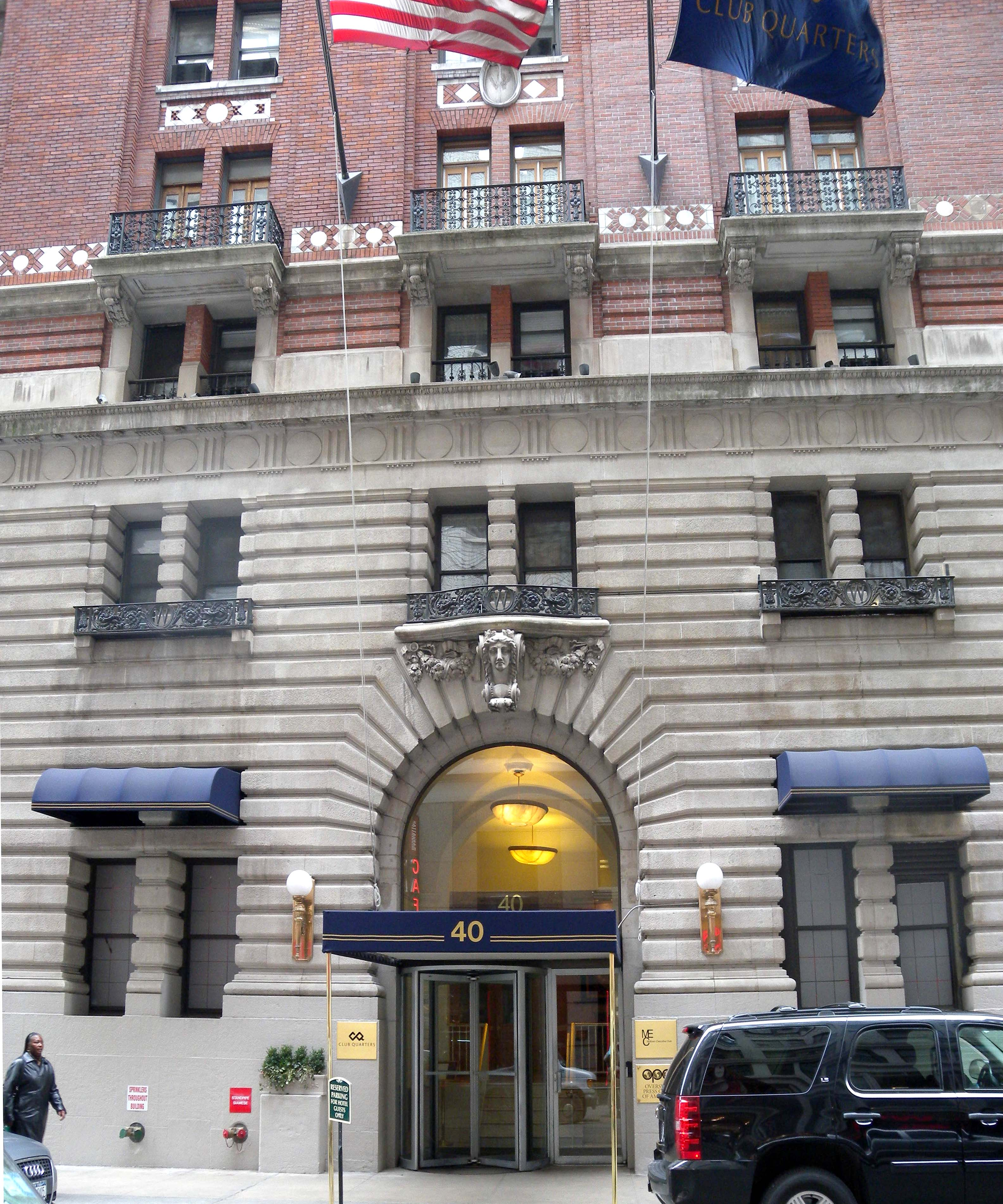
Midtown clubhouse on West 45th Street in Midtown Manhattan

The Overseas Press Club of America (OPC) was founded in 1939 in New York City by a group of foreign correspondents. The wire service reporter Carol Weld was a founding member, as was the war correspondent Peggy Hull. The club seeks to maintain an international association of journalists working in the United States and abroad, to encourage the highest standards of professional integrity and skill in the reporting of news, to help educate a new generation of journalists, to contribute to the freedom and independence of journalists and the press throughout the world, and to work toward better communication and understanding among people. The organization has approximately 500 members who are media industry leaders.

Every April, the OPC holds a dinner to award excellence in journalism for the previous year. The awards are juried by industry peers. The organization also has a foundation that distributes scholarships to college students who want to begin a career as foreign correspondents. Many winners secure international assignments at some of the most prestigious news outlets in the world.

In April 2008, the OPC relaunched its website to include community features for members like forums, commenting, page sharing through email/print/download, and RSVP and bill pay functions.

== Awards ==
As of 2017, there are 22 awards presented:

Awards Presented by the Overseas Press Club of America
Award	Given For	Year First	Last year
Lowell Thomas Award	Best radio news or interpretation of international affairs	1947	
George Polk Award	Best reporting requiring exceptional courage and enterprise abroad	1948	1973
Robert Capa Gold Medal Award	Best published photographic reporting from abroad requiring exceptional courage and enterprise	1955	
Ed Cunningham Award	Best magazine reporting from abroad	1955	
Mary Hemingway Award	Best magazine reporting from abroad. Mary Welsh Hemingway was a journalist	1955	1983
Cornelius Ryan Award	Best non-fiction book on international affairs. Cornelius Ryan was a journalist and author.	1957	
Ed Stout Award	Best reporting in any medium on Latin America	1959	1974
Ben Grauer Award	Best radio spot news from abroad	1960	1994
Thomas Nast Award	Best cartoons on international affairs	1968	
President's Award	Distinguished service in the field of journalism	1968	2009
Madeline Dane Ross Award	Best international reporting in the print medium showing a concern for the human condition	1973	
Bob Considine Award	Best newspaper or news service interpretation of international affairs	1975	
Hal Boyle Award	Best newspaper or news service reporting from abroad, after Hal Boyle	1977	
Edward R. Murrow Award	Best TV interpretation or documentary on international affairs	1978	
David Kaplan Award	Best TV spot news reporting from abroad	1980	
Olivier Rebbot Award	Best photographic reporting from abroad in magazines or books	1980	
Malcolm Forbes Award	Best business reporting from abroad in newspapers or news services	1983	
Morton Frank Award	Best business reporting from abroad in magazines	1984	
Eric & Amy Burger Award	Best international reporting in the broadcast media dealing with human rights	1984	2004
Carl Spielvogel Award	Best international reporting in the broadcast media showing a concern for the human condition	1991	
Whitman Bassow Award	Best reporting in any medium on international environmental issues	1992	
John Faber Award	Best photographic reporting from abroad in newspapers or news services	1994	
Robert Spiers Benjamin Award	Best reporting in any medium on Latin America. Robert Spiers Benjamin was a founding member of the club.	1997	
Joe & Laurie Dine Award	Best international reporting in any medium dealing with human rights	1998	
Artyom Borovik Award	Outstanding reporting by a Russian journalist who displays courage, insight, balanced yet aggressive reporting, and independence of thought	2000	2007
Feature Photography Award	Best feature photography published in any medium on an international theme	2004	
Online Journalism	Best web coverage of international affairs	2008	2009
General Excellence Online	Best overall international coverage on a web site: how the site maximizes the multimedia capabilities of the web to cover key issues, how coverage goes beyond other platforms and brings the story to its readers	2010	
Best Online Coverage of Breaking News	Best online coverage throughout a 72-hour period of a breaking news event	2010	
Best Use of Multimedia	Best use of techniques such as interactive graphics, Flash and slideshows to report on international news or developments	2010	
Best Online Investigation of an International Issue or Event	Best original or exclusive reporting for a news web site that provides new insights into an event or trend of international significance	2010	
Best Use of Video	Excellence in original video on an international topic created specifically for a news web site	2010	
Best Online Commentary (including Blogs)	Best international affairs commentary or blog	2010	

== See also ==
- Foreign Correspondents' Club
