= J. Allan Dunn =

English writer (1872–1941)

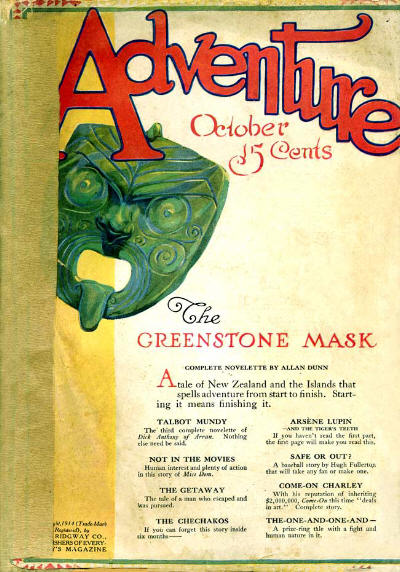
Dunn's "The Greenstone Mask" was the cover story for the October 1914 issue of Adventure

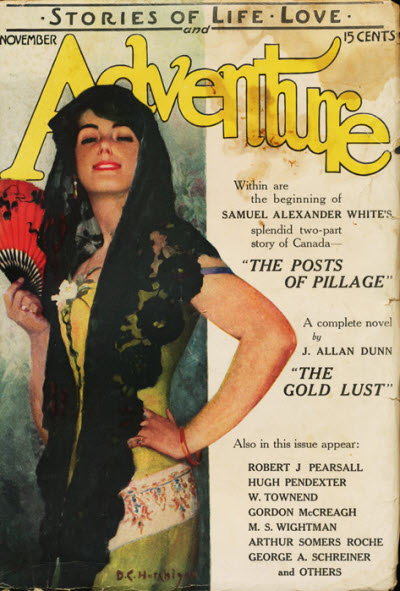
Dunn's "The Gold Lust" was cover-featured on the November 1915 issue of Adventure

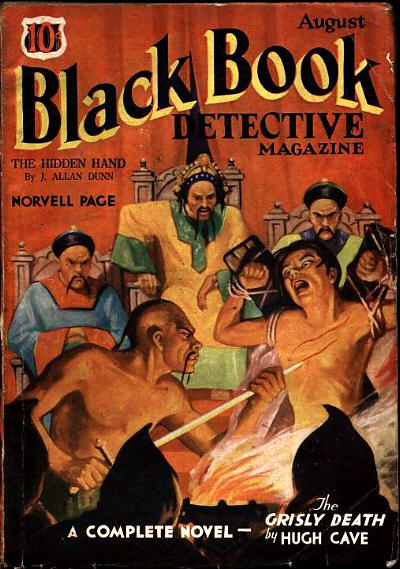
Dunn's "The Hidden Hand" was the lead short novel in the August 1934 issue of Black Book Detective

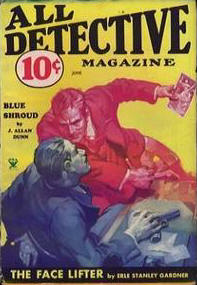
Dunn's "Blue Shroud" was the cover story for the June 1934 issue of All Detective

Joseph Allan Elphinstone Dunn (21 January 1872 – 25 March 1941), best known as J. Allan Dunn, was one of the high-producing writers of the American pulp magazines. He published well over a thousand stories, novels, and serials from 1914 to 1941. He first made a name for himself in Adventure. At the request of Adventure editor Arthur Sullivant Hoffman, Dunn wrote Barehanded Castaways, a novel about people trapped on a desert island which was intended to avoid the usual cliches of such stories. Barehanded Castaways was serialised in 1921 and was well received by Adventure's readers. Well over half of his output appeared in Street & Smith pulps, including People's, Complete Story Magazine, and Wild West Weekly. Dunn wrote over a thousand stories. He wrote approximately 470 stories for Wild West Weekly alone. His main genres were adventure and western; although he did write a number of detective stories, most of them appearing in Detective Fiction Weekly and Dime Detective. Dunn wrote The Treasure of Atlantis, a science fiction story about survivals from Atlantis living in the Brazilian jungle. The Treasure of Atlantis was published in All-Around Magazine in 1916 and later reprinted in 1970. He was a specialist in South Sea stories, and pirate stories. He also published a lot of juvenile fiction; including many stories for Boys' Life, primarily in the 1920s. A number of his novel-length stories were reprinted in hardbound, some under the pen name "Joseph Montague" for Street & Smith's Chelsea House imprint; many of his books were issued in the United Kingdom. His stories were frequently syndicated in newspapers, both in America and around the world, making him, for a time, a very widely known author.

== Biography ==
Dunn was born in England. He came to the United States in 1893. He spent about five years in Colorado, five years in Honolulu, ten years in San Francisco, and then relocated to the East Coast in 1914, after which his writing career blossomed. While living in Honolulu, Dunn befriended the writer H. D. Couzens. From 1914 forward, and in his pulp-writing career, he was known as "J. Allan Dunn"; before that he primarily went by "Allan Dunn."

While living in San Francisco, he worked for the Southern Pacific Company, which published Sunset magazine. He wrote an article for Sunset on author Jack London. The two became friends. In 1913, Dunn was a frequent visitor to London's Beauty Ranch in Glen Ellen, California. According to the diaries of Charmian London, London's second wife, she and Dunn spent a lot of time together, which prompted Jack London to reinvigorate his interest in her. In 1913, he was accused of theft after attending a weekend party elsewhere. When his premises were searched, items belonging to London and his weekend hosts were found. However, the charges were dropped due to his restitution of the items and his prior clean record.

A perennial "clubman", Dunn was a member of San Francisco's Bohemian Club. Later, he belonged to New York's Explorers Club, and, in 1937, was elected to the board of trustees. He also belonged to the Adventurers' Club of New York, eventually becoming vice-president.

Dunn died, according to friends, of complications from chronic malaria; he had contracted the disease in Honolulu.

== Bibliography ==
- Care-Free San Francisco (Southern Pacific Company; 1913)
- Boru The Story of an Irish Wolfhound (1915)
- Jim Morse, South Sea Trader (Small, Maynard & Company; 1919)
- A Man to His Mate (Bobbs-Merrill Company; 1920)
- Dead Man's Gold (Doubleday; 1920)
- Jim Morse, Gold-Hunter (Small, Maynard & Company; 1920)
- Rimrock Trail (1920)
- The Odyssey of Boru (Dodd, Mead and Company; 1924)
- The Crater of Kala [by Joseph Montague] (Chelsea House; 1925)
- Sanctuary Island [by Joseph Montague] (Chelsea House; 1927)
- Young Eagle of the Trail (Grosset & Dunlap; 1932)
- Two-Gun Sheriff (Nicholson & Watson; London, 1936)
- The Treasure of Atlantis (Centaur Press; 1970)
- Forced Luck (Black Dog Books; 2005)
- The Golden Dolphin and Other Pirate Tales from the Pulps (Wildside Press; 2005)
- Outdoor Stories (Off-Trail Publications; 2011)
- The Peril of the Pacific (Off-Trail Publications; 2011)
- Three South Seas Novels (Off-Trail Publications; 2012)
- Barehanded Castaways (Murania Press; 2012)
- The Crime Master: the complete battles of Gordon Manning & the Griffin, Volume One (Altus Press; 2014)
- The Island (Murania Press; 2015)
- Day of Doom: the complete battles of Gordon Manning & the Griffin, Volume Two (Altus Press; 2015)
- The Grip of the Griffin: the complete battles of Gordon Manning & the Griffin, Volume Three (Altus Press; 2015)
