= Harrison Forman =

American journalist (1904–1978)

- Born: June 15, 1904; Milwaukee, Wisconsin, United States
- Died: January 31, 1978 (aged 73); New York City, New York, US

Harrison Forman (June 15, 1904 – January 31, 1978) was an American photographer and journalist. He wrote for The New York Times and National Geographic. During World War II he reported from China and interviewed Mao Zedong.

== Biography ==
He graduated from the University of Wisconsin with a degree in Oriental Philosophy. Forman and his wife Sandra had a son, John, who later changed the spelling of his name to Foreman, and a daughter, Brenda-Lu Forman, who collaborated with her father on one of his books, and also wrote a series of children's books on given names.

His collection of diaries and fifty thousand photographs are now at American Geographical Society Library at University of Wisconsin–Milwaukee.

Forman who travelled to the Tibetan Plateau in 1932 and filmed the Panchen Lama at the Labrang Monastery in Xiahe, Gansu province.

Forman wrote the 1936 book, Through Forbidden Tibet: An Adventure into the Unknown.

He served as the Tibetan technical expert on Frank Capra's Lost Horizon film of 1937.

In 1943, Forman was among the foreign journalists who established the Foreign Correspondents' Association in China.

In 1944, he visited Yan'an and interviewed Chinese Communist Party leaders including Mao Zedong, Zhou Enlai, and Zhu De.

== Books ==
- 1931: Do You Want to Fly?. Shanghai: The Comacrib Press
- 1936: Through Forbidden Tibet. New York: Longmans & Co.; London: Longmans, Green
- 1942: Horizon Hunter: the adventures of a modern Marco Polo. London: Robert Hale
- 1945: Report from Red China. New York: Holt
- 1948: Changing China. New York: Crown Publishers
- 1952: How to make Money with your Camera. New York: McGraw-Hill
- 1964: The Land and People of Nigeria. Philadelphia: Lippincott (with Brenda-Lu Forman)
