= George Edmund Holt =

American journalist (1881–1950)

George Edmund Holt (February 15, 1881 – October 16, 1950) was an American journalist and author.

== Life and career ==
Holt was born in Moline, Illinois on February 15, 1881.

In Morocco, he covered the defeat and abdication of Sultan Abd-el-Aziz for the Associated Press. He also met Raisuli. He was appointed Consul-General for the United States in Morocco. He also wrote short stories for magazines such as Collier's. and contributed both fiction and non-fiction to Adventure magazine.

Holt resided in San Diego, California from 1922 until his death on October 16, 1950, at the age of 69.

== Books ==
=== Non fiction ===
- Morocco the piquant, or, Life in sunset land

=== Fiction ===
- By Favour of Allah (1926)
- The Decree of Allah (Black Dog Books, 2015)

== See also ==
- Adventurers' Club of New York
