= Robert Spiers Benjamin =

American journalist

Robert Spiers Benjamin (17 August 1917 – 20 September 2009) was a 20th-century journalist. He was a founding member of the Overseas Press Club. Following his death, the club named an award in his memory for 'Best reporting in any medium on Latin America'.

He wrote and edited several books

- The Inside Story, about the Overseas Press Club
- The Vacation Guide
- Eye Witness
- I am an American, a symposium of radio interviews with important naturalized Americans. Commissioned by the US Immigration and Naturalization Service
- Call to Adventure: True Tales of Adventures Set Down by the Men who Actually Experienced Them, 1935, an anthology for the Adventurers' Club

As a child, he was a boy scout.

== Links ==
- Obituary by the Overseas Press Club
