= John Goddard (adventurer) =

American adventurer

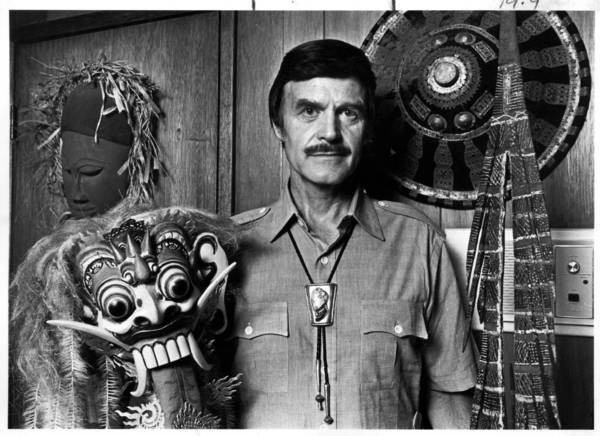
John Goddard

John Goddard (July 29, 1924 – May 17, 2013) was an American adventurer, explorer, writer, and lecturer.

== Biography ==
In 1940, when Goddard was fifteen years old, he wrote down a list of one hundred and twenty-seven goals he wanted to accomplish in his lifespan, from learning to type on a keyboard to climbing Mount Everest. "When I was fifteen," he told LIFE Magazine, "all the adults I knew seemed to complain, 'Oh, if only I'd done this or that when I was younger.' They had let life slip by them. I was sure that if I planned for it, I could have a life of excitement and fun and knowledge".

After serving in World War II with the Army Air Forces, Goddard spent the next few years traveling, and managed to join the Adventurers Club, an elite group who explored developing regions, of which he was at the time the youngest member. Goddard served as a missionary for the Church of Jesus Christ of Latter-day Saints in the Central States Mission, assigned to places such as Manitoba and Minnesota in about 1948-1950. He resumed his world traveling shortly after his mission, heading to Foggia in Italy. He began pursuing the goals on his list in earnest, and in 1951 became the first man to navigate the entire length of the Nile river in a kayak; this and subsequent adventures, such as exploring the Congo River in 1956 and climbing Mount Kilimanjaro in 1968, fueled a successful career on the lecture circuit. He was also the first person to conduct an exploration of the entire Congo River.

Starting in 1950, Goddard spent much time in Uganda and surrounding areas. He originally had a negative view towards the native medicine in Uganda, but had a complex view, both praising and condemning various aspects of the society at large. After his kayaking trip down the whole length of the Nile, Goddard studied anthropology at the University of Southern California. Over time he came to have a much more positive view of medicine men in Uganda and surrounding regions, by the 1980s declaring they had a sincere desire to help their people.

Goddard wrote two books: The Survivor (ISBN 1558746951), and Kayaks Down the Nile (ISBN 0842513655), an account of his trip from source to the mouth of the White Nile in kayaks accompanied by two French friends in 1950, and featured in Chicken Soup for the Soul. His Colorado River expedition, which included his near-fatal plane wreck at the river's source, is featured in the feature-length film Devil's Highway The Fabulous Colorado River. John Goddard died on May 17, 2013, in Southern California.
