= Selwyn Egerton Sangster =

Canadian outdoorsman and writer

Selwyn Egerton Sangster, known as Canuck, was a Canadian outdoorsman and writer. He lived from 1883 to 1966. He was a member of the North-West Mounted Police, and for years attached to the Canadian Indian Service. Sangster founded a hunting and fishing outfitting organisation in the[Height of Land region of Northern Canada.

Sangster wrote for outdoor magazines such as Hunter-Trader-Trapper.
