= Sasha Siemel =

Latvian-born American/Argentine adventurer

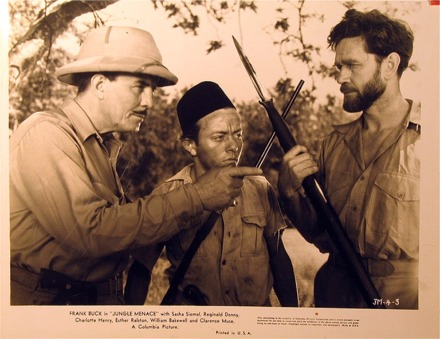
- Siemel (right) with Frank Buck (left) in the 1937 film Jungle Menace
- Born: January 25, 1890; Riga, Latvia (then part of the Russian Empire)
- Died: February 14, 1970 (aged 80); Montgomery County, Pennsylvania, U.S.
- Occupation: actor
- Years active: 1937
- Spouse: Edith Bray

Alexander "Sasha" Siemel (Latvian: Aleksandrs Žiemelis; 1890–1970) was an American/Argentinian adventurer, professional hunter, guide, actor, writer, photographer, and lecturer of Latvian origin. He spoke seven languages and boasted of having experienced more adventure in a single year than most men had witnessed in a lifetime. He is known among sportsmen, claiming to have successfully hunted more than 300 jaguars in the Mato Grosso jungles of Brazil.

Siemel's accomplishments in pursuing the large and often dangerous jaguar, the biggest cat in the Western Hemisphere and third-largest in the world, are deemed all the more impressive because on many of his hunts, he was reportedly armed only with a spear.

== Biography ==
Siemel was born in Riga, Latvia, and moved to the United States in 1907 at the age of 17. After staying in the U.S. for two years, he headed to Argentina, where he was employed in a Buenos Aires printing shop. In 1914, Siemel traveled to the jungles of Brazil, where he worked as a gunsmith and mechanic in the diamond-mining camps of the Mato Grosso. There, he met a native who taught him to become a tigrero, which is a hunter who kills jaguars armed only with a spear.

In the article "Interviewing the Tiger-Man", Siemel said, "… I learned the art from a poor native who had nothing but a home-made spear, where I had my high-powered rifle. But I do think I was a good pupil and will admit that it calls for experience and judgment." In the July 1937 issue of Ye Slyvan Archer, he wrote: "It is only logical and natural that I should (prefer the bow to the rifle). The spear is a primitive weapon, so is the bow. While I would not want to say that hunting big cats with a rifle cannot be plenty dangerous and exciting under all circumstances, particularly so in our Mato Grosso jungles, where vision is extremely limited, it seems to me that the bow complements the spear. If I now had any use for a shield besides, I should feel perfectly equipped."

With his skill as a hunter, Siemel worked on ranches of the Pantanal hunting jaguars, or onças, hired by landowners to protect their livestock. In 1925, he killed his first jaguar using a zagya, a seven-foot spear, making him the first White man to accomplish such a feat. This did not long go unnoticed by the "civilized" world. By 1931, a monograph, Green Hell, by Julian Duguid, appeared. The book recounts a 1929 trip across the Pantanal, where the author and two fellow adventurers employ Siemel as their guide. Here, Siemel is first given the moniker "Tiger Man", which went on to become the title of Duguid's 1932 biography of the hunter. Encouraged by Duguid, Siemel began to lecture at explorer clubs throughout the world. In 1937, while lecturing in Philadelphia, Siemel met Edith Bray, a young photographer, who later joined him in the Pantanal. Three years later, at the age of 47, he married Edith, and the two remained in the Pantanal and began raising a family. During this time, Siemel became an actor, appearing in the 1937 15-episode Frank Buck serial Jungle Menace as Tiger Van Dorn. The serial was compiled into a feature film in 1946, and released under the title Jungle Terror.

Sasha, Edith, and their children, Sondra, Dora, and Sasha Jr. (Sashino), moved to Sumneytown, Pennsylvania after purchasing a farm in 1947. Bom Retiro, as they named the farm, became Siemel's permanent residence for the rest of his life. Here,, the Siemels' second son, Carlie, was born in 1955, completing the family. Siemel led a quiet life, lecturing and continuing to lead expeditions to South America. He now spoke six languages: Latvian (learned in the streets in Riga), Russian (in the schools he attended as a youngster in Latvia), German (at home, his mother was German), English (in the USA), Spanish (in Argentina), and Portuguese (in Brazil).

As an author, Siemel had been writing articles for various outdoor magazines, including National Geographic. In 1949, Sasha and Edith co-wrote the book Jungle Wife, an account of family life in the jungle. He penned his autobiography, Tigrero, in 1953. It was to be made into a movie by director Samuel Fuller. Instead, Tigrero is the subject of a 1994 documentary by Mika Kaurismäki. Tigrero: A Film That Was Never Made featured Fuller and Jim Jarmusch visiting the proposed Amazon locations of the film. In 1954, Siemel's book Jungle Fury was published. (Jungle Fury is the same book as Tigrero, but retitled for the UK.)

Siemel was interviewed by journalist Charles Collingwood for the Adventure series produced by the American Museum of Natural History, and broadcast on the CBS television network in 1953. The family returned to Brazil briefly in 1959, when Sashino was 13 years old. His adventure is told in the 1965 book Sashino.

In 1963, the Sasha Siemel Museum and Store opened in Perkiomenville, Pennsylvania, in the century-old Jacob Graeff's story mill located on the Perkiomen Creek. The museum housed Siemel's collection of hunting trophies, works of art, curios, minerals, shells, coins, weapons, Indian utensils, and many other items. "Among the most interesting of the displays are Sasha Siemel's mementos of his many years of daring adventures and explorations as the only White man to hunt jaguars armed with a hand-made spear. Here are the trophies of many exciting hunts and the equipment used in hunting and capturing jaguars." The museum closed in 1969 after Siemel's last trip to the Pantanal, in which he guided a group of geologists. Sasha Siemel died in Montgomery County, Pennsylvania, in 1970 at the age of 80.

== Books ==
- Death in the Silent Places, Peter Hathaway Capstick, 1981, 288p.
- Sashino, Sasha Siemel, Jr., 1965, 165p.
- Jungle Fury, Sasha Siemel, 1954
- Tigrero!, Sasha Siemel, 1953, 266 p.
- Jungle Wife, Sasha Siemel, Edith Bray Siemel, Gordon Schendel, 1949, 308p.
- Tiger-Man: An Odyssey of Freedom, Julian Duguid, 1932
- Green Hell: Adventures in the Mysterious Jungles of Eastern Bolivia, Julian Duguid, 1931

== Magazine articles ==
- Action Caravan [v1 #1, May 1951]. "Don Marco Keeps the Peace", Sasha Siemel
- American Bowman Review [Nov. 1945]. "And Sash Potted the Cat"
- Archery [July 1946]. "Hunting Jaguar in Matto Grosso", Edith Siemel
- Archery [Aug. 1951]. "Siemels Return From Matto Grosso", Sasha Siemel
- Argosy [April 28, 1934]. "Men of Daring: Sasha Siemel, Jungle Nomad!", Allen Stockie
- Argosy [Nov. 1950]. "This One Almost Got Me", Sasha Siemel
- Argosy [Feb. 1951]. "Cannibals On Our Trail", Sasha Siemel
- Argosy [Dec. 1953]. "Bold Cat, Bold Hunter", Sasha Siemel
- Blue Book Magazine [v 60 #1, November 1934]. "Spearing a Jaguar", Sasha Siemel
- Bowhunting [Apr.1959]. "Tigrero!"
- Colliers [v 119, June 28, 1947]. "Spear That Tiger", Sasha Siemel
- Colliers [Aug. 16, 1947]. "At Home With the Jungle Giants"
- Field and Stream [May 1935]. "Hand Spearing Jaguars", Sasha Siemel
- Life [March 24, 1952]
- Life [Oct.26, 1953]. "The Death of Assassino", Sasha Siemel
- National Geographic [1952, p. 695]. "The Jungle Was My Home", Sasha Siemel
- Outdoor Life [May 1933]. "White Spearman of the Jungle", Tracey Lewis
- Outdoor Life [Feb. 1954]. Interview with Edith Siemel
- Outdoor Life [May 1967]. "Jaguar Man Returns: Sasha Siemel Hunts Again"
- Penn Museum [Nov. 2009]. "The Present Meets The Past"
- People Today [Oct.12, 1951]. "Tarzan and Family"
- Reader's Digest [Feb. 1954]
- Rocks & Minerals [March, 2000]. "Collecting Tales From Brazil," Part 2
- Safari [July/Aug. 1995]. "Sasha Siemel and the Quest for Freedom", Edward O'Brien Jr.
- Safari [July/Aug. 2002]. "The True Tigrero", Dexter K. Oliver
- The Archer's Magazine [Nov. 1952]. "Recent Activities of the Siemel Family", Jane Morrow
- The Feathered Shaft [June 1949]. "Tiger-Man", E. Johnston
- The Feathered Shaft [Dec. 1947]. "Sasha Siemel Lectures Thrill Thousands"
- Time [Apr. 21, 1930]. "Tiger-Man"
- Time [Aug. 25, 1930]. "Catching Them"
- Time [Apr. 13, 1931]. "Matto Grosso Rigors"
- Time [Oct. 5, 1931]. "Hounds v. Big Game"
- Time [Jun.1, 1931]. "Tiger-Man"
- Time [Dec. 21, 1931]. "Menu"
- Time [Sept. 8, 1952]. "The Winning of the West"
- Traditional Bowhunter [Apr/May 1998]. "Zagaya Hombre", Gene Wensel
- Ye Slyvan Archer [May 1937]. "Interviewing the Tiger-Man", George Brommers
- Ye Slyvan Archer [July 1937]. "Why I Prefer the Bow to the Rifle", Sasha Siemel

== Films ==
- Jungle Menace, 1937, 15-episode serial starring Frank Buck
- Jungle Terror, 1946
- Spear hunting jaguars; Kontiki [videorecording.] Publisher New York : American Museum of Natural History : CBS, 1953; 1 videocassette (60 min.) : sound, black and white; 3/4 in

SEGMENT 1: Spear Hunting Jaguars. Charles Collingwood, narrator of the Adventure series, interviews Sasha Siemel, a professional hunter for 35 years who makes his living spear hunting jaguars for cattle ranchers in South America. Siemel, who has lectured at the AMNH, shows films of various forms of wildlife around his home in Matto Grosso, Brazil, and also lets the viewers see his hunting activities: capturing a cub in the jungle and spearing a jaguar. (Jaguars are the largest cats in the New World.) Siemel has killed over 300 jaguars, but only 31 by spear. Siemel demonstrates in the studio the movements of a spear hunter and shows some of his own hand-made spears to the studio while discussing their construction techniques. Film Collection no. 37 Spear hunting jaguars; Kontiki [videorecording.] Publisher New York : American Museum of Natural History : CBS, 1953.

== See also ==
- List of famous big game hunters
