= Joseph C. Montague =

American politician

Joseph C. Montague served in the California legislature and during the Mexican–American War he served in the US Army.
