= Jimmy Jemail =

American football player (1893–1978)

- Born: September 12, 1893; Byblos, Ottoman Empire
- Died: July 26, 1978 (aged 84); New York, New York, U.S.
- Occupation: Writer-photographer
- Years active: 1921–1973
- Football career

Profile
- Positions: Quarterback, halfback

Personal information
- Listed height: 5 ft 6 in (1.68 m)
- Listed weight: 165 lb (75 kg)

Career information
- High school: Rogers (Newport, Rhode Island, U.S.)
- College: Brown, Navy

Career history
- New York Brickley Giants (1921)

Career statistics
- Games started: 1
- Games played: 1
- Stats at Pro Football Reference

Manuel James Jemail (September 12, 1893 – July 26, 1978) was a writer-photographer for The Daily News, a veteran of the United States Navy, and an American football player.

== Life ==
Born in Byblos, Lebanon, Jemail moved with his family to Newport, Rhode Island, when he was five years old.

He was the first American of Lebanese descent to be accepted into the U.S. Naval Academy, where he played football. After being sidelined by an injury his first year, he transferred to Brown University where he started as a quarterback and halfback and played in the 1916 Rose Bowl.

He played for the New York Brickley Giants in 1921. He is distinguished as being the first Lebanese to play in the National Football League (NFL).

Jemail served in World War I. After leaving the Navy, he found work as a security guard for The Daily News. He was made inquiring photographer just thirty minutes after being hired as a security guard, when the paper's editor "decided that any former Navy officer and Ivy League football player who would take an $8 a week job should also make a hard-nosed newsman".

Jemail started working for Sports Illustrated when it was founded in 1954. He had a weekly full page feature titled Jimmy Jemail's Hotbox where he would ask a sports question to people from both inside and outside the sporting world.

Jemail worked for The Daily News as a writer-photographer for 52 years and would interview "presidents, premiers, royalty, the rich, the famous, the ordinary and the bums". In 1962, he met President John F. Kennedy who told him "I've followed your column for years." President Richard Nixon called Jemail's column one of the most widely read in New York City. Jemail retired from The Daily News in 1973.

He died of cancer in Lenox Hill Hospital on July 26, 1978.
