= Frederick Houk Law =

Dr. Frederick Houk Law (September 7, 1871 – September 7, 1957) was an American writer and educator who taught English for many years in New York City and authored works of fiction, non-fiction, and travel writing. He served for 45 years as head of the English Department at Stuyvesant High School in Manhattan, during which time he was elected president of the High School Teachers Association of New York City, which later merged to form the United Federation of Teachers). Outside his professional career, he traveled extensively, experiences that formed the basis of several travel books.[

Besides being the author of a number of works of fact and fiction, he compiled, edited, and annotated anthologies of short stories, essays and plays. Other book-length works, some published in series, addressed academic subjects, citizenship, biography, patriotism, and speech, among other topics. Law also wrote travel articles for newspapers and magazines, and short stories for pulp fiction magazines such as Munsey's.

== Early life and education ==
Frederick Houk Law was born September 7, 1871 in New York City, the son of John Masseker Law and Jane Rachel Houk of Oxford, NY, who died when he was not yet 2 years old. After graduation from the Oxford Academy he received his A.B. from Amherst in 1895, where he was a classmate of Calvin Coolidge and Dwight W. Morrow. After receiving his M.A. from Columbia in 1896 and serving as an instructor in English and French at Centre College in Danville, Ky., he took courses in pedagogy at Brown University and was the head of the Department of English at Pawtucket, R.I., High School the following year. He served at Stuyvesant High School in Manhattan from 1898 to 1943, heading the English Department throughout that period. In 1914 he received his Ph.D. from New York University. After retiring from Stuyvesant High School, Law was for 10 years the educational director of The Reader’s Digest.

He also lectured at a number of New York area colleges and institutions. He was active in the High School Teachers Association in New York (now, after a merger, the United Federation of Teachers) and served several terms as president; and for three terms was the New York State director of the National Educational Association. He helped organize the National Secondary Education Association, which later was incorporated into the N.E.A. He was associated with Dr. Talbott Williams of the Columbia University Graduate School of Journalism in founding the first School Press Association in New York.

In 1896, soon after his graduation from Amherst, Law married Mary Kenniston Thorp; she died in 1907. The widower’s book of poetry, Ad Miriam, reflects the loss. In 1912 he married Carrie Ramsey Shields, and with son John, and new wife lived in Brooklyn. He and Carrie had four children together – in 1913 Margaret Elizabeth (Mrs. Henry H. Mills); in 1915 Janet Katharine (Mrs. Richard H. Amberg); in 1917 Frederick Houk Law Jr., who died in 1927 at age 9; and in 1921 Robert Shields Law.

Law died on his 86th birthday, Sept. 7, 1957, at his Brooklyn home (the same house he and his wife had since their marriage) and was buried in the family plot at Riverview Cemetery in Oxford, N.Y., where his parents and son Frederick Jr, were buried and where his first wife, Mary (Mar. 11, 1873 - Nov.23, 1907), and second wife, Carrie (Jan. 5, 1885-Sept. 20, 1962) also are buried.

TRAVEL

Law had a deep love of travel to exotic places from the time of his junior year at Amherst, thereafter spending every summer visiting far off destinations. Over time, beginning the summer after his junior year at Amherst in 1894 and over the next half-century or so, he explored every continent. He sneaked into what was then Constantinople and closed to Christians, disguised as an Arab trader. He ventured in 1926 on a five-month journey – variously by foot, boat, raft, bicycle, dug-out canoe, and camel—from Cape Town to Cairo when Africa was still largely untamed. He was one of the few non-natives to ford the rapids of the Mazaruin River on British Guinea, where 100 men a year were drowned. He was rescued by Muhammadan priests from a desert fanatic in Jerusalem; pursued by a street mob in Italy; attacked by a Shoshone Indian; watched as a spy in czarist Russia; held up while alone on horseback in Peru; visited various African villages during times of cholera and the Black Death, and being bitten by tsetse flies; jailed in the Argentine on suspicion of being a smuggler; arrested in Germany for being on a train without a ticket. He rode a bicycle across Europe. He was almost killed by cannibals in the Fiji Islands before performing calisthenics, which the natives found so hilarious that he was an honored guest at their dinner – and not in a Hannibal Lector way. (His account of that experience, “Cannibal Gymnastics,” was reprinted about a hundred years later in a 2003 anthology, The Rupa Book of Travellers’ Tales, published in New Delhi, India.) Dozens of other unusual places visited are listed in his books and papers. Law was president emeritus of the Adventurers Club at his death.

== Books ==
Law wrote or edited more than 40 published works. He authored two novels, four books of verse, two biographies, over a dozen travel books, and a number of books on speech and grammar. He compiled anthologies and edited a number of other books on a variety of subjects, and also wrote articles on education and travel for newspapers and magazines. The books include the following, not necessarily a complete list:

• Ad Miriam (poetry) (1909)

• A Guide to the Discussion of the D.W. Griffith Production, “Abraham Lincoln,” Starring Walter Huston

• Call to Adventure (1935) (ed.)

• Cheaper by the Dozen (1948) (ed.)

• Civilization builders (1939)

• English for Immediate Use (1923)

• English that Makes Money: A course in twenty-three books on general letter writing, sales letters, collection letters, advertising circulars…and correct punctuation for business purposes (23 volumes) (1920) (co-author)

• Great Adventures (1956)

• Great Americans (1953)

• Great Lives: Life stories of great men and women (1952)

• He Got the Job: Citizenship, work in life, personality, habits, manners, and guidance for boys and young men (1941)

• How to Write and How to Deliver an Oration (1926)

• Life with Father (1953) (ed.)

• Mastery of Speech: A course in eight parts on general speech, business talking and public speaking, what to say and how to say it under all conditions (8 volumes) (1899)

• Mastery of Speech: How to find material for talking and speaking

• Mastery of Speech: How to speak correctly and pleasingly

• Mastery of Speech: How to speak under trying conditions

• Mastery of Speech: How to speak well under all ordinary conditions

• Merrill’s English Texts: Tales and poems, by Edgar Allan Poe (introduction by Law)

• Modern Essays and Stories (1922)

• Modern Essays and Stories: A book to awaken appreciation of modern prose, and to develop ability and originality in writing (1922) (ed.)

• Modern Essays and Stories: With original illustrations

• Modern Great Americans: short biographies of twenty great Americans of modern times who won wide recognition for achievements in various types of activity (1926)

• Modern Life and Thought: A book of modern applied essays designed to stimulate original thinking and writing along lines of social and national value (1928)

• Modern Short Stories Edited with Introduction and Notes (ed.)

• Modern Short Stories: A book for high schools (1918) (ed.)

• Modern Short Stories, A Book for High Schools: Exploring the tapestry of modern storytelling (ed.)

• Modern Plays, Short and Long (1924)

• Modern Short Stories (1924)

• Modern Short Stories: A book for high schools (1918) (edited and introduction)

• Our Class Visits South America (1930)

• Reading for Skill: Practical exercises for remedial reading and library skill (1936) (co-author)

• Robert Southey’s Life of Nelson (1917) (with Robert Southey)

• Selections from American Poetry, With Special Attention to Longfellow, Whittier, Poe and Lowell (1915)

• Shakespeare’s Henry V, by Frederick Houk Law and William Shakespeare (1914)

• Sister Clementia (novel) (1910)

• Stevenson’s Treasure Island (1916)

• Stories of To-Day and Yesterday (30 selected short stories) (1930)

• Tales and Poems, by Edgar Allan Poe and Frederick Houk Law (1914)

• The Alhambra: A series of tales and sketches of the Moors and Spaniards (Academy Classics) by Washington Irving (ed.)

• The Blue Book of Effective Speech: Seven courses of study designed for self-instruction in practical speech, in daily life, in business and on public occasions including simple parliamentary law (1932)

• The Heart of Sindhra (novel) (1898)

• The Life of the World: And Other Poems (poetry) (1899)

• The Red Badge of Courage & A Connecticut Yankee in King Arthur’s Court (ed.)

• The Stream of English Poetry (1930) (ed.)

• The Story of the Other Wise Man and the Mansion, by Henry Van Dyke and Frederick Houk Law (1920)

Categories:

• Pulp fiction writers

• Schoolteachers from New York (state)

• 1871 births

• 1957 deaths

• American writers
