= Ozark Ripley =

American writer

Ozark Ripley (1872–1940), real name John Baptiste de Macelot Thompson, was an American fisherman and huntsman.

He wrote short stories for pulp fiction magazines such as Adventure.

== Books ==
- Jist Huntin': Tales of the Forest, Field and Stream
- Quail and the Quail Dog
- Modern Bait and Fly Casting
- Bass and Bass Fishing
