= Norman Schwarzkopf Sr. =

United States Army general and first superintendent of the New Jersey State Police

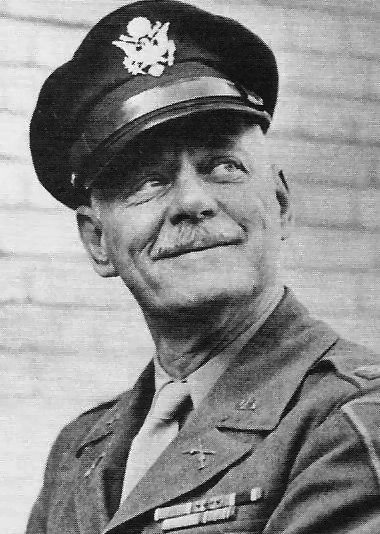
- Schwarzkopf as an Army officer
- Born: Herbert Norman Schwarzkopf; August 28, 1895; Newark, New Jersey, US
- Died: November 25, 1958 (aged 63); Mineola, New York, US
- Burial place: West Point Cemetery
- Spouse: Ruth Alice (b. 1900)
- Children: Norman; Sally; Ruth Ann
- Military career
- Allegiance: United States
- Branch: United States Army
- Service years: 1917–1920, 1926–1953
- Rank: Major General
- Commands: Commandant of School of Military Government
- Conflicts: World War I World War II
- Awards: Army Distinguished Service Medal; Purple Heart
- Other work: Superintendent of the New Jersey State Police (1921–1936)

Herbert Norman Schwarzkopf (/ˈʃwɔːrtskɒf/ SHWORTS-kof, German: [ˈʃvaʁtskɔpf]; August 28, 1895 – November 25, 1958) was the first superintendent of the New Jersey State Police. He is best known for his involvement in the Lindbergh kidnapping case. He was the father of General Norman Schwarzkopf Jr., the commander of all Coalition forces during the Gulf War in 1991.

== Early life ==
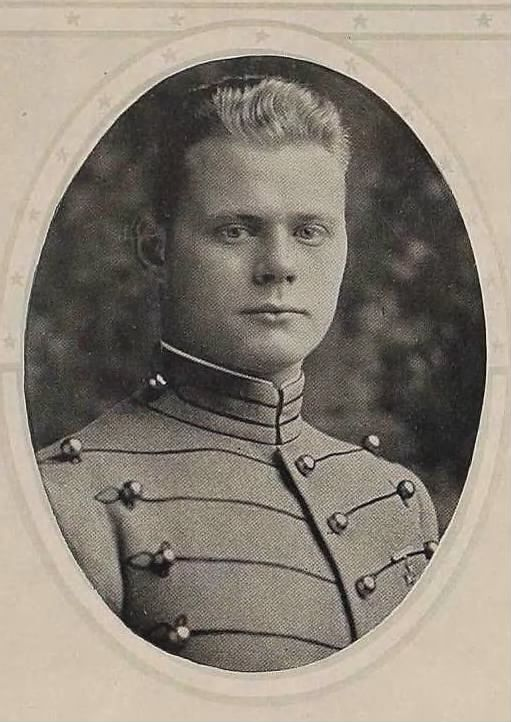
Schwarzkopf in the United States Military Academy yearbook, 1917

Schwarzkopf was born in Newark, New Jersey on August 28, 1895. He graduated from Barringer High School. He received an appointment from Walter I. McCoy to attend the United States Military Academy at West Point, graduated 88th of 139 in 1917 and served in World War I.

== Career ==
=== Military service and New Jersey State Police ===
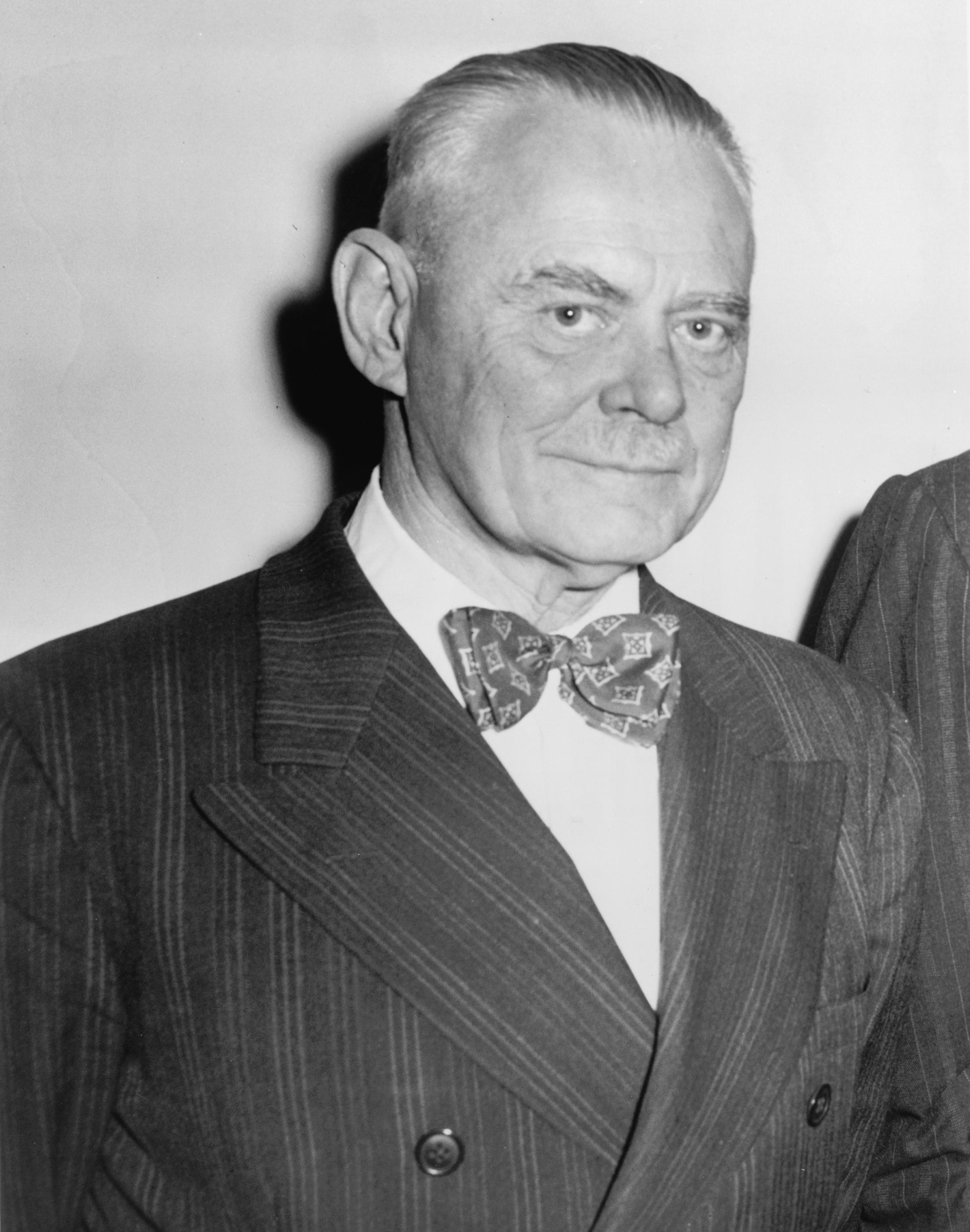
Official portrait of Col. Herbert Norman Schwarzkopf (Badge#1), 1st Superintendent of the New Jersey State Police.

After receiving a commission as a second lieutenant in the U.S. Cavalry, Schwarzkopf was sent to Europe as part of the American Expeditionary Forces. He was gassed with mustard gas, making him susceptible to respiratory illnesses for the rest of his life. During the occupation, he served as a provost marshal, partially because of his organizational skills and partially because of his fluency in German, due to his German heritage.

After returning to the United States with the rank of colonel, Schwarzkopf was appointed in 1921 by New Jersey Governor Edward I. Edwards to head the newly formed New Jersey State Police. He personally trained the first 25 state police troopers and organized the state police into two troops: a northern troop, utilizing motorcycles, to patrol the Mafia-controlled narcotics, whiskey, rum-running, and gambling rings in the New York City area; and a southern troop, with troopers on horseback, to crack down on moonshiners. On April 6, 1926, he was commissioned a lieutenant colonel in the New Jersey National Guard, being assigned to the staff of the 44th Division. He also held a commission as a major in the Organized Reserve from January 10, 1924, to May 17, 1926.

=== Lindbergh kidnapping ===
On the evening of March 1, 1932, Colonel Schwarzkopf, then 37, and the first chief of the New Jersey State Police, was among the officials called to the East Amwell residence of Charles Lindbergh, following the kidnapping of his 20-month-old son, Charlie. He arrived on the scene with his second-in-command, Major Charles Schoeffel, and established a police command post in the three-car garage on the side of Lindbergh's house opposite the nursery, but he found it impossible to protect the area from contamination.

Further complicating the investigation was that the controlling Lindbergh used his fame and influence to exert authority over matters, which meant that Schwarzkopf had to essentially work around him, despite ostensibly being in charge of the investigation, a fact for which Schwarzkopf has been criticized by experts such as FBI profiler and author John E. Douglas. Schwarzkopf requested a list of all the employees who worked on Lindbergh's house, which was constructed following Charlie's birth, as well as those who worked in the house and at Next Day Hill, the palatial Englewood estate of Lindbergh's inlaws, Dwight and Elizabeth Morrow, where the Lindberghs stayed during the week prior to the completion of their own home.

Although they stayed in the incomplete home only on weekends, they did not return to Next Day Hill by Tuesday, March 1, because Charlie was ill. Schwarzkopf believed the kidnappers were local and nonprofessional, based on their apparent familiarity with the Lindbergh house, the location of the nursery from which the infant Charlie was abducted, and the relatively modest ransom request of $50,000.

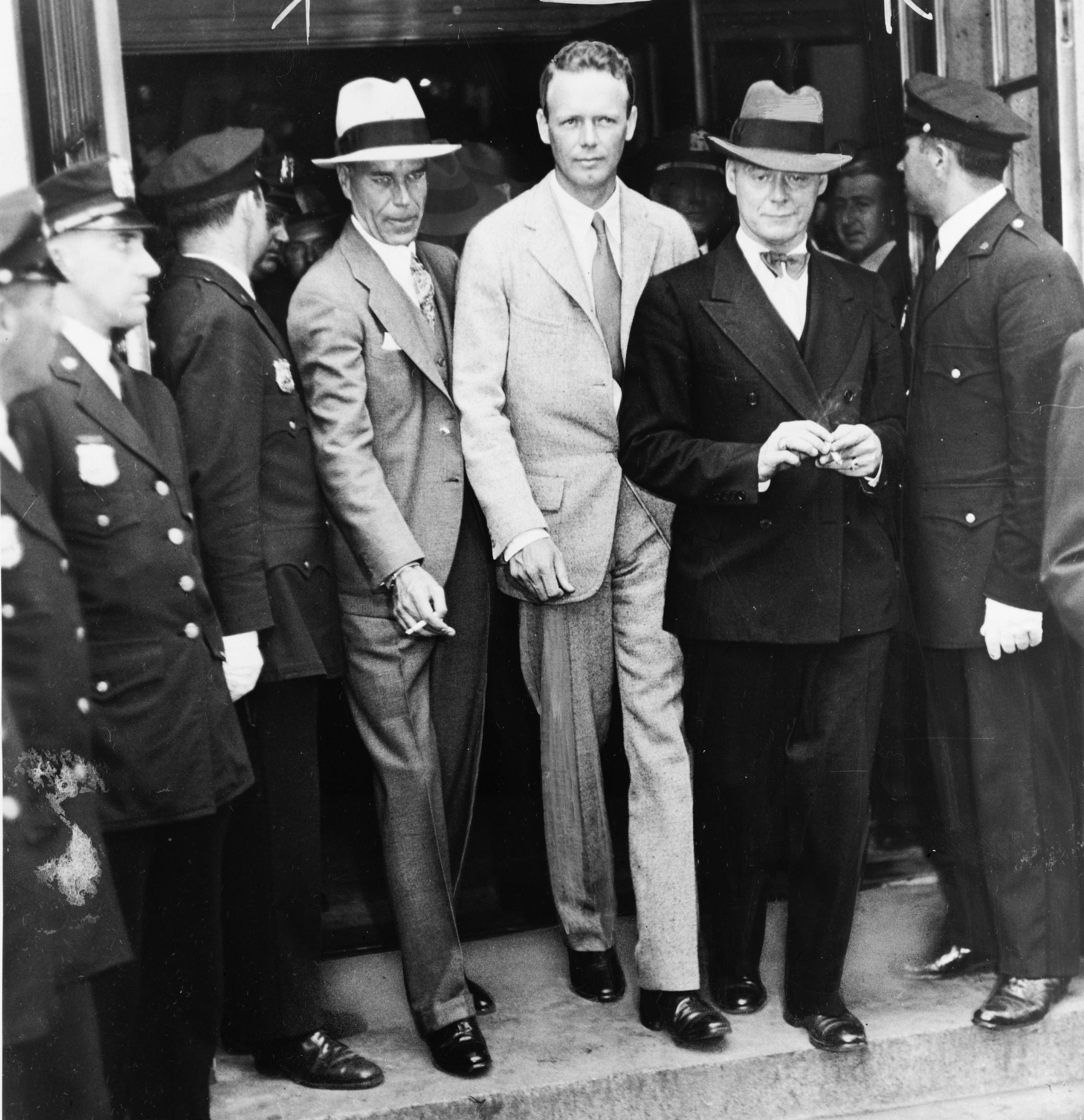
Colonel Schwarzkopf (right) with Charles Lindbergh, following grand jury testimony.

Schwarzkopf suspected gang involvement, as kidnapping was a common criminal enterprise during the Great Depression, and wanted to contact members of the underworld, but during the course of the investigation, John F. Condon, a 72-year-old retired Bronx schoolteacher, became an intermediary between Lindbergh and the kidnappers after he placed an ad in Home News, to which the kidnappers responded. Schwarzkopf wanted to place a trace on Condon's telephone, but Lindbergh overruled him, and setting up a trap would have been made difficult or impossible by Lindbergh's management of the case.

Schwarzkopf reluctantly agreed to keep law enforcement away from the arranged ransom drop. Although the man to whom Condon gave the ransom money in Saint Raymond's Cemetery in the Bronx on April 2 gave Condon a note describing a boat where Charlie could be found, no such boat was found. When Charlie's skeletonized corpse was found by a truck driver on May 12, Schwarzkopf inspected the shallow grave, four miles from the Lindbergh home, whose lights were visible from the site. Following the identification of the corpse as Charlie, and the determination from the level of decomposition that he was killed immediately after abduction, Schwarzkopf informed Charlie's nursemaid, Betty Gow, and Elizabeth Morrow, who then informed Charlie's mother, Anne Lindbergh. Charles Lindbergh's need for control over the case was now over, and by the time the case had been months old, and trails had gone cold, Schwarzkopf was the target of widespread and recurring criticism. Following the suicide of Violet Sharpe, a maid for the Morrows who had been acting suspiciously before the incident and during its investigation, some, such as Violet's sister, Emily Sharpe, accused Schwarzkopf and Jersey City Police Department investigator Harry Walsh of harassing her to death with their rough interrogations, but experts such as Douglas have disputed that notion.

To test the theory of how the baby was abducted and then killed early on, Schwarzkopf had duplicates constructed of the makeshift ladder used to climb into Charlie's second-story nursery window and the ransom letter, and reenacted the crime himself. The 165-pound Schwarzkopf carried a sandbag weighing the same as Charlie down the ladder, and when he stepped onto the highest rung of the lower portion of the wooden ladder (which, like the real one, consisted of two hinged sections and a third one attached at the crime scene), the side rail split, just like on the real ladder. Schwarzkopf dropped the bag, and it struck the cement windowsill of the library, echoing the massive skull fracture that served as Charlie's cause of death. Schwarzkopf had the written communications in evidence sent to graphologists, who concluded that they were all written by one person, most likely German in origin.

In late 1932, Schwarzkopf was contacted by New York psychiatrist Dudley D. Schoenfeld, who concluded from the kidnapper's written notes that the perpetrator was a mechanically inclined, 40-year-old German suffering from dementia paralytica, caused by a sense of powerlessness; this is now considered an impressive early example of criminal profiling. Schwarzkopf also had pieces of the ladder analyzed by wood specialist Arthur Koehler, who determined from four extra nail holes that rail sixteen of the ladder, unlike the wood used to make the rest of the ladder, had been previously used for some other purpose. Koehler presumed that the kidnapper ran out of lumber and cannibalized whatever wood was on hand for that rail, explaining the disparity. Koehler concluded on November 19, 1933, that side rails twelve to fifteen came from the National Lumber and Millwork Company in the Bronx.

Investigation of bills from the ransom money that turned up in circulation led to the September 19, 1934, arrest of Bruno Hauptmann, a 35-year-old German skilled carpenter who once worked at National Lumber and Millwork, which was ten blocks from Hauptmann's residence. By matching grain patterns and nail holes, Koehler determined that rail sixteen had been removed from Hauptmann's attic, which was missing a floorboard, and featured nail holes in four successive joints, where it would have been hammered down. Hauptmann was tried and convicted for murder and was executed on April 3, 1936.

=== Later military service ===
In the year of 1936, Schwarzkopf was dismissed from the New Jersey State Police after a personality clash with Governor Harold G. Hoffman. For a short time, he narrated the radio program Gang Busters (he can be heard in the March 28, 1941, episode The Case of the Nickel and Dime Bandits) before he returned to active duty in the US Army with the onset of World War II.

Schwarzkopf was inducted into federal service with the 44th Division in September 1940, briefly commanding the 57th Infantry Brigade in 1941 before being posted to Iran in 1942 through the efforts of Mohammad Vali Mirza Farman Farmaian and assigned to organize the Iranian national police after the British-Soviet intervention that made Iran an Allied protectorate. His recruits, the Gendarmerie, were active in suppressing the Soviet-inspired attempt to destabilize Iran by backing separatists in Azerbaijan and Mahabad. For his work in Iran, Schwarzkopf was awarded the Distinguished Service Medal.

After World War II, he was promoted to brigadier general and in the late 1940s was sent to occupied Germany to serve as provost marshal for the entire US sector.

Before retiring from the Army in 1953 with the rank of major general, Schwarzkopf was sent by the Central Intelligence Agency as part of Operation Ajax (correct name TPAjax, TP meaning Soviet-backed Tudeh Party of Iran), to convince the self-exiled Iranian monarch, Mohammad Reza Shah, to return and seize power. Schwarzkopf went so far as to organize the security forces he had trained to support the Shah, and in so doing, he helped to train what later became known as the SAVAK.

Schwarzkopf was appointed by New Jersey Governor Robert B. Meyner to "examine and investigate the management by Harold G. Hoffman," a former governor of the state and director of the division of employment security. Both Schwarzkopf and Hoffman were active members of the Adventurers' Club of New York.

=== Death ===
Major General Schwarzkopf died on November 26, 1958 at his home in West Orange, New Jersey of a perforated ulcer. His body was cremated at Rosedale Cemetery in Orange, with his ashes buried at the United States Military Academy's West Point Cemetery in West Point, New York.

== Personal life ==
Schwarzkopf was married to Ruth Alice (née Bowman) (1900–1976), a registered nurse from West Virginia. Ruth was a housewife who was distantly related to Thomas Jefferson. Together, they had one son, Norman Schwarzkopf Jr., and two daughters, Sally and RuthAnn.

Schwarzkopf was a Freemason. He was a member of St. John's Lodge #1 of Free and Accepted Masons, Newark, New Jersey, where he was raised to the Sublime Degree of Master Mason.

== Military awards ==

Army Distinguished Service Medal
| Purple Heart | World War I Victory Medal with four service stars | Army of Occupation of Germany Medal |
| American Defense Service Medal | American Campaign Medal | European-African-Middle Eastern Campaign Medal with four service stars |
| World War II Victory Medal | Army of Occupation Medal with "Germany" clasp | National Defense Service Medal |

== See also ==
- Adventurers' Club of New York
- German American
