= Frederic Franklyn Van de Water =

American journalist

Frederic Franklyn Van de Water (1890–1968) was an American journalist and writer. He was an honorary sergeant in the New York State Troopers. In 1924, he travelled in the West Indies investigated and reported about rum pirates and Chinese smugglers.

He wrote for Harper's Magazine.

He wrote short stories for pulp fiction magazines such as Collier's.

In the 1949 historical novel The Green Cockade (also published as Catch a Falling Star) Van de Water described the complicated history of Vermont during the American War of Independence - with Ethan Allen and his brother Ira Allen waging in effect a double war of independence, both sharing in the common struggle against the British but also struggling to keep Vermont independent against the annexation efforts of New York State.

He was the son of Virginia Terhune and Frederic F. Van de Water Sr.

== Bibliography ==
Some books written by Van de Water are:

- Glory-hunter; a life of General Custer, 1934
- Rudyard Kipling's Vermont feud (On the relations of R. Kipling and Beatty Balestier), 1937
- Horsemen of the law, 1926
- Wings of the Morning", 1955
- The Real McCoy, 1933
- A Home in the Country, 1947
- The Family Flivvers to Frisco, 1927
