= Lejaren Hiller Sr. =

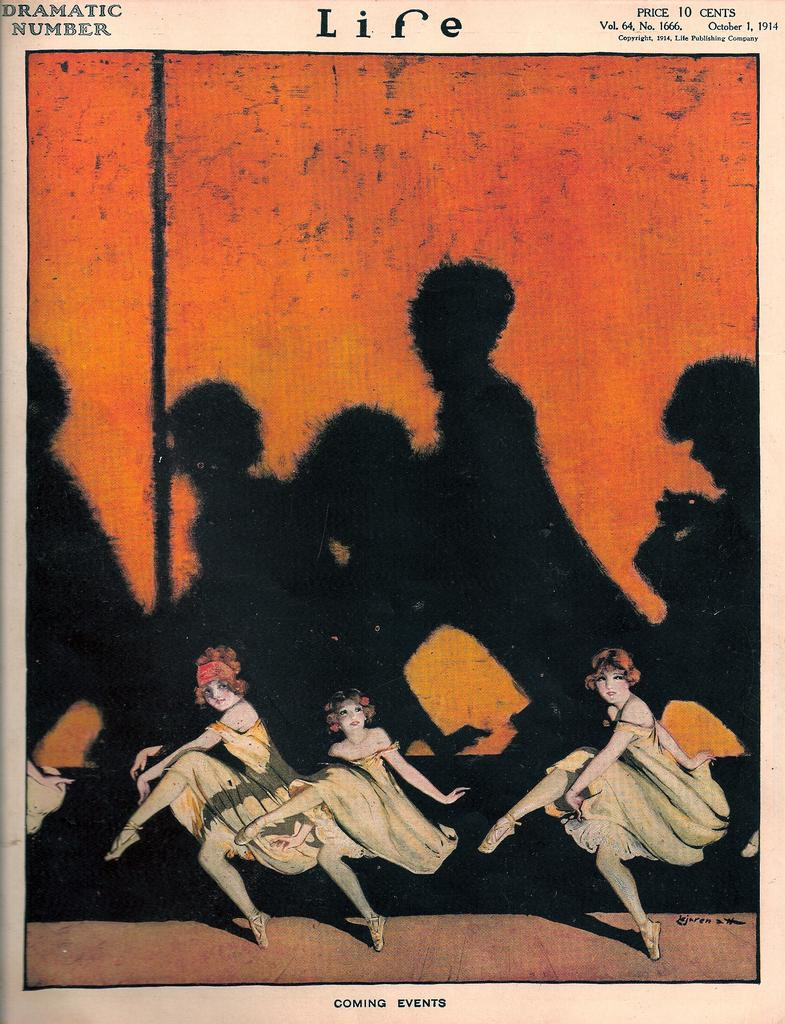
Life magazine cover of 1 October 1914

Lejaren Hiller Sr. / Lejaren à Hiller / John Hiller (3 July 1880 – 23 May 1969) was an American illustrator and photographer.

== Biography ==
Born as John Hiller in Milwaukee, Wisconsin, he changed his name to Lejaren à Hiller when he moved from New York City. He studied painting and illustration at the Chicago Art Institute and travelled to Paris where he found work in a number of studios. By the early 1900s his attention turned to photography and he was widely regarded as the "creator of American photographic illustration".

Hiller was known for dramatically staged tableaux. He would spend considerable time and effort in arranging the set and models, while an assistant took the photograph, making Hiller's contribution more directorial than photographic. He was more interested in the final result than the means used to achieve it.

From 1927-50 Hiller was commissioned by Davis & Geck to produce the prints for a series of historic advertisements entitled “Sutures in Ancient Surgery,” and published in 1944 as “Surgery through the Ages”. Hiller used elaborate costumes, dramatic backdrops and lighting, and had half-clad models posing as patients. The images depicted a broad range from mediaeval and Aztec surgeons, to surgeons from ancient Egypt and India. The collection was widely acclaimed, and in 1937 won the Edward Bok Award for advertising. The originals of this series were donated to the Art Institute of Chicago.

Hiller also created a series of photographic posters for the US Armed Forces during World War II.

His son, also named Lejaren Hiller (1924 – 1994), was a chemist of psychedelic drugs such as mescaline and celebrated music composer who pioneered the use of computers in composing.

== Partial filmography ==
- The Beggar Maid (1921)
