= Seymour Gates Pond =

Seymour Gates Pond (1896–1976) was an American adventurer and writer. He was navigating officer on the USS Savannah (AS-8) during the First World War and later an officer in the British Royal Flying Corps.

He traveled in South America in 1928. He led two scientific expeditions to South America. He also traveled in North Africa, with the French and Spanish legions.

== Writing ==
He wrote at least fifty short stories for pulp magazines such as Air Trails.

=== Non-fiction ===
He also wrote non-fiction, mostly biographies.

- The History and Romance of Exploration Told with Pictures
- True Adventures of Pirates
- Ferdinand Magellan: Master Mariner
- African Explorer: The Adventures of Carl Akeley
