= H. D. Couzens =

American writer

- Born: Henry De Clifford Couzens; 1872
- Died: April 20, 1914 (aged 41–42); Phoenix, Arizona, U.S.
- Occupation(s): Internal Revenue Service agent, writer
- Known for: Adventure stories
- Notable work: Brethren of the Beach
- Spouse: Virginia Lucas (m. 1909)
- Children: 1

Henry De Clifford Couzens (Note: Contemporary newspaper reports of his death in 1914 gave his name as Harry D. Couzens.) (1872 – April 20, 1914) was an American writer.

== Biography ==
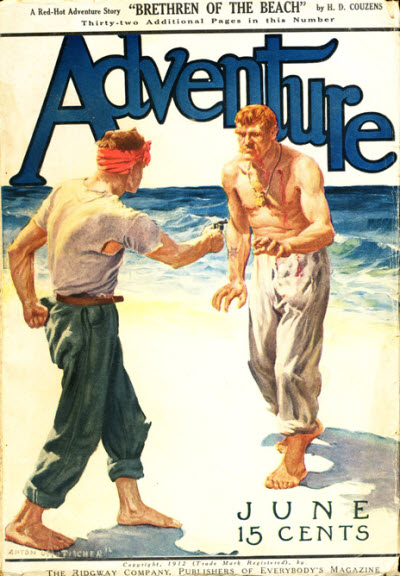
Couzens's "Brethren of the Beach" was the cover story in the June 1912 issue of Adventure

Couzens was born in Virginia. One of his grandfathers was Matthew K. Couzens, a New York State Engineer.

Couzens was living in New York in 1886, then relocated to Hawaii, where he lived for four years. During this time, he met Robert Louis Stevenson. Couzens then spent time in New York and Paris studying art, becoming a painter. He then returned to Hawaii and became Chief Deputy in the region's Internal Revenue Service. While in Hawaii, he became a friend of Jack London. Couzens moved to San Francisco in 1907.

Couzens first published a story in Outing magazine in 1894. He then began to contribute material to the slick magazine Sunset. Couzens also began to have his stories of nautical life regularly appear in pulp magazines such as Adventure and Railroad Man's Magazine. His 1912 novella "Brethren of the Beach" was later expanded into a novel; the expanded version was published in Adventure, and also in Cassell's Magazine in the UK. Brethren of the Beach was later published as a hardback book.

Couzens was a member of the Adventurers' Club of New York. He died of tuberculosis in Phoenix, Arizona, in April 1914. He was survived by his wife, Virginia, and his three-year-old son, Robert Knight Couzens. Virginia Couzens (née Lucas) was a granddaughter of Robert Lucas, first governor of the Iowa Territory. The Couzens' marriage license was issued on April 14, 1909, in San Francisco when both were aged 38. Virginia Couzens died in January 1940.
