= Gordon MacCreagh =

Gordon MacCreagh (1889 in Perth, Indiana – 1953) was an American writer.

MacCreagh was the son of Scottish parents, possibly born in Perth, Indiana in 1889 while his father, an anthropologist, was visiting the United States to study Native Americans. However, according to MacCreagh's biography - Indiana MacCreagh (ISBN 978-1-78955-500-4) by Roderick Heather, it is much more likely that he was born and educated in Scotland and later studied in Paris and Germany. Mistakenly believing he had killed a fellow student in a German sabre duel, he fled to Southeast Asia, where he lived for several years. MacCreagh worked in Calcutta, Darjeeling, the Malay Islands, Tibet, China and Burma, where he collected animal specimens. He then travelled to Africa where he captured wild animals for British and US zoos. MacCreagh arrived in New York in 1911, where he later began to write fiction. He wrote several short adventure stories for magazines such as Argosy, Adventure and Short Stories. He travelled in South America on the Mulford Expedition. His book White Waters and Black published 1926 is an account of the expedition.

He also travelled to Abyssinia with his wife in 1927, on an expedition to locate the Ark of the Covenant. His account was serialised in Adventure and published as a book The Last of Free Africa. After the book's publication, MacCreagh was made a "Knight of the Empire" by Emperor Haile Selassie. He revisited Ethiopia several times and became a friend of Haile Selassie. MacCreagh served as a US Navy pilot in World War I and volunteered for special service for the US and British armed forces in World War II.

Science fiction historian Richard Bleiler has suggested that MacCreagh was an inspiration for the fictional character of Indiana Jones.

MacCreagh died in Florida in 1953 of abdominal cancer.

== Works ==
=== Non-fiction ===
==== Travel books ====
- White Waters and Black (The Century Co.,1926)
- The Last of Free Africa (The Century Co., 1928; 2nd edition 1935)

=== Other ===
- "Adventure and a moral". Written for Call for Adventure edited by Robert Spiers Benjamin

=== Novels ===
- The Inca's Ransom (Chelsea House, 1926, reprinted from Adventure)
- Poisonous Mist (Chelsea House, 1927, reprinted from Adventure)
- Dr Muncing, Exorcist (Chelsea House)

=== Short stories ===
- Jungle Business (1925).
- The Adventures of Jehannum Smith. Black Dog Books, 2013.
- The Lost End of Nowhere: The Complete Tales of Kingi Bwana, Volume 1. Altus Press, 2014.
- Unprofitable Ivory: The Complete Tales of Kingi Bwana, Volume 2. Altus Press, 2014.
- Black Drums Talking: The Complete Tales of Kingi Bwana, Volume 3. Altus Press, 2014.
- Blood and Steel: The Complete Tales of Kingi Bwana, Volume 4. Altus Press, 2014.

147 short stories in pulp magazines Adventure (magazine), Short Stories, Strange Tales of Mystery and Terror, Argosy.
