= Sing Sing Nights =

Sing Sing Nights may refer to:

- Sing Sing Nights (novel), a 1928 novel by American author Harry Stephen Keeler
- Sing Sing Nights (film), a 1934 American film based on the novel and directed by Lewis D. Collins
