= Ramble House =

American book publisher

- Founded: 1999
- Founder: Fender Tucker & Jim Weiler
- Country of origin: United States
- Key people: Fender Tucker; Richard A. Lupoff; John Pelan; Gavin L. O'Keefe; Chase Griffin
- Publication types: Books
- Fiction genres: crime fiction, true crime, detective fiction, supernatural fiction, supernatural thriller, horror fiction, occult detective fiction, science fiction
- Imprints: Surinam Turtle Press (Richard A. Lupoff) & Dancing Tuatara Press (John Pelan)
- Official website: www.ramblehouse.com

Ramble House is a small American publisher founded by Fender Tucker and Jim Weiler in 1999. The press specializes in reprints of long-neglected and rare crime fiction novels, modern crime fiction, 'weird menace' and 'shudder pulps' short story collections from rare pulp magazines, scholarly works by noted authors on the crime fiction genre, and a range of other books of a collectible or curious nature. In addition to its main publishing arm, Ramble House has two imprints: Surinam Turtle Press and Dancing Tuatara Press, headed by authors Richard A. Lupoff and John Pelan, respectively, both of whom are now deceased.

Ramble House titles were originally handmade by Tucker in small, craft editions, but growth in the publisher's list, together with print-on-demand technology, led to the titles becoming available online as trade paperback editions. Gavin L. O’Keefe has served as cover designer for over 25 years, creating many original designs for the books or adapting existing artwork. He is also an occasional commissioning editor for the line. Psychedelic fiction author Chase Griffin joined the team in late 2025 as Loon Funhouse Operator.

== Harry Stephen Keeler and crime fiction ==
The publisher began with the mission of bringing every novel written by Harry Stephen Keeler into print; these were mostly reprinted, though a number were rescued from unpublished typescripts and published for the first time. Tucker initially used a computer and homemade bookbinding equipment to reprint 24 of Keeler's novels. The press later published new works of scholarship devoted to Harry Stephen Keeler and Edward D. Wood Jr., as well as titles focusing on the crime fiction genre authored by Anthony Boucher, Francis M. Nevins, and Jon L. Breen.

Other titles have focused on true crime, including Bill Johnson's Satan’s Den Exposed and a collection of contemporary newspaper accounts of the Jack the Ripper murders, as well as American historical figures, such as The Amorous Intrigues & Adventures of Aaron Burr and Diary and Journal of John Surratt, Conspirator.

== Other authors ==
Other authors published by Ramble House include:

- Max Afford
- Marcel Allain
- Herbert Asbury
- L. Frank Baum
- Norman Berrow
- Wyatt Blassingame
- Robert Campbell Bragg ("The N.R. De Mexico Novels")
- John G. Brandon
- Jon L. Breen
- Damien Broderick
- J. W. Brodie-Innes
- George Bruce
- Gelett Burgess
- Arthur J. Burks
- Miles Burton
- Paul Busson
- Carol Carr
- Lewis Carroll (aka Charles Lutwidge Dodgson)
- Hugh B. Cave
- Irvin S. Cobb
- Phillip Condé
- James Corbett
- Harle Oren Cummins
- Donald Dale (aka Mary Dale Buckner)
- Roland Daniel
- Rex Dark
- Grania Davis
- Weed Dickinson
- John Douglas
- Arlton Eadie
- Federick G. Eberhard
- Evelyn Elder
- Bruce Elliott
- Philip José Farmer
- Adams Farr
- Richard B. Gamon
- Mort Gerberg
- John S. Glasby
- Richard E. Goddard
- Ed Gorman
- Russell Gray
- H. B. Gregory
- Mark Hansom
- Ronald S. L. Harding
- Jim Harmon
- Clare Winger Harris
- David Hayes ("Muddled Mind: Complete Works of Edward D. Wood, Jr.")
- Ernest G. Henham
- Morris Hershman
- Fox B. Holden
- David Hume
- Wallace Irwin
- Francis James
- Malcolm Jameson
- Maurice C. Johnson
- Day Keene
- David H. Keller
- Coulson Kernahan
- John H. Knox
- Michael Kurland
- Maurice Leblanc
- Dion LeClerq
- Robert H. Leitfred
- Frank Belknap Long
- E. C. R. Lorac
- Gary Lovisi
- Richard A. Lupoff
- Jack Mann (aka E. Charles Vivian)
- Virgil Markham
- Walter S. Masterman
- C. C. MacApp
- Johnston McCulley
- L. T. Meade & Robert Eustace
- Sean M'Guire
- Chris Mikul
- J. M. A. Mills
- Cary Moran
- Jack Moskovitz
- Francis M. Nevins
- Douglas Newton
- Richard O'Brien
- Harvey O’Higgins
- Elliott O'Donnell
- Nicholas Olde
- Milton K. Ozaki
- Rupert Penny
- Bill Pronzini & Barry N. Malzberg
- E. R. Punshon
- Garnett Radcliffe
- Robert J. Randisi
- James Reasoner
- Mack Reynolds
- Tod Robbins
- Joel Townsley Rogers
- Wayne Rogers
- Sax Rohmer
- R. R. Ryan
- Robert O. Saber (aka Milton K. Ozaki)
- Nat Schachner
- Joseph Shallit
- M. P. Shiel
- Ralston Shields
- Evelyn E. Smith
- Edmund Snell
- Barnard Stacey
- Jimmy Starr
- John Stephen Strange
- Hake Talbot
- William F. Temple
- William Tevelein
- Tiffany Thayer
- Eugene Thomas
- Ralph Trevor
- Dave van Arnam & Ted White
- George Sylvester Viereck
- Manly Wade Wellman
- Basil Wells
- Carolyn Wells
- H. G. Wells
- Edward Lucas White
- Ennis Willie
- Cecil M. Wills
- Herbert Emerson Wilson
- Richard Wilson
- Jack Woodford
- Cornell Woolrich
- Ernest Vincent Wright ("Gadsby")
- Wade Wright
- Chelsea Quinn Yarbro
- Robert F. Young
- Arthur Leo Zagat
