= Minnie Devereaux =

Native American actress (c. 1869 – 1923)

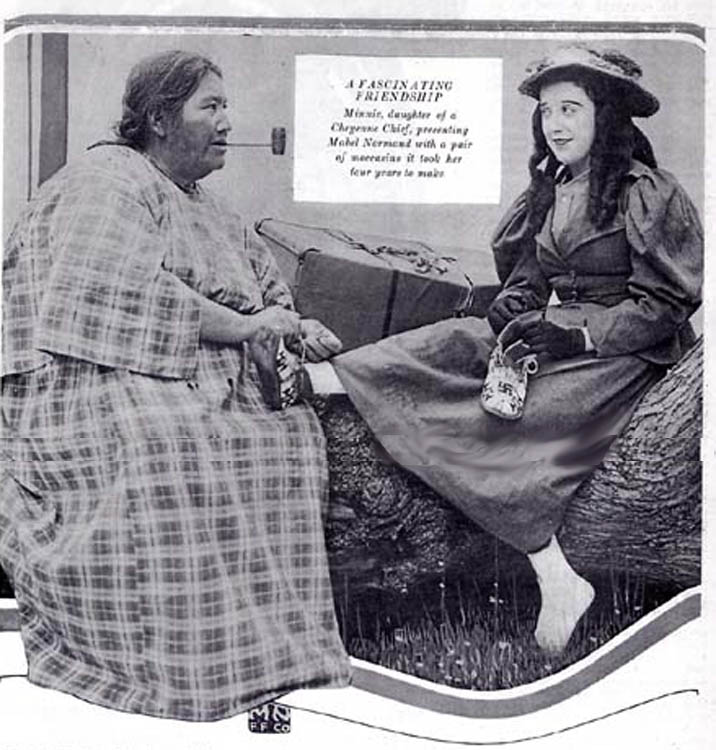
- Devereaux and Mabel Normand on cover of Mack Sennett Weekly, 1917
- Born: c. 1869; South Canadian, Choctaw Nation, Indian Territory
- Died: June 5, 1923 (aged 53–54); Los Angeles, California, U.S.
- Other names: Minnie Provost; Minerva Burgess; Minnie Ha-ha; Indian Minnie
- Citizenship: Cheyenne and Arapaho Tribes
- Occupation: Actress
- Years active: 1913–1923

Minnie Devereaux (c. 1869–1923) was a Native American silent film actress. She was a citizen of the Cheyenne and Arapaho Tribes in Oklahoma. More commonly known as Minnie Provost and occasionally "Indian Minnie", or "Minnie Ha-Ha", she held at least 14 roles, beginning in 1913 with Old Mammy’s Secret Code and ending with the 1923 release of The Girl of the Golden West. A few sources say she was a Cheyenne and the daughter of a Chief Plenty Horses. However, her father is often confused with Plenty Horses who was Lakota and born the same year as Minnie. In a 1917 interview published in the Mack Sennett Weekly Provost states that she was born to Cheyenne parents who fled G. A. Custer's Army during the Battle of the Little Bighorn, an event that took place when she was eight years old.

== Early life ==
Provost was born in the Choctaw Nation in a small town called South Canadian (now Canadian, Oklahoma). Movie trade magazines claimed she studied at the Carlisle Indian Industrial School, a Pennsylvania boarding school for Native American students, and she appears on the Carlisle rolls as Minerva Burgess of Cheyenne and Arapaho heritage. Her father is listed as "Plenty of Horses", not to be confused with Plenty Horses.

== Early career ==
=== Fatty and Minnie He-Haw ===
The actress starred alongside Roscoe Arbuckle in the 1914 silent comedy film Fatty and Minnie He-Haw, directed by Arbuckle. She is featured as a Native American, whom Arbuckle reluctantly marries after being rescued by her tribe. Arbuckle pursues a white woman in town, played by his real-life wife Minta Durfee, but is driven back when He-Haw discovers his disloyalty. Outraged, the tribe prepares to burn him for his traitorous behavior, but He-Haw spares him in an act of love. He-Haw chases her man but ultimately loses him when he disappears into the hills with angry warriors trailing behind.

=== Other works ===
Provost worked with producer and "king of comedy" Mack Sennett on Fatty and Minnie He-Haw, as well as the 1918 film Mickey and the 1922 film Suzanna, both directed by F. Richard Jones. In 1920 Minnie worked with director James Cruze on Food for Scandal, the cinematic version of Paul Kester's play A Picture of Rare Delight. Provost was an actress in demand, working with various production companies on the east coast, including Kay-Bee Pictures, the New York Motion Picture Company, and Sennett's Keystone Studios.

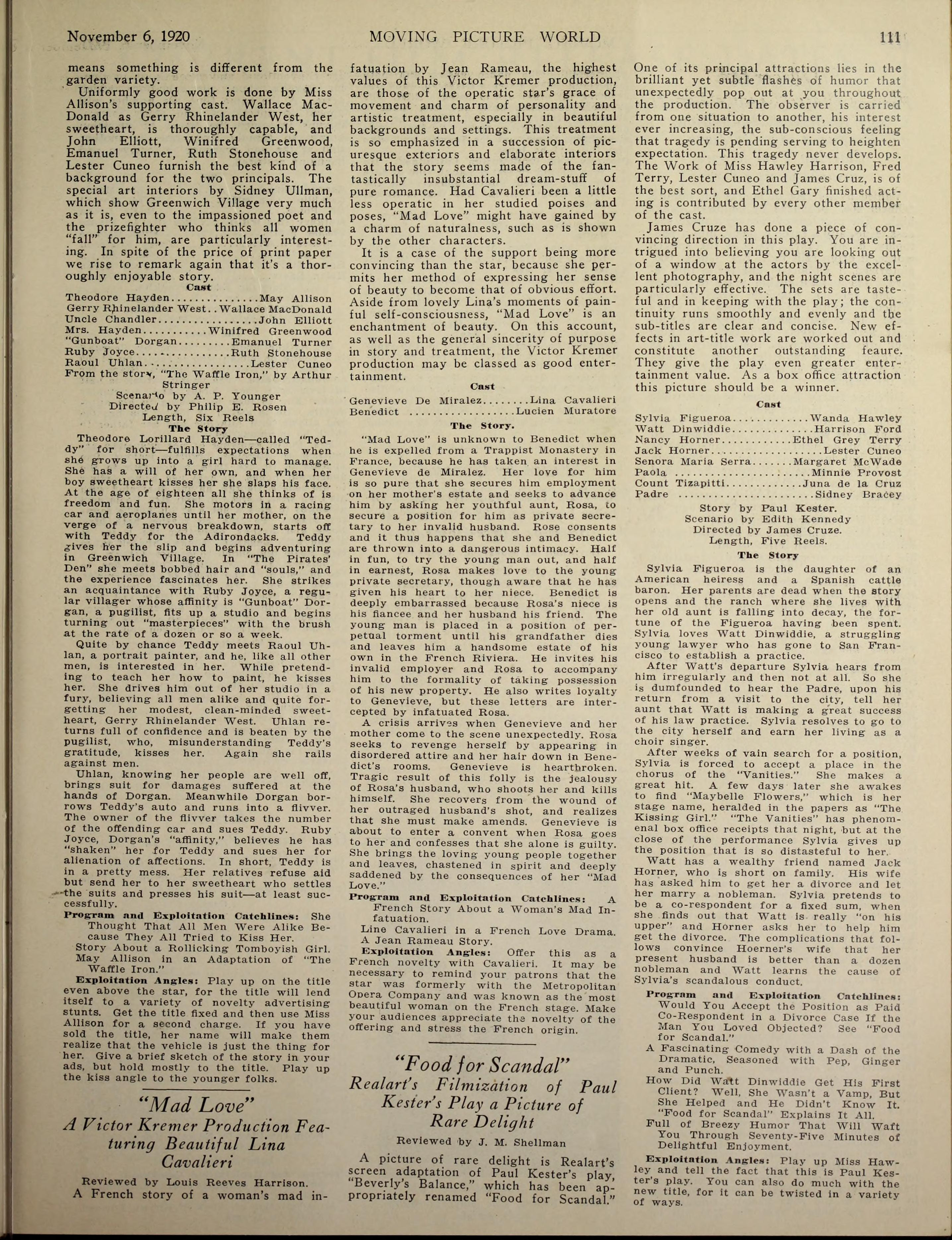
Food for Scandal (1920) review in Moving Picture World

== Reputation ==
The actress was considered a professional, who could easily perform slapstick comedy as well as melodrama.

She was subject to typecasting, with roles that capitalized upon her heavy frame and her Native American heritage. Reviews at the time often referred to Indian women as a squaw in reference to her characters' titles within such films. Peter Milne, a film critic and eventual screenwriter, berated Provost for her age and appearance, calling her "ancient" in his review of Mickey; she was only 49 years old at the time of the film's release.

In an article in Photoplay Provost recalled an encounter between her and a belligerent white woman. On a crowded street car, the woman intentionally took up available space in order to prevent Provost from sitting nearby. Provost interrupted the conductor of the street car, who insisted that the woman move her belongings. The woman replied saying that she would rather stand than sit next to such a woman.

Despite this unease, many in the film business were aware of, and respected Provost's wit, dignity, and talents as an actress. Motion Picture Magazine recounts a chance encounter between Provost and actor Bertram Grassby, who commented on the actress' persona:

During the conversation, the name of Minnie, a fat, old Indian woman who has almost become a moving picture institution, was mentioned and he commented laughingly on her way of always saying and doing the unexpected.

— Beth Trepel, "A Dryadic Dramatist", Motion Picture Magazine

The encounter involved Grassby tipping his hat toward Provost, which prompted her to question the meaning of the act. She often poked fun at other actors and directors during the production of a film.

== Filmography ==
Year	Film	Role	Notes
1913	Old Mammy's Secret Code		Credited as Minnie Prevost; Lost film
1914	Fatty and Minnie He-Haw	Minnie He-Haw	
1915	The Coward	Mammy	
1918	Mickey	Minnie	Credited as Minnie Ha Ha
1919	A Daughter of the Wolf	Mrs. Beavertail	Lost film
1919	Rose of the West	Natoosh	Credited as Minna Prevost; Lost film
1920	Up in Mary's Attic	Herself	Credited as Minnie Ha Ha; Lost film
1920	'If Only' Jim	Squaw	Lost film
1920	Food for Scandal	Paola	Credited as Minnie Provost; Lost film
1921	A Ridin' Romeo	Squaw	Lost film
1921	By Right of Birth		Credited as Minnie Prevost
1923	The Girl of the Golden West	The Squaw	Lost film
1923	Suzanna	Herself	Credited as Indian Minnie; Incomplete film
