= Charles Beadle =

British writer

- Born: Charles Beadle; October 27, 1881 at sea
- Died: January 27, 1957 (aged 75); Nice, France
- Occupations: author of pulp-magazine adventure stories, and novels of bohemian Paris
- Known for: extensive travels through eastern and northern Africa

Charles Beadle was a novelist and pulp fiction writer, best known for his adventure stories in American pulp magazines, and for his novels of the bohemian life in Paris.

He was born at sea. His father, Henry Beadle, was a ship captain, and traveled with his wife Isabelle. Charles grew up in Hackney, in greater London, attending various boarding schools. He left home as a teenager to travel. He served in the British South Africa Police in Southern Rhodesia, doing duty in the Boer War. After the war he traveled up East Africa. He was in Morocco from 1908 to 1910 or early 1911, and began his writing career.

His first known published work was an article, "Our Trip Down the Zambezi," in The Wide World Magazine (May 1907). His first known published fiction was the novel The City of Shadows: A Romance of Morocco (1911). He sailed to New York City, arriving on November 14, 1916. He established himself as a pulp adventure writer, publishing authentic stories of Africa for Adventure, Argosy, Short Stories, The Frontier, etc. He also wrote sea stories.

His most successful work was probably Witch-Doctors, a four-part serial in Adventure (issues of March 15 to May 1, 1919). It was published as a book in 1922, both in the U.S. and London.

By 1920, he was living in Paris, which appears to have been his residence for most of the rest of his life. He published at least one book, The Esquimau of Montparnasse, on the bohemian scene in Paris.

He evidently returned to England circa 1939, possibly due to the war, as Charles Beadle, novelist, born Oct 27, 1881, is registered as residing at Homewood, Hazel Road, St Albans, Hertfordshire, England in the 1939 Register of England and Wales, which was conducted on 29 September 1939.

His last known published fiction was "Nameless Spy," a ten-page story in Short Stories (June 10, 1947). His last known published work of any kind was a letter to the editor of the Continental Daily Mail (Paris), October 6, 1948. He spent his final years in Nice, France, dying on January 27, 1957.

== Books ==
- The City of Shadows: A Romance of Morocco (Everett & Co.: London, 1911)
- A Whiteman's Burden (S. Swift & Co.: London, 1912)
- A Passionate Pilgrimage (Heath, Cranton & Ouseley: London, 1915; reprinted Dominantstar, 2024)
- Witch-Doctors (Jonathan Cape: London, 1922; Houghton Mifflin: Boston, 1922)
- The Blue Rib, etc. (P. Allan & Co.: London, 1927)
- The Esquimau of Montparnasse (John Hamilton: London, 1928)
- Expatriates at Large (Macauley Company: New York, 1930)
- The White Gambit (Palais-Royal Press: Paris, 1933)
- Dark Refuge (Obelisk Press: Paris, 1938)
- Artist Quarter by "Charles Douglas" (with Douglas Goldring) (Faber & Faber: London, 1941)
- The City of Baal (Off-Trail Publications, 2007)
- The Land of Ophir (Off-Trail Publications, 2012)
- Dark Refuge (Dominantstar, 2024) [contains up-to-date bio]
- A Whiteman's Burden (Dominantstar, 2025) [contains up-to-date bio]
- The Lost Cure (Dominantstar, 2025) [contains up-to-date bio]

== Selected nonfiction ==
- "Our Trip Down the Zambezi," The Wide World Magazine, May 1907.
- "A Talk With the New Sultan of Morocco," The Pall Mall Magazine, October 1908.
- "My Narrow Escape From a Lioness," Brooklyn Eagle, August 7, 1910.
- "Russian mind" (letter), Continental Daily Mail (Paris), October 6, 1948.

== Selected pulp-magazine stories ==
- "The Christman," Adventure, May 15, 1918.
- "Through Rabat's Eyes" (3-part serial), Argosy, August 2,9,16, 1919.
- "The Alabaster Goddess," Adventure, January 1, 1920.
- "Buried Gods," Adventure, September 3, 1921.
- "The Land of Ophir" (3-part serial), Adventure, March 10,20,30, 1922.
- "The Lost Cure," Adventure, January 30, 1923.
- "The Blond Spiders," Adventure, December 20, 1924.
- "The Mark of the Leopard," Short Stories, May 10, 1926.
