= Short Stories (magazine) =

American pulp magazine published from 1890–1959

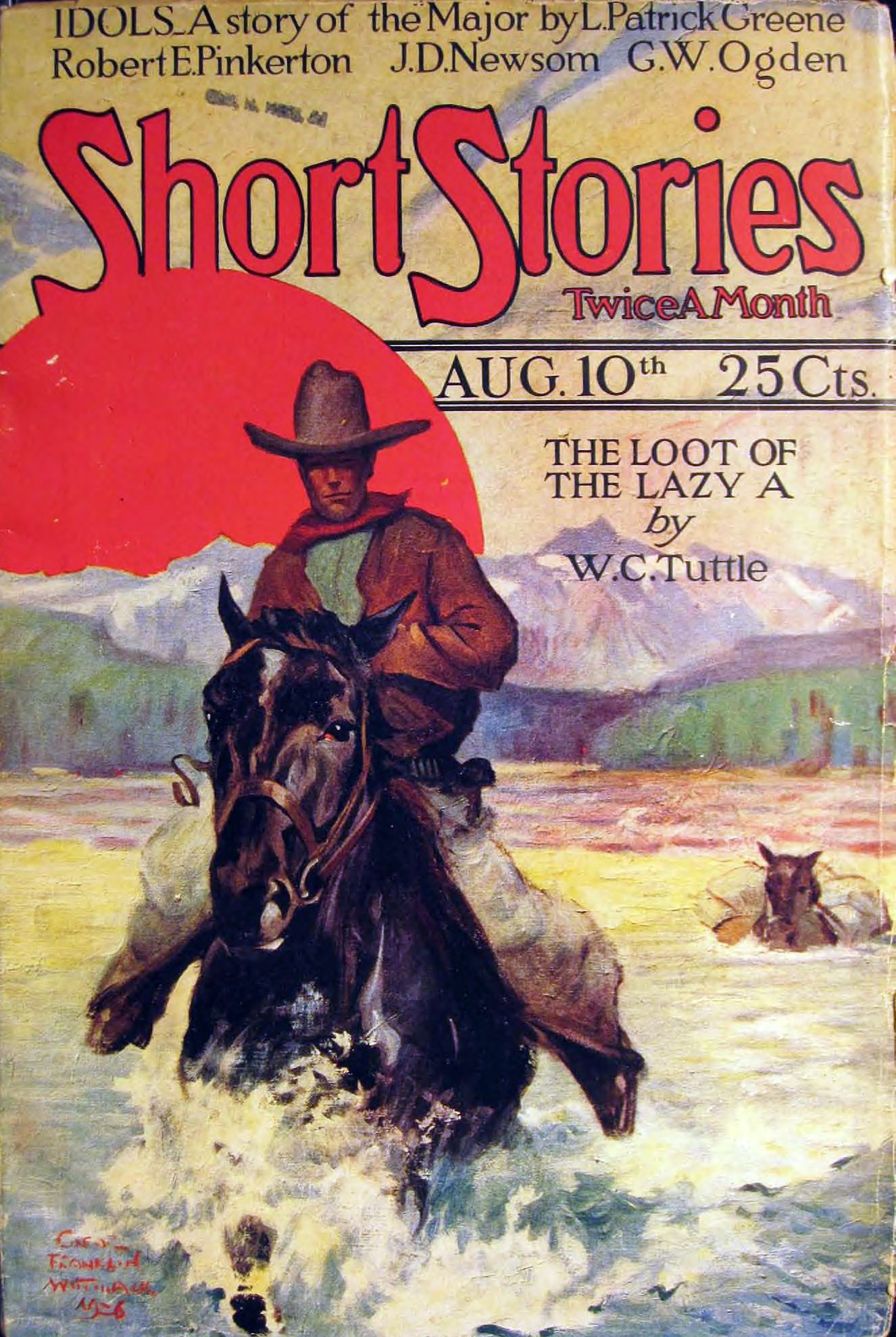
- Categories: Pulp magazine
- Frequency: Semi-monthly
- First issue: 1890
- Final issue: 1959
- Country: United States
- Language: English

Short Stories was an American fiction magazine published between 1890 and 1959.

== Origin of Short Stories ==
Short Stories began its existence as a literary periodical, carrying work by Rudyard Kipling, Émile Zola, Bret Harte, Ivan Turgenev and Anna Katharine Green. The magazine advertised itself with the slogan "Twenty-Five Stories for Twenty-Five Cents". After a few years, Short Stories became dominated by reprinted fiction. The magazine was sold in 1904 and eventually purchased by Doubleday, Page and Company, which in 1910 transformed Short Stories into a "quality pulp". The magazine's new editor, Harry E. Maule (1886-1971) placed an emphasis on Short Stories carrying well-written fiction; pulp magazine historian Robert Sampson states "For Short Stories, like Adventure and Blue Book to follow, rose above the expedient prose of rival magazines like ivory towers thrusting up from swampland". By 1916, Maule's Short Stories was selling 95,000 copies a month.

Short Stories was initially known for publishing crime fiction by authors including Max Pemberton, Thomas W. Hanshew and Hugh Pendexter.

== Pulp era ==
In the 1920s and 1930s, however, Short Stories was best known as a publisher of Western stories, with many of the best-known Western fiction writers such as Clarence E. Mulford, Max Brand, Luke Short, Ernest Haycox, W. C. Tuttle, James B. Hendryx, Barry Scobee, Bertrand William Sinclair and B. M. Bower appearing in its pages. Short Stories also carried adventure fiction, such as "Northern" tales set in the Yukon, and adventures in the South Seas or Sub-Saharan Africa. The magazine's writers in the adventure genre included George Allan England, H. Bedford-Jones, Gordon MacCreagh, J. Allan Dunn, L. Patrick Greene (stories set in Africa), William Wirt (who chronicled the exploits of a mercenary, Jimmie Cordie), and George F. Worts and Captain Frederick Moore (who wrote about South Sea adventures). Thriller writers Edgar Wallace, Sax Rohmer and Dornford Yates had stories in the magazine in this period, as did Vincent Starrett, who wrote about private investigator Jimmie Lavender for Short Stories. Albert Richard Wetjen contributed sea stories to the magazine. Short Stories also published a large number of adventure stories featuring the Foreign Legion. The magazine's practitioners in this sub-genre included J.D. Newsom (with humorous stories about Legionnaires Mike Curialo and Albert Withers), Georges Surdez, Robert Carse and Bob Du Soe. Some of the serials published in Short Stories were later published in hardback by Doubleday. These included Jimmie Dale and the Blue Envelope Murder, by Frank L. Packard.

The magazine adopted the symbol of a red sun on its covers; nearly all the issues of the pulp-era Short Stories featured a red sun as part of its cover illustration. Circulation for Short Stories rose to 174,899 copies in 1922.

In addition to fiction, Maule also created "The Story Teller's Circle", a forum for readers to write in and discuss issues (similar to "The Camp-Fire" department in Adventure magazine). Edgar Franklin Wittmack, Remington Schuyler and Nick Eggenhofer all painted several covers for Short Stories.

Maule edited the magazine for almost two decades. Between 1929 and 1932 Roy De S. Horn served as editor; Maule returned as editor in 1932. During his tenure, De Horn created "Adventurers All", a column where writers and readers of Short Stories related true-life adventures they had experienced. In 1936, Maule was succeeded in the role of editor by Dorothy McIlwraith. The next year, Doubleday sold the publication to a new owner, Short Stories, Inc. (McIlwraith would also edit Weird Tales when Short Stories, Inc. purchased that magazine). During the 1940s, writers such as Frank Gruber, Arthur O. Friel, Theodore Roscoe and Carl Jacobi appeared in Short Stories.

A British edition of Short Stories was published between 1920 and 1959; it merged with the UK version of the West magazine in 1954 and was known as Short Stories Incorporating West. The September 1950 issue of Short Stories carried Robert A. Heinlein's story Destination Moon, an adaptation of the film. This was unusual as Short Stories rarely published science fiction.

== Decline ==
Like other pulps, the advent of World War II, and the arrival of paperbacks and television had a negative effect on Short Stories; circulation figures plummeted and by the 1950s the magazine was dominated by reprints. Despite the efforts of new editor M.D. Gregory and his associate editor, Frank Belknap Long, Short Stories ceased publication in 1959. It had become a men's adventure magazine in 1957.

== Reprints ==
Single author/team collections from Short Stories:

- Bedford-Jones, H. The Beginning of Air Mail (Steeger Books, 2018).
- Bedford-Jones, H. The Devil's Bosun (Steeger Books, 2015).
- Bedford-Jones, H. Gimlet-Eye Gunn (Steeger Books, 2016).
- Bedford-Jones, H. Our Far-Flung Battle Line (Steeger Books, 2017).
- Bedford-Jones, H. The Second Mate (Fiction House Press, 2020).
- Cook, Berton E. The Collection of Harden Bayle (Steeger Books, 2017).
- Faust, Frederick. The Cross Brand (Steeger Books, 2018).
- Haycox, Ernest. Gun Talk (Popular Library, 1956).
- Hendryx, James B. Strange Doings on Halfaday Creek (Steeger Books, 2017).
- Hendryx, James B. Murder on Halfaday Creek (Steeger Books, 2019).
- Pendexter, Hugh. The Shorthorn Kid: And Other Tales of the Old West (Black Dog Books, 2014).
- Pendexter, Hugh. The Voice of the Night: The Cases of Jeff Fanchon, Inquirer (Black Dog Books, 2015).
- Worts, George F. The Blue Fire Pearl - The Complete Adventures of Singapore Sammy, Volume One (Steeger Books, 2017).
