= Lewis Greene =

Lewis Greene may refer to:

- Lewis Joel Greene (born 1934), American Brazilian biochemist
- Lewis Patrick Greene (1891–1971), English writer of adventure stories
