= A Daughter of the Wolf =

1919 film by Irvin Willat

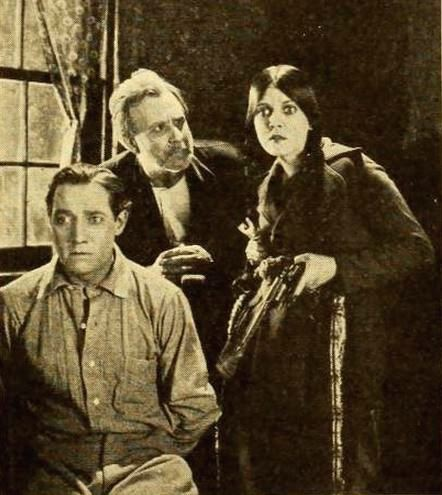
- Film still
- Directed by: Irvin Willat
- Screenplay by: Marion Fairfax; Hugh Pendexter
- Produced by: Jesse L. Lasky
- Starring: Lila Lee; Elliott Dexter; Clarence Geldart; Raymond Hatton; Richard Wayne; Minnie Devereaux
- Cinematography: J.O. Taylor
- Production company: Famous Players–Lasky Corporation
- Distributed by: Paramount Pictures
- Release date: June 22, 1919
- Running time: 50 minutes
- Country: United States
- Language: Silent (English intertitles)

A Daughter of the Wolf is a 1919 American silent drama film directed by Irvin Willat and written by Marion Fairfax and Hugh Pendexter. The film stars Lila Lee, Elliott Dexter, Clarence Geldart, Raymond Hatton, Richard Wayne, and Minnie Devereaux. The film was released on June 22, 1919, by Paramount Pictures.

== Plot ==
A fur smuggler's daughter asks to accompany him on his trip to the US to sell his furs.

She falls for Robert, a young man who has recently been dumped by his girlfriend for a rich man. She and Robert fall in love, but her father suddenly takes her back to Canada to avoid tax agents.

Robert searches for her for a year, and when he finally finds her, he must fight both her father and her father's gang for her.

Complications ensue.

== Cast ==
- Lila Lee as Annette Ainsworth
- Elliott Dexter as Robert Draly
- Clarence Geldart as "Wolf" Ainsworth
- Raymond Hatton as Doc
- Richard Wayne as Sgt. Tim Roper
- Minnie Devereaux as Mrs. Beavertail
- James "Jim" Mason as Roe
- Jack Herbert as Jacques
- Marcia Manon as Jean Burroughs
- James Neill as Judge Burroughs
- Clyde Benson as M. Pomgret
- Roy Diem as Clerk
- Charles Ogle as Doc

== Reception ==
Variety's review was middling, despite the "corking fights," the reviewer found it difficult to tell the characters apart "As soon as the girls and boys in them get on their leggins, their fur coats, their hats, their mufflers and their ear muffs they all look alike."
