= South Sea Love (1927 film) =

1927 film

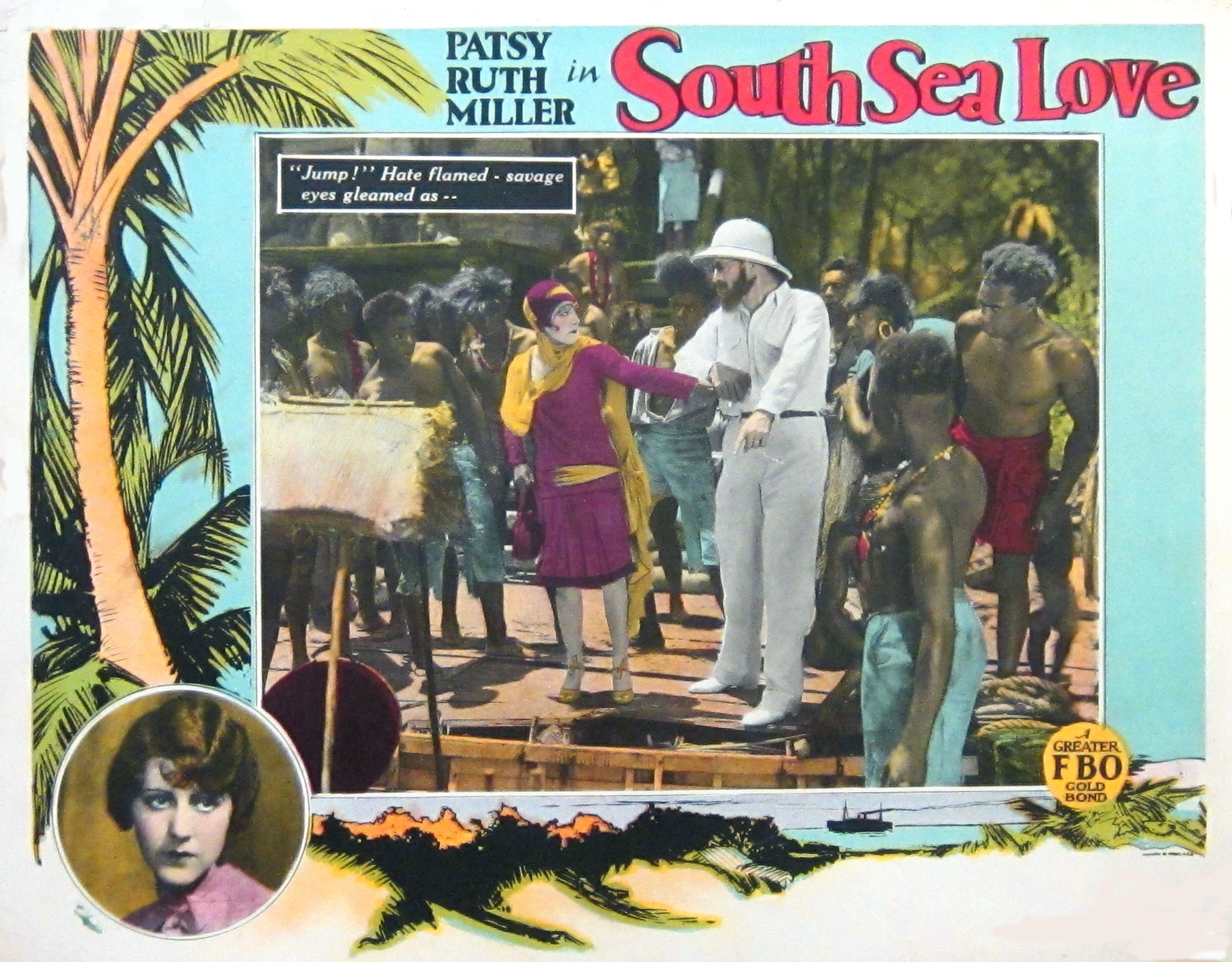
- Lobby card
- Directed by: Ralph Ince
- Written by: George M. Arthur; Enid Hibbard; Georges Arthur Surdez
- Starring: Patsy Ruth Miller; Lee Shumway; Alan Brooks
- Cinematography: Nicholas Musuraca
- Edited by: George M. Arthur
- Production company: Robertson-Cole Pictures Corporation
- Distributed by: Film Booking Offices of America
- Release date: December 10, 1927
- Running time: 7 reels
- Country: United States
- Language: Silent (English intertitles)

South Sea Love is a 1927 American silent drama film directed by Ralph Ince and starring Patsy Ruth Miller, Lee Shumway, and Alan Brooks.

== Cast ==
- Patsy Ruth Miller as Charlotte Guest
- Lee Shumway as Fred Stewart
- Alan Brooks as Tom Malloy
- Harry Crocker as Bob Bernard
- Barney Gilmore as George Billways
- Gertrude Howard as Moana
- Albert Conti as Max Weber
- Everett Brown as Nahalo
- Harry Wallace as Jake Streeter

== Production ==
Exteriors for South Sea Love were filmed on location at Santa Ana Canyon.

== Bibliography ==
- Quinlan, David. The Illustrated Guide to Film Directors. Batsford, 1983.
