= Suzanna (film) =

1923 film by F. Richard Jones

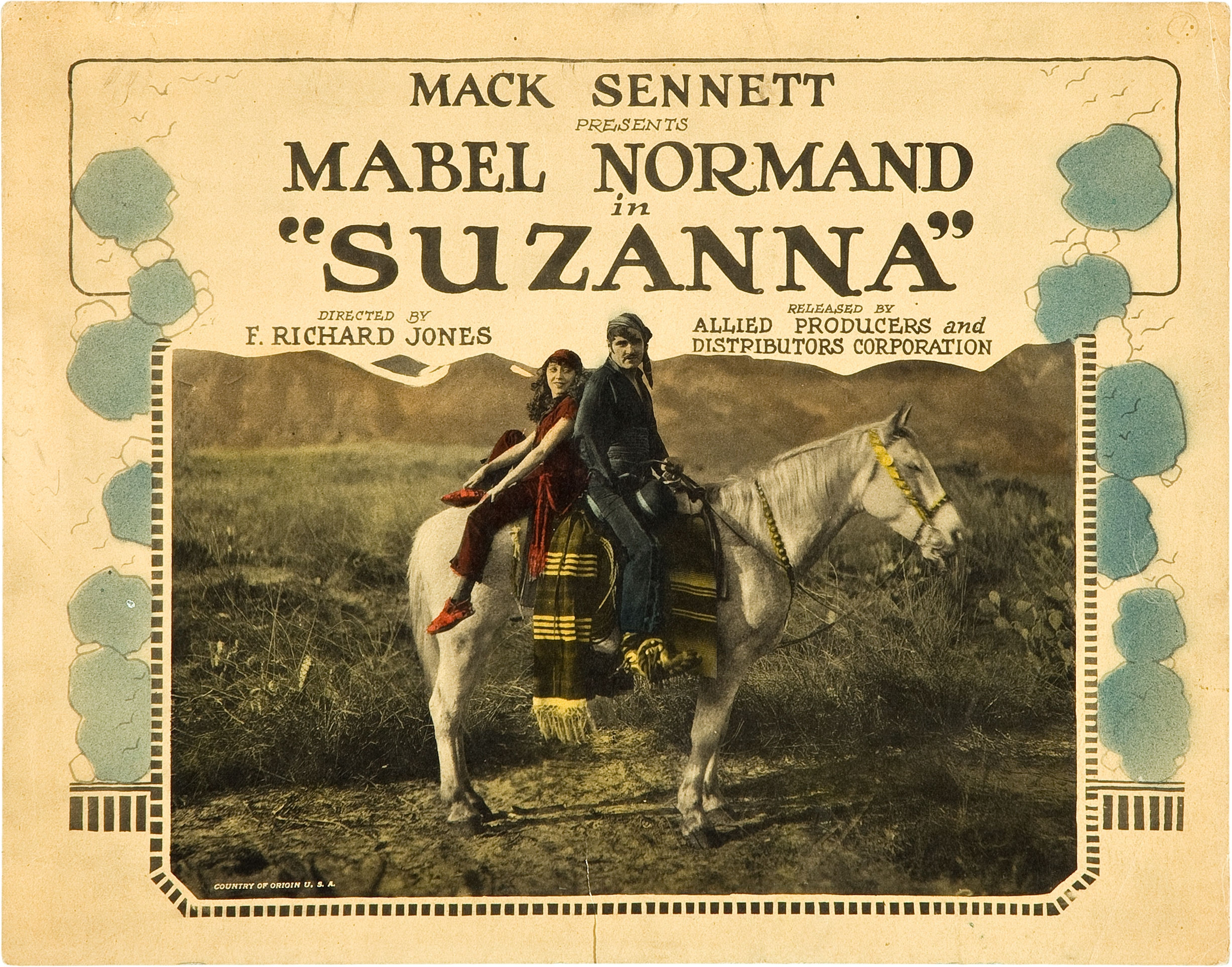
- Original lobby card
- Directed by: F. Richard Jones
- Written by: Mack Sennett (adaptation)
- Story by: Linton Wells
- Produced by: Mack Sennett
- Starring: Mabel Normand
- Cinematography: Fred W. Jackman; Homer Scott; Robert Walters
- Edited by: Allen McNeil
- Music by: Bert Lewis
- Distributed by: Allied Producers & Distributors Corporation
- Release date: February 26, 1923 (United States)
- Running time: 80 minutes
- Country: United States
- Language: Silent (English intertitles)

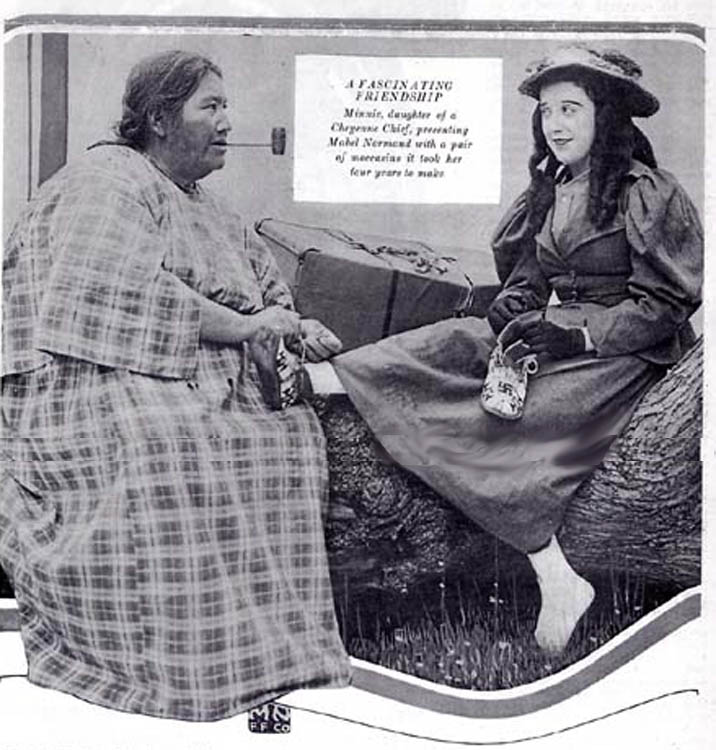
Minnie Devereaux and Mabel Normand in 1917

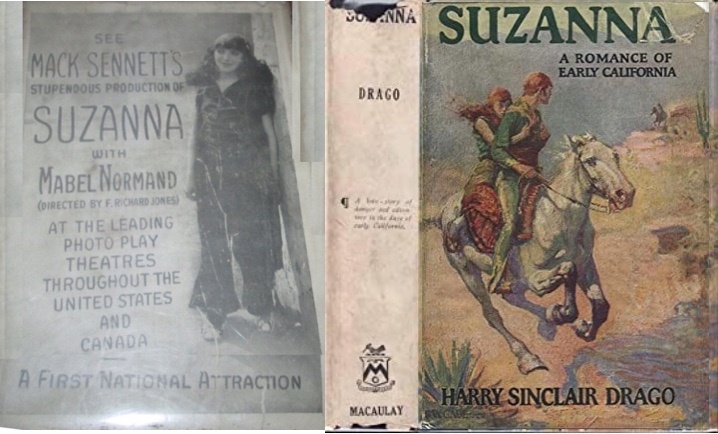
Harry Sinclair Drago - Suzanna

Suzanna is a 1923 American silent comedy-drama film starring Mabel Normand and directed F. Richard Jones. The picture was produced by Mack Sennett, who also adapted the screenplay from a story by Linton Wells. A partial copy of the film, which is missing two reels, is in a European archive.

The cinematographers were Fred W. Jackman, Homer Scott, and Robert Walters, and the supporting cast features George Nichols, Walter McGrail, Léon Bary, Winifred Bryson, and Minnie Devereaux. The composer was Bert Lewis.

Full film

== Cast ==
- Mabel Normand as Suzanna
- George Nichols as Don Fernando
- Walter McGrail as Ramón
- Evelyn Sherman as Doña Isabella
- Léon Bary as Pancho (as Leon Bary)
- Eric Mayne as Don Diego
- Winifred Bryson as Dolores
- Carl Stockdale as Ruiz
- Lon Poff as Álvarez
- George Cooper as Miguel
- Minnie Devereaux as herself
- Black Hawk as himself
