= Fatty and Minnie He-Haw =

1914 film

- Directed by: Roscoe Arbuckle
- Produced by: Mack Sennett
- Starring: Roscoe Arbuckle
- Production company: Keystone Studios
- Distributed by: Mutual Film
- Release date: December 21, 1914
- Country: United States
- Language: Silent with English intertitles

Fatty and Minnie He-Haw is a 1914 American silent short comedy film directed by and starring Roscoe Arbuckle.

== Cast ==
- Roscoe "Fatty" Arbuckle as Fatty
- Minnie Devereaux as Minnie He-Haw
- Edward Dillon as Eddie Dillon
- Minta Durfee as Minta
- Frank Hayes as Old man at saloon
- Harry McCoy as Barfly
- Slim Summerville as Railroad employee
- Josef Swickard as Minta's father

== Preservation ==
A 16 mm print is held by George Eastman House, and the film has been released on DVD by Sunrise Silents, now defunct.

== See also ==
- List of American films of 1914
- Roscoe Arbuckle filmography
