= Hugh Pendexter =

American novelist

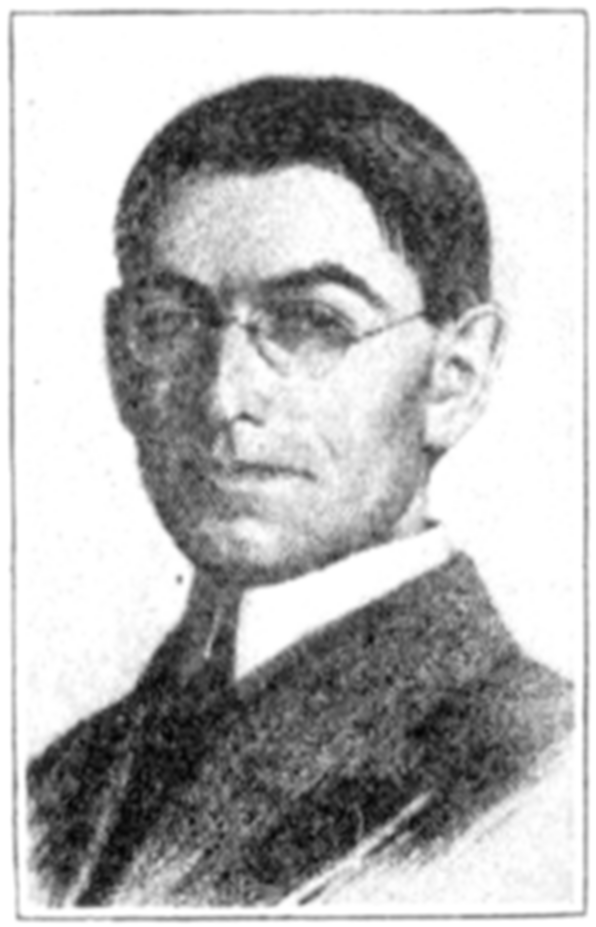
- Born: January 15, 1875; Pittsfield, Maine
- Died: June 11, 1940 (aged 65)
- Citizenship: U.S.A
- Education: Lewiston High, Lewiston, Maine
- Occupations: Novelist, screenwriter
- Spouse: Helen M. Faunce
- Writing career
- Period: 1907–1934

Hugh Pendexter (1875–1940) was an American journalist, novelist, and screenwriter.

== Biography ==
For much of his life, Pendexter lived in Norway, Maine. He spent several years as a teacher of Latin and Greek in Maine High schools and left that work to enter newspaper work in Rochester, N. Y. where he worked on the Rochester Post Express. After twelve years as news writer he returned to Norway, where he married Helen M. Faunce, and devoted his entire time to fiction writing. Pendexter was a friend of the writer Talbot Mundy.

== Work ==
Pendexter began his career as a humorous writer; some of this early work was anthologised in Mark Twain's book series, Library of Humor. Pendexter's main body of fiction consisted of historical novels and Westerns for such publications as Adventure and Argosy. Pendexter was known for his detailed research when writing fiction; his stories were "often accompanied with extensive reading lists of the books that were used in writing the story". For Short Stories magazine, Pendexter wrote a series of mystery stories featuring "Jeff Fanchon, Inquirer". Fanchon was a Manhattan-based detective of partial Native American ancestry. For the same publication Pendexter created deliberately comical Western stories about Hiram Polk, The Shorthorn Kid. Pendexter's Red Trails and The Shadow of the Tomahawk revolve around the struggle between frontiersmen and Native Americans during Dunmore's War. Pendexter's novel, Kings of the Missouri about fur trading and the founding of St. Louis, is regarded by some critics as his best work.

== Bibliography ==
- Tiberius Smith (1907)
- The young gem-hunters; or, the mystery of the haunted camp] (1911)
- The young timber-cruisers; or, Fighting the spruce pirates (1911)
- The young fishermen (1912)
- The young woodsmen (1912)
- The young sea-merchants (1913)
- The young trappers (1913)
- The young loggers; or, the gray axeman of Mt. Crow (1917)
- Gentlemen of the North (1920)
- Red belts (1920)
- Kings of the Missouri (1921) (Republished in 2013 as Along The River Trail)
- A Virginia scout (1922)
- Pay gravel (1923)
- Old Misery (1924)
- The wife-ship woman (1925)
- Harry Idaho (1926)
- The red road; a romance of Braddock's defeat (1927)
- Bird of Freedom (1928)
- The gate through the mountain (1929)
- The border breed (1933)
- The fighting years (1933)
- The scarlet years (1933)
- The blazing West (1934)
- Vigilante of Alder Gulch (1955)
- Red Trails (2013)
- The Shadow of the Tomahawk (2013)
- According to the Evidence (2013)
- The Shorthorn Kid: And Other Tales of the Old West (2014)
- The Voice of the Night: The Cases of Jeff Fanchon, Inquirer (2015)

== Movies ==
- A Daughter of the Wolf (1919)
  - Story; Black and white silent film
- Wolf Law (1922)
  - Story; Black and white silent film
