= Food for Scandal =

1920 film directed by James Cruze

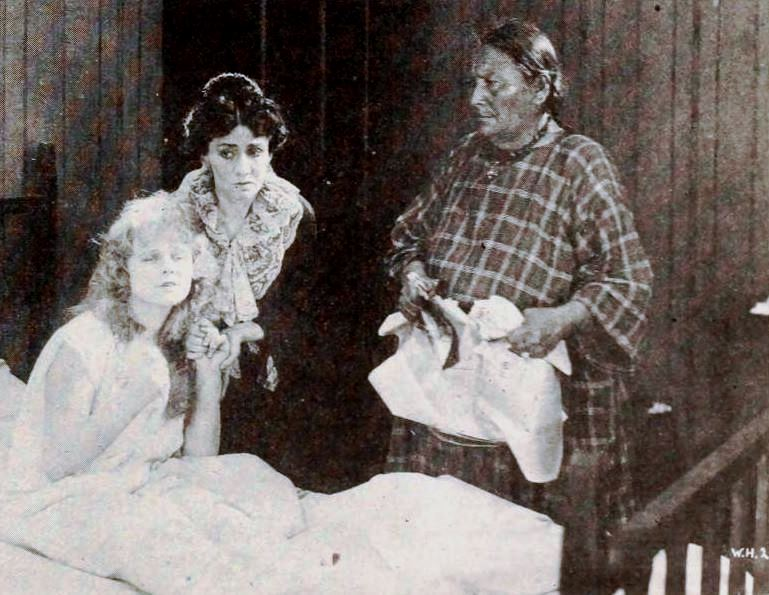
- Still with Wanda Hawley, Margaret McWade, and Minnie Devereaux
- Directed by: James Cruze
- Screenplay by: Edith Kennedy
- Based on: Beverly's Balance by Paul Kester
- Starring: Wanda Hawley; Harrison Ford; Ethel Grey Terry; Margaret McWade; Minnie Devereaux; Juan de la Cruz
- Cinematography: H. Kinley Martin
- Production company: Realart Pictures Corporation
- Distributed by: Realart Pictures Corporation
- Release date: September 12, 1920
- Running time: 50 minutes
- Country: United States
- Language: Silent (English intertitles)

Food for Scandal is a 1920 American comedy drama film directed by James Cruze and written by Edith Kennedy. The film stars Wanda Hawley, Harrison Ford, Ethel Grey Terry, Margaret McWade, Minnie Devereaux, and Juan de la Cruz. The film was released on September 12, 1920, by Realart Pictures Corporation.

== Cast ==
- Wanda Hawley as Sylvia Figueroa
- Harrison Ford as Watt Dinwiile
- Ethel Grey Terry as Nancy Horner
- Margaret McWade as Señora Maria Serra
- Minnie Devereaux as Paola
- Juan de la Cruz as Count Tizapitti
- Sidney Bracey as Padre
- Lester Cuneo as Jack Horner

== Preservation ==
In February of 2021, Food for Scandal was cited by the National Film Preservation Board on their Lost U.S. Silent Feature Films list and is therefore presumed lost.
