= Wolf Law =

1922 film

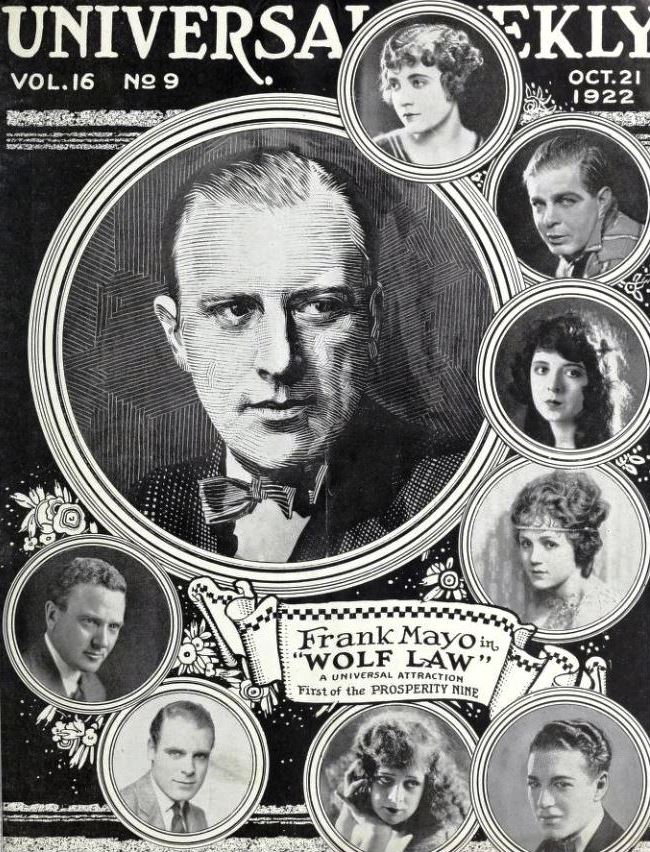
- Directed by: Stuart Paton
- Written by: Charles Sarver
- Based on: Wolf Law by Hugh Pendexter
- Produced by: Carl Laemmle
- Starring: Frank Mayo; Sylvia Breamer; Tom Guise
- Cinematography: Benjamin H. Kline
- Production company: Universal Pictures
- Distributed by: Universal Pictures
- Release date: October 23, 1922
- Running time: 50 minutes
- Country: United States
- Languages: Silent; English intertitles

Wolf Law is a 1922 American silent drama film directed by Stuart Paton and starring Frank Mayo, Sylvia Breamer and Tom Guise.

== Cast ==
- Frank Mayo as Jefferson De Croteau
- Sylvia Breamer as Francine Redney
- Tom Guise as Etienne De Croteau
- Richard Cummings as Enoch Lascar
- William Quinn as Simon Santey
- Nick De Ruiz as Samson Bender
- Harry Carter as 'Dandy' Dawson
- Paul Wismer as Mountaineer

== Bibliography ==
- Connelly, Robert B. The Silents: Silent Feature Films, 1910–36, Volume 40, Issue 2. December Press, 1998.
- Munden, Kenneth White. The American Film Institute Catalog of Motion Pictures Produced in the United States, Part 1. University of California Press, 1997.
