= Desert Legion =

1953 film by Joseph Pevney

- Directed by: Joseph Pevney
- Screenplay by: Irving Wallace; Lewis Meltzer
- Based on: novel The Demon Caravan by Georges Surdez
- Produced by: Ted Richmond
- Starring: Alan Ladd; Richard Conte; Arlene Dahl; Akim Tamiroff
- Cinematography: John F. Seitz
- Edited by: Frank Gross
- Music by: Frank Skinner
- Color process: Technicolor
- Production company: Universal Pictures
- Distributed by: Universal Pictures
- Release dates: April 3, 1953 (Los Angeles); May 8, 1953 (United States)
- Running time: 86 minutes
- Country: United States
- Language: English
- Box office: $1,650,000 (US)

Desert Legion is a 1953 American adventure film directed by Joseph Pevney and starring Alan Ladd.

== Plot ==
Ladd stars as a soldier in the French Foreign Legion who stumbles across a lost city in the desert mountains of Algeria in North Africa.

== Cast ==
- Alan Ladd as Paul Lartal
- Richard Conte as Crito
- Arlene Dahl as Morjana
- Akim Tamiroff as Pvt. Plevko
- Oscar Beregi as Khalil (as Oscar Berefi)
- Leon Askin as Major Vasil
- Anthony Caruso as Lt. Messaoud
- George J. Lewis as Lt. Lopez
- Sujata Rubener as Dancer (as Sujata)
- Asoka Rubener as Dancer (as Asoka)

== Production ==
The film was made by Universal Pictures, and based on a 1927 novel The Demon Caravan by Georges Arthur Surdez.

It was Alan Ladd's first film for Universal since becoming a star. It was a one-picture deal and gave Ladd a percentage of the profits, a relatively novel thing at the time. (He split profits with the studio 50–50.) Joseph Pevney was assigned to direct.

Ladd had broken his hand during a fight scene towards the end of his most recent film The Iron Mistress, but recovered to begin work on Desert Legion on 7 July 1952.

Akim Tamiroff joined the support cast. It was his first Hollywood film in three years.
