= Douglas Goldring =

British writer

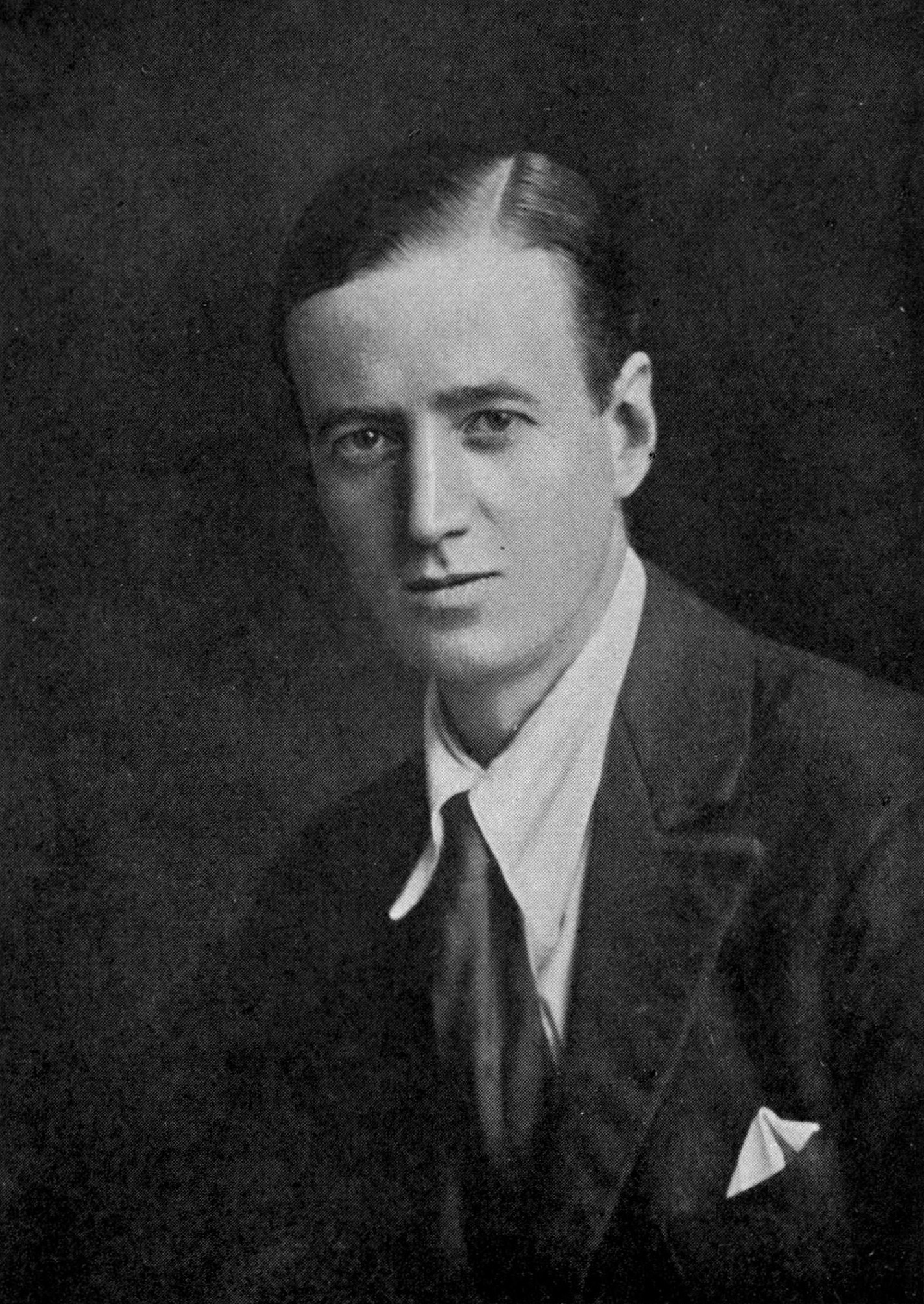
Douglas Goldring

Douglas Goldring (7 January 1887 – 9 April 1960) was an English writer and journalist.

== Early life ==
Goldring was born in Greenwich, England. He was educated initially at Hurstpierpoint, Magdalen College School and for his secondary education Felsted. He went on to Oxford in 1906; having inherited a legacy he left Oxford without a degree, and moved to London to write. He first took an editorial position at Country Life magazine. In 1908 he also became a sub-editor for English Review edited by Ford Madox Ford (at that time still named Hueffer). Goldring edited his own literary magazine, The Tramp, in 1910, publishing early work by Wyndham Lewis, and the Futurist Marinetti.

From 1912 Goldring was associated with Max Goschen, a troubled London publisher. He there produced Ford's Collected Poems (1913), principally as a financial arrangement. In 1913 he was in close contact with Wyndham Lewis and the Vorticist group, helping to achieve publication of the literary magazine BLAST printed.

== World War I ==
Goldring volunteered for the British Army in 1914, at the outbreak of World War I, but was discharged for medical reasons. Subsequently, he took a more critical attitude towards the war, from a socialist position. He joined the 1917 Club, the mixed gender Bohemian radical equivalent of a "gentlemen's club", at 4 Gerrard Street, Soho; the name celebrated the Bolshevik revolution in Russia. He moved to Dublin, Ireland, and married there his first wife, Betty Duncan; they had two children (the elder, Hugh, was killed as a soldier in World War II). While in Dublin, Goldring witnessed the funeral of the Irish Republican activist Thomas Ashe, which he later wrote about in his book A Stranger in Ireland. Goldring was a member of the National Council for Civil Liberties.

== Later life ==
In 1919 Goldring visited Germany for Clarté, Henri Barbusse's organisation. On returning to London, he intended in 1919 to establish a People's Theatre Society and publish a series of dramas, including one, by D. H. Lawrence (Touch and Go), but in the end only getting his own Fight for Freedom into print. Lawrence was initially angered by this, but their friendship was soon restored. Goldring dedicated his 1920 novel The Black Curtain to Lawrence, and wrote an appreciation of Lawrence's work in his 1920 book Reputations.

Goldring became more involved in the 1917 Club, meeting there not only the President of the Club, Ramsay MacDonald, but also Aldous Huxley, C. E. M. Joad, and E. D. Morel, until it petered out in the 1930s. Morel became a strong influence on Goldring's political thought. He witnessed the destruction in 1924 of the John Nash facades on Regent Street, leading to his later interest in the preservation of Georgian period architecture. He spent much of the 1920s on the French Riviera or in Paris. He taught in Gothenburg, Sweden from 1925 to 1927. He became known mostly as a travel writer.

In the late 1930s Goldring came to prominence in two ways. He was Secretary of the Georgian Society, which he helped to found after writing in The Daily Telegraph in 1936, with Lord Derwent and Robert Byron. Inspired by the ideas of William Morris, Goldring helped transform it in 1937 into the Georgian Group, a section within the Society for the Protection of Ancient Buildings, on the advice of Lord Esher. Goldring soon became unhappy with the Georgian Group's political conservatism and left it. He was also noted, at the same period, as a radical journalist and prolific contributor to left-wing publications. Goldring described his political views as socialist. In his last years, Goldring contributed reviews to the Socialist Labour League magazine Labour Review.

== Legacy ==
Douglas Goldring's archive is now in the special collections of the University of Victoria, Canada.

== Works ==
- A Country Boy and other poems (1910)
- Ways of Escape. A Book of Adventure (1911)
- Streets: a book of London verses (Max Goschen, 1912)
- The Permanent Uncle (1912) novel
- Dream Cities. Notes of an autumn tour in Italy and Dalmatia (1913) travel
- Along France's River of Romance: The Loire (1913) travel
- It's an Ill Wind (1915) novel
- In the Town. A Book of London Verses (1916)
- The Fortune (1917) novel including the experience of a fictional conscientious objector
- Dublin: Explorations and Reflections (1917) as "An Englishman"
- Polly (1917)
- A Stranger in Ireland (1918) as "An Englishman"
- The Black Curtain, novel
- Reputations (1920) essays
- The Solvent (1920)
- Briefe aus der Verbannung (1920)
- The Fight for Freedom, a play in four acts, with a preface by Henry Barbusse (1920)
- James Elroy Flecker (1922)
- Nobody Knows (1923) novel
- Miss Linn (1924) novel
- Gone Abroad – A story of travel chiefly in Italy and The Balearic Isles (1925) travel
- Cuckoo (1926) novel
- The Merchant of Souls (1926) novel
- Northern Lights and Southern Shade (1926) travel
- Façade (1928) novel
- The French Riviera (1928)
- People and Places (1929)
- Sardinia: the island of the Nuraghi (1930) travel
- Impacts: The Trip to the States and Other Adventures of Travel (1931)
- Liberty & Licensing. Hobby Horse Number One (1932) pamphlet
- To Portugal (1934)
- Royal London (1935)
- Odd Man Out (1935) autobiography
- Pot Luck in England (1936)
- Facing the Odds (1940)
- Artist Quarter: reminiscences of Montmartre and Montparnasse in the first two decades of the twentieth century (1941) by Charles Douglas (Douglas Goldring with Charles Beadle)
- South Lodge: reminiscences of Violet Hunt, Ford Madox Ford and the English Review circle (1943) memoirs
- A Tour in Northumbria (1944)
- The Nineteen Twenties (1945) retrospect and memoir
- Journeys in the Sun (1946)
- Marching with the Times: 1931–1946 (1947) memoirs
- The Last Pre-Raphaelite: a record of the life and writings of Ford Madox Ford (1948)
- Life Interests (1948)
- Home Ground—A Journey Through the Heart of England (1949)
- Foreign Parts: an Autumn Tour in France (1950)
- Regency Portrait Painter: the Life of Sir Thomas Lawrence, P. R. A. (1951)
- Three Romantic Countries: Reminiscences of travel in Dalmatia, Ireland and Portugal (1951)
- The South of France. The Lower Rhone Valley and the Mediterranean Seaboard from Martigues to Menton (1952)
- Privileged Persons (1955)
