= Jim Harmon =

American author and popular culture historian

- Following a 1962 screening of Don Glut's films at CBS (Hollywood), Glut took this photo of film editor Bob Burns, Jim Harmon, and musician Ron Haydock.
- Born: James Judson Harmon; April 21, 1933; Mount Carmel, Illinois, U.S.
- Died: February 16, 2010 (aged 76); Burbank, California, U.S.
- Occupations: Historian; writer
- Writing career
- Pen name: Judson Grey "Mr. Nostalgia"
- Genre: Science fiction
- Subject: Radio
- Notable work: Harmon's Galaxy

James Judson Harmon (21 April 1933 – 16 February 2010), better known as Jim Harmon, was an American short story author and popular culture historian who wrote extensively about the Golden Age of Radio. He sometimes used the pseudonym Judson Grey, and occasionally he was labeled Mr. Nostalgia.

== Fiction ==
During the 1950s and 1960s, Harmon wrote more than 50 short stories and novelettes for Amazing Stories, Future Science Fiction, Galaxy Science Fiction, If, The Magazine of Fantasy & Science Fiction, Venture Science Fiction Magazine and other magazines. These were collected in such science fiction anthologies as Fourth Galaxy Reader, Galaxy: Thirty Years of Speculative Fiction and Rare Science Fiction.

The best of Harmon's science fiction stories were reprinted in Harmon's Galaxy (Cosmos Books, 2004) with an introduction by Richard A. Lupoff. The collection includes one from the December 1962 issue of The Magazine of Fantasy & Science Fiction ("The Depths") and five from Galaxy—"Charity Case" (December 1959), "Name Your Symptom" (May 1956), "No Substitutions" (November 1958), "The Place Where Chicago Was" (February 1962) and "The Spicy Sound of Success" (August 1959).

His only science fiction novel, The Contested Earth (Ramble House, 1959), was given its first publication in 2007 along with seven short stories in The Contested Earth and Other SF Stories. In the introduction, Harmon reflected on the novel's history:

This is a period piece, written during the last years of the pulp era. I was 26 in 1959, and some science fiction magazines were still in the old familiar pulp magazine style of about seven by nine inches, such as Science Fiction Quarterly... Due to a health problem, I had little formal education. But I read a lot and thought a lot and imagined a lot. I became a science fiction writer. The Contested Earth was my first science fiction novel. I had written a number of novelettes and short stories and sold a good number to the aforementioned SF Quarterly and more to one of the leading SF magazines, Galaxy. The editor there, H. L. Gold, was incredibly supportive of a teen-age writer. In one editorial, he referred to me as a “Vesuvius of flaming, literary lava”. What more can be said after that! Yet he did not accept this novel. One reason (but only one) was that in those days novels were accepted almost exclusively by the leaders in the field like Robert Heinlein, Isaac Asimov and Theodore Sturgeon, by both magazines and paperback and hardcover publishers. After a number of submissions back then, I stopped submitting this novel. As the years passed and the number of manuscript I kept got down to a single Stor-All box, I would go through these yellowing bundles of pages and throw some away—ones I had published and ones I thought I would never publish. Somehow, I decided to keep this novel “a little while longer.” Finally, I encountered Fender Tucker and his wonderful endeavor, Ramble House, and got a go-ahead to put out The Contested Earth. I made changes in it, but mostly in writing style.

Harmon also wrote Western tales for such magazines as Double-Action Western, plus detective and crime stories (Smashing Detective, Pursuit). Eight of his mystery novels have been slightly revised by Harmon and reprinted by Ramble House in trade editions,

== Radio ==
When Harmon began writing about the classic radio shows, almost no books on the subject had been published, so he had the field to himself. He got underway with Radio Hero, a small circulation self-published magazine started in 1963. His first mainstream book on the subject was The Great Radio Heroes (Doubleday, 1967; revised edition by McFarland & Company, 2002). Library Journal reviewed:

Radio producer Harmon here expands his 1967 original to include numerous photos of actors who starred in the radio shows of yesteryear and to update their profiles (what they are doing now, who died, etc.). Chapters cover the stars of cop shows, Westerns, comedies, adventures, and dramas. A good one-stop resource for information on the days when radio was the leading form of home entertainment.

Harmon's other books include The Great Radio Comedians (Doubleday, 1970; revised edition by BearManor Media, 2007), Jim Harmon's Nostalgia Catalogue (J.P. Tarcher, 1973), The Great Movie Serials (Routledge, 1973), The Godzilla Book (Borgo, 1986), Radio & TV Premiums: A Guide to the History and Value of Radio and TV Premiums (Krause, 1997), Radio Mystery and Adventure and Its Appearances in Film, Television and Other Media (McFarland, 2003).

=== Radio into fiction ===
He edited volumes two and three of It's That Time Again (Bearmanor Media, 2004 and 2006), an anthology series of new fiction featuring the characters of old-time radio. His story in the first volume is "Tom Mix and the Mystery of the Bodiless Horseman." For the second book in the series, he contributed "Sherlock Holmes and the Adventure of the Duplicate Daughter" and "The Avenger and the Maker of Werewolves." The third volume in the series introduced character crossovers, and Harmon combined Nick Carter, Jack Armstrong and Tom Mix into a single novelette, Jack Armstrong and the Horde of Montezuma.

One of the earliest dealers to issue a catalog of tapes of old time radio shows, Harmon also wrote, produced and appeared in a radio revival of the Tom Mix radio series during the early 1980s.

== Monsters of the Movies ==
From 1974 to 1975, Harmon was the West Coast editor of Curtis Magazines' Monsters of the Movies, Marvel Comics' short-lived attempt to emulate Warren Publishing's Famous Monsters of Filmland. Monsters of the Movies covered classic and contemporary horror movies, and included interviews, articles and photo features.

== Death ==
Harmon died February 16, 2010, of a heart attack.

== Awards ==
Harmon was the guest of honor at the Multicon 70 science-fiction convention, held in Oklahoma City in June 1970, and a 1977 recipient of the Inkpot Award, given annually at San Diego Comic-Con.

== Bibliography ==
=== Short stories ===
- "Blueblood" Galaxy, December 1960
- "The Air of Castor Oil" Galaxy, August 1961
- "Always a Qurono" Galaxy, August 1962
- "How to Make Friends" Galaxy, October 1962
- "Big Business" Galaxy, April 1966
- "Howling Day" Galaxy, June 1967
