= Mickey (1918 film) =

1918 film by James Young, F. Richard Jones

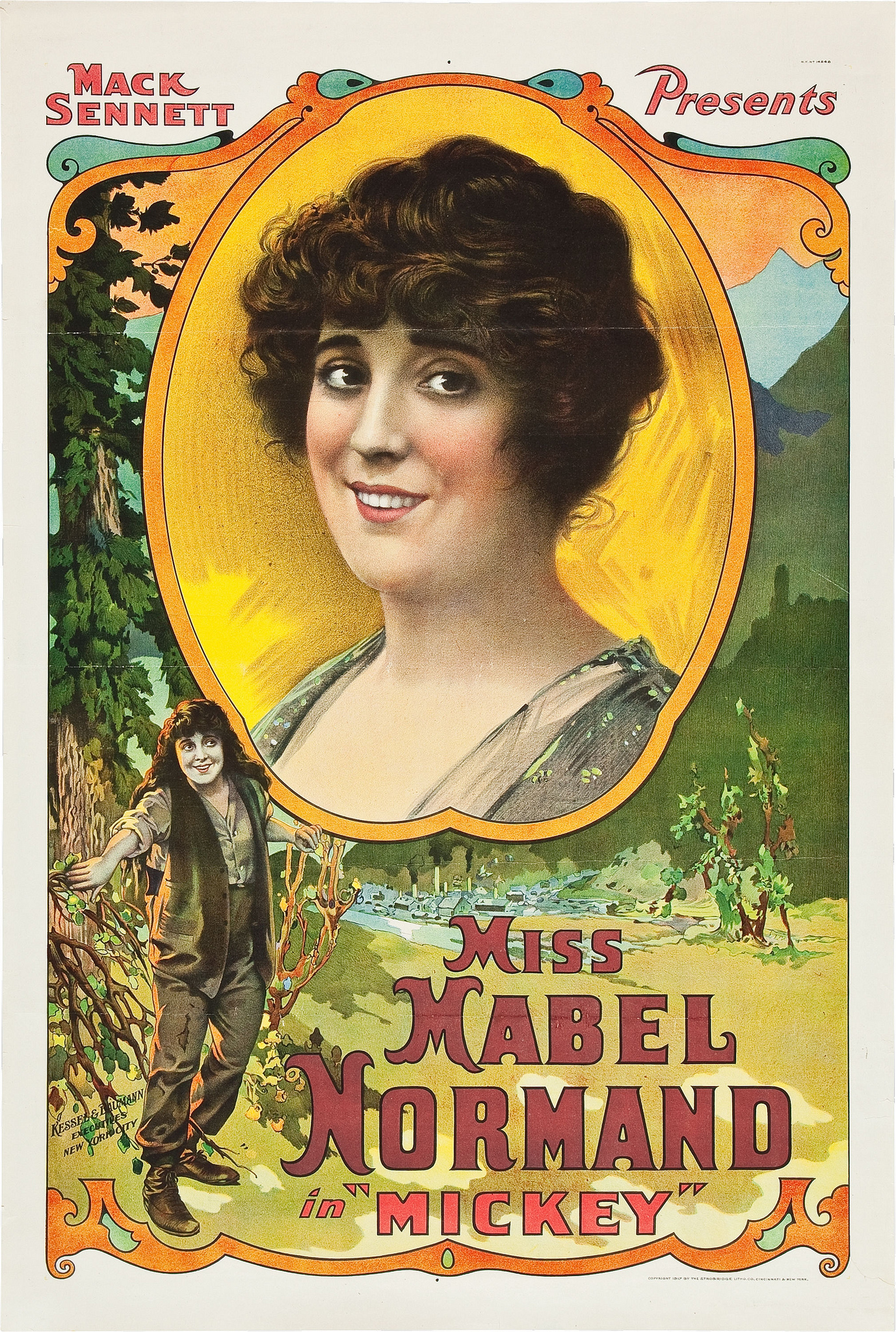
- Film poster
- Directed by: F. Richard Jones; James Young
- Written by: J.G. Hawks
- Produced by: Mabel Normand; Mack Sennett
- Starring: Mabel Normand
- Cinematography: Fred Jackman; Hans F. Koenekamp; Hugh McClung; Frank D. Williams
- Edited by: John O'Donnell
- Distributed by: States Rights Independent Exchanges; Film Booking Offices of America (FBO)
- Release date: August 1918
- Running time: 93 minutes
- Country: United States
- Languages: Silent film English intertitles
- Budget: $250,000
- Box office: $16,450,000

Mickey is a 1918 silent comedy-drama film starring Mabel Normand, directed by F. Richard Jones and James Young, and written by J.G. Hawks. The movie was produced by the Mabel Normand Feature Film Company.

== Plot ==
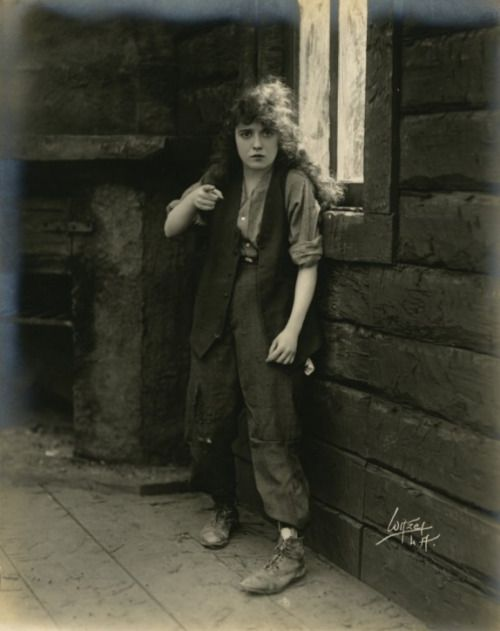
The titular character of the film, Mickey (publicity photograph)

Mickey is an adult orphan who has been raised since girlhood in poverty near Feather River, California, by an unsuccessful miner, Joe Meadows, and his housekeeper, Minnie. Mickey is the free-spirited, uncultured daughter of the miner's deceased wife. Joe took charge of Mickey at her dying mother's request.

Mickey is sent to live in Great Neck, Long Island—part of suburban New York City—with her aunt, Mrs. Drake, and her family. Mrs. Drake is under the impression that Mickey is wealthy and well refined. When Mickey arrives at her aunt's luxurious home, she is disappointed that Mickey is not well-to-do and puts her to work as a servant. Mickey's presence there sparks an awkward love triangle involving her, her cousin Elsie, and young mining executive Herbert Thornhill, whom Mickey first met in California. Just after Mickey is sent packing, a telegram arrives for her announcing that a vein has been struck on Joe's Tomboy mine and she is suddenly worth millions. Mrs. Drake's opinion of Mickey changes quickly and she is welcomed back—in the hope she and Mrs. Drake's feckless son, Reggie, will become a couple.

Herbert proposes to Elsie, but realizes he loves Mickey. Shortly afterward, Herbert receives a telegram from his lawyer, Tom Rawlings, explaining that his mining claims are now invalid and thus worthless. Elsie and Mrs. Drake find the telegram and call off the wedding because Herbert is now bankrupt. Herbert tries to regain his fortune by borrowing $5,000 and betting it on a horse race. The race is rigged—and Mickey finds out about the plot. Just as the race is about to begin, Mickey dresses in jockey silks, unhorses the crooked jockey, and tries to win the race by riding it for Herbert. Just as it appears Mickey's horse will win, she falls from her mount. Some time later Mickey reluctantly goes horseback riding with Reggie, who tries to molest her in an abandoned house. Herbert arrives on the scene, battles Reggie, and rescues Mickey as she is dangling dangerously from the rooftop. Mickey and Herbert are married. As they depart on their honeymoon, a note arrives from Rawlings explaining the earlier telegram about Herbert's mining interests being worthless was a ruse designed to get Herbert out of his loveless engagement to Elsie.

Mickey

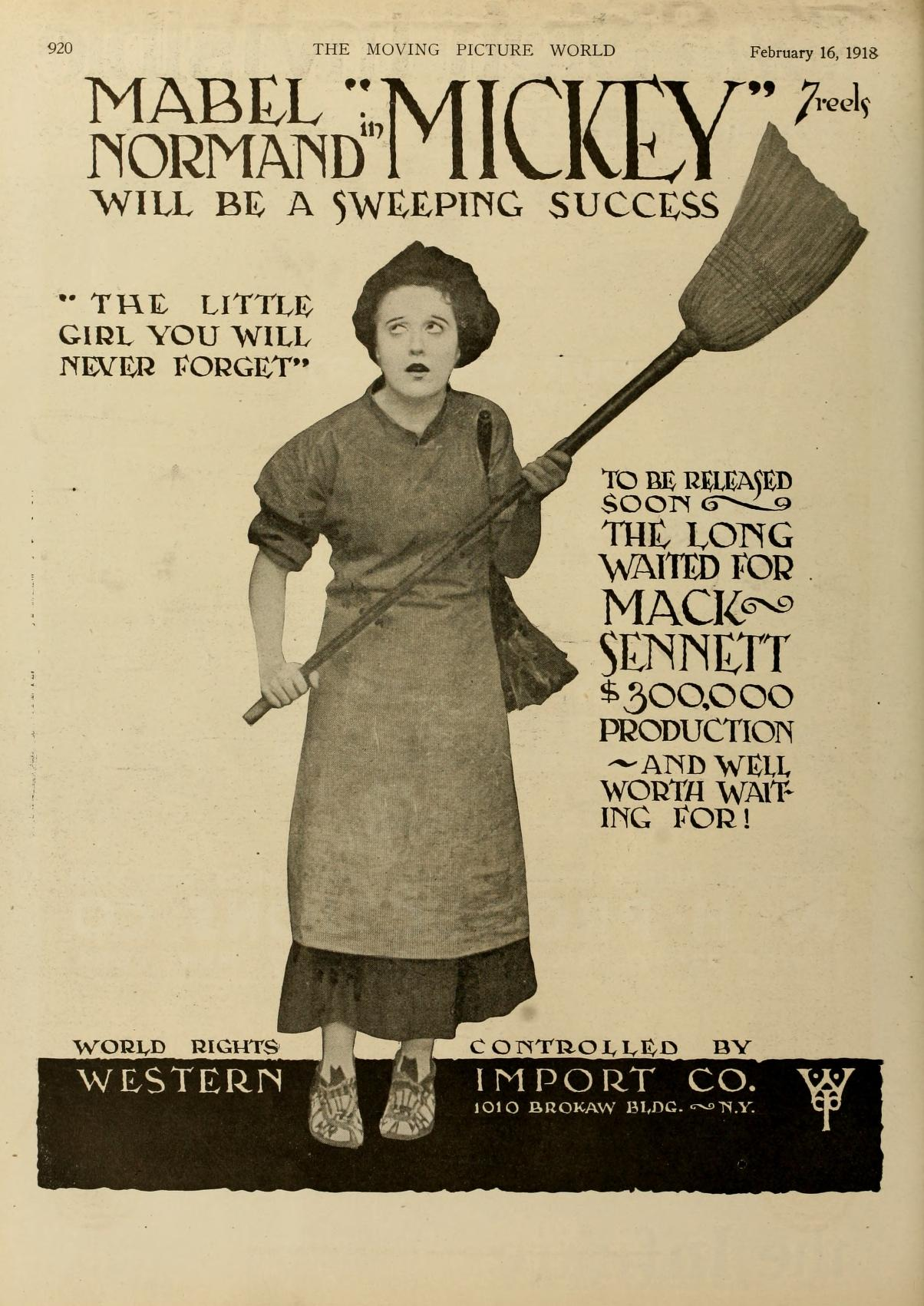
1918 magazine ad

== Cast ==
- Mabel Normand as Mickey
- George Nichols as Joe Meadows
- Wheeler Oakman as Herbert Thornhill
- Minta Durfee as Elsie Drake
- Laura La Varnie as Mrs. Geoffrey Drake
- Lew Cody as Reggie Drake
- Tom Kennedy as Tom Rawlings
- Minnie Devereaux as Minnie

== Delay in widespread release ==
Despite its eventual popularity, Mickey was not widely shown for more than a year. According to Mack Sennett's 1954 autobiography, King of Comedy, the film was perceived to be a flop and initial response by distributors was resoundingly negative. This attitude perplexed Sennett because he thought Mickey was the best film his studio had ever produced for Mabel Normand. He believed the script gave Normand tremendous scope and range for her whimsical talents. Nevertheless, Sennett continued to publicize the movie in trade publications to keep it in the minds of the theater owners. After about two years, however, Sennett learned that a small theater in Bayside, Long Island was unexpectedly without any film to screen one night and the proprietor was desperate. Sennett quickly offered him a copy of Mickey. Having no alternative, he eagerly accepted Sennett's suggestion. With only minimal advertising, Mickey attracted an enormous crowd and the audience's response was very favorable. Shortly thereafter, other theaters clamored for prints of the film too. By the time Mickey had become a box office hit, Mabel Normand was no longer under contract to Mack Sennett, having signed a lucrative five-year deal with Sam Goldwyn.

== Title song ==
"Mickey", played by Henry Burr

"Mickey", played by Billy Murray

"Mickey" is also the title of a song adapted from the movie, with lyrics by Harry Williams and music by Neil Moret (pseudonym for Charles N. Daniels), copyrighted in 1918 and published by Daniels & Wilson of San Francisco and New York. The song can be heard in some public domain releases of the film.

== Reception ==
Mickey was re-released each year into 1921. During that time, an estimated 41.8 million tickets were sold for the film, making it the most-attended film of the silent era. Its ticket sales were not surpassed until 1938 by Snow White and the Seven Dwarfs.

The film was widely celebrated by critics. A review in The Tatler said "No photoplay yet produced is so filled with adventure, thrills and human emotions as Mickey." A critic in Moving Picture World wrote "Mickey is a digest of the science of producing motion pictures. It has everything imaginable that might be conceived by the most inventive producer, past or present."
