= Harry Stephen Keeler =

American writer (1890–1967)

- Born: November 3, 1890; Chicago, Illinois, U.S.
- Died: January 22, 1967 (aged 76); Chicago, Illinois, U.S.
- Occupation: Writer

Harry Stephen Keeler (November 3, 1890 – January 22, 1967) was a prolific but little-known American fiction writer, who developed a cult following for his eccentric mysteries. He also wrote science fiction.

== Biography ==
=== Early life ===
Keeler was born in Chicago on November 3, 1890. Sources published during Keeler's lifetime sometimes incorrectly stated that he was born 1894. In 1892, his father died, bequeathing to his family an estate that included their home. Keeler's mother remarried to a gambling addict. He killed himself after he lost the family's savings and mortgaged their home. In order to earn income, Keeler's mother turned the family home into a boarding house which later attracted theatre workers. Keeler's mother subsequently married a third time around 1900; in 1903, her third husband died from a fever. According to Francis M. Nevins, these traumatic events likely "drove Keeler out of touch with the 'real world' and led him to retreat into an alternate universe of his own making".

During high school, Keeler worked delivering newspapers, starting his shifts before dawn. On occasion he would miss class. He later said that he preferred being truant on days he was scheduled to attend classes in grammar and rhetoric. Eventually, he received a degree in electrical engineering from the Armour Institute. In early 1912, he went to live in the Ozarks, before returning to Chicago to work at a steel mill, where he worked until 1914.

Keeler's interest in literature dated back to 1910. A daily journal that he began that year and maintained until shortly before his death stated that he had written a 2,700-word short story titled "The Telescopic Romance" which he had been unable to publish. He wrote nothing further until 1913, when he produced seven short stories, one of which was published. In 1914, he wrote nineteen short stories and three novellas, including "Victim No. 5", his first piece of published crime fiction. The story, he recounted years later, had occurred to him while crossing the State Street Bridge. With the earnings of US$10 (equivalent to $321.43 in 2025) from the story, Keeler was able to pay off four weeks' worth of back rent, as well as take his romantic partner to a dinner and show.

Subsequently, Keeler turned his attention away from short stories and, instead, to novellas. In the period up to 1919, Keeler wrote an average of 170,000 words per year, and he sold his works to Argosy and Top-Notch Magazine, among other periodicals.

=== With E. P. Dutton ===
Eight of Keeler's earliest works first appeared in pulp fiction magazines like Complete Novel and Top Notch.

His first four novels were originally released in England by Hutchinson, beginning in 1924 with The Voice of the Seven Sparrows. Beginning in 1927, E.P. Dutton took over publication of Keeler's novels in the US. Between 1927 and 1942, Dutton released 37 novels by Keeler. In the United Kingdom, publication of Keeler's novels, sometimes with altered titles and reworked prose, fell to Ward, Lock & Co., who went on to publish 48 novels by Keeler from 1929 to 1953. The Voice of the Seven Sparrows introduced audiences the world over to Keeler's complicated "webwork plot" story lines with wildly improbable in-story coincidences and sometimes sheerly baffling conclusions. Keeler's complex, labyrinthine stories generally alienated his intended reading audience.

Owing to his popularity with Dutton, however, Keeler gained notoriety in the mid-1930s as a purveyor of new and original stories. His popularity peaked when his book Sing Sing Nights was used to "suggest" two different low-budget mystery-adventure films, namely Sing Sing Nights (Monogram Pictures, 1933) and The Mysterious Mr. Wong (Monogram, 1935), the latter of which starred screen legend Bela Lugosi. During this period Keeler was employed as an editor for Ten Story Book, a popular pulp short-story magazine that also included photos of nude and scantily clad young women. Keeler proceeded to fill the spaces between the features with his own peculiar brand of humor and included illustrations drawn by his wife, Hazel. Here, he also often publicized his own books.

Keeler's relations with the Duttons grew erratic and strained. Keeler's 1941 novel The Peacock Fan appears to take a dig at the Duttons through a pair of faintly disguised characters. In his later career, Keeler's fiction and writing style grew more bizarre and his books longer. He often substituted plot with lengthy dialogue and diatribes between characters. His readership flagged. In 1942, after releasing The Book with the Orange Leaves, Keeler was dropped by Dutton. Ward, Lock & Co. continued to issue his books in the United Kingdom until 1953.

=== Later years ===
The years from 1942 to 1953 were difficult for Keeler. His writing drifted even further beyond the norm and short stories written by his wife (a moderately successful writer herself) were found more and more within his novels. Keeler typically padded the length of his novels with the following device: his protagonist would find a magazine or book, open it at random and discover a story. At this point, Keeler's novel would insert the complete verbatim text of one of his wife's short stories, this being the story his novel's protagonist was reading. At the end of the story, the novel would continue where it left off, several pages nearer to its contractual minimum word count. These stories-within-the-novel typically contained only a few scraps of information that were relevant to the novel in which they appeared.

Keeler's novels were picked up by rental library publisher Phoenix Press, known in the business as the "last stop on the publishing bus". By 1953, British publishers Ward, Lock & Co. printed their final Keeler novel, thus forcing the writer to pen his stories exclusively for an overseas market with stories often translated for publication in Spain and Portugal.

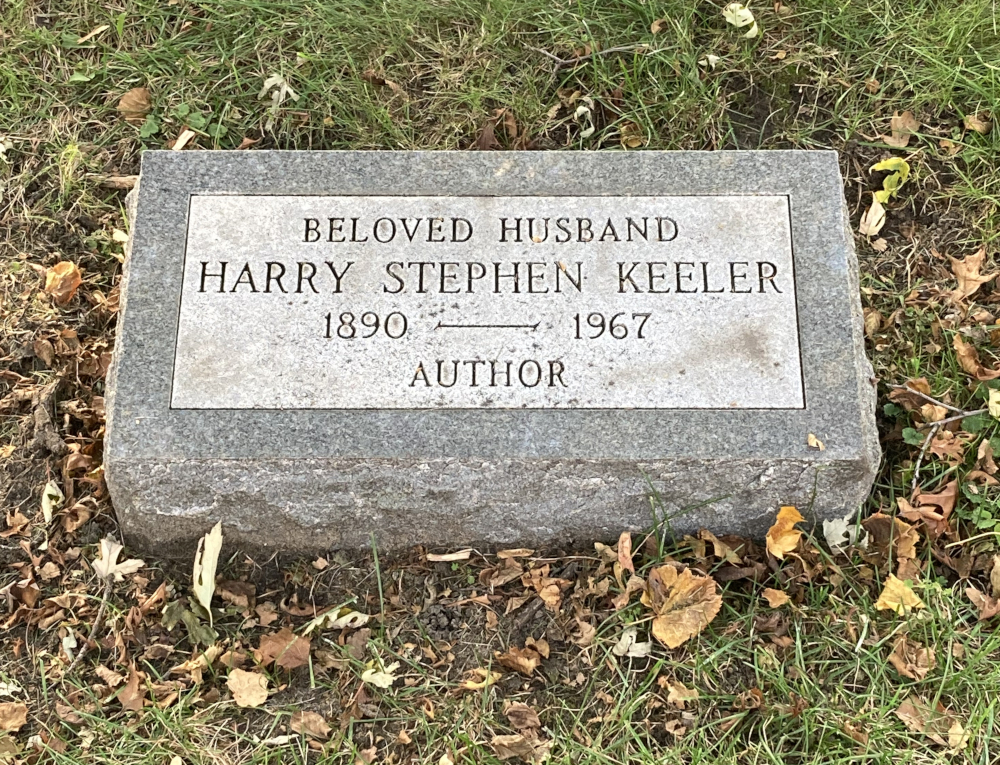
Keeler's grave at Rosehill Cemetery

Hazel died in 1960. Keeler remarried in 1963 to his onetime secretary Thelma Rinaldo, which rejuvenated his spirit for writing. Unfortunately, many of the new stories written by Keeler during this time went unpublished, including the relatively infamous The Scarlet Mummy. Keeler died in Chicago four years later, in 1967. He and his wife Hazel are buried in Rosehill Cemetery.

=== After death ===
In 2005, The Collins Library (an imprint of McSweeney's) republished Keeler's 1934 classic, The Riddle of the Traveling Skull, a project much pursued by writer and publisher Paul Collins. Ramble House has published other works by him.

== Writing techniques and preoccupations ==
Most of Keeler's novels feature what Keeler called a "webwork plot" ("ludicrous but internally consistent coincidence"). This can be defined as a plot that includes many strands or threads (each thread representing a character or significant object), which intersect in complex causal interactions. A webwork novel typically ends with a surprise revelation which clarifies these interactions. According to Keeler's 1927 series of articles on plot theory, "The Mechanics (and Kinematics) of Web-Work Plot Construction", a webwork plot is typically built around a sequence in which the main character intersects at least four other strands, one after the other, and each of these encounters causes the next one. Keeler never claimed to have invented the webwork plot, but only to be its theorist and practitioner.

Keeler followed a writing procedure of his own; he'd often write a huge manuscript, perhaps twice the length required. He'd then cut it down to size, removing unnecessary subplots and incidents. The removed material (which he called "the Chunk") would sit around until Keeler wrote another manuscript to use it, which might result in yet cutting procedure, and another "Chunk". In his book Thieves' Nights, the hero reads a book which is about two other men telling stories: a framing device within a framing device. In another book, Keeler and his wife turn up as characters in a story.

Keeler kept a large file of newspaper clippings featuring unusual stories and incidents. He is reputed to have pasted these into the rough outlines of his novels, adding notes like "Have this happen to... "

Keeler is known for the MacGuffin-esque insertion of skulls into nearly all his stories. While many plots revolved around a skull or the use of one in a crime or ritual, others featured skulls as a diversion. As an example, a human skull was used as a paperweight on the desk of a police detective.

Several of Keeler's novels make reference to a fictional book entitled The Way Out, which is apparently a tome of ancient Oriental wisdom. The significance of the nonexistent Way Out in Keeler's world is equivalent to the role played by the Necronomicon within H. P. Lovecraft's work.

== Influence ==
In the late 1930s, British writer John Russell Fearn gave credit to Keeler for inspiring his experiments with webwork plots in his pulp SF stories.

Keeler has influenced later writers, including Icelandic novelist Sjón has acknowledged Keeler as an inspiration.

== Works ==
=== Series ===
Tuddleton Trotter Series

- The Matilda Hunter Murder (1931) (UK title The Black Satchel)
- The Case of the Barking Clock (1947)
- The Trap (1956)

Marceau Series

- The Marceau Case (1936)
- X. Jones—Of Scotland Yard (1936)
- The Wonderful Scheme of Mr. Christopher Thorne (1936)
- Y. Cheung, Business Detective (1939)

The Mysterious Mr. I

- The Mysterious Mr. I (1937)
- The Chameleon (1939)

Vagabond Nights

- The Skull of the Waltzing Clown (1935)
- The Defrauded Yeggman (1937)
- Ten Hours (1937)
- When Thief Meets Thief (1938)

Hallowe'en Nights

- Finger! Finger! (1938)
- Behind That Mask (1938)

Adventures of a Skull

- The Man with the Magic Eardrums (1939)
- The Man with the Crimson Box (1940)
- The Man with the Wooden Spectacles (1941)
- The Case of the Lavender Gripsack (1941)

The Big River Trilogy

- The Portrait of Jirjohn Cobb (1939) (UK title: 'Find Actor Hart)
- Cleopatra's Tears (1940)
- The Bottle with the Green Wax Seal (1942)

Circus Series

- The Vanishing Gold Truck (1941)
- The Case of the Jeweled Ragpicker (1948) (UK title The Ace of Spades Murder)
- Stand By—London Calling! (1953)
- The Case of the Crazy Corpse
- The Circus Stealers
- A Copy of Beowulf
- Report on Vanessa Hewstone
- The Six from Nowhere
- The Case of the Two-Headed Idiot

The Way Out Series

- The Peacock Fan
- The Sharkskin Book
- The Book with the Orange Leaves
- The Case of the Two Strange Ladies
- The Case of the 16 Beans

Steeltown Series

- The Case of the Canny Killer
- The Steeltown Strangler
- The Crimson Cube

Quiribus Brown Series

- The Murdered Mathematician
- The Case of the Flying Hands

Hong Lei Chung Series

- The Strange Will
- The Street of a Thousand Eyes
- The Six from Nowhere
- The Riddle of the Wooden Parakeet

=== Non-series novels and short fiction ===
- Adventure in Milwaukee
- The Affair of the Bottled Deuce
- The Amazing Web (1930)
- The Blackmailer
- The Box from Japan (1932)
- The Case of the Ivory Arrow
- The Case of the Mysterious Moll (1944) (UK title: The Iron Ring)
- The Case of the Transparent Nude
- The Case of the Transposed Legs
- The Face of the Man from Saturn (1933) (UK Title The Crilly Court Mystery)
- Find the Clock (1925)
- The Five Silver Buddhas (1935)
- The Flyer Hold-Up
- The Fourth King (1929)
- The Gallows Waits, My Lord
- The Green Jade Hand (1930)
- Hangman's Nights
- I Killed Lincoln at 10:13!
- The Iron Ring
- "John Jones's Dollar" (1927)
- The Man Who Changed His Skin
- The Monocled Monster
- The Murder of London Lew
- The Mysterious Card
- The Mysterious Ivory Ball of Wong Shing Li
- The Mystery of the Fiddling Cracksman (1934) (UK title The Fiddling Cracksman)
- The Photo of Lady X
- The Riddle of the Traveling Skull (1934) (UK title The Traveling Skull)
- The Scarlet Mummy (1965)
- The Search for X-Y-Z
- Sing Sing Nights (1928)
- The Spectacles of Mr. Cagliostro (1926) (also published as The Blue Spectacles)
- Strange Journey
- The Straw Hat Murders
- The Stolen Gravestone
- Thieves' Nights (1929)
- The Riddle of the Yellow Zuri (1930) (UK title: The Tiger Snake)
- The Voice of the Seven Sparrows (1924)
- The Washington Square Enigma (1933) (UK title: Under Twelve Stars)
- The White Circle

== See also ==
- Metafiction
- Story within a story
