= Georges Surdez =

Swiss writer (1900-1949)

Georges Arthur Surdez (1900–1949) was a Swiss writer of adventure stories. He invented the term "Russian Roulette" in a story of the same name published in Collier's magazine.

== Biography ==
Surdez was born in Bienne, Switzerland, of French descent. Surdez's family emigrated to America when Surdez was aged thirteen; he went to school in New York. Surdez spent several years living in the French colonies in North Africa and Central Africa. In 1920 Surdez returned to the United States and remained in the country for most of his life.

== Writing career ==
Surdez specialised in writing fiction about the French Foreign Legion. Surdez researched the Foreign Legion in detail, and once visited the organization's training camp at Sidi Bel Abbès, Algeria to gather information about the Legion. He was a regular contributor to Adventure, with over 100 stories appearing. Surdez's work also appeared in other magazines, including Argosy, Blue Book, Short Stories and Collier's.

== Adaptions ==
His short story A Game in the Bush was filmed as South Sea Love in 1927. His novel "The Demon Caravan" was filmed as Desert Legion starring Alan Ladd. He also created Russian roulette

== Personal life ==
He married an older schoolteacher, Edith McKenna, in 1922. They divorced after she left him for another man in 1943.

== Critical reception ==
Writer Lee Server wrote "The Swiss-born Surdez was at once the most elegant prose stylist and the most realistic of all the pulpsters and novelists of the early 20th century who specialized in tales of the French Foreign Legion." Pulp magazine historian Tim Cottrill stated that Surdez is "considered one of the best writers among early pulpsters".

== Works ==
=== Novels ===
- Swords of the Soudan, 1923.
- The Demon Caravan, 1927
- They March from Yesterday (1 March 1930, published by Adventure magazine).
- Homeland, 1946 (autobiographical novel).

=== Short stories ===
- Dinner for Monsieur Martin.
- The Yellow Streak
- Sons Of The Sword, 1928, published in Adventure.
- A Game In The Bush
- Hell's Half-Way House
- Russian roulette, 1937, published in Collier's.
- The Haunted Wall, 1941
