= Edgar Franklin Wittmack =

American illustrator & cover artist (1894-1956)

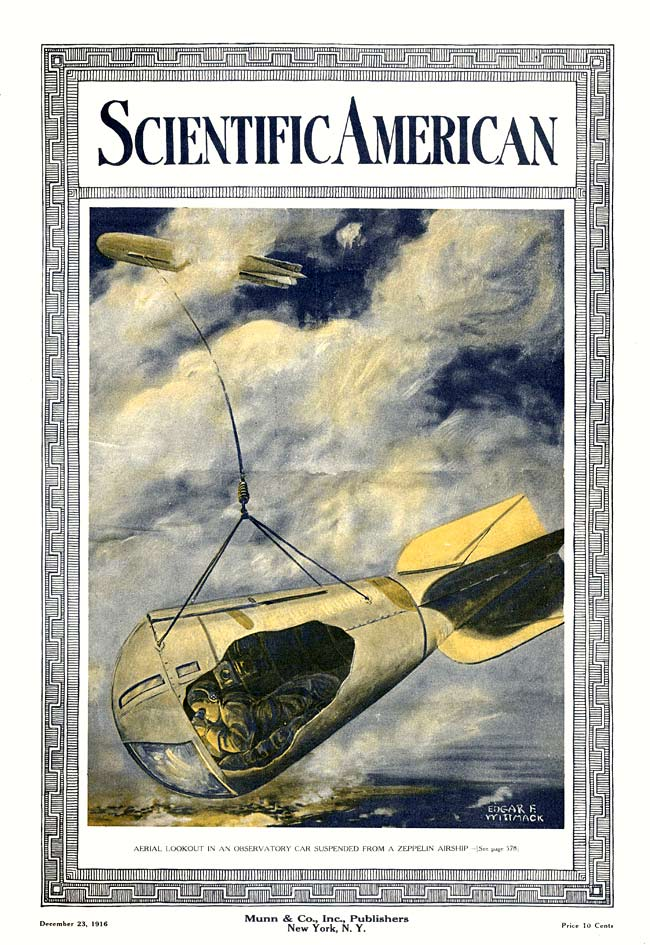
Wittmack illustrated a 1916 Scientific American cover with a Zeppelin spy basket.

Edgar Franklin Wittmack (1894–1956) was an illustrator and cover artist for many of the most popular magazines of the 1920s and 1930s. His covers, just as the artwork of his contemporary, Norman Rockwell, were usually created as oil paintings. Where Rockwell specialized in the humorous aspects of small-town life, Wittmack dealt mainly with male-oriented interests. He often painted heroic or action-type figures for the Saturday Evening Post, American Boy, Outdoor Life as well as the "quality" pulp magazines such as Adventure and Short Stories.

However, he is probably most known for the covers he created for Popular Science. His "retro-futuristic" style was used during the depression to artistically convert the ideas of inventive Americans into unique visual expressions of potential reality.
