= Arthur O. Friel =

American novelist

Arthur Olney Friel (31 May 1885 – 27 January 1959) was one of the most popular writers for the adventure pulps.

Born in Detroit, Michigan, Friel, a 1909 Yale University graduate, had been South American editor for the Associated Press which led him into his subject matter. In 1922, he became a real-life explorer when he took a six-month trip down Venezuela's Orinoco River and its tributary, the Ventuari River. His travel account was published in 1924 as The River of Seven Stars.

After returning from the Venezuela trip, many of Friel's stories were set in that environment. He remained a popular writer in Adventure throughout the 1920s and 1930s. Most of his longer works were republished in hardback. In the 1930s, he started appearing more regularly in the adventure pulp Short Stories with stories set in Venezuela.

He was a member of the American Geographical Society.

In a 1934 letter, Robert E. Howard described Friel as "one of my favorite authors".

He died in Concord, New Hampshire in 1959, the state where he had grown up.

== Pedro and Lourenço ==
Friel began appearing in Adventure magazine in 1919 with stories set in the Amazon jungle featuring the characters Pedro Andrada and Lourenço Moraes, two seringueiros (rubber-industry workers) who undergo harrowing experiences in the impenetrable jungle surrounding the Javary River, an Amazon tributary which forms part of the border between Brazil and Peru. The "Pedro and Lourenço" stories include:

- "The Snake" (September 18, 1919)
- "The Sloth" (October 18, 1919)
- "The Spider" (December 1, 1919)
- "The Jaguar" (January 3, 1920)
- "The Jabiru" (January 18, 1920)
- "Clay John" (February 3, 1920)
- "The Peccaries" (March 3, 1920)
- "The Vampire" (April 18, 1920)
- "The Mother of the Moon" (June 18, 1920)
- "The Armadillo" (August 18, 1920)
- "The Tapir" (October 3, 1920)
- "The Firefly" (November 3, 1920)
- "The Tucandeira" (December 3, 1920)
- "The Vulture" (January 3, 1921)
- "The Tailed Men" (February 18, 1921)
- "Wild Women" (March 13, 1921)
- "The Trumpeter" (May 3, 1921)
- "The Barrigudo" (June 3, 1921)
- "The Ant Eater" (July 18, 1921)
- "The Bouto" (July 18, 1921)
- "Black Hawk" (March 10, 1922)
- "Tupahn—The Thunderstorm" (May 10, 1922)
- "Scarlet Face" (June 1, 1929)
- "Spiderlegs" (Jun 15 1929)
- "Owl Eyes" (Dec 1 1929)
- "Red Giants" (Dec 15 1929)

and the novella The Jararaca (December 30, 1921). (NOTE: "The Snake", "The Sloth", "The Jaguar", "The Jabiru", "Clay John" and "The Peccaries" are stories in which Lourenço appears by himself.) The events of Black Hawk take place immediately after those in The Jararaca, and the character of "Thomas Gordon Mack", an American explorer, is a major character in both stories. Some of the Pedro and Laurenco stories feature minor science fiction elements, such as lost civilizations and ape-human hybrids.

The "Pedro and Lourenço" stories have been recently published in collections including Amazon Nights: Classic Adventure Tales from the Pulps, Black Hawk and Other Tales of the Amazon: The Adventures of Pedro and Lourenço, and Amazon Stories Volume I and II.

== McKay, Ryan and Knowlton ==
In late 1922, Friel began writing longer works, which were serialized in Adventure. The first ones, featuring a trio of adventurers called McKay, Ryan and Knowlton, and other characters, were The Pathless Trail, Tiger River, The King of No-Man's Land and Mountains of Mystery. A later novel in sequence, In the Year 2000 (1928) was not printed in book form. In the Year 2000 is set after a worldwide war and features the grandson of Knowlton and McKay.

The Pathless Trail, and Tiger River were republished by Centaur Press in November 1969 and May 1971, respectively.

== Bibliography ==
=== McKay, Ryan and Knowlton ===
- The Pathless Trail (1922)
- Tiger River (1923)
- The King of No Man's Land (1924)
- Mountains of Mystery (1925)

=== Other books ===
- King--of Kearsarge (1921)
- Cat O'Mountain (1923)
- The River of Seven Stars (1924)
- Hard Wood (1925)
- Renegade (1926)
- In the Year 2000 (1928, serial form only)
- Forgotten Island (1931)

=== Collections ===
- Amazon Nights: Classic Adventure Tales from the Pulps (Wildside Press, 2005, ISBN 978-0-809562169)
- Amazon Stories. Volume I, Pedro & Lourenço (Off-Trail Publications, 2008, ISBN 978-0-9786836-8-9)
- Amazon Stories. Volume 2, Pedro & Lourenço (Off-Trail Publications, 2009, ISBN 978-1-9350-3106-2)
- Black Hawk and Other Tales of the Amazon: The Adventures of Pedro and Lourenço (Wildside Press, 2010, ISBN 978-1-4344-0725-2)

An unabridged audiobook of Amazon Nights: Classic Adventure Tales from the Pulps read by Tony Scheinman was released in 2012.
