= Plenty Horses =

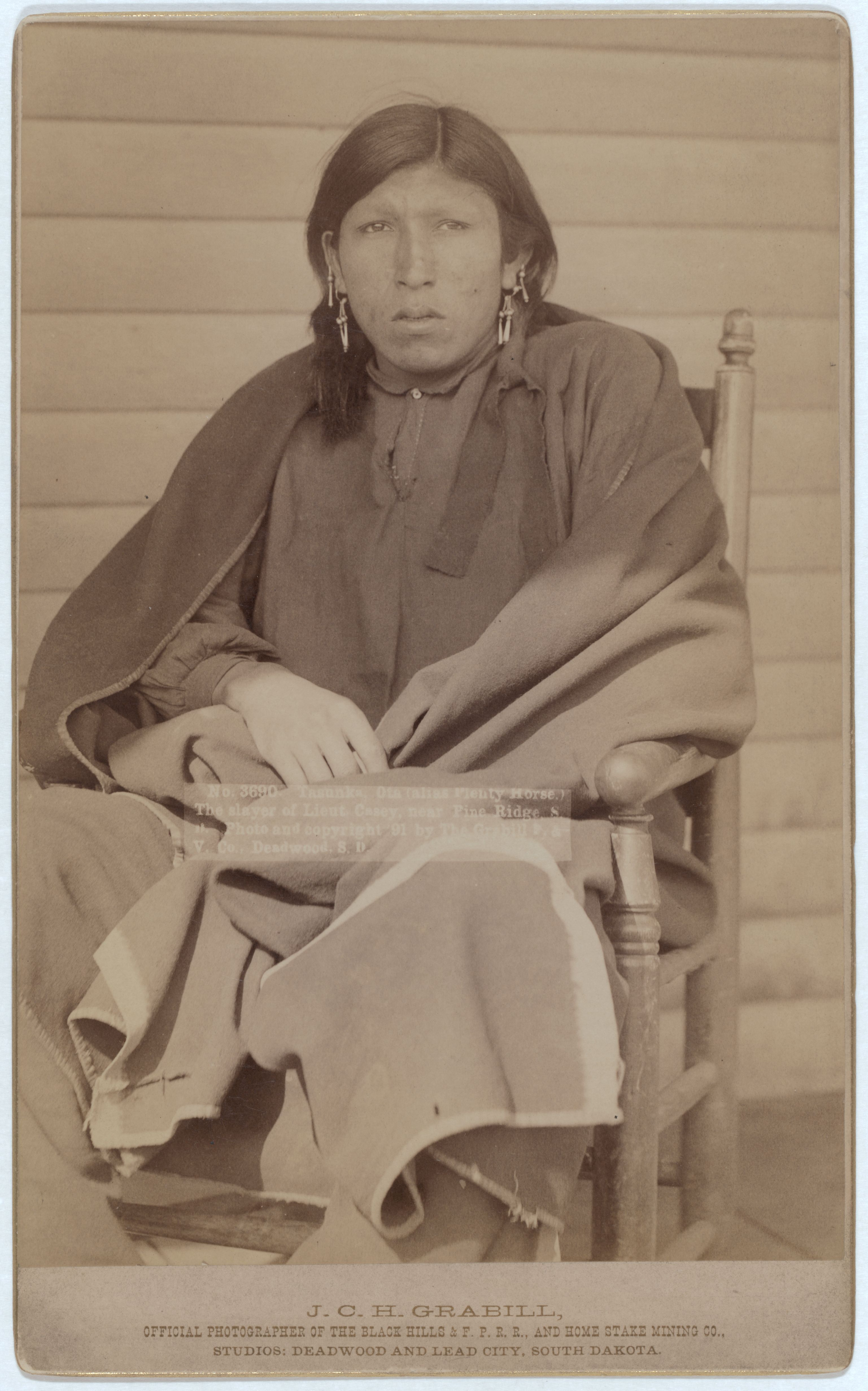
Plenty Horses

Plenty Horses (Lakota: Tȟašúŋka or Tȟašúŋke Óta, lit. ''His-Horses-Are-Plentiful''; 1869–1933) was a Sicangu (Brulé) Lakota from the Rosebud Indian Reservation. On January 7, 1891, nine days after the Wounded Knee Massacre, he shot and killed Army Lieutenant Edward W. Casey, commandant of the Cheyenne Scouts (designated Troop L, Eighth Cavalry) two miles north of the Stronghold Table in the Badlands of the Pine Ridge Indian Reservation in South Dakota. Plenty Horses – who was present at the Drexel Mission Fight the day after the Wounded Knee Massacre, was arrested for the murder and his case went to trial. His defense was he shot and killed Casey as an effort to redeem himself in the eyes of his people after having spent five years at the Carlisle Indian School learning the ways of the white man. He returned in time to be present on the reservation during the massacre.

Five years I attended Carlisle and was educated in the ways of the white man. When I returned to my people, I was an outcast among them. I was no longer an Indian. I was not a white man. I was lonely. I shot the lieutenant so I might make a place for myself among my people. I am now one of them. I shall be hung, and the Indians will bury me as a warrior.

The trial of Plenty Horses, which took place at Fort Meade near Sturgis, figured prominently in the investigation of the events surrounding the Wounded Knee Massacre, specifically as to whether Spotted Elk's band were considered to be prisoners of war. The central argument of Plenty Horses’ two lawyers, George Nock and David Powers, was that a state of war existed between the United States and the Lakota Nation and as such the belligerents were entitled to kill each other without threat of criminal penalty. In such a case, Plenty Horses should not be tried for murder. They also submitted that if the prosecution was correct that there was no state of war between the Lakota and the United States, then the US soldiers involved with the killings at Wounded Knee should also be charged with murder.

It was in the government’s interest that the Lakota killed at Wounded Knee be considered as combatants and prisoners of war who rose up in armed resistance. On May 28, 1891, Oliver Perry Shiras, the presiding judge in the case, halted the proceedings and instructed the jury to find that a state of war did exist at the time of the killing between the Lakota and the United States and that the skirmishes between the Lakota warriors and the U.S. Army were actually battles. As Judge Shiras stated on record; "If they were not it would be hard to justify the killings of the Indians at Wounded Knee and other places".

General Nelson A. Miles would state publicly that a state of war did exist at the time. An unexpected witness for the defense at the trial of Plenty Horses was Captain Frank D. Baldwin, a member of Miles’s staff, who was already in the state, having gone to Pierre to urge the governor to ban the sale of weapons to Indians, which the legislature had failed to do.

Baldwin’s testimony supported the main assertion of the defense; that Plenty Horses had killed Casey as the officer was spying on the Indian encampment on the Stronghold Table.

As a result of the finding that a state of war did exist, Plenty Horses escaped conviction for murder and was released, thereby helping to exonerate the soldiers of the Seventh Cavalry, the perpetrators of the Wounded Knee Massacre, none of whom was ever charged.

After the trial he came to public attention only once more, appearing at the South Dakota stand of the World's Columbian Exposition at Chicago of 1893. He then disappeared into obscurity, but lived on until 1933 on the Rosebud Reservation, where he married and raised children.

== Bibliography ==
- Roger L. Di Silvestro: In the Shadow of Wounded Knee: The Untold Final Story of the Indian Wars
- EDWARD S. ELLIS, M.A: THE PEOPLES STANDARD HISTORY OF THE UNITED STATES
