= Lewis Patrick Greene =

English writer (1891–1971)

Lewis Patrick Greene (1891–1971), who usually wrote under the name L. Patrick Greene, was an English writer of adventure stories.

Greene was born in England. He spent several years in Rhodesia working as a civil servant, before a back injury caused him to be deemed medically unfit for service and discharged. By 1913, Greene had emigrated to the US and became an American citizen settling in Boston.

== Writing career ==
In 1918, Greene began to write fiction based on his experiences for the pulp magazines. Initially, his main American market was Adventure magazine. For Adventure, Greene created his most famous character, the "Major", the alias of English adventurer Aubrey St. John Major. An eccentric Englishman whose foppish behaviour disguised a clever and heroic character, the Major, aided by his Khoikhoi friend Jim, worked as an illicit diamond buyer, illegally trading diamonds in South Africa. Despite his criminal status, the Major and Jim often intervened to help the innocent and bring criminals to justice.

For a time, Greene worked as Assistant Editor on Adventure and was not allowed to write fiction for it. He then began selling fiction to other pulp magazines, especially Short Stories, (where he transferred the Major series). Green became one of Short Stories' most frequent and most popular contributors.

Other publications Greene wrote for included Action Stories, Argosy, Blue Book and Everybody's Magazine.

For his nephews, Greene wrote a children's book, Tabu Dick (1933). This revolved around the adventures of a Tarzan-like boy in Africa.

== Bibliography ==
- The Major-Diamond Buyer (1926)
- The Devil's Kloof (1928)
- The Red Idol (1928)
- Major Adventures (1928)
- Dynamite Drury (1929)
- The Major-Knight Errant (1929)
- Dynamite Drury Again (1930)
- The Flame (1930)
- Major Exploits (1930)
- Major Developments (1931)
- Sergeant Lancey Reports (1931)
- Major Occasions (1931)
- Murder Beacon (with Walter S. Masterman) (1932)
- Forbidden Valley (1932)
- Major Hazards (1932)
- Tug Of War (1932)
- Tabu Dick (1933)
- Sergeant Lancey Carries On (1933)
- Sergeant Whatisname (1933)
- The Point Of A Thousand Spears (1934)
- Just Vengeance (1934)
- The Lake of the Dead (1935)
- White Man's Stride (1936)
- Trooper Useless (1936)
- Black Tide Rising (1936)
- Not So Useless (1938)
- Drums Call The Major (1938)
- Escape From Liberty (1939)
- Face Value (1939)
- Trooper Takes Command (1940)
- The Great Tabu: Adventures of Tabu Dick (1940)
- Treasure Valley (1940)
- Swordsman Of Fortune (1943)
- Dynamite Drury Patrols (1946)
- Sergeant Lancey Tells The Tale (1947)
- Fire, and Other Stories of the Major (Chapbook) (2000)
- Witchcraft (Chapbook) (2002)
- L. Patrick Greene's Tales of the Jungle (Chapbook) (2005)
- Complete Adventures of the Major 6 volumes so far (2013-2024)
