= Adventure (magazine) =

American pulp magazine

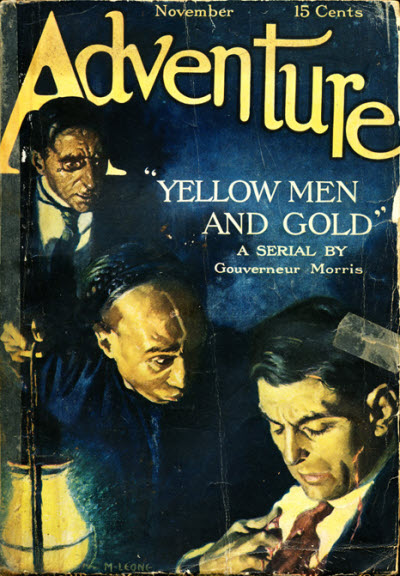
- Cover of the first issue, November 1910
- Former editors: Trumbull White (1910–1912) Arthur Sullivant Hoffman (1912–1927); Joseph Cox (1927); Anthony Rud (1927–1930); Albert A. Proctor (1930–1934); William Corcoran (1934); Howard V. L. Bloomfield (1934–1940); Kenneth S. White (1941–1948); Kendall Goodwyn (1949–1951); Ejler Jakobsson (1951–1953); Alden Norton (1954–1964); Peter Gannett (1965–1970) Carson Bingham (1970–1971)
- Categories: Pulp magazine
- Circulation: 300,000
- First issue: November 1910
- Final issue Number: 1971; 881 issues

Adventure was an American pulp magazine that was first published in November 1910 by the Ridgway company, a subsidiary of the Butterick Publishing Company. Adventure went on to become one of the most profitable and critically acclaimed of all the American pulp magazines. The magazine had 881 issues. Its first editor was Trumbull White. He was succeeded in 1912 by Arthur Sullivant Hoffman (1876–1966), who edited the magazine until 1927.

== The Hoffman era ==
In its first decade, Adventure carried fiction from such notable writers as Rider Haggard, Rafael Sabatini, Gouverneur Morris, Baroness Orczy, Damon Runyon and William Hope Hodgson. Subsequently, the magazine cultivated its own group of authors (who Hoffman dubbed his "Writers' Brigade"). Each member of the "Writer's Brigade" had his or her own particular fictional bailiwicks. These included Talbot Mundy (colonial India and ancient Rome), T.S. Stribling (detective stories), Arthur O. Friel (South America), brothers Patrick and Terence Casey ("hobo" stories), J. Allan Dunn (the South Seas), Harold Lamb (medieval Europe and Asia), Hapsburg Liebe (Westerns), Gordon Young (South Pacific stories and urban thrillers), Arthur D. Howden Smith (Viking era and US history), H. Bedford-Jones (historical warfare), W.C. Tuttle (humorous Westerns), Gordon MacCreagh (Burma and East Africa), Henry S. Whitehead (the Virgin Islands), Hugh Pendexter (US history), Robert J. Pearsall (China), and L. Patrick Greene (Southern Africa).

In 1912, Hoffman and his assistant, the novelist Sinclair Lewis created a popular identity card with a serial number for readers. If the bearer were killed, someone finding the card would notify the magazine who would in turn notify the next of kin of the hapless adventurer. The popularity of the card amongst travelers led to the formation of the Adventurers' Club of New York. The original New York club led to similar clubs in Chicago (1913), Los Angeles (1921), Copenhagen (1937) and Honolulu (1955).

In 1915 the publishers attempted to reach women readers with a new title (Stories of Life, Love, and Adventure), but it went back to its male readership and original title in 1917.

Hoffman also was secretary of an organization named the "Legion" that had Theodore Roosevelt Jr. as one of its vice presidents. Membership cards of the organization included member's skills and specialties that were forwarded to the War Department when the United States entered World War I, the information being eventually used to create two regiments of aviation mechanics. Hoffman's group would later provide a model for the organization of the American Legion after the war.

Adventure's letters page, "The Camp-Fire" featured Hoffman's editorials, background by the authors to their stories and discussions by the readers. At Hoffman's suggestion, a number of Camp-Fire Stations – locations where other readers of Adventure could meet up – were established. Robert Kenneth Jones notes that Adventure readers "often wrote in to report on meeting new friends through these stations." By 1924, there were Camp-Fire Stations established across the US and in several other countries, including Britain, Australia, Egypt and Cuba. Adventure also offered Camp-Fire buttons which readers wore. Adventure featured several other notable columns, including:

- "Ask Adventure" that called on the resources of 98 experts to answer various questions including the status of slavery in Ethiopia, whether Gila monster bites are fatal and the fighting merits of lions and gorillas. Several of Adventure's fiction writers also wrote material for this column on their respective areas of expertise, including Gordon MacCreagh (questions about Asia), Captain A. E. Dingle (Indian and Atlantic Oceans) and George E. Holt (Africa).
- "Lost Trails", which helped people locate missing relatives and friends.
- "Old Songs Men Have Sung", by Robert W. Gordon, which was dedicated to discussing American folk-songs. Gordon would later run the Archive of American Folk Song at the Library of Congress.

Hoffman encouraged the details of his writers' fiction to be as factually accurate as possible-mistakes would frequently be pointed out and criticized by the magazine's readers.

In addition, Adventure under Hoffman also showcased the work of several famous artists, including Rockwell Kent, John R. Neill (who illustrated several Harold Lamb stories), Charles Livingston Bull, H.C. Murphy and Edgar Franklin Wittmack. Under Hoffman's editorship, Adventure's circulation reached a height of 300,000 copies per month. By 1924, Adventure was regarded, in the words of Richard Bleiler, as "without question the most important 'pulp' magazine in the world."

In 1926, the Butterick company decided to print Adventure on slick paper instead of wood-pulp paper. They also changed the magazine's covers to a text listing of contents. Both of these decisions were done in the hope of winning over readers of the "slick" magazines, such as The Atlantic and Harper's Magazine. However, the magazine's style of fiction did not change, and the new Adventure failed to win over "slick" magazine readers, instead suffering a twenty percent fall in circulation. Hoffman, unhappy with the change of format, left the magazine in 1927.

== Later years ==
After Hoffman's departure, his successors usually followed the template for the magazine that he had set down. In 1934, Adventure was bought by Popular Publications. Throughout the 1930s, Adventure included fiction by Erle Stanley Gardner, Donald Barr Chidsey, Raymond S. Spears, Major Malcolm Wheeler-Nicholson, Luke Short, and Major George Fielding Eliot. Adventure continued to publish factual pieces by noted figures, including future film producer Val Lewton and Venezuelan military writer Rafael de Nogales. In November 1935, editor Howard Bloomfield assembled a special issue to celebrate Adventure's 25th anniversary. This issue featured reminiscences of the magazine's history by Arthur Sullivant Hoffman. The issue also featured reprints of popular Adventure stories by Mundy, Friel, Tuttle and Georges Surdez. The anniversary of the magazine was covered in the media, with Time magazine praising Adventure as being "the No. 1 'pulp'" and Newsweek lauding Adventure as "Dean of the pulps".

During the 1940s, the magazine carried numerous fiction and articles concerned with the ongoing Second World War; writers who contributed to Adventure in this period included E. Hoffmann Price, De Witt Newbury, Jim Kjelgaard and Fredric Brown. Artists on the publication during the 1930s and 1940s included Walter M. Baumhofer, Hubert Rogers, Rafael De Soto, Lawrence Sterne Stevens and Norman Saunders. The magazine's main editor in the 1940s was Kenneth S. White, the son of the magazine's first editor Trumbull White. In April 1953, the pulp changed its format to that of a men's adventure magazine that lasted until the magazine folded in 1971. This final incarnation of Adventure tends not to be highly regarded among magazine historians, with Robert Weinberg referring to it as "a rather mundane slick magazine" and Richard Bleiler stating that by 1960 Adventure had become "a dying embarrassment, printing grainy black and white photos of semi-nude women". Nevertheless, this version of Adventure did sometimes publish fiction by noted authors, including Arthur C. Clarke ("Armaments Race", in the April 1954 issue) and Norman Mailer ("The Paper House" in the December 1958 issue). The final four issues restored the fiction emphasis in a digest format, but that incarnation also folded.

== Anthologies and reprint collections ==
General anthologies from Adventure:

- Adventure's Best Stories: 1926. Edited by Arthur Sullivant Hoffman. George H. Doran Company, 1926.
- The Best of Adventure, Volume One: 1910–1912. Edited by Doug Ellis. Black Dog Books, 2010.
- The Best of Adventure, Volume Two: 1913–1914. Edited by Doug Ellis. Black Dog Books, 2012.
- The Camp-Fire: The Complete Correspondence From the Pages of Adventure, 1918-1920. Edited by Arthur Sullivant Hoffman. Steeger Books, 2023.

Single author/team collections from Adventure:

- Angellotti, Marion Polk. The Black Death. Black Dog Books, 2010.
- Beadle, Charles. The City of Baal. Off-Trail Publications, 2006.
- Beadle, Charles. The Land of Ophir. Off-Trail Publications, 2012.
- Bedford-Jones, H. & W.C. Robertson. The Temple of the Ten. Donald M. Grant, 1973.
- Bishop, Farnham & Brodeur, Arthur Gilchrist. In the Grip of the Minotaur. Black Dog Books, 2010.
- Brodeur, Arthur Gilchrist. The Adventures of Faidit and Cercamon. Altus Press, 2014.
- Casey, Patrick & Terence. Hobo Stories. Off-Trail Publications, 2010.
- Couzens, H. D. King Corrigan's Treasure. Black Dog Books, 2011.
- Dunn, J. Allan. Barehanded Castaways. Murania Press, 2019
- Dunn, J. Allan. The Island. Murania Press, 2015
- Dunn, J. Allan. Three South Seas Novels. Off-Trail Publications, 2012.
- Friel, Arthur O. Amazon Nights: Classic Adventure Tales From the Pulps. Wildside Press, 2005.
- Friel, Arthur O.. Black Hawk and Other Tales of the Amazon. Wildside Press, 2010.
- Friel, Arthur O.. Amazon Stories: Volumes 1 & 2: Pedro & Lourenço. Off-Trail Publications, 2008 & 2009.
- Holt, George E. The Decree of Allah. Black Dog Books, 2010.
- Lamb, Harold. Wolf of the Steppes. Bison Books, 2006.
- Lamb, Harold. Warriors of the Steppes. Bison Books, 2006.
- Lamb, Harold. Riders of the Steppes. Bison Books, 2007.
- Lamb, Harold. Swords of the Steppes. Bison Books, 2007.
- Lamb, Harold. Swords from the Desert. Bison Books, 2009.
- Lamb, Harold. Swords from the West. Bison Books, 2009.
- Lamb, Harold. Swords from the East. Bison Books, 2010.
- Lamb, Harold. Swords from the Sea. Bison Books, 2010.
- MacCreagh, Gordon. The Lost End of Nowhere: The Complete Tales of Kingi Bwana, Volume 1. Altus Press, 2014.
- MacCreagh, Gordon. Unprofitable Ivory: The Complete Tales of Kingi Bwana, Volume 2. Altus Press, 2014.
- MacCreagh, Gordon. Black Drums Talking: The Complete Tales of Kingi Bwana, Volume 3. Altus Press, 2014.
- MacCreagh, Gordon. Blood and Steel: The Complete Tales of Kingi Bwana, Volume 4. Altus Press, 2014.
- Mundy, Talbot. In a Righteous Cause. Black Dog Books, 2009.
- Mundy, Talbot. The Letter of His Orders. Black Dog Books, 2010.
- Mundy, Talbot. A Soldier and a Gentleman. Black Dog Books, 2011.
- Mundy, Talbot. The Complete Up and Down the Earth Tales. Altus Press, 2018.
- Mundy, Talbot. Yasmini the Incomparable. Murania Press, 2019.
- Mundy, Talbot. The Complete Anthony of Arran. Steeger Books. 2022
- Mundy, Talbot. Golden River: The Complete Adventures of Ben Quorn, Volume 1. Steeger Books, 2024.
- Pearsall, Robert J. The Complete Adventures of Hazard & Partridge. Altus Press, 2013.
- Small, Sidney Herschel. Beyond the Call of Duty: The Complete Tales of Koropok, Volume 1. Altus Press, 2015.
- Small, Sidney Herschel. The Scorpion Scar: The Complete Tales of Koropok, Volume 2. Altus Press, 2015.
- Smith, Arthur D. Howden. Grey Maiden: The Story of a Sword Through the Ages, The Complete Saga. Altus Press, 2014.
- Smith, Arthur D. Howden. Swain’s Vengeance : The Saga of Swain the Viking, Volume 1. DMR Books, 2022.
- Smith, Arthur D. Howden. Swain’s Chase : The Saga of Swain the Viking, Volume 2. DMR Books, 2022.
- Smith, Arthur D. Howden. Swain Kingsbane : The Saga of Swain the Viking, Volume 3. DMR Books, 2023.
- Smith, Arthur D. Howden. Swain’s Justice : The Saga of Swain the Viking, Volume 4. DMR Books, 2023.
- Stribling, T. S. Clues of the Caribbees: Being Certain Criminal Investigations of Henry Poggioli, Ph.D. Doubleday, Doran & company, inc. (1929). Reprinted in 1977 by Dover Publications.
- Stribling, T. S. Web of the Sun Black Dog Books, 2012.
- Young, Gordon. Savages. Murania Press, 2011.
- Young, Gordon. Everhard: Volume 1. Steeger Books, 2024.
- Young, Gordon. Everhard: Volume 2. Steeger Books, 2025.
