= Sing Sing Nights (film) =

1934 film by Lewis D. Collins

- Directed by: Lewis D. Collins
- Written by: Charles Logue (additional dialogue); Marion Orth (screenplay)
- Based on: Sing Sing Nights (novel) by Harry Stephen Keeler
- Produced by: Paul Malvern (producer)
- Starring: See below
- Cinematography: Archie Stout
- Edited by: Carl Pierson
- Production company: Monogram Pictures
- Release date: 1934
- Running time: 60 minutes
- Country: United States
- Language: English

Sing Sing Nights is a 1934 American film directed by Lewis D. Collins, based on the 1927 novel by American Author Harry Stephen Keeler.

== Plot ==
Three men have been convicted of the same murder of the, admittedly, quite reprehensible Floyd Cooper, and sit on death row awaiting execution the following morning. However, only one bullet could have struck the victim first, so only one of the three men is actually guilty of murder, since "the other two shot into a corpse," and so must be innocent; but which two? Professor Varney's machine, a kind of lie detector, will determine who is guilty as each man tells the story of how he came to know, hate, and kill the victim.

== Cast ==
- Conway Tearle as Floyd Cooper
- Ferdinand Gottschalk as Prof. Varney
- Hardie Albright as Howard Trude
- Jameson Thomas as Robert McCaigh
- Berton Churchill as Gov. Duane
- Boots Mallory as Ellen Croft
- Mary Doran as Anne McCaigh
- Henry Kolker as Kurt Nordon
- Lotus Long as Li Sung
- Richard Tucker as Attorney General
- George Baxter as Sergei Krenwicz
