= Singapore Sammy =

Fictional character

Singapore Sammy is a fictional pulp character written by George F. Worts, primarily for Argosy, one of his primary markets for fiction. The adventures of Sammy Shay are one of the shorter adventure series characters which Worts wrote (although he penned shorter series, such as his interconnected novelettes which took place in a fictional Florida town called Vingo which were also published in Argosy).

Most of Worts' Singapore Sammy stories appeared in Argosy, although there were additional installments in other magazines. Singapore Sammy also made a cameo appearance in Worts' novel, Five Who Vanished, as a crane operator and engineer assigned to a defense project in World War II-era Hawaii.

== Synopsis ==
Sailor Sammy Shay roamed the South Seas on a quest to locate his father, who possessed the only copy of a will which left all of his wealth to Sammy alone. The series was well regarded in the Argosy letters column of the time. These stories take place in the South Seas, where Worts had worked as a telegraph operator on the Chinese trade route.

The Singapore Sammy series is similar to Worts' other Far East-located adventure series for Argosy, Peter the Brazen, which was serialized in that magazine during the same time.

== List of stories ==
Story Title	Magazine	Dates
"The Blue Fire Pearl"	Short Stories	March 10, 1928
"Cobra"	Short Stories	May 25, 1928
"South of Sulu"	Short Stories	June 25, 1928
"The Pink Elephant"	Short Stories	October 25, 1928
"Octopus"	Short Stories	May 10, 1929
"Singapore Sammy" (2 parts)	Argosy	December 12, 19, 1931
"The Python Pit" (3 parts)	Argosy	May 6, 13, 20, 1933
"Isle of the Meteor"	Argosy	August 19, 1933
"Buddha’s Whisker"	Argosy	May 26, 1934
"The Monster of the Lagoon" (6 parts)	Argosy	February 23 and March 2, 9, 16, 23, 30, 1935
"Shark Bait" (3 parts)	Argosy	June 22, 29 and July 5, 1935
"Murderer’s Paradise"	Argosy	May 16, 23, 30 and June 6, 13, 20, 1936
"Five Who Vanished" (10 parts)	Collier's	December 26, 1942, January 9, 16, 23, 30 and February 6, 13, 20, 27, 1943
