= Walter S. Masterman =

British writer (1876–1946)

- Born: Walter Sydney Masterman; 19 December 1876; Wimbledon, London, United Kingdom
- Died: 18 May 1946 (aged 69); Brighton, United Kingdom
- Education: Christ's College, Cambridge
- Occupation: Author

Walter (Sydney) Masterman (19 December 1876 – 18 May 1946) was an English author of mystery, fantasy, horror and science fiction.

== Biography ==
Masterman was born in Wimbledon, London on 19 December 1876, the son of Thomas William Masterman. Initially educated at Tonbridge School and Weymouth College, he entered Christ's College, Cambridge in 1897, where he was a football blue.

He joined the British Army and served as a lieutenant in the 3rd (Royal Glamorgan Militia) Battalion, Welsh Regiment, in the Second Boer War, 1900–02; was made a captain in 1901. He was the joint headmaster of Horsmonden School, Kent, 1903-05. He also served in the Great War as a Major with the Welsh Regiment (1914–19).

He played football with his brother H W Masterman for amongst others Tunbridge Wells and is referred to in the "History of the Football Association" published in 1953 for an article he wrote in 1911 on the dispute between the Amateur Football Association and the Football Association.

== Death ==
Masterman died in Brighton on 18 May 1946.

== Bibliography ==
- The Wrong Letter (1926)
- The Curse of the Reckaviles (1927)
- 2. L.O. (1928)
- The Green Toad (1929)
- The Yellow Mistletoe (1930)
- The Mystery of 52 (aka The Mystery of Fifty-Two) (1931)
- The Tangle (1931) [a romance novel]
- The Flying Beast (1932)
- Murder Beacon (1932), written with L. Patrick Greene
- The Nameless Crime (1932)
- The Baddington Horror (1934)
- The Rose of Death (1934)
- The Perjured Alibi (1935)
- Death Turns Traitor (1935)
- The Bloodhounds Bay (1936)
- The Avenger Strikes (1936)
- The Border Line (1936)
- The Wrong Verdict (1937)
- The Hunted Man (1938)
- The Secret of the Downs (1938)
- The Hooded Monster (1939)
- The Curse of Cantire (1939)
- The Death Coins (1940)
- Back From the Grave (1940)
- The Silver Leopard (1941)
- The Man without a Head (1942)
