= F. Richard Jones =

American film director and producer (1893–1930)

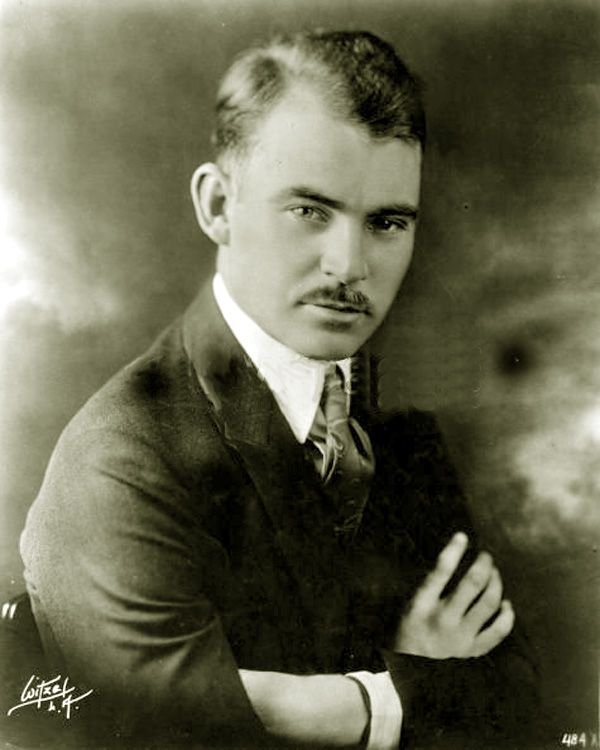
- F. Richard Jones ca. 1923
- Born: Frank Richard Jones; 7 September 1893; St. Louis, Missouri, U.S.
- Died: 14 December 1930 (aged 37); Los Angeles, California, U.S.
- Occupations: Film director, screenwriter, producer
- Years active: 1909–1930
- Spouse(s): Three, including Irene Lentz

Frank Richard Jones (September 7, 1893 – December 14, 1930) was an American director, screenwriter, and producer.

== Early life and career ==
Born in St. Louis, Missouri, Dick Jones was sixteen years old when he became involved in the fledgling film industry in his hometown with the Atlas film company. A technician, Jones worked in the film laboratory and other departments but his real interest lay behind the camera, creating the visual product. With the industry's shift to Hollywood, in 1915 he joined Mack Sennett at his Keystone Studios where he put together a few scripts and was given the opportunity to direct. Initially his directorial work was difficult but he dedicated himself to learning the job. Jones first came to prominence when Mabel Normand promoted him to co-direct the troubled feature Mickey (released 1918). The film was a major success and Normand always credited Jones with having rescued the project. He gained a solid reputation among his peers after directing Mabel Normand in Molly O' (1921). Unfortunately, the film came out after the murder of William Desmond Taylor and many movie-goers boycotted the film because of the negative publicity surrounding Normand's involvement in the matter.

While at Keystone, Dick Jones met and married Irene Lentz, a young actress who would go on to become one of Hollywood's leading costume designers. In 1923 Dick Jones began producing films but after directing and/or producing forty-five films for Keystone, including feature-length productions, in 1925 he was lured away by Hal Roach Studios. Although he directed films for Roach, Dick Jones worked mainly as an executive coordinator, serving as a production supervisor and a supervising director. In 1926, Jones was responsible for signing Mabel Normand to a contract with Roach Studios after health and drug addiction problems had kept the star actress out of films for three years. He would direct or produce Normand in all five of her films made at Roach Studios until her permanent retirement in 1927. As well, during his time with Roach, Jones worked on nineteen different film projects with Stan Laurel. In later years, Laurel would state that it was Dick Jones who taught him everything about comedy filmmaking.

Leaving Roach Studios at the end of 1927, Jones directed Douglas Fairbanks in the highly acclaimed adventure epic The Gaucho. Now much in demand for his skills and filmmaking versatility, in 1928 Jones signed on with Paramount Pictures where he directed three productions – including The Water Hole (1928) with Nancy Carroll – before accepting an offer from producer Samuel Goldwyn in 1929 to direct talking films. Dick Jones' first talkie was a mystery/thriller starring Ronald Colman and Joan Bennett titled Bulldog Drummond (1929). At a time when a number of prominent silent film directors could not make the transition to sound, Jones' first effort was heralded for its quality and his future looked bright.

== Illness and death ==
However, Jones soon fell ill, possibly from tuberculosis that ravaged Los Angeles in the early 1930s and that would claim the lives of stars such as Normand and Renée Adorée.

F. Richard Jones died in 1930 at the age of thirty-seven. He left behind a widow, designer Irene Lentz, two former wives, Carol and Josephine, and a daughter, Dickey. He is interred in the Great Mausoleum, Florentine Columbarium, at Forest Lawn Memorial Park Cemetery in Glendale, California. Following the 1962 suicide of his wife Irene, she was interred next to him.

== Selected filmography ==
- Mickey (1918)
- Yankee Doodle in Berlin (1919)
- Love, Honor and Behave (1920)
- Molly O (1921)
- The Crossroads of New York (1922)
- The Country Flapper (1922)
- Suzanna (1923)
- The Extra Girl (1923)
- No Man's Law (1927)
- The Gaucho (1927)
- The Water Hole (1928)
- Bulldog Drummond (1929)
