= Francis M. Nevins =

American novelist

- Born: Francis Michael Nevins, Jr. January 6, 1943 (age 83); Bayonne, New Jersey
- Education: St. Peter's College, Bachelor of Arts
- Alma mater: NYU School of Law, Juris Doctor
- Occupations: Author, law professor
- Writing career
- Pen name: Francis M. Nevins Jr.
- Notable awards: Edgar Awards; 1975 Royal Bloodline: Ellery Queen, Author and Detective; 1989 Cornell Woolrich: First You Dream, Then You Die

Francis Michael Nevins Jr. (born January 6, 1943) is an American mystery writer, attorney, and professor of law at Saint Louis University School of Law. He has also written a number of non-fiction works, including book-length studies of the life and works of Ellery Queen and of Cornell Woolrich, each of which earned the author an Edgar Award.

== Early life and career ==
Born in Bayonne, New Jersey, and raised in Roselle Park, Nevins earned a Bachelor of Arts in 1964 from Saint Peter's College (since renamed as Saint Peter's University) and a Juris Doctor from New York University School of Law in 1967. He passed the bar in New Jersey that same year, and, as of 1970, was a staff attorney for Middlesex County Legal Services. The following year, Nevins joined the faculty of the St. Louis University School of Law.

1971 also saw the publication of Nevins' first book, Nightwebs: A Collection of Short Stories by Cornell Woolrich, a book "not to be missed," according to Chicago Tribune critic Alice Cromie, who also notes that "the appended comprehensive checklist of Woolrich works, compiled by Woolrich, with Harold Knott and William Thailing, is by itself worth the price of the book to suspense collectors." Also featured is an introductory biographical essay by Nevins.

In 1975, Nevins received a special Edgar Award for Royal Bloodline; Ellery Queen, Author and Detective, a study dealing with both the authors—Fred Dannay and Manfred Bennington Lee—and the protagonist of the Ellery Queen novels. In 1989, he was awarded the Edgar for best biographical or critical study for his book, Cornell Woolrich: First You Dream, Then You Die.

Nevins' short story "After the Twelfth Chapter"—initially published in the September 1972 issue of Ellery Queen's Mystery Magazine—was included in Allen Hubin's Best Detective Stories of the Year, 1973. Hubin also included Nevins stories in the anthology's 1975 and 1979 editions.

== Partial bibliography ==
=== Novels ===
- Publish and Perish (1975)
- Corrupt and Ensnare (1978)
- The 120-Hour Clock (1986)
- The Ninety Million Dollar Mouse (1987)
- Into the Same River Twice (1996)
- Beneficiaries' Requiem (2000)

=== Short stories ===
- Night of Silken Snow and Other Stories (2001)
- Leap Day and Other Stories (2003)
- Night Forms 2010

=== Non-Fiction ===
- Royal Bloodline; Ellery Queen, Author and Detective (1973)
- Cornell Woolrich: First You Dream, Then You Die (1988)
- The Films of Hopalong Cassidy (1988)
- The Films of The Cisco Kid
- Joseph H. Lewis (1998)
- Paul Landres : A Director's Stories (2000)
- The Anthony Boucher Chronicles: Reviews and Commentary 1942-47 (2009)
- Cornucopia of Crime: Memories and Summations (2010)
- Ellery Queen: The Art of Detection: The story of how two fractious cousins reshaped the modern detective novel (2013)
- Judges & Justice and Lawyers & Law: Exploring the Legal Dimensions of Fiction and Film (2014)
- They Called the Shots : Action Directors from Late Silents to the Late Sixties (2016)

=== Edited by ===
- Nightwebs: A Collection of Short Stories by Cornell Woolrich (1971)
