= King of the Khyber Rifles (film) =

1953 film by Henry King

- Directed by: Henry King
- Written by: Ivan Goff and Ben Roberts (screenplay); Harry Kleiner (story)
- Based on: King of the Khyber Rifles; 1916 novel by Talbot Mundy
- Produced by: Frank P. Rosenberg
- Starring: Tyrone Power; Terry Moore
- Cinematography: Leon Shamroy
- Edited by: Barbara McLean
- Music by: Bernard Herrmann
- Distributed by: Twentieth Century Fox
- Release date: December 22, 1953
- Running time: 100 minutes
- Country: United States
- Language: English
- Budget: $2,190,000
- Box office: $2.6 million (US/Canada rentals); $3.5 million (foreign rentals)

King of the Khyber Rifles is a 1953 war film directed by Henry King and starring Tyrone Power and Terry Moore. The film shares its title but little else with the novel King of the Khyber Rifles: A Romance of Adventure (1916) by Talbot Mundy. This novel was also the basis for John Ford's The Black Watch (1929). The Khyber Pass scenes were shot in the Alabama Hills, Lone Pine, California. Released by 20th Century Fox, the film was one of the first shot in Technicolor CinemaScope.

== Plot ==
In 1857, freshly-arrived Sandhurst-trained Captain Alan King, survives an attack on his escort to his North-West Frontier Province garrison near the Khyber Pass because of Ahmed, a native Afridi deserter from the Muslim fanatic rebel Karram Khan's forces. King was born locally and speaks Pashto. As soon as his fellow officers learn that his mother was a native Muslim (which got his parents disowned even by their own families), he encounters prejudiced discrimination, including Lieutenant Geoffrey Heath moving out of their quarters.

Brigadier General J. R. Maitland, whose policy is full equality among whites, learns that King was raised with Karram Khan, and charges him with training and commanding a native unit, the Khyber Rifles. The general's daughter, Susan Maitland, falls in love with King, but the general decides to send her home to England after a kidnap attempt which is foiled by King. King volunteers to engage Karram Khan, the only man who can bring the normally divided local tribes together in revolt, pretending to have deserted.

King arrives in Khyber Pass, telling Karram he has deserted. He asks to serve him. Karram welcomes him. They reminisce about their childhood. Karram receives word that the rifle shipment was empty. Karram asks him about why he lied to him. Alan tells him he deserted because he could no longer stay with the British. Karram asks about Susan and his feelings. Alan admits he loves her.

Alan tries to kill Karram with a knife while he was asleep. However, he hesitates and Karram wakes up, pulling a gun on Alan. Karram takes him prisoner.

Alan is tied to a post with the other British officers who are prisoners. Karram's people throw spears and kills all the officers except Alan. He releases Alan, as Alan spared his life. Alan returns and advises General Maitland what happened. The General places him under house arrest. Heath tells Alan that Susan left earlier with all the women and that she feels the same about him.

The Colonel receives word that there is an uprising. He expects an attack and plans to send his forces out first. The Khybers refuse to use the new Enfield rifles, as the cartridges use grease and they have to bite off the end, therefore they are taking pig grease into their bodies, which breaks a religious prohibition. Alan loads an Enfield, and as he is half-Muslim, is able to demonstrate using the rifle is not in opposition to their religion.

While on Khyber Pass, the Khyber Rifles decide they can't use them. They will fight with their knives. Alan and the Khyber Rifles attack Karram's people. Alan jumps through the roof of Karram's tent. They struggle with a knife and just as Karram is about to kill Alan, one of the Khyber Rifles throws a knife in his back.

The Khyber Rifles win the battle and return to the fort. The General accepts Alan, guaranteeing a future for him and Susan.

== Cast ==
- Tyrone Power as Captain Alan King
- Terry Moore as Susan Maitland
- Michael Rennie as Brigadier General J.R. Maitland
- Murray Matheson as Major Ian MacAllister
- Gavin Muir as Major Lee
- John Justin as Lieutenant Geoffrey Heath
- Richard Wyler as Lieutenant Ben Baird
- John Farrow as Corporal Stuart
- Guy Rolfe as Karram Khan
- Frank DeKova as Ali Nur
- Argentina Brunetti as Lali
- Sujata as Native Dancer
- Frank Lacteen as Ahmed

== Development ==
Fox announced plans to remake the film in 1938. They were going to make it with Richard Greene or Victor McLaglen, but plans were pushed back because of the start of World War II.

In 1951 the project was reactivated as a vehicle for Tyrone Power. Walter Doniger was to write the script and Frank Rosenberg was to produce. By December Henry Hathaway was listed as director.

In January 1953 Fox announced the film would be one of a series of "super specials" the studio would make in CinemaScope.

In April 1953 Henry King was given the job of directing and Power was confirmed as star. Guy Rolfe signed in June.

Filming started 14 July in Lone Pine, California. During filming, 22 people were injured when an explosion went off with more force than anticipated.

== Reception ==
=== Release ===
King of the Khyber Rifles opened in theatres on December 22, 1953. It grossed $2.6 million while in US/Canada theatres and $3.5 million overseas.

=== Critical response ===
Variety spotlighted Tyrone Power’s lead performance.
