= Purple Pirate =

1935 novel by Talbot Mundy

- First edition
- Author: Talbot Mundy
- Language: English
- Series: Tros
- Genre: Fantasy novel
- Publisher: Appleton-Century
- Publication date: 1935
- Publication place: United States
- Media type: Print (Hardback)
- Pages: 367
- OCLC: 581460
- Preceded by: Queen Cleopatra

Purple Pirate is a fantasy novel by author Talbot Mundy. It was first published in 1935 by Appleton-Century. Parts of the story appeared in the magazine Adventure.

== Plot introduction ==
The novel concerns the further adventures of Tros of Samathrace who battles intrigue in Cleopatra's court while he woos her sister.

== Reception ==
Galaxy reviewer Floyd C. Gale gave the novel five stars out of five. He noted that the novel avoided the decline in quality he expected in sequels, matching the prior volume in "plot audacity, skill of execution and characterization."

dust-jacket by W.I. van der Poel from the Gnome Press reprint

== Publication history ==
- 1935, US, Appleton-Century, Pub date 1935, Hardback
- 1935, UK, Hutchinson, Pub date 1935, Hardback
- 1959, US, Gnome Press, hardcover
- 1969, US, Cedric Chivers, Ltd, hardcover
- 1970, US, Avon Books, paperback
- 1977, US, Zebra Books, paperback
- 2008, UK, Leonaur Books, paperback
