= Elizabeth McQueen =

Elizabeth McQueen or MacQueen may refer to:

- Elizabeth Lippincott McQueen (1878–1958), founder of the Women's International Association of Aeronautics
- Elizabeth McQueen, vocalist with the western swing revival band Asleep at the Wheel
- Elizabeth S. MacLeod (born Elizabeth Susan MacQueen, 1842-1939), Scottish-born Canadian poet
