= WIAA =

WIAA may refer to:

- Wisconsin Interscholastic Athletic Association
- Washington Interscholastic Activities Association
- WIAA (FM), a radio station (88.7 FM) licensed to Interlochen, Michigan, United States
- Western India Automobile Association, an automobile association headquartered in Mumbai
- Women's International Association of Aeronautics, founded in 1929 by Elizabeth Lippincott McQueen
