= Talbot Mundy, Philosopher of Adventure =

2005 biography by Brian Taves

- Author: Brian Taves
- Subject: Talbot Mundy
- Publication date: October 2005

Talbot Mundy, Philosopher of Adventure is a 2005 biography of author Talbot Mundy. It was published in October 2005 through McFarland and was written by Brian Taves.

== Synopsis ==
In the biography Taves examines Mundy's physical travels and his philosophical outlook, which shaped his writing. Also included in the appendices is a bibliography of Mundy's work.

== Reception ==
Critical reception has been positive. The Journal of Popular Culture gave an overall favorable review for Talbot Mundy, Philosopher of Adventure, writing "I would assume the book's audience to be somewhat limited but justifiably enthusiastic: relevant academics and their libraries; fans of genre or series fiction; those interested in theosophy or Eastern literature; and bibliophiles." Extrapolation also reviewed the work, stating that they thought "the strongest part of the biography when Taves is best, perhaps a result of his work as a media archivist, is the section that treats the Jack Armstrong radio scripts and the last of the "multiple lives" led by Mundy in the years just before Pearl Harbor."
