= Shikari in Galveston =

2003 alternate history novella by S. M. Stirling

- Short story by S. M. Stirling
- Country: United States
- Language: English
- Genres: alternate history, steampunk, post-apocalyptic fiction

Publication
- Published in: Worlds That Weren't
- Publication type: Anthology
- Publisher: Roc Books
- Media type: Print (Hardcover and Paperback)
- Publication date: 2003

Chronology
—	The Peshawar Lancers

Shikari in Galveston is an alternate history novella written by S. M. Stirling. It is a prequel to The Peshawar Lancers.

== Plot summary ==
Shikari in Galveston takes place in Texas a century after a meteor shower devastated North America and Europe in 1878. The disaster led to the United States collapsing and later causing society in Texas to evolve into a mixture of Native American and European society. The British Empire, or the Angrezi Raj, has been expanding its influence into coastal North America, including Galveston, which is being used as a base.

British cavalry officer Eric King, is assembling a hunting party which includes the revenge seeking Sonjuh, who lost her family to the cannibals and Robre, a young hunter of the Cross Plains tribe who hopes to earn a rare rifle from King. Meanwhile, Russian agents plan to incite a tribe of cannibals to destroy the British allied tribes of former Texas.

== Literary significance and reception ==
Rick Kleffel called the story "fascinating and thought-provoking" and described an action scene as a "reader's equivalent of a wild thrill sequence from great popcorn movie", but complained about the language making the story difficult to read. Strange Horizons said the story "succeeds in delivering action-packed adventure and hair's-breadth escapes" but stated the story ended too soon and read more like a compact version of a novel. Steven H Silver said that the story reads like H. Rider Haggard set in an unexplored African continent, but complained that Stirling focuses on the world and the technology rather than the characters.

== Publication ==
Shikari in Galveston was originally published in 2003 in the alternate history anthology Worlds That Weren't which included stories by Harry Turtledove, Mary Gentle, and Walter John Williams. The story was accompanied by an afterword by Stirling entitled Why Then, There, in which he states he uses alternate history to write adventure fiction in the tradition of Edgar Rice Burroughs and H. Rider Haggard without resorting to colonialist stereotypes.
