= Hira Singh (novel) =

Hira Singh (or Hira Singh : When India Came to Fight in Flanders) is a short novel by Talbot Mundy, originally published (under the title Hira Singh's Tale) as a four-part serial in Adventure Magazine in October and November 1917, and published in book form in 1918 by Cassell (London) and Bobbs-Merrill (Indianapolis). The hero of the story is a Sikh officer, Ranjoor Singh, an earlier adventure of whom is recounted in the novel The Winds of the World.

== Plot introduction ==
Hira Singh is the story of a regiment of Sikh cavalry who are captured in battle in Flanders in the early days of World War I, escape from captivity and experience many adventures as they make their way back to India.

== Major themes ==
The underlying theme of the story is the nature of leadership, as Ranjoor Singh struggles to control his semi-rebellious force under conditions of great difficulty.
