= Tros of Samothrace =

1934 fantasy historical novel by Talbot Mundy

- Picture of dust-cover from the first edition.
- Author: Talbot Mundy
- Language: English
- Series: Tros
- Genre: Fantasy
- Publisher: Appleton-Century
- Publication date: 1934
- Publication place: United States
- Media type: Print (Hardback)
- Pages: 949
- OCLC: 592466
- Followed by: Queen Cleopatra

Tros of Samothrace is a fantasy historical novel by American writer Talbot Mundy. The story was composed of several novellas which were published originally in the American magazine Adventure during 1925 and 1926. It was published first together as a book during 1934 by Appleton-Century company.

Mundy dedicated Tros of Samothrace to his friend Rose Wilder Lane, who had funded its book publication.

== Plot introduction ==
The novel concerns the courageous adventures of the title character (a Greek from Samothrace) as he helps pre-Roman Britons fight the invading forces of Julius Caesar. Over the course of the novel, Tros travels from Britain to Spain, and finally the city of Rome itself.

The novel contains minor fantasy elements. One of the characters, Fflur, has the power of "second sight". The novel also imagines a benevolent secret society of mystics which includes the British Druids and the followers of the Greek Samothracian Mysteries.

== Publishing history ==
Picture of dust-cover by Lionel Dillon from the Gnome Press reprint.

The original sequence of novellas was published as follows:

1. "Tros of Samothrace", 10 February 1925 (later became chapters 1..14 of the novel)
2. "The Enemy of Rome", 10 April 1925 (chapters 15..26)
3. "Prisoners of War", 10 June 1925 (chapters 27..37)
4. "Hostages to Luck", 20 August 1925 (chapters 38..51)
5. "Admiral of Caesar's Fleet", 10 October 1925 (chapters 52..66)
6. "The Dancing Girl of Gades", 10 December 1925 (chapters 67..81)
7. "Messenger of Destiny", part 1, 10 February 1926 (chapters 82..87)
8. "Messenger of Destiny", part 2, 20 February 1926 (chapters 88..92)
9. "Messenger of Destiny", part 3, 28 February 1926 (chapters 93..96)

When Tros of Samothrace was published as four paperback volumes during 1967 and 1971, the divisions between volumes coincided with Mundy's own divisions:

- Tros contains "Tros of Samothrace" and "The Enemy of Rome".
- Helma contains "Prisoners of War" and "Hostages to Luck".
- Liafail contains "Admiral of Caesar's Fleet" and "The Dancing Girl of Gades".
- Helene contains all three parts of "Messenger of Destiny".

When Tros of Samothrace was reissued as three paperback volumes during 1976, the divisions between volumes was partway through "Prisoners of War" and "Admiral of Caesar's Fleet".

== Reception ==
Although the stories were popular with Adventure's readers, they also aroused debate due to the fact that Mundy described Julius Caesar and Roman civilization as imperialistic and tyrannical; Adventure editor Arthur Sullivant Hoffman later stated that the Tros stories were the most controversial the magazine had ever published. Mundy's negative depiction of Caesar resulted in controversy in Adventure's letters section, "the Camp-Fire". The debate on Tros of Samothrace's depiction of Caesar in the magazine featured contributions by writers such as Elmer Davis, Arthur Gilchrist Brodeur, Hugh Pendexter and Arthur D. Howden Smith.

Fritz Leiber praised Tros of Samothrace, saying: "The Tros stories made a great impression on me as a young man. I read and re-read them...it was wonderful, imaginative writing". Leiber also said that "Talbot Mundy’s Tros of Samothrace is one of the half-dozen novels I have re-read most often in the course of my life, or rather during the thirty-eight years since I first devoured it. Such books inevitably become part of our lives, closely interwoven with all of our thoughts and actions..." Floyd C. Gale wrote during 1959 when reviewing a new edition of the book that it was "Out of print far too long, here is one classic that still reads as if written yesterday ... An absolute Must Buy at this price".
