= Talbot Mundy =

British writer, born William Lancaster Gribbon (1879–1940)

- Mundy, c. 1917
- Born: William Lancaster Gribbon; 23 April 1879; Hammersmith, London, United Kingdom
- Died: 5 August 1940 (aged 61); Anna Maria Island, Manatee County, Florida, United States
- Citizenship: British (1879–1917); American (1917–1940)
- Occupations: Short story writer, novelist
- Spouse(s): Kathleen Steele (m.1903–08); Inez Craven (m.1908–12); Harriette Rosemary Strafer (m.1913–24); Sally Ames (1924–31); Theda "Dawn" Webber (1931–40)
- Writing career
- Pen name: Walter Galt
- Genre: Adventure-fiction

Talbot Mundy (born William Lancaster Gribbon, 23 April 1879 – 5 August 1940) was an English writer of adventure fiction. Based for most of his life in the United States, he also wrote under the pseudonym of Walter Galt. Best known as the author of King of the Khyber Rifles and the Jimgrim series, much of his work was published in pulp magazines.

Mundy was born to a conservative middle-class family in Hammersmith, London. Educated at Rugby School, he left with no qualifications and moved to British India, where he worked in administration and then journalism. He relocated to East Africa, where he worked as an ivory poacher and then as the town clerk of Kisumu. In 1909 he moved to New York City where he lived in poverty. A friend encouraged him to start writing about his life experiences, and he sold his first short story to Frank Munsey's magazine, The Scrap Book, in 1911. He soon began selling short stories and non-fiction articles to a variety of pulp magazines, such as Argosy, Cavalier, and Adventure. In 1914 Mundy published his first novel, Rung Ho!, soon followed by The Winds of the World and King of the Khyber Rifles, all of which were set in British India and drew upon his own experiences. Critically acclaimed, they were published in both the U.S. and U.K.

Becoming a U.S. citizen, in 1918 he joined the Christian Science new religious movement, and with them moved to Jerusalem to establish the city's first English-language newspaper. Returning to the U.S. in 1920, he began writing the Jimgrim series and saw the first film adaptations of his stories. Spending time at the Theosophical community of Lomaland in San Diego, California, he became a friend of Katherine Tingley and embraced Theosophy. Many of his novels produced in the coming years, most notably Om: The Secret of Ahbor Valley and The Devil's Guard, reflected his Theosophical beliefs. He also involved himself in various failed business ventures, including an oil drilling operation in Tijuana, Mexico. During the Great Depression he supplemented his literary income by writing scripts for the radio series Jack Armstrong, the All-American Boy. He suffered from diabetes, eventually dying of complications.

During Mundy's career his work was often compared with that of his more commercially successful contemporaries, H. Rider Haggard and Rudyard Kipling. Like them he expressed a positive interest in Asian religion and philosophy, although unlike them he adopted an anti-colonialist stance. His work has been cited as an influence on a variety of later science-fiction and fantasy writers, and he has been the subject of two biographies.

== Early life ==
=== Childhood: 1879–1899 ===
Mundy was born as William Lancaster Gribbon on 23 April 1879 at his parental home of 59 Milson Road, Hammersmith in West London. The following month he was baptised into the Anglican Church at the local St. Matthew's Church. His father, Walter Galt Gribbon (1845–95), had been born in Leeds, Yorkshire as the son of a porcelain and glass merchant. Gribbon had studied at Oxford University's St. John's College and then trained as a barrister before relocating to Swansea, where he first worked as a school teacher and then an accountant. After his first wife's death, he married Mundy's mother, Margaret Lancaster, in Nantyglo in July 1878. A member of an English family based in Wales, she was the sister of the politician John Lancaster. After a honeymoon in Ilfracombe, Devon, the newly married couple moved to Hammersmith, where Mundy was their first child. They would have three further children: Walter Harold (b. 1881), Agnes Margaret (b. 1882), and Florence Mary (c. 1883), although the latter died in infancy. In 1883 the family moved to nearby Norbiton, although within a few years had moved out of London to Kingston Hill, Surrey.

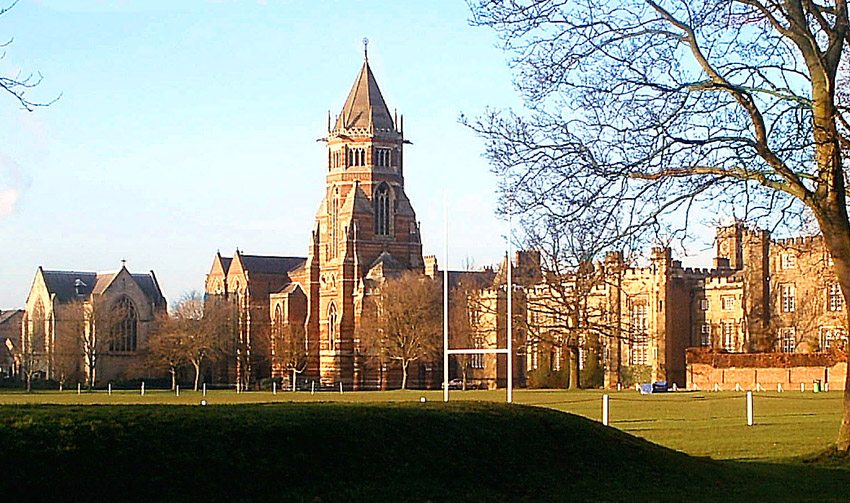
Mundy was educated at Rugby School, pictured

Mundy was raised into a conservative middle-class Victorian milieu. His father owned a successful accountancy business and was director of the Woking Water and Gas Company, as well as being an active member of the Conservative Party and Primrose League. He was also a devout Anglican, serving as warden at St. Luke's Church. The family went on summer holidays to southern coastal towns such as Hythe, Sandgate, and Charmouth, with Mundy also spending time visiting relatives in Bardney, Lincolnshire. He attended Grove House, a preparatory school in Guildford, Surrey, before receiving a scholarship to attend Rugby School, where he arrived in September 1893.

In 1895 his father died of a brain hemorrhage, and Mundy henceforth became increasingly rebellious. He left Rugby School without any qualifications in December 1895; in later years he recalled bad memories of the institution, comparing it to "prisons run by sadists". With Mundy unable to go to university, his mother hoped that he might enter the Anglican clergy. He worked briefly for a newspaper in London, although the firm closed shortly after. He left England and moved to Quedlinburg in northern Germany with his pet fox terrier. He didn't speak German but secured work as an assistant driver towing vans for a circus; after a colleague drunkenly killed his dog he left the job. Back in England, he worked in farming and estate management for his uncle in Lincolnshire, describing this lifestyle as "'High Farming,' high church and old port and all that went with that life – pheasant shooting, fox-hunting and so on."

=== India and East Africa: 1899–1909 ===
Talbot's accounts of the following years are unreliable, tainted by his own fictionalised claims about his activities. In March 1899 he sailed aboard the Caledonia to Bombay in British India, where he had secured an administrative job in a famine relief program based in the native state of Baroda. There he purchased a horse and became a fan of pig-sticking, a form of boar hunting. After suffering a bout of malaria he returned to Britain in April 1900. In later years he claimed that during this period he had fought for the British Army in the Second Boer War, although this was untrue, for chronologically it conflicted with his documented activities in Britain; he did however have relatives who fought in the conflict. Another of his later claims was that while visiting Brighton in summer 1900 he ran into his favourite writer, Rudyard Kipling, while walking in the street, and that they had a conversation about India.

Securing a job as a reporter for the Daily Mail, in March 1901 he returned to India aboard the Caledonia. His assignment was to report on the Mahsud uprising against the British administration led by Mulla Pawindah. On this assignment, he accompanied British troops although only reached as far as Peshawar, not entering the Khyber Pass which he would use as a setting for later stories. While in Rajputana he had his first experience with an Indian guru, and after his assignment he went tiger hunting. In Bombay in 1901 he met Englishwoman Kathleen Steele, and they had returned to Britain by late 1902, where he gained work for the Walton and Company merchant firm in Holborn. The couple married in Westminster in January 1903. By this point he had amassed large debts, and with his wife fled to Cape Town, South Africa to evade his creditors; in his absence he was declared bankrupt. He wife returned to London, and they never saw each other again. From there, he claimed to have boarded a merchant sailing vessel to Australia, where he spent time in Sydney and Brisbane before sailing back to Africa and disembarking in Laurenço Marques, Portuguese East Africa.

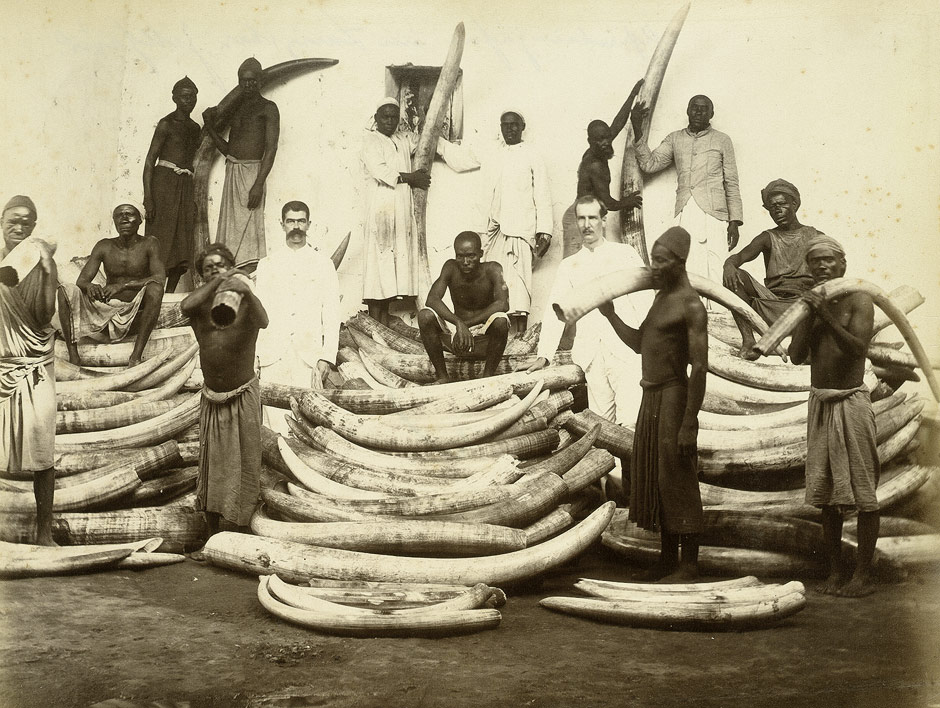
Mundy was active in the East African ivory trade

In February 1904 he arrived in Mombasa, British East Africa, later claiming that he initially worked as a hunter. He also claimed that while near Shirati, he was shot in the leg with a poison spear by a Masai who was stealing his cattle. He travelled to Muanza in German East Africa, where he was afflicted with blackwater fever. Mundy then worked as an elephant hunter, collecting and selling ivory. His later novel, The Ivory Trail, was inspired largely by his own experiences at this time. In later years he alleged that he met Frederick Selous at this juncture, although Mundy's biographer has pointed out that Selous was not in East Africa at this time.

Mundy secured employment as the town clerk of Kisumu, a frontier town where he was stationed during a number of indigenous tribal insurgencies against British imperial rule; the Kisii rebelled in the winter of 1904–05, followed by the Sotik and the Nandi in summer 1905. On each occasion the rebels were defeated by the British Army. Christian missionaries pressured Mundy into overseeing a program of providing clothes for the native population, who often went naked; he thought this unnecessary, although designed a goat-skin apron for them to wear. He made the acquaintance of a magico-religious specialist, Oketch, of the Kakamega Kavirondo tribe, who healed him after a hunting accident. He had sexual relationships with a variety of indigenous women, and was dismissed from his job as a result. He informed his wife of these activities, thus suggesting that she sue him for divorce; the divorce was granted in May 1908.

Unemployed, he moved to Nairobi, where he met a married woman, Inez Craven (née Broom). Together they eloped, and she divorced her husband in November 1908. The couple moved to an island on Lake Victoria, where they lived from February to June, although were subsequently arrested under the Distressed British Subjects Act; under this, they faced imprisoned for six months in Mombasa before deportation to Bombay, although this eventuality did not occur. In November, the couple married at Mombasa Registry Office; here, he first used the name of "Talbot Mundy", erroneously claiming to the son of Charles Chetwynd-Talbot, 20th Earl of Shrewsbury. That month, they left Mombasa aboard the SS Natal, stopping in Djibouti and Port Said on their way to Marseille, from where they made their way to England. There they visited Mundy's mother in Lee-on-Solent, Hampshire, and she agreed to give Mundy a substantial sum of money; it would be the last time Mundy saw her. Mundy and his wife spent most of the money while staying in London, before leaving from Southampton aboard the SS Teutonic in September 1909, headed for the United States.

=== United States and early literary career: 1909–1915 ===
"Why did I start writing? The price of pork and beans made it necessary. I just got hungry enough, which is always a good thing for beginners. I was in New York and I knew Jeff Hanley, a red haired reporter on a paper there. I would pound out stuff on the typewriter and Jeff would come home, look my stuff over, say it was rotten, which it was, and make me go ahead doing more of it. Finally, under the stint of his irony I wrote a story and sold it to Frank Munsey."

— Talbot Mundy.

Arriving in New York City, the couple moved into a hotel room in the Gashouse District. Soon after arrival, Mundy was mugged and suffered a fractured skull, being hospitalised in Bellevue Hospital. Doctors feared that he might not survive the injury, while the perpetrator, Joseph Cavill, was indicted with first degree robbery and sentenced to six months imprisonment. Throughout 1910, Mundy worked in a series of menial jobs, being fired from several of them. His hospitalisation and poverty put great strain on his marriage, as did legal charges filed by the United States Department of Commerce and Labor accusing the couple of entering the country using false information; the charges were soon dismissed.

In 1910, he ran into Jeff Hanley, a reporter who had covered his mugging incident; Hanley was impressed by Mundy's tales of India and Africa, and lent him a typewriter, suggesting that he write some of his stories down for potential publication. Mundy did so, and published his first short story, "A Transaction in Diamonds", in the February 1911 issue of Frank Munsey's magazine, The Scrap Book. His second publication was a non-fiction article, "Pig-sticking in India", which appeared in the April issue of a new pulp magazine, Adventure, which specialised in adventure fiction. Although he and Adventure's editor Arthur Sullivant Hoffman did not initially like each other, In the May 1911 issue of Adventure his short story 'The Phantom Battery' appeared. Mundy continued writing for the magazine, as well as for The Scrap Book, Argosy, and Cavalier. In 1912, Mundy published sixteen short stories and four articles in Adventure, seven of which were under the name "Walter Galt". Biographer Brian Taves suggested that these early short stories are notable "not so much for themselves as for how much they diverged from his later oeuvre", for instance dealing with subjects like boxing that are absent from his later work. In 1912, Adventure had also established The Adventurer's Club, of which Mundy became a chartered member.

The February 1912 issue of Adventure, where Mundy's "The Soul of a Regiment" first appeared. According to Taves, it was Mundy's first magazine story "to mark him as a writer to watch and to merit a cover illustration."

Mundy's story "The Soul of a Regiment" attracted particular praise and critical attention. Revolving around an Egyptian regiment who are taught to play music by their English Sergeant-Instructor in the buildup to the Somaliland Campaign, it was initially published by Adventure in February 1912, before becoming the first of Mundy's publications to be republished in Britain, appearing in the March 1912 issue of George Newnes' The Grand Magazine. Soon he would see his short stories published in a range of British publications, including The Strand Magazine, London Magazine, and Cassell's Magazine of Fiction as well as The Grand. 1912 also saw two cinematic adaptations of his short stories, For Valour and The Fire Cop – produced by the Edison Company and Selig Polyscope Company respectively – with both being fairly faithful to his original stories.

In June 1912, Inez sued for divorce on the grounds of Mundy's adultery; he did not challenge the accusation and the divorce was confirmed in October. As part of the divorce settlement, Mundy was forced to pay $20 a week alimony to Inez for the rest of her life. Mundy moved into an apartment in Greenwich Village, which for a short time he shared with Hoffman's assistant Sinclair Lewis. At this point he met the Kentucky-born portrait painter Harriette Rosemary Strafer, and after she agreed to marry him they wed in Stamford, Connecticut in August 1913. Strafer had been a practitioner of a Christian new religious movement, Christian Science, since 1904, and encouraged her new husband to take an interest in the faith; studying the writings of its founder, Mary Baker Eddy, he converted to it in 1914. The couple then moved to the town of Norway in Maine, where Mundy's friend Hugh Pendexter was already resident. He involved himself in the activities of his new home, becoming chairman of the local agricultural committee and joining the Norway Committee on Public Safety. Following the outbreak of World War I, in which Britain went to war against Germany, Mundy sought to attain U.S. citizenship; applying in November 1914, his request was approved in March 1917.

In Norway, Mundy authored his first novel, For the Peace of India, which was set during the Indian Rebellion of 1857. It was serialised in Adventure under the altered title of Rung Ho! before being published by Charles Scribner in the U.S., and Cassells in the U.K. Critically well received, the book sold well. In August 1914, Adventure published "The Sword of Iskander", the first of Mundy's eight novelettes revolving around the character of Dick Anthony of Arran, a Scotsman battling the Russians in Iran, which ran until March 1915. It was in his January 1914 short story "A Soldier and a Gentleman" that he introduced the character of Yasmini, a young Hindu woman who would reappear in many of his later stories. He then began work on a second novel, The Winds of the World, which told the story of a Sikh officer, Risaldar-Major Ranjoor Singh, who sets out to expose a German spy who is attempting to foment an uprising in British India; during the course of the story he introduced Yasmini as a character. Serialised in Adventure from July to September 1915, it was then published in Britain by Cassell; when Scribner declined to publish it, Mundy acquired a literary agent, Paul Reynolds. Upon publication, it received good reviews.

=== King of the Khyber Rifles: 1916–1918 ===
"I remember sitting in the dark and seeing the throat of the Khyber Pass at sunset - gloomy, ominous, mysterious, lonely, haunted by the ghosts of murdered men and by the prowling outlaws who live by the rifle and shun the daylight. As if the word were almost spoken in my ear I heard "Death roosts in the Khyber while he preens his wings." It seemed like a good line, so I made a note of it."

— Talbot Mundy, on how he started King of the Khyber Rifles.

Mundy authored comparatively few short stories in 1916 as he focused on his third novel, King of the Khyber Rifles, which told the story of Captain Athelstan King of the British India Secret Service and his attempt to prevent a German-backed jihad break out against the British administration in the North-West Frontier. Again, it featured Yasmini as a core character. The novel was serialised in Everybody's from May 1916 to January 1917, accompanied by illustrations by Joseph Clement Coll, a man whom Mundy praised, declaring that "there never was a better illustrator in the history of the world!". The novel was then published by U.S.-based Bobbs-Merrill in November 1916 and by U.K.-based Constable in January 1917; it received critical acclaim, with critics comparing it to the work of Kipling and H. Rider Haggard.

In 1917 only two of Mundy's short stories appeared in Adventure; the first was a reprint of "The Soul of a Regiment", while the second was a sequel, "The Damned Old Nigger"; in a 1918 readership survey, these were rated as the first and third most popular stories in Adventure, respectively. From October to December 1917 he serialised his fourth novel, Hira Singh's Tale, in Adventure, which was partly based upon real events. The story revolves around a regiment of Sikhs fighting on the Western Front for the British Empire who are then captured by the Germans; transferred to a Turkish prisoner of war camp, they attempt to escape and return overland to India. Casells published a British edition in June 1918, although for American publication in book form it was renamed Hira Singh. Talbot devoted the latter to his friend Elmer Davis, and gifted a copy to the British monarch George V, who was Commander-in-Chief of the 14th Ferozepore Sikhs. The book received largely positive reviews in the U.S., although was criticised in the Times Literary Supplement. Mundy felt that many reviewers had failed to understand the main reason for the book; he had meant it to represent a tribute to the Indian soldiers who had died fighting in Europe during World War I.

In autumn 1918, Mundy and his wife moved to Fifth Avenue in New York City. That year he serialised On the Trail of Tippoo Tib, part of a series of novelettes which he termed "The Up and Down the Earth Tales". Set in British East Africa prior to the First World War, it dealt with an expedition of three Englishmen and an American who search for a hidden cache of ivory. When published in book form in June, Bobbs-Merrill renamed the story The Ivory Trail. The Ivory Trail was Mundy's most widely reviewed work, receiving a largely positive reception, and resulting in him being interviewed for the New York Evening World.

== Later life ==
=== Christian Science and Palestine: 1918–1920 ===
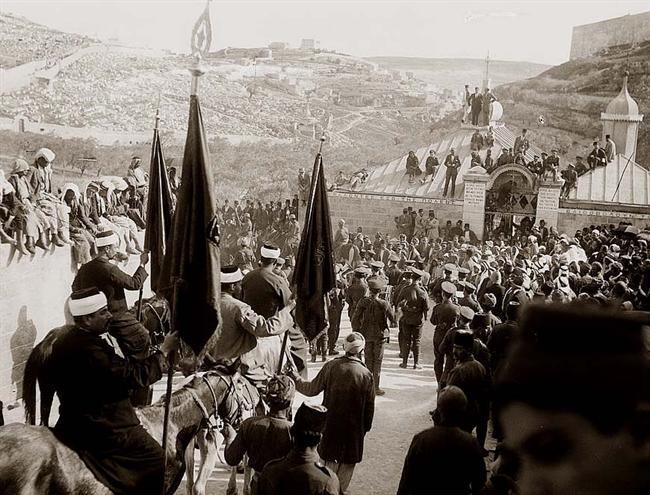
Talbot was present in Palestine during the Nebi Musa riots, 1920 (photograph of the day pictured)

In December 1918, Mundy and his wife had visited Indianapolis, there meeting with the team at Bobbs-Merrill, and it was here that he encountered Christian Science, a new religious movement founded by Mary Baker Eddy in the 19th century. He was convinced to advertise his books in the group's newspaper, the Christian Science Monitor. Becoming increasingly interested in the movement, he became close friends with William Denison McCrackan, who was the associated editor of both the Christian Science Journal and Christian Science Sentinel. Mundy agreed to become the president of The Anglo-American Society, a Christian Science group devoted to providing aid for Palestine, which had recently been conquered by the British from the Ottoman Empire. He also became vice president of the Society's magazine, New Earth News.

Spending time at the Christian Science White Mountains Camp in Tamworth, New Hampshire, it was there that he wrote The Eye of Zeitun; it included the four protagonists who had appeared in The Ivory Trail experiencing a new adventure in Armenia, and reflected Turkish persecution of the Armenian people. It was serialised in Romance from February to March 1920 before being published by Bobbs-Merrill in March under the altered title of The Eyes of Zeitoon. The book received mixed reviews and did not sell well. Although pleased with the work of his agent Paul Reynolds, he switched to Howard Wheeler, with whom he felt more comfortable.

In December 1919, Talbot decided to travel to Palestine, to aid the Society in establishing the Jerusalem News, the first-English language newspaper in the city. Departing the U.S. in January 1920 aboard the RMS Adriatic, he arrived in Southampton, before travelling to London, Rome, Alexandria, and then reaching Jerusalem in February. There he became the newspaper's editorial assistant, being involved in writing articles, reporting on current events, proof reading, and editing. In Jerusalem, he entered a relationship with Sally Ames, a fellow Christian Scientist whom he had first met in the U.S. It was also in the city that he later claimed he had met the English writer G. K. Chesterton on the latter's visit. Talbot witnessed the conflict between Arab and Jewish populations within the city, and was present during the Nebi Musa riots. With Ames he also visited Egypt, there traveling to the Great Pyramid of Giza and later alleging that he spent a night alone in its King's Chamber. Having identified itself as a wartime paper, the Jerusalem News ceased publication after the transition from British military rule to the British civilian rule of Mandatory Palestine.

=== Creating Jimgrim: 1920–1922 ===
Mundy returned to New York City in August, there informing Rosemary that he wanted a divorce, which she refused. Unable to live with her, he moved into an apartment in Huguenot Park, Staten Island. There he authored Guns of the Gods, a story set in Yasmini's youth; it was serialised in Adventure from March to May, and published in book form by Bobbs-Merrill in June. The Times Literary Supplement accused it of having a strong anti-English bias.

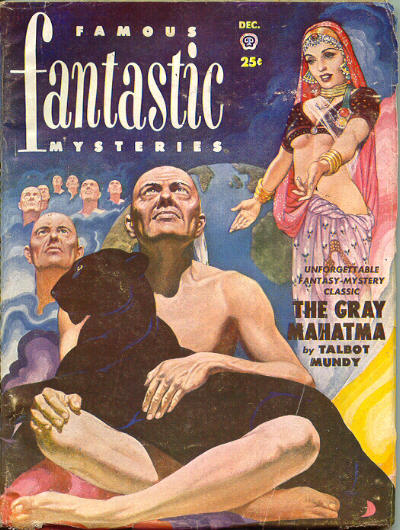
Mundy's The Gray Mahatma, also published as Caves of Terror, was reprinted in the December 1951 issue of Famous Fantastic Mysteries

It was also on Staten Island that he began drawing upon his experiences of Palestine for a series of novelettes set in the region that featured a new protagonist, James Schuyler Grim, or "Jimgrim". As created by Mundy, Jimgrim was an American who had been recruited by the British intelligence services because of his in-depth knowledge of Arab life. Mundy claimed that Jimgrim was based on a real individual, whose identity he refused to reveal, while later biographer Brian Taves has suggested that the character was heavily influenced by T. E. Lawrence. The first of these Jimgrim stories, "The Adventure of El-Kerak", appeared in Adventure in November 1921; the second, "Under the Dome of the Rock", appeared in December, while the third, "The 'Iblis' at Ludd", appeared in January 1922. In August 1922, Mundy published "A Secret Society", in which he took Jimgrim out of Palestine and sent him to Egypt. This series of novelettes promoted the cause of Arab independence from British imperialism and presented an idealised image of the prominent Arab leader Faisal I of Iraq. These early Jimgrim stories were an immediate success for Adventure, however Bobbs-Merrill were nevertheless not keen on them and urged Mundy to write something else. The company had repeatedly lent money to Mundy, who was now heavily in debt to them.

In October 1921, Mundy left New York and settled in Reno, Nevada, where Ames joined him. He initiated divorce proceedings against Rosemary in a Reno court. The case was eventually heard in August 1923, with Mundy alleging that he wanted a divorce because Rosemary had deserted him. She denied the allegations, and the judge dismissed Talbot's case, adding that from the evidence Rosemary herself would be entitled to sue for divorce, which she nevertheless refused to do. Mundy meanwhile continued writing prolifically, producing 19 novel-length stories from 1921 through to the end of 1923, something that he found particularly tiring.

In November 1922, Adventure published Mundy's The Gray Mahatma, which would later be republished under the title of Caves of Terror. Taves described Caves of Terror as "a landmark in Mundy's career", being "one of [his] most unusual and extraordinary novels". The work included characters such as King and Yasmini who had been a part of Mundy's early oeuvre, as well as more recently developed characters like Jeff Ramsden from his Jimgrim series. It revealed Mundy's growing interest in Asian religion and also introduced a number of fantasy elements not present in his earlier work. The readers of Adventure voted it as their favourite novel of the year. At this time, he also exhibited his growing interest in esoteric ideas through the letters he published in Adventure, in which he discussed his ideas about the Egyptian pyramids, the Lost Tribes of Israel, and the Ark of the Covenant.

In 1922, Mundy and Ames moved to Truckee in California, although in October he travelled to San Diego, remaining there for several months. He had continued writing, producing The Nine Unknown, a Jimgrim novel which again exhibited Mundy's interest in Indian religious ideas. Serialised in Adventure from March to April 1923, it was published by Bobbs-Merrill in March 1924 and then in Britain by Hutchinson in June. Taves however considered it to be "the most shallow and least satisfying of Mundy's fantasies". Mundy wanted to see the publication of popular editions of his novels, viewing this as a potential source of additional income and a good means of encouraging cinematic adaptations; in 1922 Bobbs-Merrill agreed, resulting in A. L. Burt Company publishing eight Mundy novels in two years. In the United Kingdom, Hutchinson published all but one of Mundy's then-written novels between 1922 and 1925.

=== Embracing Theosophy: 1922–1927 ===
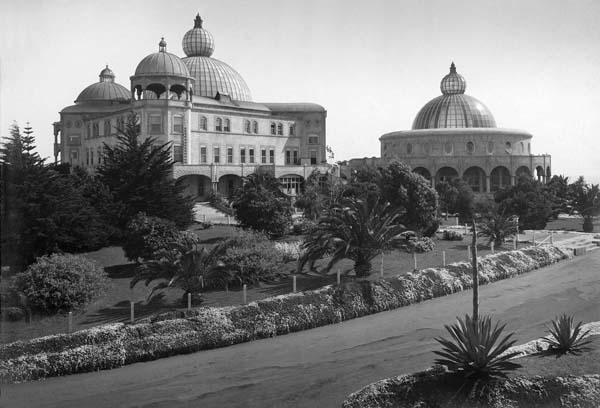
Lomaland's Raja Yoga Academy and the Temple of Peace, c. 1915

In 1922, Mundy resigned from the Mother Church of Christian Science. He was increasingly interested in Theosophy, and on 1 January 1923 he joined the Theosophical Society Pasadena, with Ames joining later that month. He expressed the view that reading the works of Theosophy's co-founder Helena Blavatsky "stirred in me something deeper and more challenging than I had known was there and capable of being stirred." He developed a close friendship with the groups' leader Katherine Tingley, who invited him to live in her two-storey home, Wachere Crest, at the Theosophical community of Lomaland in San Diego. At Lomaland, he immersed himself in the study of Theosophy, attending lectures and plays on the subject, and eventually appearing in some of these plays and giving his own lectures, coming to be recognised as one of the Society's most popular and charismatic public speakers.

In 1923, Mundy became part of Tingley's cabinet, a position normally reserved for Theosophical veterans; he remained an active member of the cabinet until after Tingley's death in 1929. Tingley invited him to contribute to The Theosophical Path, with his first article in this magazine, devoted to his time in Jerusalem, appearing in the February 1923 issue. He would be a regular contributor to the magazine through 1924 and 1925, and would continue to do so with less frequency until 1929. He also wrote a preface for Tingley's 1925 book The Wine of Life. In June 1924, Mundy and Sally relocated to Mérida, Yucatan in Mexico for six weeks. Under Mexican law, this residence allowed Mundy to secure a divorce from his third wife, which he did in July, marrying Ames the following day. Returning to San Diego, Mundy and Ames purchased a house near to Lomaland for $25,000 in late 1924. The house — which required much renovation — was named "Tilgaun" by the couple, who lived there with her son Dick.

At the recommendation of director Fred Niblo, whom Mundy had known in Africa, in early 1923 the producer Thomas H. Ince hired Mundy as a screenwriter. Mundy's first assignment for Ince was to write a novelization of the upcoming film, Her Reputation; the book was published by Bobbs-Merrill, and in England by Hutchinson under the title The Bubble Reputation. Mundy later expressed disdain for the novel, with his biographer Peter Berresford Ellis describing it as "the worst book that Talbot ever wrote". For Ince, Mundy also produced a novelisation of a Western film, When Trails Were New, which dealt with the interactions between Native Americans and European settlers in the Wisconsin woodlands of 1832. He later criticised the novel, with Taves describing it as "unquestionably one of Mundy's worst stories". Mundy continued to write his own stories; in December 1922, Adventure published Mundy's Benefit of Doubt, which was followed by a sequel, Treason, in January 1923. These stories involved the character of Athelstan King, and were set in the context of the Malabar rebellion which had taken place in Malabar in 1921. In December 1923, Adventure published Mundy's next Jimgrim story, Mohammed's Tooth, which would later be republished as The Hundred Days.

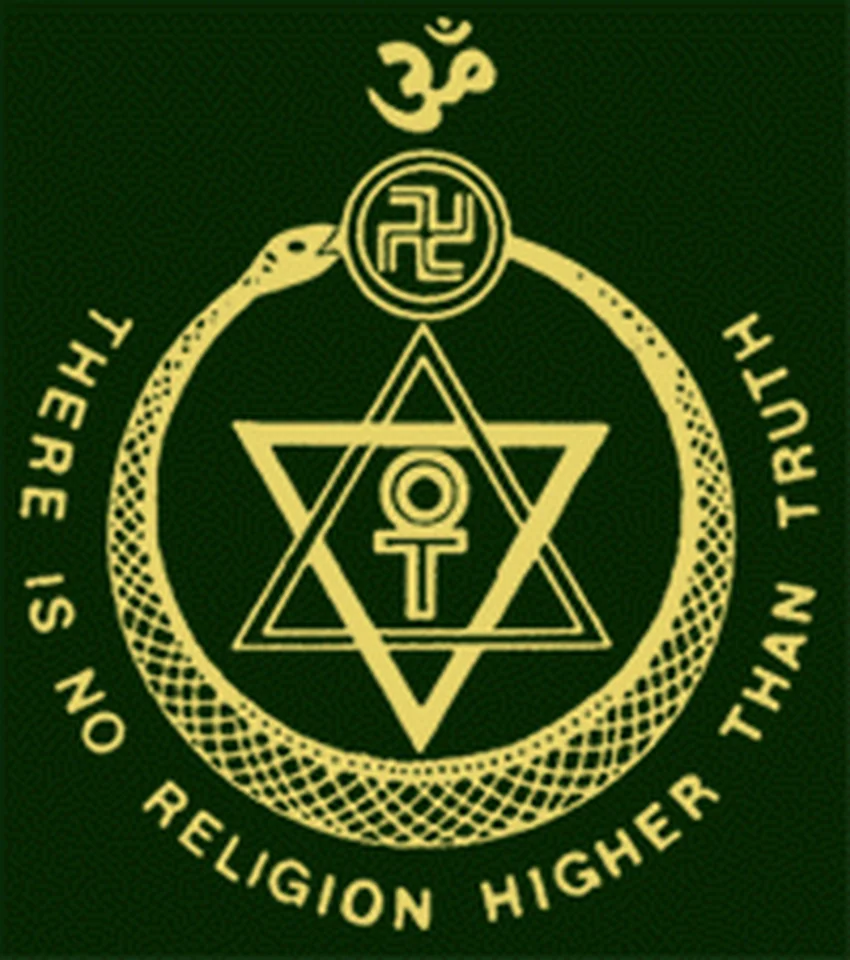
Mundy's embrace of the doctrines of the Theosophical Society (logo pictured) heavily influenced his trilogy of Om, Ramsden and The Red Flame of Erinpura

Mundy followed this with Om: The Secret of Ahbor Valley, which was serialised in Adventure from October to November 1924, before publication by Bobbs-Merrill. The characters were based upon individuals that he knew at Lomaland, and the story expounded Theosophical ideas regarding the Masters and the existence of a universal "Ancient Wisdom". Adventure included a disclaimer at the start of the story stating that they did not endorse the esoteric movement. In the same issue of Adventure, Mundy wrote a short essay discussing the novel's subject matter. The essay described Indian drama, and the religious concept of the "Mahatma". Mundy also wrote that the novel's protagonist was based on British civil servants in India who had "come to realise that the whole theory of Empire is wrong." Ellis described the work as Mundy's "most significant novel", and his "literary masterpiece", while for Taves, it was "his most distinctly literary book, surpassing earlier novels by exhibiting a maturing skill in choice of language, plot structure, theme, depth of character." Mundy received hundreds of letters praising the work, and it also received good critical reviews from press. It proved popular among Theosophists, with Tingley asking Mundy if he would adapt it for one of her theaters. The British edition underwent six reprints in quick succession, while Swedish and German translations were soon commissioned for publication. At the prompting of several letters, Mundy began work on a sequel, Ramsden, which appeared in Adventure in June 1926 before being published by Bobbs-Merrill under the title of The Devils Guard. Upon publication it received good reviews. A third instalment in the trilogy, The Red Flame of Erinpura, appeared in Adventure in 1927. Taves later noted that these three works reflected Theosophy's "most direct influence upon Mundy's writing", adding that in looking to Asia not only "for exoticism, but for wisdom and an alternative mode of living superior to Western habits", they "reinvigorated and revitalized fantasy-adventure literature".

Mundy then moved towards historical fiction. His next main project was the "Tros Saga", a series of six novel-length stories which appeared in Adventure over the course of 1925. Set in Europe during the first century BCE, the eponymous Tros was a Samothracian pirate who combats the Roman military leader Julius Caesar, who in Mundy's novels had been responsible for the death of Tros' father. The series further reflected Mundy's Theosophical beliefs by presenting both the Samothracians and the druids as practitioners of the "Ancient Wisdom" religion that Theosophy propounded. Mundy's negative portrayal of Caesar caused controversy, with various letters being published in Adventure's opinion section debating the accuracy of Mundy's portrayal, which included contributions from historical specialists in the period. The collected book, reaching 950 pages in length, was published in 1934 by Appleton-Century and Hutchinson, at which it proved both a critical and a commercial success. Mundy remained with the Roman Empire for a novel focusing on the final months of the Emperor Commodus; it was serialised as The Falling Star by Adventure in October 1926 and later published in book form by Hutchinson as Caesar Dies in 1934. From 1925 to 1927 he also wrote Queen Cleopatra, a lengthy novel that both Bobbs-Merrill and Hutchinson wanted edited down before they would publish it. Moving away from the Roman Empire, Mundy wrote W.H.: A Portion of the Record of Sir William Halifax, a novel set in Tudor England which featured William Shakespeare as a supporting character. Mundy had difficulty finding a publisher for W.H., although it was eventually serialised as Ho for London Town! in Argosy All-Story Weekly in February 1929, followed by book publication as W.H. through Hutchinson in 1831.

Turning his attention to new business ventures, he joined a syndicate, the Sindicato de Desarrollo Liafail, who were planning on drilling for oil in Tijuana, Mexico. Mundy became the syndicate's secretary, while another key member of the group was General Abelardo L. Rodríguez, who was then Governor of Baja California, and they also secured investment from Mexican President Plutarco Elías Calles. They obtained permission in September 1926 and began drilling in February 1927. The company closed in July 1931, having been a financial failure; they had failed to locate any oil and one of the syndicate's partners proved to be a con man who had stolen much of their funds.

=== Final years: 1928–1940 ===
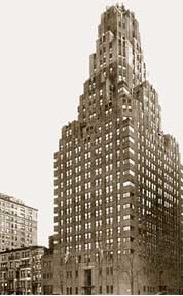
Master Apartments in 1929, around the time that Mundy took up residence there

After the failings of the Mexican oil expedition, Mundy left for New York City in June 1928. He officially separated from Ames the following month, leaving his Tilgaun home to her. In the city he embarked on a relationship with Theda Conkey Webber—a woman he had met in the autumn of 1927—and she shortly after legally changed her name to Dawn Allen. In New York, Mundy had resumed his friendship with Natacha Rambova, whom he had first met at Point Loma. Through her he was introduced to the spirit medium George Wehner, who helped develop Mundy's interest in Spiritualism. Mundy then wrote an introduction to Wehner's autobiography, A Curious Life, reflecting his own growing interest in Spiritualism. Both Rambova and Mundy and Dawn moved into the Master Apartments building, which rented its rooms to a large number of artists and writers. Mundy became involved in Nicholas Roerich's museum, which was located in the building, and travelled to London in order to convince the authorities to permit Roerich's expedition to India and in to the Himalayas; they had initially been hesitant that Roerich—who was Russian by birth—may have been an intelligence agent for the Soviet Union.

In 1928, Mundy took on Brandt and Brandt as his new literary agents, becoming a close friend of co-owner Carl Brandt. At his agent's prompting, Mundy ceased publishing with Bobbs-Merrill and switched to The Century Company, soon renamed D. Appleton-Century, who sold far more copies of his books than Bobbs-Merrill had. Both Century and Hutchinson would subsequently reissue many of Mundy's older works in the following few years. In January 1929 he registered a new company, Jeff Ramsden Inc, with two comrades. The company engaged in a variety of activities, including purchasing real estate, copyright, and inventions, although had foundered within months. The state department officially dissolved it in December 1936 for not paying tax.

Directed by John Ford, Fox Film had produced a cinematic adaptation of King of the Khyber Rifles, titled The Black Watch. Mundy disliked it, thinking that the acting was bad and describing it as "a disagreeable waste of money and an insult to the public". However, it allowed him to pay off the many debts that he owed. In March 1932, Mundy sold the film rights of The Ivory Trail to Universal Studios, who used it as the basis for Jungle Mystery, a film that was first released as a 12 episode serial and then as a full feature in 1935. In 1936, Paramount optioned Rung Ho!, although Mundy—unhappy with previous cinematic adaptations of his work—insisted on a significant level of creative control, producing a script for the film known as Fifty-Seven. 20th Century Fox also began work on their own adaptation of King of the Khyber Rifles, although this project ultimately never came to fruition.

The changing nature of the market meant that Mundy had to write an increasing number of short stories in the final decade of his life, something that he was not happy about. In this period he not only published in Adventure and Argosy but also in a wider range of magazines, such as Blue Book, Short Stories, All Aces, and Golden Fleece. He also published work in American Sunday newspaper supplements like This Week and American Weekly, as well as in the Canadian Maclean's, and the British Britannia and Eve and The Passing Show.

Mundy created a series of stories focusing on the character of Ben Quorn, the first instalments of which appeared in Adventure over the course of late 1928 and early 1929, the latter in Argosy. One of these, The Gunga Sahib, was set in the (fictional) Indian state of Narada. His final Quorn story was The Elephant Sahib for Argosy. Mundy produced a series of short stories, novelettes, and novels about the Criminal Investigation Division of India, most of which featured either Larry O'Hara or Chullunder Ghose as their protagonist. In March 1932 he published Chullunder Ghose the Guileless in Adventure. In November 1932, Century published Mundy's novel C.I.D.. Revolving around the character of Ghose, it featured an appearance of the Thuggee group. Unusually, it was only serialised after book publication, in Adventure during March and April 1933. Ghose's final appearance was in The Elephant Waits, published in Short Stories in February 1937. Mundy later rewrote The Elephant Waits as the novelette The Night the Clocks Stopped, in which Ghose was removed altogether.

From October to December 1929 Adventure serialised Mundy's The Invisible Guns of Kabul, which was then published in book form as Cock O' the North. The story had originally been commissioned for the Saturday Evening Post, but their editor George Horace Lorimer declined it on completion. However, he gradually ceased publishing his work with Adventure in this period, after they reduced both the number of issues that they released and the length of their publication. During these years he also wrote two novelettes for Everybody's Combined with Romance and four articles for The Theosophical Path.

At the Master Apartments, Mundy had written Black Light, and while he was unable to get it serialised, it was published by both Bobbs-Merril and Hutchinson in October 1930, to mixed reviews. The novel was set in India, and revolved around a man living under the domination of his mother. Taves referred to it as "one of Mundy's deepest and most rewarding novels". It was the last of Mundy's novels that the company produced as he left them shortly after; the company were upset, having felt that they had been badly treated. In the following year, Mundy focused on magazine work, producing King of the World, which was serialised in Adventure from November 1930 to February 1931; it was later published in book form as Jimgrim. The story moved towards science fiction, and entailed Jimgrim battling an antagonist named Dorje, who has discovered the scientific secrets of Atlantis and is using them in an attempt to conquer the world. His novel White Tigers, which revolved around a big game hunter and a filmmaker, was serialised in Adventure in August 1932. Another novel was Full Moon, which told the story of a secret police officer investigating the disappearance of a brigadier in India. Serialised in The American Weekly from October 1934 to January 1935, it was described by Taves as "perhaps the most intensely mythic and symbolic of all Mundy's work".

Mundy had also revived his Tros stories, producing four novelettes featuring the character which were published in Adventure from March to October 1935: "Battle Stations", "Cleopatra's Promise", "The Purple Pirate" and "Fleets of Fire", all of which were then published in a collected volume titled Purple Pirate. Mundy returned to the setting of Tibet for two of his final novels, The Thunder Dragon Gate and its sequel, Old Ugly Face, which featured the adventures of the American Tom Grange who combatted attempts by the Russian, Japanese, and German governments to seize control of the Himalayan kingdom. The Thunder Dragon Gate was serialised in The American Weekly from January to March 1937 before publication by Appleton-Century and Hutchinson, with Old Ugly Face being serialised in Maclean's between April and May 1938 before a 1940 publication by Hutchinson. Another of Mundy's final novels was East and West, a melodrama set in India that Mundy designed with cinematic adaptation in mind.

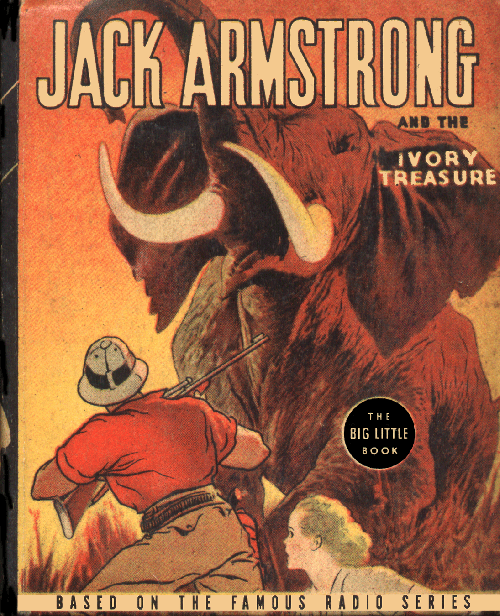
In his final years, Mundy wrote radio serials for Jack Armstrong

In 1929 he proceeded on a visit to Europe with Dawn, spending time in London, Paris, and Rome before returning to New York. Mundy and Dawn proceeded to Mexico via Cuba, settling in Yucatan, where they visited Maya archaeological sites like Chichen Itza and Uxmal before Mundy secured a divorce there in July 1931. He and Dawn married shortly after in Campeche City. They subsequently visited Europe, spending time in Hamburg before driving to Mallorca to visit Rambova, who had settled there with a new husband. During this holiday, Mundy authored a non-fiction philosophical book, Thus Spake the Devil, in which he brought in ideas from both Christian Science and Theosophy. He sent it to publishers under a pseudonym, but at the time it was rejected; it would be posthumously published as I Say Sunrise in 1947. There, Dawn discovered that she was pregnant with Mundy's child, with the couple heading to England, where she was hospitalised at the Theosophist-run Stonefield Hospital in Blackheath, Kent. Their daughter was born there in February, although died an hour later as a result of a heart malformation. To recover, the couple spent time with Mundy's cousins in Surrey, from where Mundy visited his brother in Hythe. They sailed back to the U.S. from Marseille in late 1933.

Amid the economic problems of the Great Depression, Mundy began seeking out alternative forms of income to supplement his writing, beginning to give occasional lectures. He also began regularly writing scripts for the radio show Jack Armstrong, the All-American Boy, producing around seven hundred scripts in all; these brought in a regular income until his death. At certain points he introduced Theosophical ideas into the radio serial, although nevertheless felt that by producing such "grossly commercial" material he had prostituted himself.

In the summer of 1933 they had arrived back in the U.S., and in autumn moved into a cottage near to Osprey, Florida, where their friend Rose Wilder Lane came to stay. In September 1934 they returned to the Northeast, settling into Dawn's parental home in South Manchester, Connecticut, where they remained until 1938. In 1939 Mundy and his wife moved to Anna Maria Island in Manatee County, Florida. There he was diagnosed with diabetes, a disease that had also afflicted many of his family members. Mundy retained an interest in political developments in Europe, and was critical of both fascism and Marxism-Leninism, characterising Joseph Stalin, Adolf Hitler, Benito Mussolini and Francisco Franco as the Four Horsemen of the Apocalypse. After World War II broke out in Europe in September 1939, Mundy advocated for the U.S. to join the conflict in support of the U.K. and France. Mundy died at home, during sleep, on 5 August 1940, aged 61. The certifying doctor attributed his death to myocardial insufficiency brought on by diabetes. His body was cremated on 6 August at Baynard Crematorium in St. Petersburg, Florida. Obituaries marking his passing appeared in both the American and British press.

== Personal life ==
Mundy was married five times during his life. His only biological child died stillborn, although he was a kind and indulgent stepfather to Dick Ames, the son of his fourth wife. He was known to be very generous to his family and to his friends within the Theosophical movement. His sense of humour allowed him to laugh at himself, and he was open about his own failings and shortcomings. Mundy worked seven hours a day, six days a week, typically arising at three or four in the morning. Mundy never produced a written outline of his stories prior to writing them. Very proud of his poetry, Mundy liked to insert a proverb or verse at the start of each chapter in his novels. He had been a heavy cigarette smoker throughout his life—at some points smoking fifty a day—although he quit the habit in 1936 after an illness. Ellis described Mundy as "a strange, enigmatic personality", noting that in early life he had been described as "a wastrel, confidence-trickster, barefaced liar and a womanizer" but that in later life he had changed his "philosophical approach to life ... and become better for it".

Mundy was fascinated by mysticism, and explored various religions throughout his life. After a brief involvement in Christian Science, he joined the Theosophical movement and also became very interested in Buddhism. Taves stated that through his literature, Mundy was "engaged in a lifelong discourse on philosophy and religion", including Eastern ideas on subjects like karma and reincarnation which would later be popularised by the New Age Movement.

"[Mundy's] style is simultaneously breezy and pungent, full of epigrams and laden (but never leaden) with meaning. Attention to timing, tone, feel, mood, and atmosphere, including the olfactory senses, contribute enormously to all Mundy's stories, whatever the region ... He was able to describe locales and foreign beliefs with a convincing touch of authenticity, combining knowledge from other books, popular legends, and his own travel writings and friendships with a vivid imagination, leaving the reader unable to discern what was fact and what was fiction."

— Biographer Brian Taves.

Mundy also had strong political views, expressing contempt for the British establishment and promoting an egalitarian ethos, although not so far as to become a socialist. He had been a supporter of President Franklin D. Roosevelt's New Deal although in the final years of his life became more politically conservative. The key political issue that he confronted in his work was colonialism, and he opposed imperialism regardless of the country committing it; his work contains negative portrayals of imperialistic activity by both contemporary nation-states like Britain, Russia, and Japan, as well as by the ancient Roman Empire. In keeping with his critical attitude toward the British Empire, Mundy expressed support for Indian independence. Ellis claimed that unlike many of his contemporaries, Mundy's work has not been accused of adopting a racialist attitude toward non-caucasian peoples. However, Taves believed that Mundy's depictions of indigenous Africans in The Ivory Trail were "hardly free of racism" from a contemporary perspective, but that they nevertheless were "certainly enlightened" for his time, adding that Mundy "unquestionably respected black humanity" and abhorred white supremacism.

Mundy believed in the equality of men and women. Biographer Brian Taves felt that Mundy exhibited feminist sympathies in his work, suggesting that Yasmini, the strong, independent Hindu character that he developed in 1914, was clear evidence of this. He further added that throughout the series, female characters are frequently "the leading players in his stories, ambitious, likeable, out-thinking and dominating men," with these female depictions typically being "believable [and] multi-dimensional".

== Reception and legacy ==
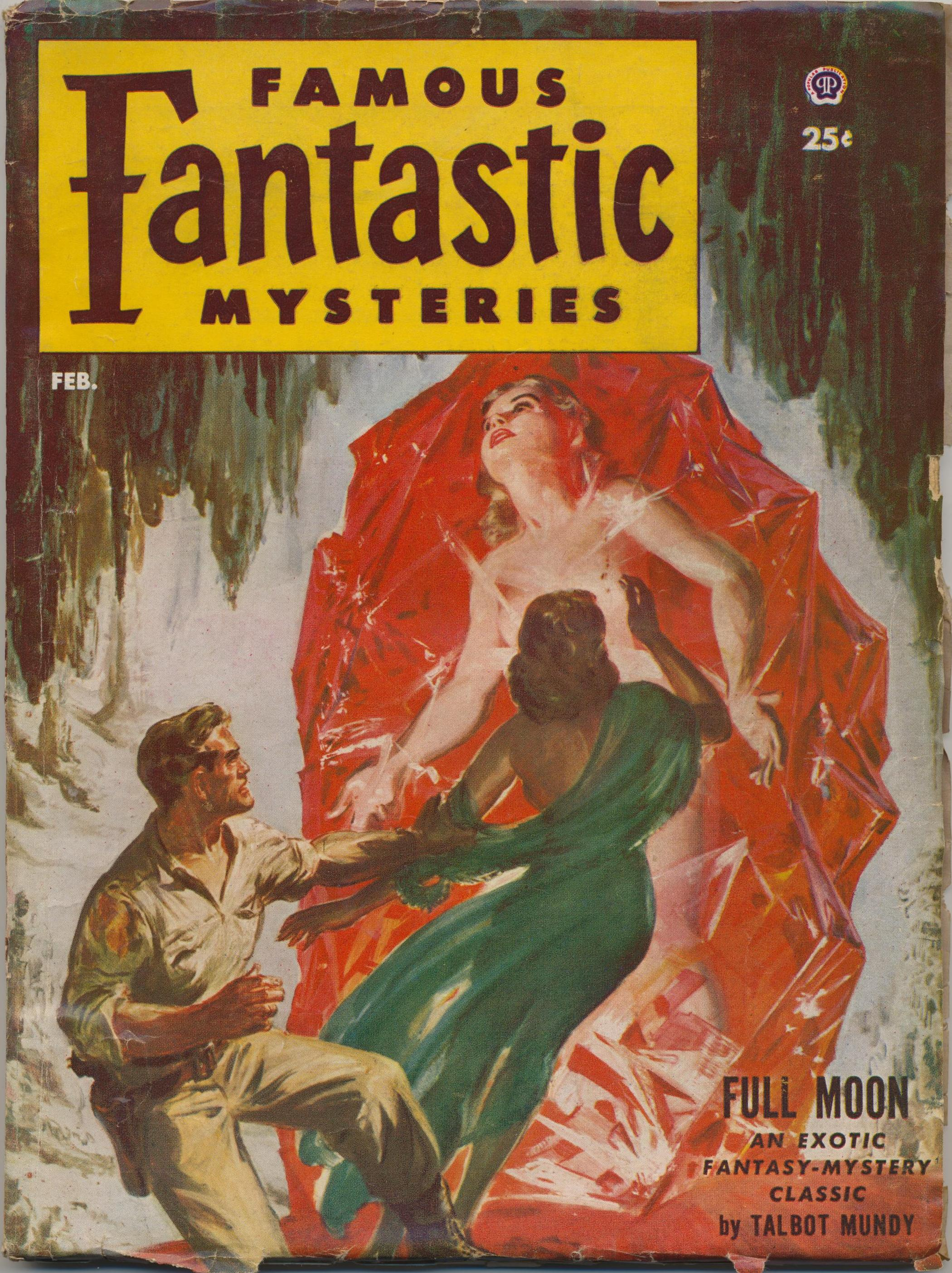
Mundy's 1935 novel Full Moon was reprinted in the February 1953 issue of Famous Fantastic Mysteries

Over the course of his career, Mundy produced 47 novels, 130 novelettes and short stories, and 23 articles, as well as one non-fiction book. Mundy biographer Peter Berresford Ellis described him as "one of the bestselling writers of adventure-fiction of his day", while Taves characterised him as "the most influential and enduring, if not the best-selling, writer of Eastern adventure of his day". Mundy was best known for King of the Khyber Rifles although his most critically acclaimed book was Om, and he personally considered Old Ugly Face to be his magnum opus. His work has been translated into a variety of European and Asian languages.

During his lifetime, Mundy's work was often compared with that of H. Rider Haggard and Rudyard Kipling, both of whose careers overshadowed his own. This was a comparison that Mundy himself disliked. Taves noted that while Kipling's work is typically seen as the model for colonial literature in the late 19th and early 20th centuries, Talbot offers "a significant counter-example", for he was writing "for the same readers and within a similar framework, [but] he was not only overtly anti-colonial but also championed Eastern philosophy and culture." Taves expressed the view that Mundy's work was "free from prejudice" even though the latter did "occasionally indulge in stereotyped remarks" within his stories. Taves believed that the "closest parallel" to Mundy was Joseph Conrad because both included philosophical concerns within their adventure fiction, however he added that Conrad's "bleaker currents of literary modernism" contrasted with Mundy's "hopeful conclusions".

Mundy's work witnessed a posthumous growth of fan interest, with Taves describing this as a "devoted but necessarily limited following". In the early 1950s, 20th Century Fox worked on a further adaptation of King of the Khyber Rifles, directed by Henry King. In 1955, Bradford M. Day compiled the first bibliography of his work, later releasing a revised version in 1978. In 1958–59, a number of Mundy's books were re-released by Gnome Press, while in 1967–71 Avon brought out an array of mass-market paperbacks. In 1983, Donald M. Grant published an edited collection of Mundy's work, Talbot Mundy, Messenger of Destiny, which also featured a bibliography and essays from two fantasy authors, Darrel Crombie and Fritz Leiber. That same year, Grant published Ellis' biography of Mundy, which was based on the Bobbs-Merrill correspondence held at Indiana University. Also in 1983, the writer-director Philip Kaufman and the producer Steve Roth announced plans for an adaptation of some of Mundy's novels, to be called Jimgrim vs. the Nine Unknown. The project was shelved after the financers, Tri-Star, pulled out following the commercial failure of Kaufman's The Right Stuff. In 1995, Mark Jaqua assembled Mundy's articles on Theosophy into a single volume, The Lama's Law. In 1998, the first website devoted to Mundy was established; it had been created by R. T. Gaut, who ran it until his death.

Mundy's work has been very influential on later writers. Those who have cited him as an influence on their own work include Robert E. Howard, E. Hoffmann Price, Robert A. Heinlein, Fritz Leiber, H. Warner Munn and C. L. Moore. Other science-fiction and fantasy writers who cited Mundy as an influence included Andre Norton, Jeremy Lane, L. Sprague de Camp, Marion Zimmer Bradley and Daniel Easterman. James Hilton's novel Lost Horizon was partly inspired by Mundy's work. S.M. Stirling's 2002 alternate-history novel The Peshawar Lancers is inspired by Mundy's adventure novels, and several of its characters share names with those of Mundy's (e.g. Athelstane King and Yasmini), albeit with different backstories (since the novel is set in a parallel 2025 in which Europe was destroyed in a natural disaster, making India the seat of the British Empire).

== Bibliography ==
A bibliography of Mundy's published books was included by Ellis in his biography.

Title	Series	Serialisation	First collected publications
Rung Ho! (For the Peace of India)	–	Adventure (February 1914)	Charles Scribner's Sons (New York, 1914); Cassell & Co. (London, 1914)
The Winds of the World	Ranjoor Singh	Adventure (July 1915)	Cassell & Co. (London, 1916); Bobbs-Merrill (Indianapolis, 1917)
King of the Khyber Rifles	Athelstan King	Everybody's (May 1916)	Bobbs-Merrill (Indianapolis, 1916); Constable & Co. (London, 1917)
Hira Singh's Tale (Hira Singh)	Ranjoor Singh	Adventure (October 1917)	Cassell & Co. (London, 1918); Bobbs-Merrill (Indianapolis, 1918)
The Ivory Trail (On the Trail of Tippoo Tib)	–	Adventure (May 1919)	Bobbs-Merrill (Indianapolis, 1919); Constable & Co. (London, 1919)
The Eye of Zeitoon (The Eye of Zeitun)	–	Romance (February 1920)	Bobbs-Merrill (Indianapolis, 1920); Hutchinson (London, 1920)
Told in the East	Three short stories	Adventure (March and July 1913; June 1915)	Bobbs-Merrill (Indianapolis, 1920)
Guns of the Gods	Yasmini	Adventure (March 1921)	Bobbs-Merrill (Indianapolis, 1921); Hutchinson (London, 1921)
Her Reputation (The Bubble Reputation)	–	–	Bobbs-Merrill (Indianapolis, 1923); Hutchinson (London, 1923)
The Nine Unknown	–	Adventure (March 1923)	Bobbs-Merrill (Indianapolis, 1924); Hutchinson (London, 1924)
Om: The Secret of Ahbor Valley	Jimgrim/Ramsden	Adventure (October 1924)	Bobbs-Merrill (Indianapolis, 1924); Hutchinson (London, 1925)
The Caves of Terror (The Gray Mahatma)	Jimgrim/Ramsden	Adventure (November 1922)	Garden City Publishing Co. (New York, 1924); Hutchinson (London, 1934)
The Soul of a Regiment	-	Adventure (February 1912)	Alex Dulfer (Sam Francisco, 1924)
The Devil's Guard (Ramsden)	Jimgrim/Ramsden	Adventure (June 1926)	Bobbs-Merrill (Indianapolis, 1926); Hutchinson (London, 1926)
Queen Cleopatra	Tros	–	Bobbs-Merrill (Indianapolis, 1929); Hutchinson (London, 1929)
Cock O' the North (The Invisible Guns of Kabul; Gup Bahadur)	–	Adventure (October, 1929)	Bobbs-Merrill (Indianapolis, 1929); Hutchinson (London, 1929)
The Hundred Days (Muhammad's Tooth)	Jimgrim/Ramsden	Adventure (December 1923)	Hutchinson (London, 1930); Century (New York, 1930)
The Marriage of Meldrum Strange	Jimgrim/Ramsden	Adventure (April 1922)	Hutchinson (London, 1930); Century (New York, 1931)
The Woman Ayisha	Jimgrim/Ramsden	Adventure (October 1927)	Hutchinson (London, 1930); Century (New York, 1931)
Black Light	–	–	Bobbs-Merrill (Indianapolis, 1930); Hutchinson (London, 1930)
W.H.: A Portion of the Record of Sir William Halfax (The Queen's Warrant; Ho for London Town!)	–	Argosy (February 1929)	Hutchinson (London, 1931); Royal Books (New York, 1953)
Jimgrim (King of the World; Jimgrim Sahib)	Jimgrim/Ramsden	Adventure (November 1930)	Century (New York, 1931); Hutchinson (London, 1931)
Jungle Jest	Short stories, Jimgrim/Ramsden	Adventure (December 1922, January 1923; August 1923)	Hutchinson (London, 1931); Century (New York, 1932)
The Lost Trooper	Jimgrim/Ramsden	Adventure (May 1922)	Hutchinson (London, 1931)
When Trails Were New	–	Argosy (October 1928)	Hutchinson (London, 1932)
C.I.D.	Jimgrim/Ramsden	Adventure (November 1933)	Hutchinson (London, 1932); Century (New York, 1933)
The Gunga Sahib	Jimgrim/Ramsden	Adventure (November 1928)	Hutchinson (London, 1933); Appleton-Century (New York, 1934)
The King in Check (Affair in Araby)		Adventure (July 1922)	Hutchinson (London, 1933); Appleton-Century (New York, 1934)
The Mystery of Khufu's Tomb		Adventure (October 1922)	Hutchinson (London, 1933); Appleton-Century (New York, 1935)
Jimgrim and Allah's Peace	Short stories; Jimgrim/Ramsden	Adventure (November 1921; December 1921)	Hutchinson (London, 1933); Appleton-Century (New York, 1936)
The Red Flame of Erinpura		Adventure (January 1927)	Hutchinson (London, 1934)
Caesar Dies (The Falling Star)		Adventure (October, 1926)	Hutchinson (London, 1934); Centaur Books (New York, 1973)
Tros of Samothrace	Short stories; Tros	Adventure (February 1925; April 1925; June 1925; August 1925; October 1925; December 1925; February 1926)	Hutchinson (London, 1934); Appleton-Century (New York, 1934)
Full Moon (There Was a Door)		American Weekly (October 1934)	Appleton-Century (New York, 1935); Hutchinson (London, 1935)

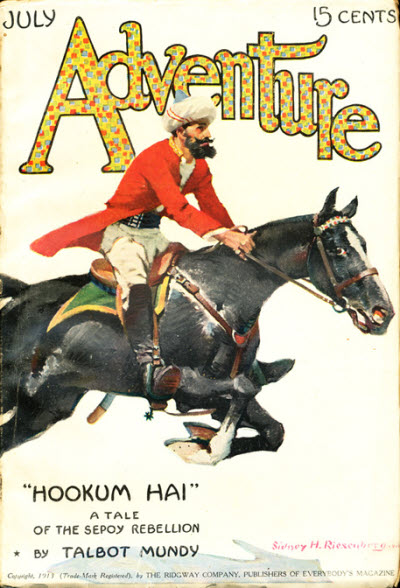
Mundy's "Hookum Hai" was the cover story in the July 1913 issue of Adventure

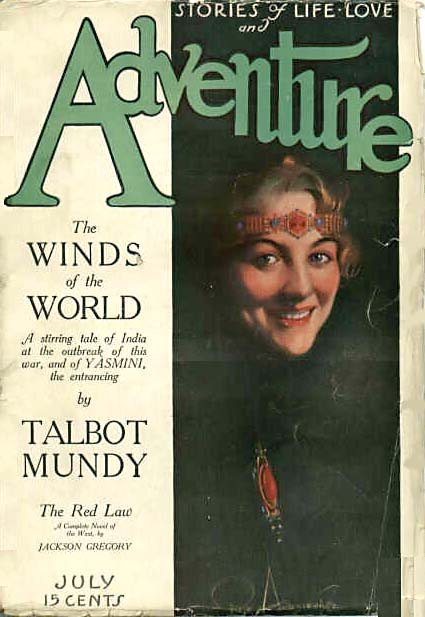
Mundy's "The Winds of the World" took the cover of the July 1915 issue of Adventure

=== Jimgrim/Ramsden ===
- Hira Singh (1918)
- The Seventeen Thieves of El-Kalil (1935)
- The Lion of Petra (1932)
- The Red Flame of Erinpura (1934)
- Jimgrim, Moses, and Mrs. Aintree (first book publication of 1922 magazine story, 2008)

=== Tros ===
- Tros of Samothrace (1925)
- Queen Cleopatra (1929)
- Purple Pirate (1935)

=== Lobsang Pun ===
- The Thunder Dragon Gate (1937)
- Old Ugly Face (1940)

=== Non-series ===
- All Four Winds: Four Novels of India (omnibus, 1932)
- Full Moon (variant title, There Was a Door, 1935)
- Romances of India (omnibus, 1936)
- East and West (variant title Diamonds See in the Dark, 1935)
- The Valiant View (Short Stories, 1939)
- Winds from the East: A Talbot Mundy Reader (Fiction, Poems and Non-Fiction, 2006)
- A Transaction in Diamonds: Talbot Mundy in the Pulps, 1911 (The Talbot Mundy Library, volume 1)
- The Soul of a Regiment (The Talbot Mundy Library, volume 2, NYP)
- In a Righteous Cause: Talbot Mundy in Adventure, 1913 (The Talbot Mundy Library, volume 3)
- The Letter of His Orders—Three Short Novels from Adventure, 1913 (The Talbot Mundy Library, volume 4)
- Love and War–The Battles of Billy Blain, 1912-16 (The Talbot Mundy Library, volume 5, NYP)
- The Sword of Iskandar- The Adventures of Dick Anthony of Arran (The Talbot Mundy Library, volume 6, NYP)

=== Yasmini of India ===
- A Soldier and a Gentleman reprinted in A Soldier and a Gentleman, Talbot Mundy in Adventure 1914-1919 (The Talbot Mundy Library, volume 7), Adventure, January 1915
- The Winds of the World, Adventure magazine, July–September 1915
- King of the Khyber Rifles, Everybody's Magazine, May 1916
- Guns of the Gods, Adventure magazine, March 3-May 3, 1921
- Caves of Terror (The Gray Mahatma), Adventure magazine, Nov 10, 1922 [Grimjim series]

== See also ==
- Talbot Mundy and Theosophy
