= The Jerusalem News =

Former Palestinian Newspaper

- With charity to all, malice toward none
- Type: Daily newspaper
- Format: Broadsheet
- Founder: Elizabeth L. McQueen
- Editor: William D. McCrackan
- Founded: December 9, 1919
- Ceased publication: June 8, 1920
- Language: English
- City: Jerusalem
- Country: Palestine
- Price: 1 piastre (5 cents)

The Jerusalem News was the first English-language newspaper in Jerusalem, existing for around six months during the British Mandate for Palestine. The paper was established in 1919 by Elizabeth Lippincott McQueen and edited by William D. McCrackan, with contributors such as John Huston Finley and Talbot Mundy.

== History ==
Following the conquest of Palestine by the British Army in 1917, which marked the first time the holy land had been under Christian rule since the crusades, many Christians interested themselves in the affairs of Palestine. One of them was William D. McCrackan, who came there with his wife in September 1919 as part of an independent party of relief workers, although he called the main impulse for traveling to the country a spiritual one. McCrackan had previously worked for The First Church of Christ, Scientist in Europe to assist in relief work during World War I, and helped form relief organizations and distribute funds in England, Germany, France, and Switzerland. He had also served as associate editor of The Christian Science Journal, Christian Science Sentinel, and The Herald of Christian Science from 1916 to 1919, but opted not to continue at the end of his term in May of that year.

The Jerusalem News was established in 1919 by Elizabeth Lippincott McQueen, a British-American woman who would later become a women's aeronautics pioneer, and who had in the aftermath of World War I served in war relief work in Palestine under Field Marshal Edmund Allenby. McQueen asked McCrackan to be the paper's editor. McCrackan wrote that there was an "urgent need for a newspaper which could maintain a policy of impartiality" in the city, and printed Abraham Lincoln's "With charity to all, malice toward none" as the paper's motto in every issue. The first issue appeared on Dec. 9, 1919, the anniversary of the taking of Jerusalem by British forces, and it bore a congratulatory message from Allenby, then High Commissioner of Egypt.

The paper's regularly scheduled, up-to-date, accurate, and impartial information was incredibly rare at the time according to author Brian Taves, since news mostly came from irregular propaganda published by various factions in the region. However there still was some bias towards the British authorities in some of the writing, and McCrackan sometimes consulted Allenby personally on pieces. This may have been a result of military censorship, which grew even more intense after the 1920 Nebi Musa riots. The paper was sold for 5 cents per issue, and was published daily except Sunday and holidays, and was printed at the Schneller Orphanage.

Red Cross Commissioner John Huston Finley was a reader and frequent contributor to the paper. Regular correspondents outside of Jerusalem in places like Cairo, Beirut, and Luxor also joined the paper. In February 1920, the British-American writer and journalist Talbot Mundy, McCrackan's co-worker and personal friend, arrived in Jerusalem. There he became the Jerusalem News' editorial assistant, being involved in writing articles, reporting on current events, proof reading, and editing. McQueen, McCrackan, Mundy, and the others involved with the paper witnessed and reported on the increasing conflict between Arab and Jewish populations within the city, including the 1920 Nebi Musa riots. At one point during the build up to the riots, McQueen addressed a group of would-be rioters and was successful in pacifying them, partially as a result of the novelty of a woman addressing a group of men. Afterwards the Grand Mufti of Jerusalem Kamil al-Husayni sent McQueen a letter thanking her. Historian Stuart E. Knee also credits McCrackan with bringing together Finley, the Grand Mufti, and the Military Governor of Jerusalem Ronald Storrs during this period.

The Jerusalem News ceased publication on June 8, 1920. The end of the paper's publication was explained by its having been "a wartime publication" and that the start of a British civil administration necessitated a different kind of paper. According to McCrackan, the paper "established the fact that a daily newspaper in the English language could be brought out in Jerusalem". He saw the paper as strictly connected to the war relief effort, and left Palestine in July 1920 after the British civil administration assumed control of the city. Mundy on the other hand wanted to continue work in Jerusalem, and disagreed with McCrackan's decision to return to New York, leading to the two falling out. In 1922, McCrackan published an account of his time in Jerusalem with an introduction written by Lord Bryce, but did not mention Mundy.

McCrackan was critical of the Zionist slogan "a land without a people for a people without a land". He later said of it, "We used to read in our papers the slogan of Zionism, 'to give back a people to a Land without a People,' while the truth was that Palestine was already well-peopled with a population which was rapidly increasing from natural causes."

== Sources ==
- Beasley, Norman (1957). The Continuing Spirit: The Story of Christian Science Since 1920. George Allen & Unwin.
- Gilbert, Martin (1997). Jerusalem in the Twentieth Century. Pimlico. ISBN 978-0-7126-7378-5.
- Ellis, Peter Berresford (1984). The Last Adventurer: The Life of Talbot Mundy. Donald M. Grant. ISBN 0-937986-70-4.
- Knee, Stuart E. (1979). The Concept of Zionist Dissent in the American Mind, 1917-1941. R. Speller. ISBN 978-0-8315-0177-8.
- Palmer, Michael (20 August 2012). "Elizabeth Lippincott McQueen Papers". Pictures & Conversations. Claremont Colleges. Archived from the original on 2012-11-01.
- Taves, Brian (2006). Talbot Mundy, Philosopher of Adventure: A Critical Biography. McFarland and Company. ISBN 0-7864-2234-3.
- McCrackan, William Denison (1922). The New Palestine. Cape.
- Muir, Diana (Spring 2008). "'A Land without a People for a People without a Land'" (online ed.). Middle East Quarterly. 15 (2).
