= King of the Khyber Rifles =

1916 novel by Talbot Mundy

- Cover to the hardback 1st edition
- Author: Talbot Mundy
- Genre: Adventure novel
- Publisher: Bobbs-Merrill
- Publication date: 1916
- Publication place: United Kingdom
- Media type: Print (hardback and paperback)

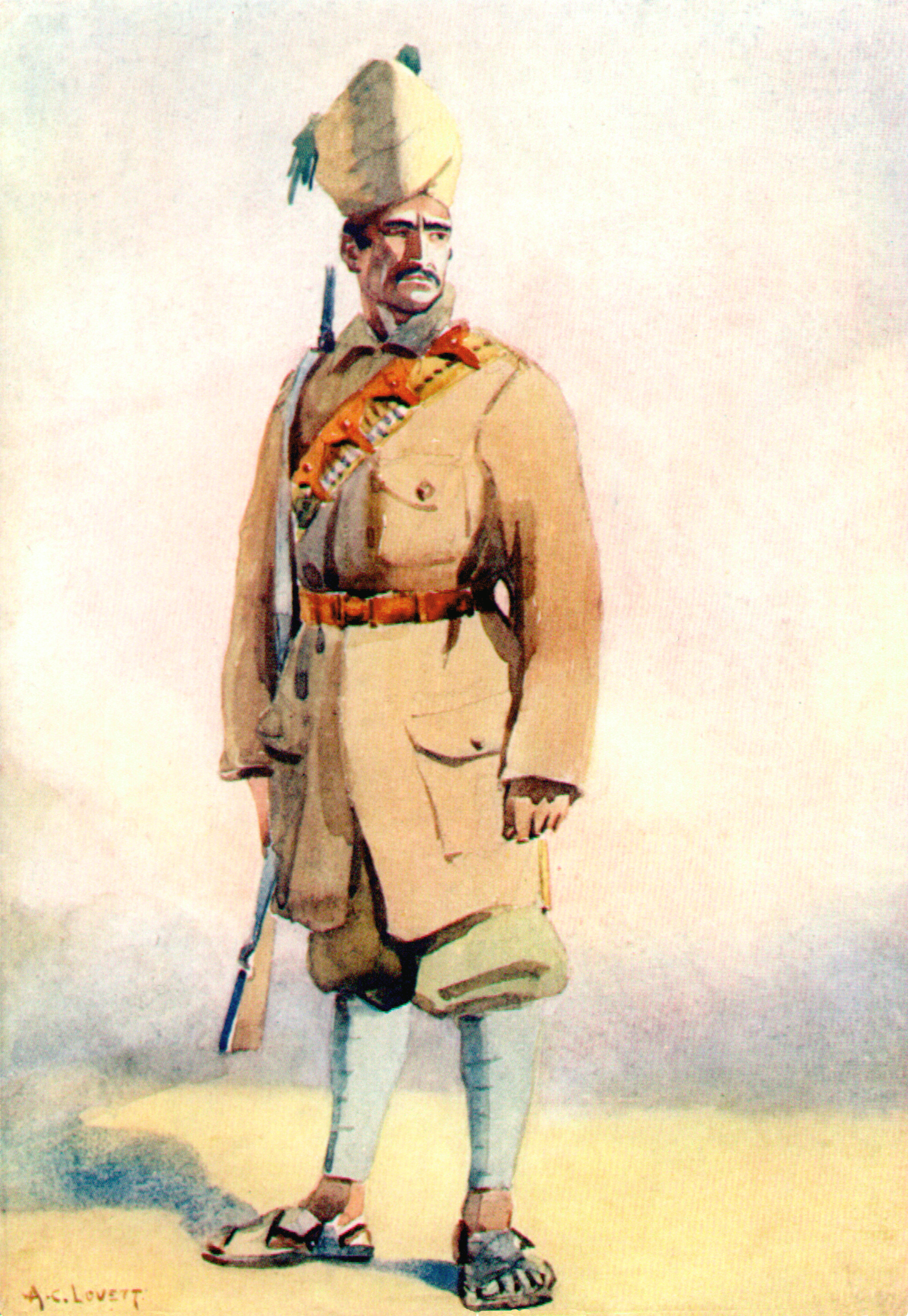
Khyber Rifles. Watercolour by Maj AC Lovett, 1910.

King of the Khyber Rifles is a novel by British writer Talbot Mundy. Captain Athelstan King is a secret agent for the British Raj at the beginning of the First World War. Heavily influenced both by Mundy's own unsuccessful career in India and by his interest in theosophy, it describes King's adventures among the (mostly Muslim) tribes of the north with the mystical woman adventuress, princess Yasmini and the Turkish mullah Muhammed Anim. Like Greenmantle by John Buchan, also first published in 1916, it deals with the possibility that Turkey might try to stir Muslims into a jihad against the British Empire.

The Khyber Rifles was and is an actual regiment.

What was to be Mundy's third novel was originally serialised in Everybody's Magazine in nine parts from May 1916 illustrated by Joseph Clement Coll. It was published in book form in November 1916.

The book gave many characters and themes to the book The Peshawar Lancers, including the main character, Athelstane King.

== Adaptations ==
The first film adaptation was The Black Watch (UK title King of the Khyber Rifles), released in 1929 and starring Victor McLaglen and Myrna Loy. A second version, King of the Khyber Rifles (1953) featured Tyrone Power and Terry Moore. Apart from the title and the Khyber Pass setting, it has little in common with Mundy's novel. A third adaptation, to have been adapted by Philip Kaufman and released by TriStar Pictures was planned but never made.

A Classics Illustrated comic book of Mundy's book was printed in 1953, No. 107.
