= The Peshawar Lancers =

2002 novel by S. M. Stirling

- Cover of the 2003 mass market edition
- Author: S. M. Stirling
- Cover artist: Duane Myers
- Language: English
- Genre: Alternate history
- Publisher: Roc Books
- Publication date: 2002
- Publication place: United States
- Media type: Print (hardcover and paperback)
- Pages: 483 (paperback)
- ISBN: 0-451-45873-7
- OCLC: 51390580
- Preceded by: "Shikari in Galveston"

The Peshawar Lancers is an alternate history, steampunk, post-apocalyptic fiction adventure novel by S. M. Stirling, with its point of divergence occurring in 1878 when the Earth is struck by a devastating meteor shower. The novel's plot takes place in 2025, when the British Empire has become the powerful Angrezi Raj and is gradually recolonizing the world, alongside other nations and empires that were able to survive. The novel was published in 2002, and was a Sidewise Award nominee for best long-form alternate history.

Stirling also wrote a novella, Shikari in Galveston, which is set in the same background as The Peshawar Lancers but occurs several years earlier. It was published in the alternate history collection Worlds That Weren't.

== Background ==
The story details a world where a heavy meteor shower, known as "the Fall", impacted with catastrophic force across much of the Northern Hemisphere in 1878, creating a massive dust cloud that blots out the sun. This in turn causes the collapse of Industrialized civilization, which was unable to survive without the ability to raise crops in winter-like conditions that lasted for three years. In order to survive, the British Government, under the leadership of Queen Victoria and Prime Minister Benjamin Disraeli, employed the Royal Navy and all merchant shipping to evacuate the population of the British Isles to its colonies in India, Australasia, and South Africa over the next several years. After martial law breaks down in 1881, the rioting British lower classes storm the remaining military outposts in London; unable to escape, Disraeli is killed by rioters and becomes a martyr. The British Isles are abandoned, initially becoming the home of groups of degenerate cannibalistic savages, most of which quickly consume each other to extinction, and are only cautiously recolonized in the 20th century. By the time relatively normal weather returns, nine-tenths of the former population in the UK, as well as millions of other people around the world, have died as a result of the disaster.

The book is set in the year 2025, after the world's climate has recovered from the devastation of the meteors. The political geography of the time is dramatically different from our own world, and innovations such as the airship and Stirling engine are only beginning to reach prominence while the airplane and internal combustion engine were still undeveloped. The Angrezi Raj (formerly the British Empire), centered in its former colonies in the South Pacific and Indian Oceans, is the most powerful nation on Earth. It stands alongside other surviving world powers, including France-outre-mer (a European-settled French North Africa), the Caliphate of Damascus (a united Middle East), the Empire of Dai-Nippon (a Japanese-ruled China and Far East), and the Russian Empire (a remnant of the original, now located in Central Asia).

Athelstane King is an officer of the Peshawar Lancers, a regiment that guards the northern borders of the Angrezi Raj, who becomes involved in an adventure filled with political intrigue, numerous chases, harrowing escapes, swashbuckling, and the exploration of a world that seems to be forever trapped in the Victorian era. The novel features many similarities to the styles of writing of such famous authors as Rudyard Kipling and H. Rider Haggard, which serve as both homage and satire to their works, along with elements of colonialist attitude, cultism, and general fantasy.

== The world of The Peshawar Lancers ==
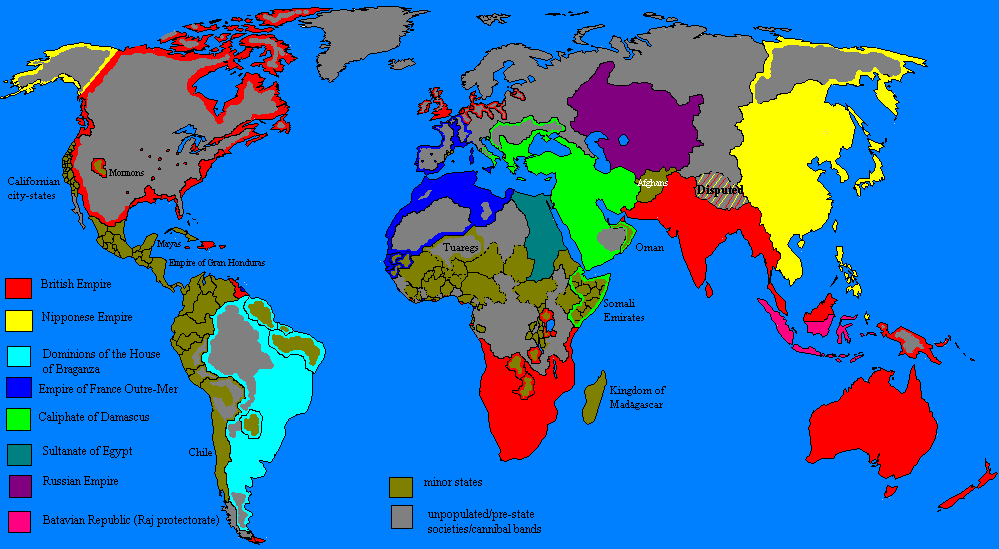
A map of the world of The Peshawar Lancers, set in 2025 C.E.

=== The Angrezi Raj ===
In 2025, the Angrezi Raj is the most powerful nation in the world. The King-Emperor John II rules almost half of mankind. The Raj is divided into three main regions, each of which has a significant representation in the Raj Parliament in Delhi:

Viceroyalty of India
The location to which the British government was evacuated after the Fall (along with 1.5 million refugees), India suffered from drought, famine, and a Second Mutiny, in which millions of starving Indians rose against the British after hearing rumors of food being shipped back to Britain. The Second Mutiny ended in the 1890s, and solidified the government's relationship with loyal groups in India. By 2025, the Viceroyalty of India is home to some 130 million people, and includes what would have become the nations of India, Pakistan, Myanmar, Malaysia, Singapore, Bangladesh, Sri Lanka and half of Thailand. Nepal is a client kingdom. Delhi is the capital of the Raj.
Viceroyalty of the Cape
The Viceroyalty of the Cape was the destination of some 500,000 British refugees after the Fall. By 2025, the Cape is a staunchly conservative Viceroyalty (the center of the Tories), and also has a nascent nationalistic movement to break away from the Raj. It includes what would have become the nations of South Africa, Lesotho, Eswatini, Namibia, Malawi, Angola, Mozambique, Tanzania, Zambia, Zimbabwe and portions of Kenya. It is home to some 40 million people. The Cape's ruling white elite resorts to various legal stratagems to keep most non-whites disenfranchised.
Viceroyalty of Australia
The Viceroyalty of Australia became the home of some one million British refugees. By 2025, Australia is staunchly liberal, and is often at odds with the Cape. Australia is the centre of the Whig Party (the Party of Athelstane and Cassandra King). Australia includes all of our world's Australia, New Zealand, New Guinea, and various Pacific islands. It is home to some 20 million people. Australia also has small colonies in the Pacific Northwest coast of North America.
Other territories
The Angrezi Raj also includes the protectorates of Madagascar and the Batavian Republic (under the rule of the descendants of Dutch refugees from the Fall), territories such as the British Isles (which would begin to be recolonized in the early 20th century, mostly in England and Wales more than in Scotland and Ireland), and various outposts around the world. As seen on the map, it is attempting to re-colonize other parts of Europe such as Denmark, Germany and Poland, though its hold is tenuous, mainly along coasts and up major rivers. The Empire also claims all of the former United States, Canada, Newfoundland and northern Mexico, but rules little of it politically aside from outposts scattered across the coasts.

=== The Russian Empire ===
During the retreat southwards in 1880 from Kazan to central Asia, Grand Duke Nicolae, the de facto Czar, was told of a nun who was having visions of the future. Although cannibalism was rampant among the refugees, she had not been touched. When her dreams of the future proved useful, Nicolae ordered her kept alive at any cost. The Russian elite turned away from God after seeing the destruction of the Fall, and turned to worshiping Chernobog instead.

Centered in Samarkand, Russia is roundly feared and despised for its Satan worshipping, and the ritualistic cannibalism used to terrorize the empire's Uzbek and Tajik subjects. Russia's Serpent Throne is kept afloat by the Sisterhood of True Dreamers, the descendants of the nun, and others like her. The males go mad from the dreams at puberty, so the females are the ones who are used. The Okhrana, Russia's secret police, proves to be a doubly effective espionage agency with the Dreamers' help.

Bokhara is where the Cult of Malik Nous (the "Peacock Angel" worshipers) are headquartered. The priests have developed a cult based around the worship of Chernobog, after an old Slavic god of death (to which seem to be mutated elements of the Yazidi belief in the Peacock Angel). The extreme members of the cult desire to bring about the end of mankind. They are eager for another Fall to occur. These plotters are told that by killing the Raj's royal family, as well as Athelstane and Cassandra King, humanity will die, thus pleasing Chernobog.

=== Other empires ===
==== The Empire of Dai-Nippon ====
Dai-Nippon (the Empire of the Dragon Throne) consists of a Japanese-ruled China and the Far East, and is the Raj's main rival. The capital is Beijing (still known as Peking). Colonies exist as far away as Alaska. Skirmishes do occur between the Raj and Dai-Nippon, with two conflicts having been waged over Siam. Akahito is the Emperor of Dai-Nippon in 2025.

==== The Caliphate of Damascus ====
Formed after the collapse of the Ottoman Empire during the Fall, the Caliphate stretches from Persia to Hungary. Although not nearly as advanced as the Raj or Dai-Nippon, the Caliphate represents a daunting threat to any potential invader. Skirmishes with France-outre-Mer have resulted in the loss of Sicily, and skirmishes with the Raj have resulted in the loss of Zanzibar, Bahrain, and Aden. Slavery is very common in the Caliphate.

==== France-outre-mer ====
Forged by French, Spanish, and various other refugees from Continental Europe, France-outre-mer is quite friendly with the Raj, not least because of the constant threat of the Caliphate. Centered in Algiers, France is now in the process of reclaiming European France, and is in negotiations with the Raj to rebuild the Suez Canal; it also maintains a hold over the coasts of Spain and Portugal. During the novel, King-Emperor John II arranges for his daughter Sita to marry the heir to the throne of France-outre-mer, leading to speculation of a possible union between the two empires. As of 2025, Napoleon VI is the Emperor of France-outre-mer.

=== The rest of the world ===
Most of Europe, parts of North America, and equatorial Africa is inhabited by cannibal tribes and bands. Smaller empires include the Dominion of Braganza, a shadowy nation centred in Rio de Janeiro, reigned over by Dom Pedro and ruled by a succession of caudillos; the Sultanate of Egypt, eyed by the Caliphate of Damascus, France-outre-mer, and the Angrezi Raj for its access to the ruined Suez Canal; and the Emirate of Afghanistan, which serves as a buffer between the Raj and Russia. In the now long-destroyed United States, several Californian theocratic city states enjoy some independence by playing the Raj off against Dai-Nippon, and regions near the Gulf of Mexico are inhabited by the Seven Tribes, relatively civilized peoples who are loosely allied with the Raj. Other semi-civilised powers in North America include the Kaijun, Cherokee, Kumanch, and Mehk peoples, as well as a small Mormon enclave near the Great Salt Lake.

== Plot ==
The story takes place in the year 2025, in a world where the British Empire, now centered in India, remains the dominant world power. A series of environmental disasters in the 1870s has stopped the advancement of technology and forced the great empires to move south.

Athelstane King, a cavalry officer in the Peshawar Lancers, and his friend, Sikh Daffadar Narayan Singh, are ordered to go on medical leave after being wounded in battle. Russian agent Vladimir Obromovich Ignatieff and psychic Sister Yasmini are on their way into the British Raj to kill both King and his sister, Cassandra, a brilliant scientist. Ignatieff, disguised as an impious Muslim, makes a contract with Bengali separatists to kill Cassandra. After escaping one attempt on his life, King decides to leave for Oxford in disguise, but on the train, he is nearly killed again by the Pashtun assassin Ibrahim Khan. When King confronts Khan over who hired him, he makes the connection that a Russian has been sending the assassins. Khan, upon hearing this, swears vengeance at being misled and agrees to follow King.

King returns home, where Singh's father, Ranjit, tells King the truth behind his father's death. King's mother sends him to Delhi to find Elias bar-Binyamin, a Jewish financier who owes the King family a favor, to gain further information. To ensure Cassandra's safety, King's friend Sir Manfred Warburton arranges for her to be hired by the royal palace as tutor to King-Emperor John II's daughter, Princess Sita. While there, Cassandra meets Sita's brother, Prince Charles, and finds herself interested in him.

In Delhi, on his way to the bar-Binyamin residence, King is attacked by assassins and the fight spills over into Warburton's residence. Meanwhile, Warburton has been critically injured by Ignatieff and a traitorous British agent, Richard Allenby. Ignatieff and Allenby escape, and Allenby summons the police. In order to help his friends escape, Narayan Singh stays behind to face the police. Allenby orders Singh taken to his own house for interrogation.

The group finds bar-Binyamin and his son David. They go to Allenby's residence to expose him as a traitor and rescue Narayan Singh. Unknown to them, French agent Henri de Vascogne is leading a second group to do the same thing. This second group includes Cassandra, Charles, Sita, and Sita's bodyguard. Both groups catch Allenby, Ignatieff, and a cult of Kali worshippers in the middle of a cannibal sacrifice. Sita's bodyguard is killed defending them, and David bar-Elias destroys Allenby's home with a homemade explosive. Sita and her group are confronted by the King-Emperor himself. He is also making plans for a state visit to France on the Imperial zeppelin Garuda. King's group makes a secretive journey to Bombay and kills Allenby, while Cassandra's group escort the King-Emperor to his zeppelin.

As the Garuda prepares to take off, King's group sneaks on board. The captain takes the King-Emperor hostage and reveals that he has planted evidence implicating other governments in the assassination attempt, in order to trigger a major war. He blows himself up, killing himself and King-Emperor John and damaging the Garuda critically. King kills Ignatieff in a brutal sword duel, with help from Ibrahim Khan.

Air pirates force the ship down. As the guards hold off the raiders, Ibrahim Khan and Sir Manfred are sent to get help. The Peshawar Lancers arrive to drive away the raiders and guide the survivors to safety. Prince Charles marries Cassandra, and Yasmini marries King.

== Major themes ==
Though The Peshawar Lancers is set in 2025, 23 years into the future from when the novel was published, Stirling does not use 21st century technology. Stirling postulates that without the resources and innovation of Europe and North America, technological advancement would have been slowed due to the local conditions of the surviving nations. Technology is progressing, though by time of the novel's setting, but still lags behind our level of technology. Air travel is done by hydrogen-lifted airship and motor vehicles are still rare. Plus there are occasional steampunk incursions like Babbage engines. In terms of biology, however, the Raj equals if not surpasses us in some fields.

Unlike previous Stirling novels that preceded The Peshawar Lancers, there is less warfare and violence than one would expect considering Stirling's earlier works and instead focuses on conspiracy, espionage and diplomacy.

One reviewer commented that The Peshawar Lancers had an "eerie prophetic resonance" with current events. Throughout the novel there are various terrorist tactics used to defeat the protagonists, including the mid-air explosion of an airship. Also reviewer noted the possible theme of fundamentalism vs. secularism. Whether this theme was intended by Stirling is unknown.

== Literary significance and reception ==
Steven H Silver called the novel an "action-filled adventure through a future reminiscent of the British Raj" and described the characters as being "sympathetic and realistic despite the alternate world which they inhabit." Silver, however, found the amount of research that Stirling did to write the novel to have slowed down the plot and he also complained about the foreign terms throughout the novel that were devoid of translation or definition. In a second review of the novel, Silver had more negative things to say of the characters describing them to be "more like archetypes than like individuals" and also having "lack of dimensions." Don Harlow called it a fun story, but agreed with Silver that Stirling failed to tell the reader the meaning of some of the foreign words used and even corrected the author on the spelling of some words. In an interview, Stirling stated he got the vocabulary for the novel from dictionaries and a Hobson-Jobson that Harry Turtledove gave him as a Christmas present.

The New England Science Fiction Association review complimented Stirling on creating a detailed and fascinating society, though remarked that society in general had not changed since the original point of divergence 150 years ago. Regardless of that, the reviewer highly recommended the novel. A review on BNET called the novel a "pretty cool alternate history" that took "a while to warm up, but it ends explosively."

Paul Di Filippo called the novel "simply the best uchronia in years." He complimented Stirling on the depth of his world building and skillful use of historical personages. Filippo expressed favor for the various characters and especially liked the antagonism between Narayan Singh and Ibrahim Khan.

== References to other works ==
Stirling wrote the novel as a homage to the historical-adventure field. Athelstane King and other characters are inspired by Talbot Mundy's King of the Khyber Rifles. One reviewer also called the novel an "updated version of Kipling's Kim.". There are also references to Sherlock Holmes as a fictional character and a portrait of Harry Flashman in the King family residence of Rexin Hall.
