= The Black Watch (film) =

1929 film by John Ford

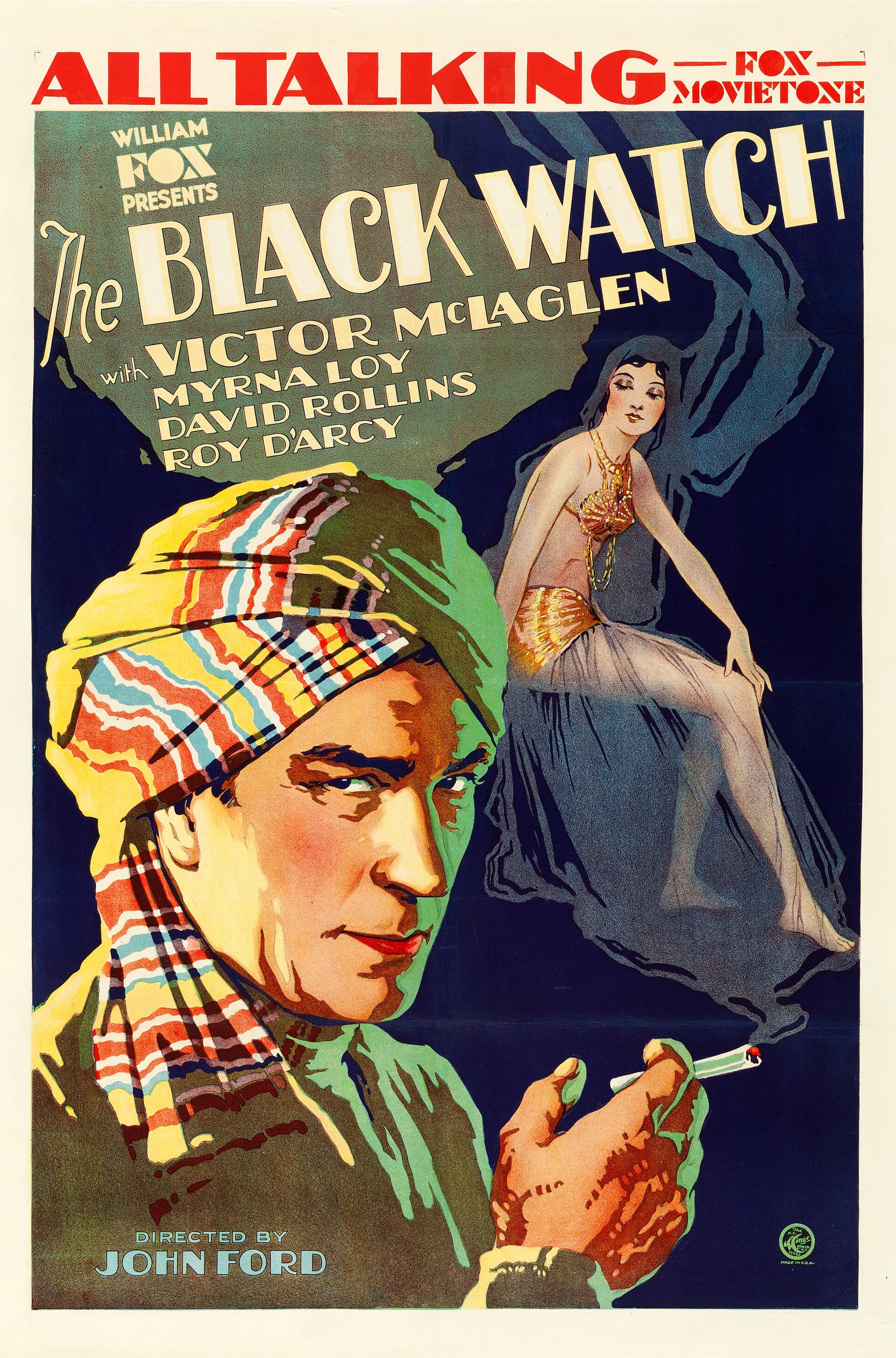
- Theatrical release poster
- Directed by: John Ford
- Written by: James Kevin McGuinness; John Stone
- Based on: King of the Khyber Rifles (novel) by Talbot Mundy
- Produced by: Winfield R. Sheehan
- Starring: Victor McLaglen; Myrna Loy; David Torrence; Roy D'Arcy
- Cinematography: Joseph H. August
- Edited by: Alex Troffey
- Music by: William Kernell
- Production company: Fox Film Corporation
- Distributed by: Fox Film Corporation
- Release date: May 8, 1929 (US)
- Running time: 93 minutes
- Country: United States
- Language: English

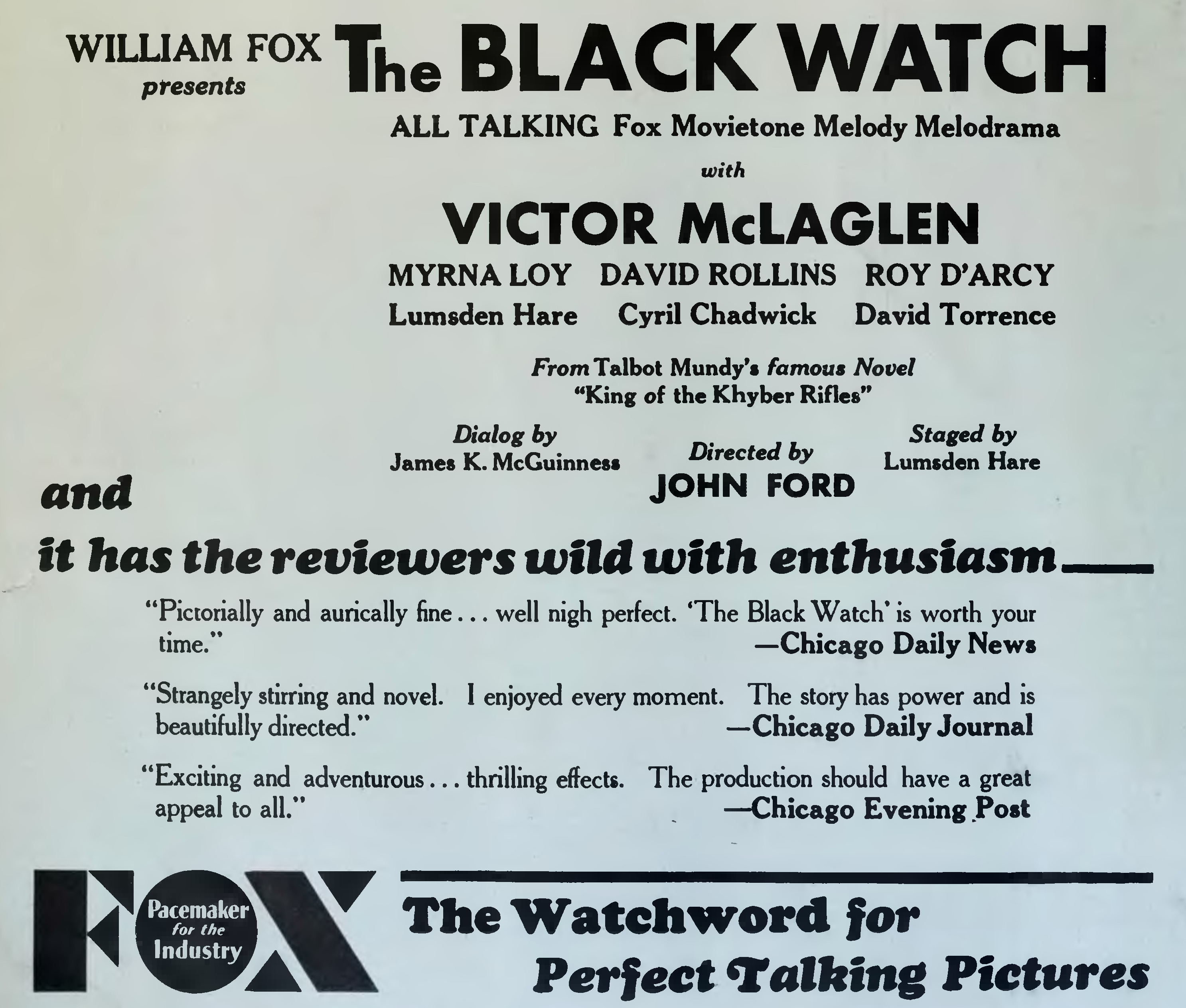
Ad in The Film Daily

The Black Watch is a 1929 American sound (All-Talking) pre-Code adventure epic film directed by John Ford and starring Victor McLaglen, Myrna Loy, and David Torrence. It was written by John Stone, based on the 1916 novel King of the Khyber Rifles by Talbot Mundy, with dialogue by James Kevin McGuinness. The film features an uncredited 21-year-old John Wayne working as an extra; he also worked in the arts and costume department for the film. This was director John Ford's first sound film.

The Black Watch entered the public domain in 2025.

The full movie

== Plot ==
A captain in the British Army's Black Watch regiment is assigned to a secret mission in India just as his company is called to France at the outbreak of war in August 1914. His covert assignment results in his being considered a coward by his fellows, a suspicion confirmed when he becomes involved in a drunken brawl in India that results in the apparent death of another officer. He goes to stop a mysterious woman named Yasmani from leading a Pashtu tribe in a holy war against the British. After falling in love with the captain, following a skirmish in which the tribesmen are killed by British soldiers using machine guns, Yasmani dies in his arms. The captain returns to his regiment.

== Cast ==
- Victor McLaglen as Capt. Donald Gordon King
- Myrna Loy as Yasmani
- David Torrence as Field Marshal
- David Rollins as Lt. Malcolm King
- Cyril Chadwick as Maj. Twynes
- Lumsden Hare as Colonel of the Black Watch
- Roy D'Arcy as Rewa Ghunga
- David Percy as Soloist, Black Watch Officer
- Mitchell Lewis as Mohammed Khan
- Claude King as General in India
- Walter Long as Harrim Bey
- Francis Ford as Maj. MacGregor
- Frederick Sullivan as General's Aide
- Richard Travers as Adjutant
- Pat Somerset as O'Connor, Black Watch Officer
- Joseph Diskay as Muezzin
- Joyzelle Joyner as Dancer
- Gregory Gaye as a 42nd Highlander (uncredited)
- Mary Gordon as Sandy's Wife (uncredited)
- Bob Kortman as a 42nd Highlander (uncredited)
- Tom London as a 42nd Highlander (uncredited)
- Jack Pennick as a 42nd Highlander (uncredited)
- Randolph Scott as a 42nd Highlander (uncredited)
- Phillips Smalley as the Doctor (uncredited)
- Lupita Tovar in a Bit Part (uncredited)
- John Wayne as a 42nd Highlander (uncredited)

== Production ==
After John Ford had completed filming, additional dialogue scenes written by James Kevin McGuinness and directed by Lumsden Hare were added which Ford detested. Myrna Loy was loaned to Fox Films by Warner Bros. for this film. To avoid violating the Motion Picture Producers and Distributors of America rule against miscegenation, Loy's character Yasmani is established as being white and a descendant of Alexander the Great prior to any romance with Captain King.

== See also ==
- List of American films of 1929
- List of early sound feature films (1926–1929)
