= William D. McCrackan =

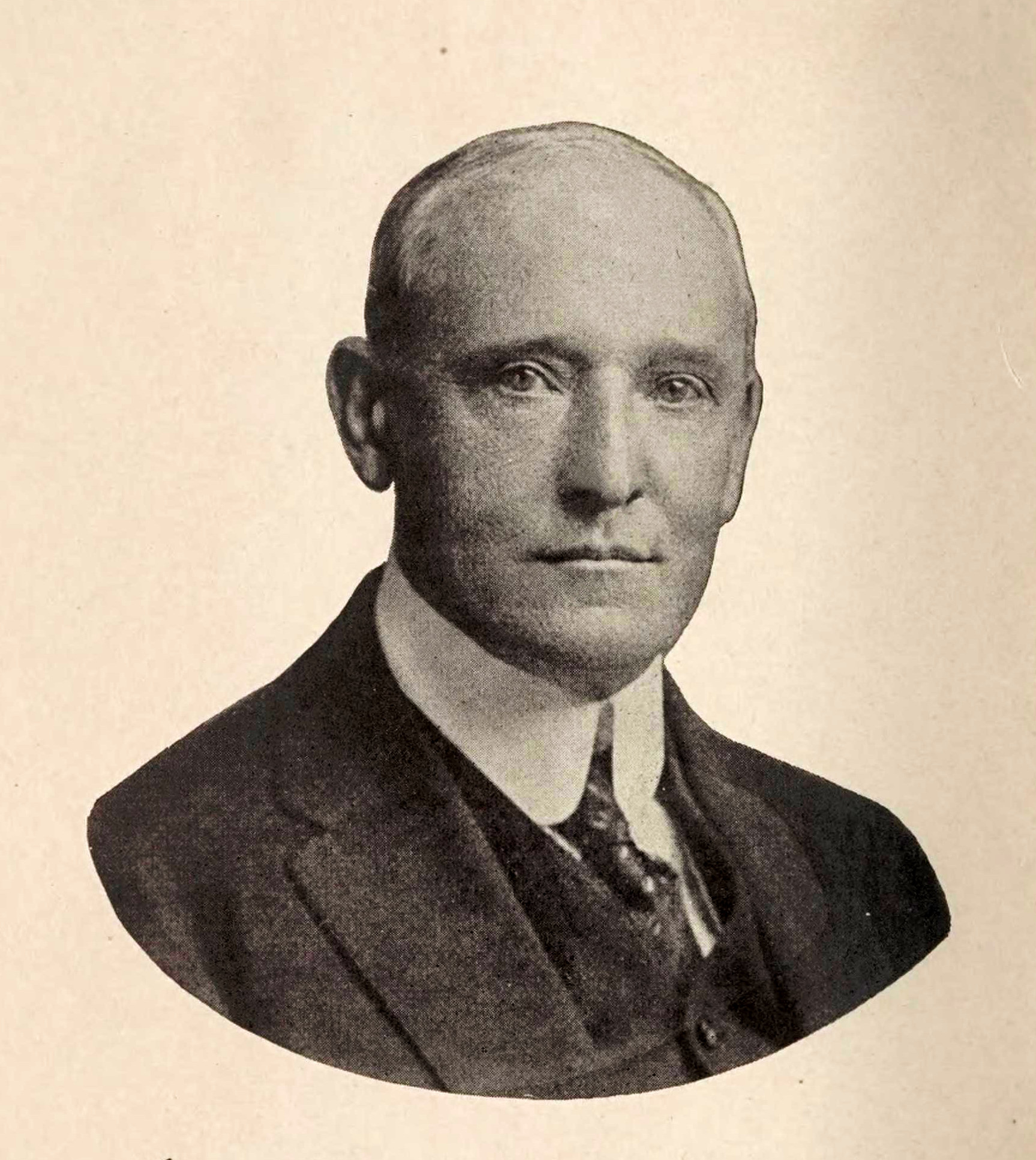
- Frontispiece from McCrackan's autobiography An American Abroad And At Home
- Born: February 12, 1864; Munich, Kingdom of Bavaria
- Died: June 12, 1923 (aged 59); New York City, US

Signature
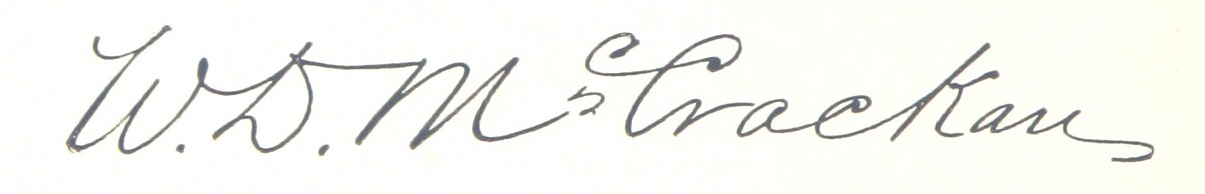

William Denison McCrackan (Note: McCrackan's middle name is also sometimes spelled Dennison.) (February 12, 1864 – June 12, 1923) was an American journalist and author of books on history and travel. In 1900, he converted to Christian Science and became a Christian Science practitioner, teacher and lecturer. In 1919, he was involved in the founding of the Jerusalem News, the first English-language newspaper published in Palestine.

== Life ==
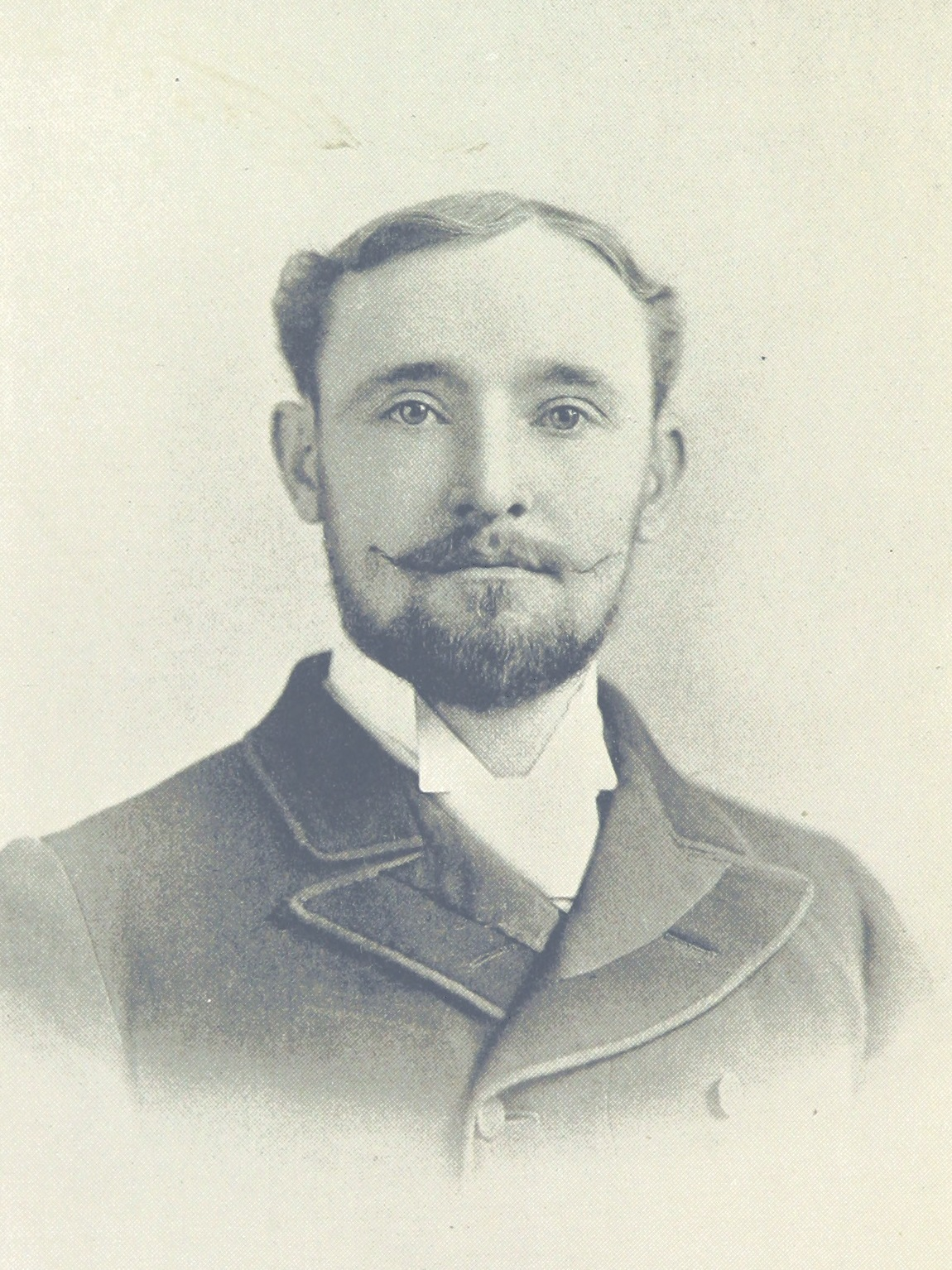
Frontispiece from The Rise of the Swiss Republic (1892)

McCrackan was born on February 12, 1864, in Munich, then part of the Kingdom of Bavaria. His great-grandfather was Scottish and immigrated to New Haven, Connecticut around the time of the French and Indian War. He had his early education in Switzerland, Germany and France before coming to the United States where he graduated from St. Paul's School in Concord, New Hampshire, and Trinity College in Hartford in 1885. He studied at Yale and afterwards traveled to Europe to continue his education at the Heidelberg University in Germany. He lived in Europe for several years before returning to the United States. In 1892 McCrackan wrote The Rise of the Swiss Republic, a study of democratic governance through the example of the Swiss. The book was highly successful, and was used as a textbook in schools and colleges. As one reviewer wrote: "Had Mr. McCrackan written no other book it would have obtained for him a secure place in this high order of literature." McCrackan joined the American Historical Association; and in 1894 published two more books, Romance and Teutonic Switzerland, a book on history and travel in Switzerland; and Swiss Solutions of American Problems, a highly praised political book on direct government drawing on James Bryce's work on democracies.

He lectured, particularly in New York, and became known for his books on history and travel. Politically progressive, he was well known in literary circles, was a member of the Authors' Club in New York City and was friends with figures such as Hamlin Garland, Henry George and Lord Bryce. His studies of Swiss government led him to become an "enthusiastic supporter" of direct democracy, believing that "if the people could express and execute their will directly, all political questions would be rightly adjusted" and lead to an end of social and economic inequalities. His interest in direct democracy, as well as his association with progressives like Garland and George, made him a supporter of Georgian economics, and he served as President of the Manhattan Single Tax Club in 1899 and 1900. He also advocated for reforms such as referendums and proportional representation. In addition, McCrackan was a frequent contributor to B. O. Flower's progressive magazine The Arena.

McCrackan converted to Christian Science in 1900, He wrote that he was "deeply stirred by the distraught social, economic and political conditions in the world" and that "Christian Science presented itself to me at the very start as the complete answer to the questions which were harassing me" and described the religion as "experiencing a new birth." He took classes from Christian Science teachers Augusta Emma Stetson and Edward A. Kimball in April and June 1900 respectively. McCrackan became active with the church organization, first serving as Committee on Publication for the state of New York for three years. In that function, he wrote two articles for the North American Review addressing articles they had recently published by Mark Twain, which had ridiculed Christian Science. He sent his articles to Twain, which Twain replied he had read "with admiration and with profit". McCrackan later called on Twain, and though they remained in disagreement regarding religion, they developed a cordial relationship. The last time McCrackan met with Twain, his wife was very ill and Twain, who wrote numerous articles critical of the religion, told McCrackan that he would gladly ask McCrackan to pray for her, except that his wife would rather die.

McCrackan, a Christian Science practitioner and teacher, began lecturing on the religion in 1904 and was elected First Reader of The Mother Church in 1905. Mary Baker Eddy, the founder of the church, requested his services proof reading her book Science and Health with Key to the Scriptures in 1904 and again in 1907. She also appointed him to represent the church at The National Arbitration and Peace Congress held in Carnegie Hall in New York that year. He later became an associate editor of The Christian Science Journal and the Christian Science Sentinel from 1916 to 1919, in the middle of which time he served as President of the Mother Church from 1917 to 1918. He was also a frequent contributor to the church's periodicals, and helped translate Science and Health into French, in addition to lecturing in French and German.

During World War I, McCrackan helped organize relief committees to distribute aid across Europe which The Mother Church collected as part of its war relief operations.

On September 7th, 1919, McCrackan arrived in the holy land for educational and relief work. While there he had a major role in founding the Jerusalem News, the first English-language newspaper published in Palestine, and served as the paper's editor. He saw an "urgent need for a newspaper which could maintain a policy of impartiality among the conflicting races and religions of the Holy City." Historian Stuart E. Knee also credits McCrackan with bringing together Red Cross Commissioner John Huston Finley, the Grand Mufti of Jerusalem Kamil al-Husayni, and the Military Governor of Jerusalem Ronald Storrs during this period.

McCrackan was an critic of the slogan "a land without a people for a people without a land". He said, "We used to read in our papers the slogan of Zionism, 'to give back a people to a Land without a People,' while the truth was that Palestine was already well-peopled with a population which was rapidly increasing from natural causes." He called the ethnic nationalist Zionist movement a "false start of a true movement which will be a genuine restoration, a spiritual reunion."

He died suddenly in New York City on June 12, 1923, while visiting friends following his attendance of the Centennial celebration for his alma mater, Trinity College. His only brother John H. McCrackan was an Episcopal clergyman who had served as rector of the American Church in Munich, and died sometime before 1922. Two of McCrackan's books were published posthumously, an autobiography with a forward by his friend Henry van Dyke Jr., and a literary look at Eddy's Science and Health with Key to the Scriptures.

== Published work (partial list) ==
=== Articles ===
- "Our Foreign Policy" Arena magazine, (1893), pp 145–150
- "Andreas Hofer, The Hero of the Tirol" New England Magazine, (March 1896 - August 1896), pp 548–559
- "Emancipation" Christian Science Journal, (1919)

=== Books ===
- The Rise of the Swiss Republic (1892)
- Romance and Teutonic Switzerland (1894)
- Swiss Solutions of American Problems (1894)
- Little idyls of the big world (1895)
- The Huntington letters (1897)
- The Fair Land Tyrol (1905)
- Christian Science: Its discovery and development A.D. 1866 (1915)
- The Spell of the Italian Lakes (1918)
- The New Palestine (1922)
- An American abroad and at home, recollections of W. D. McCrackan (1924)
- Mary Baker Eddy and Her Book, Science and Health with Key to the Scriptures (1925)
