= Elizabeth Lippincott McQueen =

American aviation pioneer

- From left: Pancho Barnes, Elizabeth Lippincott McQueen, Amelia Earhart.
- Born: January 1, 1878; New Jersey
- Died: December 25, 1958 (aged 80); Hermosa Beach, California
- Known for: Founding the Jerusalem News and the Women's International Association of Aeronautics

Elizabeth Lippincott McQueen (January 1, 1878 – December 25, 1958) was the founder of the Jerusalem News, the first English-language newspaper in Jerusalem in 1919, and the Women's International Association of Aeronautics in 1929.

During World War I, McQueen, the wife of a wealthy manufacturer, served in war relief work in Palestine. McQueen returned to Palestine after the war where she and William Denison McCrackan founded the Jerusalem News, the first English-language newspaper in Jerusalem in 1919. After her interest in aviation was ignited, McQueen organized the Women's Aeronautic Association of California, which was soon merged with similar organizations internationally into the Women's International Association of Aeronautics (WIAA). The organization became the principal focus of McQueen's life. In addition to being the founding member, she was also the first vice-president of the WIAA. In 1929, McQueen conceived the idea of the Women's Air Derby an women's air race from Santa Monica, California to Cleveland, Ohio.

== Early life ==
Lippincott was born on New Year's Eve in 1878 in Salem County, New Jersey. Her parents were the Reverend Dr. Benjamin Crispin Lippincott, a Methodist minister and the first superintendent of public instruction in Washington Territory, and his second wife, Deborah Hand Diverty.

In 1900, Elizabeth married Ulysses Grant McQueen, a wealthy New York City inventor and manufacturer.

== Palestine ==
During World War I, McQueen left her home and served in war relief work in Palestine under Field Marshal Allenby. McQueen subscribed to the belief that the English were one of the 12 tribes of Israel and the British conquest of Palestine in 1917, and the later British Mandate, heralded the Second Coming.

McQueen returned to Palestine after the war on the Ryndam. She gave lectures to others on the ship.

In 1919, McQueen and William Denison McCrackan founded the Jerusalem News, the first English-language newspaper in Jerusalem. McCrackan died in 1923 and left most of his estate to McQueen.

== Aviation ==
In 1920, McQueen her interest in aviation was apparently ignited when she witnessed seven airplanes "take the place of two British regiments of soldiers" in routing a large number of rebel Arab cavalry in the desert near Aden.

In September 1928, she organized the Women's Aeronautic Association of California. Similar organizations were soon founded in New York, Arizona, New Mexico, Texas, Nevada, Oregon, Washington, Canada, England, France, Germany, Australia, and New Zealand. In May 1929, these various groups were merged into the Women's International Association of Aeronautics (WIAA), and this organization became the principal focus of her activities for the rest of her life. McQueen was the founding member and the first vice-president of the WIAA.

In 1929, McQueen and Lady Heath approached the Federation Aeronautique Internationale in Paris in order to have women's air records recognized. The federation agreed in early 1930. At the same time, in order to arouse greater interest in women's flying, McQueen conceived the idea and was one of the principal organizers of the first Women's Air Derby from Santa Monica, California, to the 1929 National Air Races in Cleveland. This event would become known as the "Powder Puff Derby".

== Personal life ==
In 1900, Elizabeth married Ulysses Grant McQueen. The couple lived in New York City until 1928, then moved to Beverly Hills, California. McQueen died in 1937 and Elizabeth married Dr. Irving Reed Bancroft, a prominent retired Los Angeles physician, about 1955.

Elizabeth also had two brothers: Dr. Jesse R. Diverty Lippincott, a physician and Reverend Benjamin Crispin Lippincott Jr.

== Death and legacy ==
McQueen died at her home in Hermosa Beach, California, on December 24, 1958, at the age of 80, after a long period of declining health. She was cremated and her ashes were buried at the Portal of Folded Wings Shrine to Aviation.

Her archive is at the University of Southern California, Doheny Memorial Library in the Rare Books & Manuscripts room.
