= Women's International Association of Aeronautics =

Was an association for female pilots and women interested in flying founded in 1929

The Women's International Association of Aeronautics (WIAA) was an association for female pilots and women interested in flying founded by Elizabeth Lippincott McQueen in 1929.

== History ==
=== Founding ===
In September 1928, Elizabeth Lippincott McQueen organized the Women's Aeronautic Association of California. Similar organisations were soon founded in New York, Arizona, New Mexico, Texas, Nevada, Oregon, Washington, Canada, England, France, Germany, Australia, and New Zealand.

In May 1929, these various groups were merged into the Women's International Association of Aeronautics. Prominent British aviator Lady Heath (1929-1932) became its first President, and Amelia Earhart, Ruth Nicols, and McQueen served as the organisation's first Vice Presidents. The organisation become the principal focus of McQueen's activities for the rest of her life.

The three objects of the group were to connect women around the world interested in aeronautics, to encourage interest in all forms of air traffic, and to promote universal friendship and service conducive to world peace.

=== Activities ===
A junior division of the WIAA, formed in 1931. Members under 7 years old were called "tailwinds", and those from 7 through 20 years old were called "zoomers".

In 1929, Mrs. McQueen and Lady Heath approached the Federation Aeronautique Internationale in Paris in order to have women's air records recognised. The federation agreed in early 1930.

At the same time, in order to arouse greater interest in women's flying, Mrs. McQueen conceived the idea for, and was one of the principal organisers of, the first Women's Air Derby from Santa Monica, California to the 1929 National Air Races in Cleveland. This event would become known as the "Powder Puff Derby".

== Presidents ==
- Elizabeth Lippincott McQueen, founder and "honorary president"
- Mary, Lady Heath, first inaugural president
- British reporter, Lady Grace Hay Drummond-Hay (1932-1940)
- educator, Dr. Mary Sinclair Crawford (1940-1947)
- actress Mary Pickford (1947-1949)
- airplane manufacturing executive Olive Ann Beech (1949-1954)
- pioneer aviator Matilde Moisant (1954-?).

== Famous members ==
- Amelia Earhart, one of the organisation's first Vice Presidents
- Anne Morrow Lindbergh, wife of Charles Lindbergh, was a member
- Margaret Perry, second woman to own an airport; officer of the association
- Doris Renninger-Brell, (Whirly-Girls #59), 1st female helicopter pilot in New York.
