= Appleton-Century-Crofts =

American book publisher

- Status: Defunct
- Founded: 1948
- Successor: Appleton & Lange (medical); Prentice Hall (textbooks); Hawthorn Books (trade)
- Country of origin: United States

Appleton-Century-Crofts, Inc. was a division of the Meredith Publishing Company. It was a result of the merger of Appleton-Century Company with F.S. Crofts Co. in 1948. Prior to that The Century Company had merged with D. Appleton & Company in 1933.

The Century Company and its subsequent incarnations published the New Century Dictionary.

Eventually Meredith sold the majority of the company and the Appleton name to Prentice-Hall in 1973. Part of the company became part of Hawthorn Books and New Win Publishing.

== Timeline ==
- 1948 Appleton-Century Company, founded in 1933, merged with F. S. Crofts Co., founded in 1924, to form Appleton-Century-Crofts.
- 1960 Purchased by Meredith Publishing Company
- 1969 Meredith trade books division sold to Hawthorn Books
- 1973 Appleton textbook division purchased by Prentice Hall; the medical division retains the Appleton name
- 1974 New Century division sold to Charles Walther, and was later renamed New Win Publishing
- 1998 Prentice Hall merged with Pearson Education
- 1999 Pearson Education sells successor company Appleton & Lange to McGraw-Hill
- 2003 Academic Learning Company, LLC acquired New Win Publishing, which was a division of New Century Publishing

== Imprints ==
- Century vagabond books of travel

== See also ==
- Duell, Sloan and Pearce
