= The Thin Man (film series) =

Series of detective films

- Created by: Dashiell Hammett
- Original work: The Thin Man (novel; 1934); The Thin Man (film; 1934)
- Years: 1934–1991

Print publications
- Novel(s): The Thin Man (1934)

Films and television
- Film(s): The Thin Man (1934); After the Thin Man (1936); Another Thin Man (1939); Shadow of the Thin Man (1941); The Thin Man Goes Home (1945); Song of the Thin Man (1947)
- Television series: The Thin Man (1957–1959)
- Television special(s): Nick and Nora (1975)

Theatrical presentations
- Musical(s): Nick & Nora (1991)

Audio
- Radio program(s): The Adventures of the Thin Man (1941–1950)

The Thin Man is a media franchise featuring detective characters Nick and Nora Charles based on the 1934 novel of the same name by Dashiell Hammett. The franchise includes six theatrical films, one radio series, and one television series. Additionally, it has been reimagined for the stage through a musical and various plays.

== Films ==
Film	Release date	Director(s)	Screenwriter(s)	Story by	Producer(s)
The Thin Man	May 25, 1934	W. S. Van Dyke	Albert Hackett and Frances Goodrich	Based on: The Thin Man by Dashiell Hammett	Hunt Stromberg
After the Thin Man	December 25, 1936	W. S. Van Dyke	Albert Hackett and Frances Goodrich		Hunt Stromberg
Another Thin Man	November 17, 1939	W. S. Van Dyke	Albert Hackett and Frances Goodrich	Based on: "The Farewell Murder" by Dashiell Hammett	Hunt Stromberg
Shadow of the Thin Man	November 21, 1941	W. S. Van Dyke	Harry Kurnitz and Irving Brecher	Harry Kurnitz	Hunt Stromberg
The Thin Man Goes Home	November 21, 1944	Richard Thorpe	Robert Riskin and Dwight Taylor	Robert Riskin and Harry Kurnitz	Everett Riskin
Song of the Thin Man	August 28, 1947	Edward Buzzell	Steve Fisher and Nat Perrin	Stanley Roberts	Nat Perrin

=== Future ===
In October 2010, it was announced that Johnny Depp was developing a new adaptation of The Thin Man for Warner Bros. through his Infinitum Nihil production company. Rob Marshall was negotiating to direct when screenwriter Jerry Stahl joined the project in March 2011. However, David Koepp came on board to write the script that August.

After creative differences between Koepp and Marshall, Billy Ray was tapped to write the screenplay. But Warner Bros. never green-lit the film, and it was eventually shelved as Marshall entered production on Into the Woods (2014).

In October 2023, LuckyChap Entertainment and Plan B Entertainment were in talks to co-produce a remake of The Thin Man.

== Television ==
=== The Thin Man (1957–1959) ===
In 1957, MGM Television produced a television adaptation of The Thin Man starring Peter Lawford and Phyllis Kirk as Nick and Nora Charles. The series ran for two seasons on NBC.

=== Nick and Nora (1975) ===
Nick and Nora is a made-for-television movie that aired on ABC as a part of the network's Wide World of Mystery programming block. The MGM Television-produced special starred Craig Stevens and Jo Ann Pflug in the lead roles.

== Cast and crew ==
=== Principal cast ===
List indicator

This section includes characters who have appeared in the franchise.

- An empty grey cell indicates the character was not in the film or series.

Character	Films						TV series
Character	The Thin Man	After the Thin Man	Another Thin Man	Shadow of the Thin Man	The Thin Man Goes Home	Song of the Thin Man	The Thin Man
Character	1934	1936	1939	1941	1945	1947	1957–1959
Nick Charles	William Powell	William Powell	William Powell	William Powell	William Powell	William Powell	Peter Lawford
Nora Charles	Myrna Loy	Myrna Loy	Myrna Loy	Myrna Loy	Myrna Loy	Myrna Loy	Phyllis Kirk
Dorothy Wynant	Maureen O'Sullivan						
Lt. John Guild	Nat Pendleton		Nat Pendleton				
Mimi Wynant Jorgenson	Minna Gombell						
Lieutenant Abrams		Sam Levene		Sam Levene			
David Graham		James Stewart					
Selma Landis		Elissa Landi					
"Dancer"		Joseph Calleia					
Aunt Katherine Forrest		Jessie Ralph					
Lois MacFay			Virginia Grey				
Assistant District Attorney Van Slack			Otto Kruger				
Colonel Burr MacFay			C. Aubrey Smith				
Dorothy Walters			Ruth Hussey				
Paul Clarke				Barry Nelson			
Stella				Louise Beavers			
Molly				Donna Reed			
Mrs. Charles					Lucile Watson		
Laurabelle "Laura" Ronson					Gloria DeHaven		
Crazy Mary					Anne Revere		
Clarence "Clinker" Krause						Keenan Wynn	
Nick "Nickie" Charles Jr.			William A. Poulsen	Richard Hall		Dean Stockwell	

=== Additional crew ===
Role	The Thin Man	After the Thin Man	Another Thin Man	Shadow of the Thin Man	The Thin Man Goes Home	Song of the Thin Man
Role	1934	1936	1939	1941	1945	1947
Composer	William Axt	Herbert Stothart and Edward Ward	Edward Ward	David Snell	David Snell	David Snell
Editor	Robert J. Kern	Robert J. Kern	Fredrick Y. Smith	Robert J. Kern	Ralph E. Winters	Gene Ruggiero
Cinematographer	James Wong Howe	Oliver T. Marsh	William H. Daniels and Oliver T. Marsh	William H. Daniels	Karl Freund	Charles Rosher
Art director	Cedric Gibbons	Cedric Gibbons	Cedric Gibbons	Cedric Gibbons	Edward Carfagno and Cedric Gibbons	Randall Duell and Cedric Gibbons
Production companies	Metro-Goldwyn-Mayer	Metro-Goldwyn-Mayer	Metro-Goldwyn-Mayer	Metro-Goldwyn-Mayer	Metro-Goldwyn-Mayer	Metro-Goldwyn-Mayer
Distributor	Loew's Inc.	Loew's Inc.	Loew's Inc.	Loew's Inc.	Loew's Inc.	Loew's Inc.

== Reception ==
=== Box office performance ===
Film	U.S. release date	Budget	Box office gross			Ref.
Film	U.S. release date	Budget	U.S. and Canada	International	Worldwide	Ref.
The Thin Man	May 25, 1934	$231,000	$818,000	$729,000	$1,423,000	
After the Thin Man	December 25, 1936	$673,000	$1,992,000	$1,173,000	$3,165,000	
Another Thin Man	November 17, 1939	$1,107,000	$1,523,000	$700,000	$2,223,000	
Shadow of the Thin Man	November 21, 1941	$821,000	$1,453,000	$848,000	$2,301,000	
The Thin Man Goes Home	January 25, 1945	$1,401,000	$1,770,000	$1,044,000	$2,814,000	
Song of the Thin Man	August 28, 1947	$1,670,000	$1,403,000	$902,000	$2,305,000	
Total		$5,903,000	$8,959,000	$5,396,000	$14,231,000	

=== Critical response ===
Film	Rotten Tomatoes	Metacritic
The Thin Man	98% (46 reviews)	86 (16 critics)
After the Thin Man	100% (25 reviews)	
Another Thin Man	86% (22 reviews)	63 (8 critics)
Shadow of the Thin Man	89% (9 reviews)	63 (7 critics)
The Thin Man Goes Home	75% (8 reviews)	
Song of the Thin Man	91% (11 reviews)	
