= William Powell and Myrna Loy =

1930's and 40's acting duo

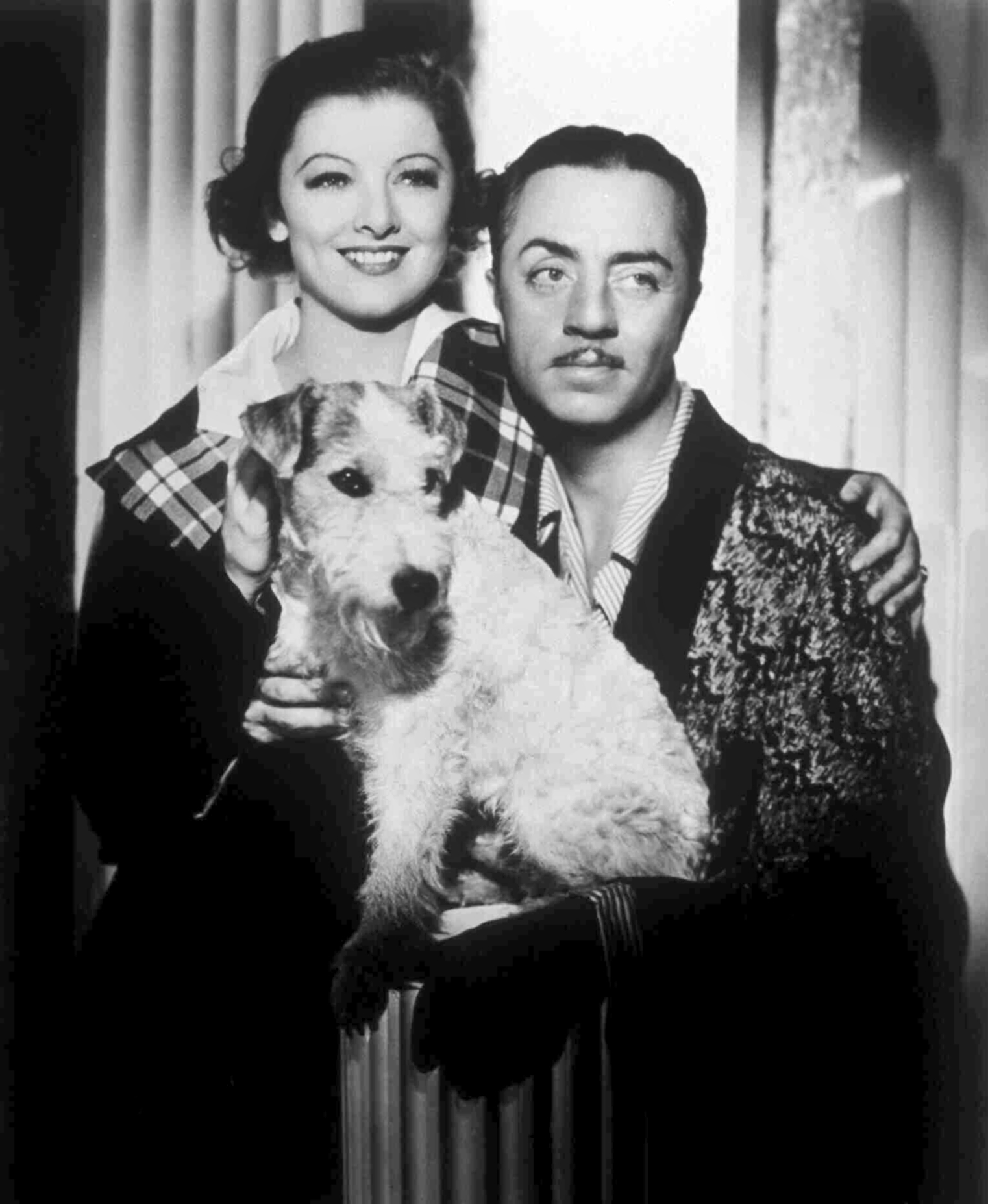
Loy and Powell (and the dog Skippy) in a promotional photo for The Thin Man.

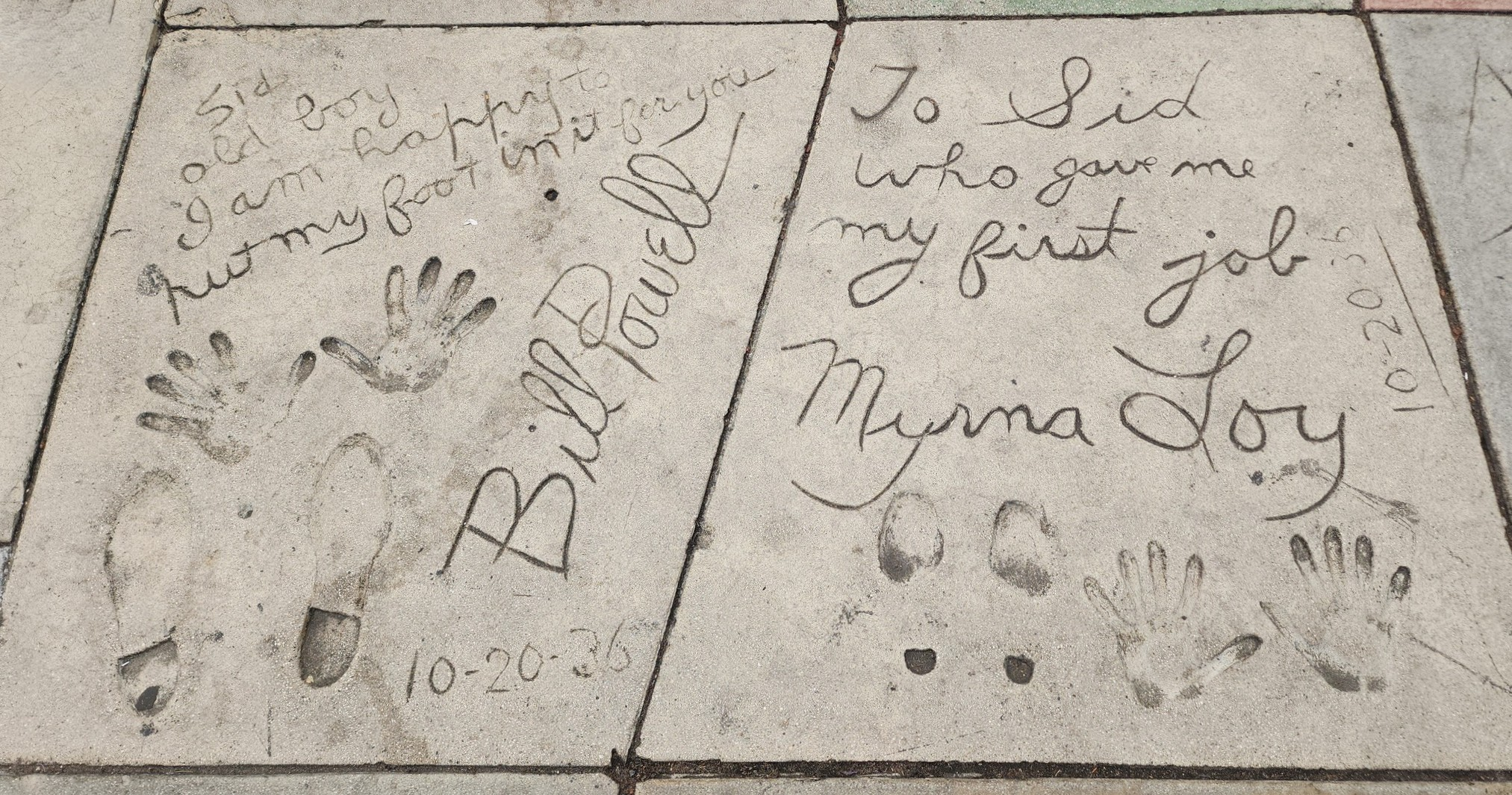
Myrna Loy & William Powell Cement Imprint in front of Grauman's Chinese Theater.

William Powell (1892–1984) and Myrna Loy (1905–1993) starred in 13 movies together in the 1930s and '40s. Loy also had an uncredited cameo in their 14th and last film together, The Senator Was Indiscreet, which starred Powell.

Their frequent pairing—always playing a couple—and on-screen chemistry, especially in their six popular Thin Man films, where they played husband and wife Nick and Nora Charles, led many fans to believe they were married in real life. However, they were only good friends. In a 1988 interview, Loy explained, "I think we were too much alike for a romance."

Powell was already a well-established leading man in Hollywood prior to their teaming, dating back to the silent era, but it was the great success of The Thin Man that made Loy a star. She almost did not get the role. Louis B. Mayer had already cast her in Stamboul Quest, and only agreed to let her play Nora Charles if the picture could be shot in three weeks. Director W. S. "One Take Woody" Van Dyke only needed 16 days for shooting and two for retakes. A B movie, The Thin Man was a box office and critical hit.

== Filmography ==
Year	Title	Powell's role	Loy's role	Director	Ref
1934	Manhattan Melodrama	Jim Wade	Eleanor Packer	W. S. Van Dyke	
1934	The Thin Man	Nick Charles	Nora Charles	W. S. Van Dyke	
1934	Evelyn Prentice	John Prentice	Evelyn Prentice	William K. Howard	
1936	The Great Ziegfeld	Florenz Ziegfeld, Jr.	Billie Burke	Robert Z. Leonard	
1936	Libeled Lady	Bill Chandler	Connie Allenbury	Jack Conway	
1936	After the Thin Man	Nick Charles	Nora Charles	W. S. Van Dyke	
1937	Double Wedding	Charlie Lodne	Margit Agnew	Richard Thorpe	
1939	Another Thin Man	Nick Charles	Nora Charles	W. S. Van Dyke	
1940	I Love You Again	Larry Wilson/George Carey	Kay Wilson	W. S. Van Dyke	
1941	Love Crazy	Steve Ireland	Susan Ireland	Jack Conway	
1941	Shadow of the Thin Man	Nick Charles	Nora Charles	W. S. Van Dyke	
1944	The Thin Man Goes Home	Nick Charles	Nora Charles	Richard Thorpe	
1947	Song of the Thin Man	Nick Charles	Nora Charles	Edward Buzzell	
1947	The Senator Was Indiscreet	Senator Melvin G. Ashton	Mrs. Melvin G. Ashton (cameo)	George S. Kaufman	
