= The Thin Man =

1934 detective novel by Dashiell Hammett

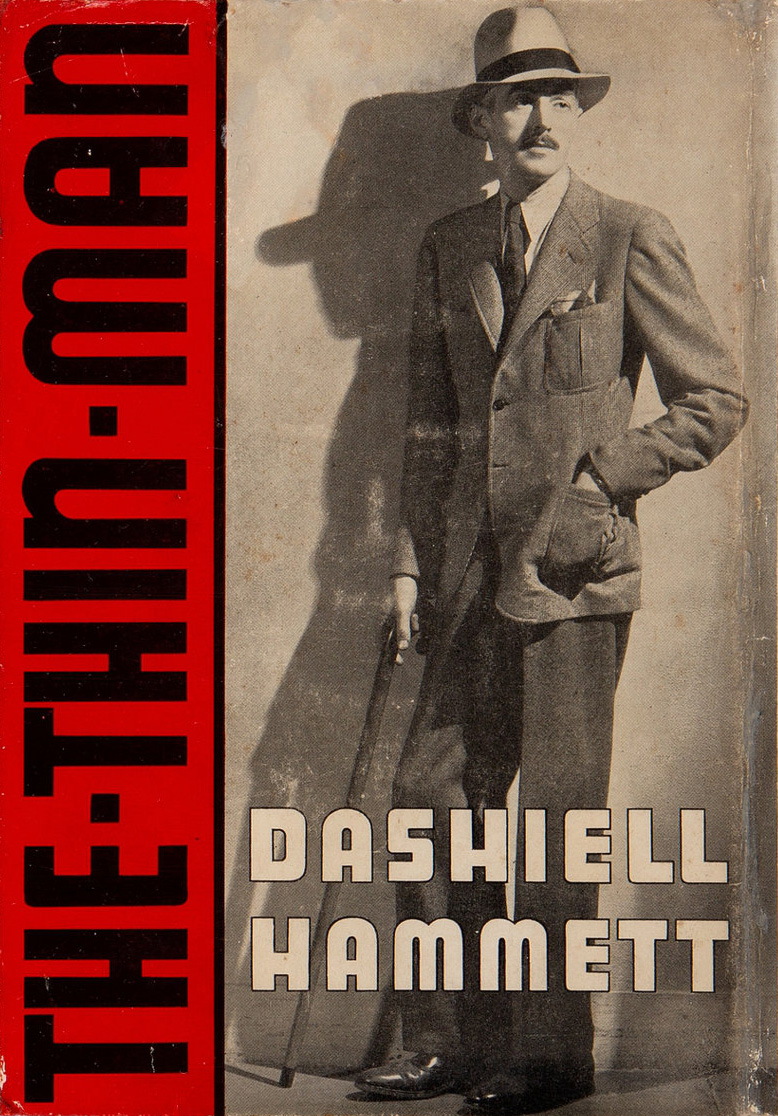
- Cover of the first edition
- Author: Dashiell Hammett
- Language: English
- Genre: Detective; Murder mystery
- Set in: New York City, December 1932
- Published: 1934 (Alfred A. Knopf)
- Publication place: United States
- Media type: Print (hardcover)
- Pages: 259
- Dewey Decimal: 813.52
- LC Class: PS3515 .A4347 .T47
- Preceded by: The Glass Key
- Website: The Thin Man at Penguin Random House

The Thin Man is a 1934 detective novel by Dashiell Hammett, originally published in a condensed version in the December 1933 issue of Redbook. It appeared in book form the following month. A film series followed, featuring the main characters Nick and Nora Charles, and Hammett was hired to provide scripts for the first two.

== Plot ==
The story is set in New York City during the Christmas season of 1932, in the last days of Prohibition in the United States. The main characters are Nick Charles, a former private detective, and Nora, his socialite wife. Nick, the son of a Greek immigrant, now spends most of his time in San Francisco managing his late father-in-law's businesses in between heavy drinking sessions. While in a New York speakeasy, Charles meets Dorothy, the now grown-up daughter of a former client, Clyde Wynant, who says she is trying to contact the father she has not seen since her parents' divorce.

Two days later, Nick sees a newspaper report of the shooting of Wynant's secretary (and one-time mistress), Julia Wolf. The body was discovered by Wynant's former wife Mimi, now married to the younger Christian Jorgenson, a gigolo close to deserting her after they have run through her substantial divorce settlement. The murder case is being led by Lieutenant John Guild, who suspects Julia's murderer was her new lover, the gangster Shep Morelli. That night Morelli breaks into Nick's hotel suite to insist that he was not the killer; however, he is spotted by the police, who now break in. Nick has time to knock Nora out of the way and distract Morelli enough so that he is only slightly wounded before the crook is arrested.

Guild recognises Nick from a decade before, when Guild was a rookie and Nick a respected member of a Manhattan detective agency. Guild would like Nick to help with his investigations, especially in helping locate Wynant, who is supposedly developing a new invention in a secret location. Though Nick is reluctant, he is further drawn into the affair by his former army buddy Herbert Macaulay, who is Wynant's attorney and says he has orders to get money to him via the inventor's secretary. Nick learns more about Julia Wolf while drinking at a low-life speakeasy called the Pigiron. Its proprietor, a safe-cracker named Studsy Burke arrested by Nick years before, tells him that Julia had been seen drinking there with a former burglar, Arthur Nunheim.

Nick and Lieutenant Guild go to question Nunheim but he manages to get away down a fire escape and is later found shot with the same gun used to kill Julia. A new suspect emerges when it is discovered that Christian Jorgenson's real identity is Victor Rosewater, Wynant's former associate, who had quarrelled with him and sworn to get even. It later emerges also that his marriage to Mimi was bigamous, as his first wife Georgia is still alive and living in Boston. Mimi has only recently arrived from abroad, intent on getting more money from Wynant. Now her son Gilbert produces a letter from him and later she informs Nick that Wynant had called at her apartment, bringing deeds and a check to pay her expenses.

Nick suggests to Lieutenant Guild that there might be more clues at the lab Wynant had closed up before leaving three months before. The police search the lab again and find a body under a newly cemented floor. It has been buried in quicklime, but the accompanying clothes of a fat man are largely untouched, as are a walking-stick and initialled belt buckle. Nick deduces that they were left to make people believe that the body was not that of the fit but very thin Wynant. Nick confronts Mimi and makes her realise that Macaulay has been swindling Wynant, fobbing her off with only part of his money when she can now claim it all. Macaulay was the murderer of Wynant, of his accomplice Julia, and of Nunheim. When the greedy woman turns on Macaulay, Nick knocks him out before he can draw a gun and turns him over to Guild.

== Characters ==
- Nick Charles (Charalambides): the narrator, a former private detective
- Nora Charles: Nick's rich and clever wife
- Clyde Wynant, the titular Thin Man: an eccentric inventor
- Mimi Jorgenson: Clyde's ex-wife
- Julia Wolf: Wynant's secretary and rumored mistress
- Dorothy 'Dorry' Wynant: Mimi and Clyde's daughter
- Gilbert 'Gil' Wynant: Dorothy's younger brother
- Christian Jorgenson, Mimi's new husband
- Herbert Macaulay: Wynant's attorney
- Harrison Quinn: a stockbroker and Nick's friend
- Alice Quinn: Harrison's wife
- 'Shep' Morelli: a gangster and childhood friend of Julia
- 'Studsy' Burke: a former safe-cracker turned speakeasy proprietor
- Arthur Nunheim: police informer and former convict
- John Guild: a homicide detective

== A change in direction ==
The germ of the novel was a 1930 draft, set in San Francisco and featuring a private detective named John Guild on the trail of the missing scientist Walter Irving Wynant who may have murdered his secretary. Three years later Hammett abandoned the hardboiled style of his draft in favour of a comedy of manners, basing his story in New York and with a wealthy amateur as lead.

However, the change in direction seemingly promised by Hammett's new lightness of touch did not prevent W. H. Auden from reading into it a more challenging subtext. The poet took up the novel's opening sentence ("I was leaning against the bar in a speakeasy on Fifty-second Street") at the start of his own "September 1, 1939": "I sit in one of the dives/ On Fifty-second Street…As the clever hopes expire/ Of a low dishonest decade". The low dishonest years of American Prohibition had delivered a hard-drinking climate in which dishonesty, double-dealing and hypocrisy were the social norm, providing the prevailing theme of distrust and disregard for values among most of the characters involved in Hammett's novel. For Auden, writing on the eve of World War II, the results of political gangsterism - whether in Europe or America - looked much the same.

Although this change of direction was a success with the public, Hammett never followed it up. Lillian Hellman, the fellow political activist to whom The Thin Man was dedicated, later speculated on the reasons for this:

I have been asked many times over the years why he did not write another novel after The Thin Man. I do not know. I think, but I only think, I know a few of the reasons: he wanted to do a new kind of work; he was sick for many of those years and getting sicker. But he kept his work, and his plans for work, in angry privacy and even I would not have been answered if I had ever asked.

== Film series ==
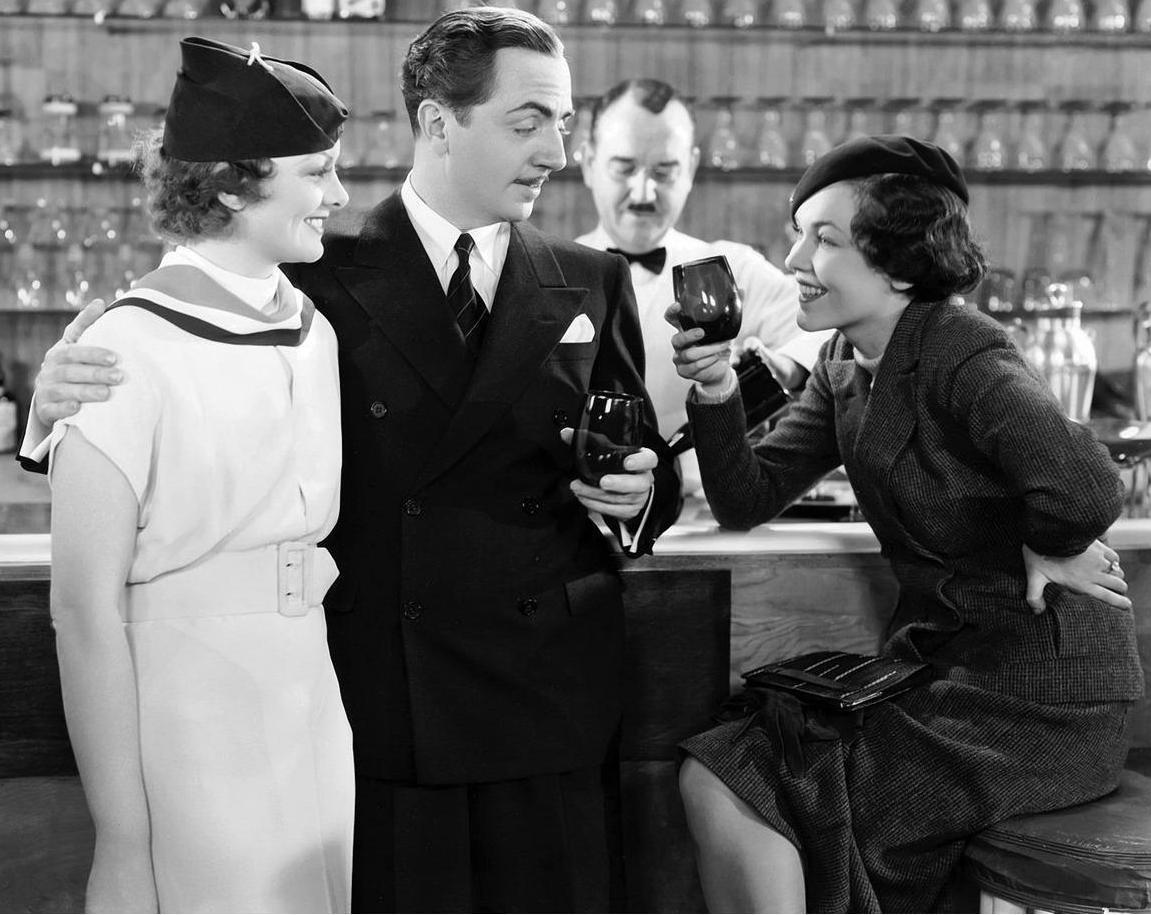
Scene from the film version: (left to right) Nora (Myrna Loy), Nick (William Powell) and Dorothy (Maureen O'Sullivan).

Even as the novel was appearing at the start of 1934, MGM paid Hammett $21,000 (£13,100) for the movie rights. Shot in just 14 days and fairly faithful to the original, the film was released within five months of the novel's successful first appearance. Though Hammett never completed a new novel himself, the success of its adaptation formed the basis for what became a linked six-film series, as well as for The Thin Man television series aired on NBC from 1957–59.

Following the success of the 1934 film version of The Thin Man, Hammett was commissioned to work on screenplays for two of the sequels, After the Thin Man (1936) and Another Thin Man (1939). These scripts, discovered amongst Hammett's papers in 2011, together with instructions by Hammett for incorporation of additional elements written by screenwriters Albert Hackett and Frances Goodrich, were edited by Hammett's biographer Richard Layman in collaboration with Hammett's granddaughter Julie M. Rivett and published as novellas under the title Return of the Thin Man in 2012.
