= Shadow of the Thin Man =

1941 film by W. S. Van Dyke

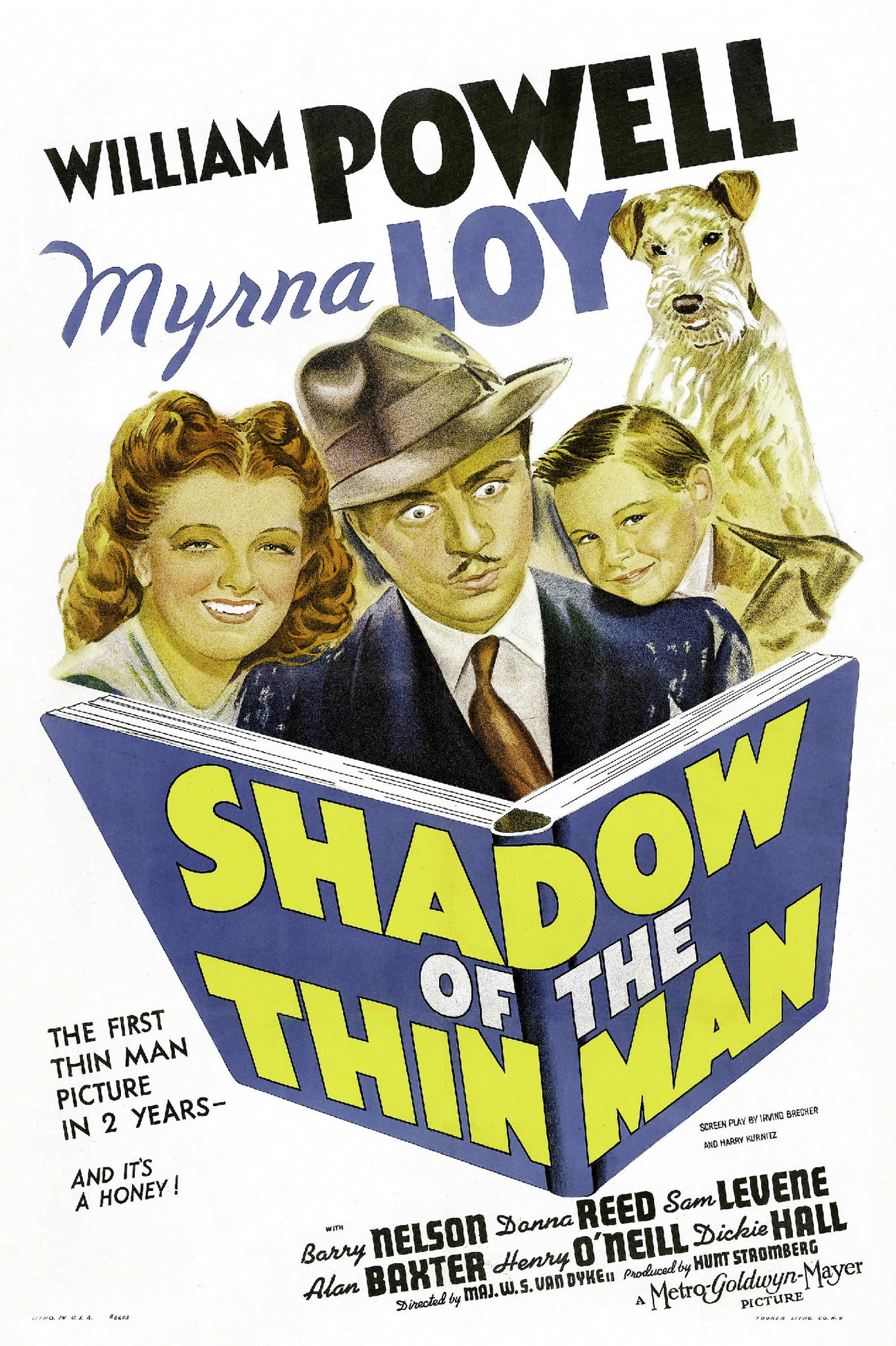
- Theatrical release poster
- Directed by: W. S. Van Dyke
- Screenplay by: Irving Brecher; Harry Kurnitz
- Story by: Harry Kurnitz
- Based on: Characters by Dashiell Hammett
- Produced by: Hunt Stromberg
- Starring: William Powell; Myrna Loy; Barry Nelson; Donna Reed; Sam Levene; Alan Baxter; Henry O'Neill; Dickie Hall
- Cinematography: William Daniels
- Edited by: Robert J. Kern
- Music by: David Snell
- Production company: Metro-Goldwyn-Mayer
- Distributed by: Loew's Inc.
- Release date: November 21, 1941
- Running time: 97 minutes
- Country: United States
- Language: English
- Budget: $821,000
- Box office: $2,301,000

Shadow of the Thin Man is a 1941 American comedy mystery film directed by W. S. Van Dyke and starring William Powell and Myrna Loy as Nick and Nora Charles. It was produced by Metro-Goldwyn-Mayer as the fourth installment in the Thin Man film series. The cast also features Barry Nelson, Donna Reed, Sam Levene (reprising his role from 1936's After the Thin Man), Alan Baxter, Henry O'Neill, and Dickie Hall. This was one of three films in which Stella Adler appeared.

== Plot ==
In San Francisco, Nick and Nora Charles are looking forward to a relaxing afternoon at a horse racetrack, but they learn from Nick's old friend, Lieutenant Abrams, that a jockey named Goldez has been found shot dead in a shower stall after throwing a race the previous day. That night, Major Jason I. Sculley, the special deputy for the state legislature, and investigative reporter Paul Clarke visit the Charleses, seeking Nick's help with the case; he refuses but accepts Paul's tickets to the evening's wrestling match. At the arena, reporter "Whitey" Barrow, a rival of Paul, forces Claire Porter, the girlfriend of arena owner and suspected racketeer "Link" Stephens, to give him her diamond bracelet to settle a $5,000 debt.

While Nick and Nora watch the match, Whitey goes to Stephens' office upstairs and demands $10,000 for keeping Stephens' name "clean" in the newspapers. After Whitey leaves, bookmaker "Rainbow" Benny Loomis angrily tells Stephens and his partner Fred Macy that Whitey owes him $8,000. In a restaurant, Paul meets with his fiancée Molly Ford, who has been assisting in his investigation by working undercover as Stephens' secretary. Paul takes Molly's office key and searches Stephens' office. As Paul leaves with Stephens' ledger, a gun-wielding Whitey arrives, demanding the ledger. In the ensuing struggle, Whitey knocks Paul out and takes the ledger. An unseen assailant then shoots Whitey dead, just as a night watchman sees Benny running down the stairs.

After the match, Abrams informs Nick and Nora of the murder. In Stephens' office, the police question Paul. Stephens and Macy both have alibis. Nora happens upon a laundry list, which Nick determines to be a coded record of the night's illegal bets. Nevertheless, Abrams has Paul and Molly arrested. At the racetrack, Nick finds a gun in the shower drain. The next day, Nick theorizes with Abrams that Goldez had been contemplating suicide before changing his mind, but as he tried to hide the gun in the drain, it accidentally went off and killed him. Nick tells the press that Goldez and Whitey were killed by the same person and that Paul is innocent. Nick then tells Abrams that he hopes his false report will push Whitey's murderer to frame someone for both deaths.

A ticket seller at the wrestling arena informs Nick that Macy's alibi is fake and that he witnessed Claire and Whitey arguing the night of his murder. Nick visits Claire, who reacts angrily to Nick's questions and orders him to leave. Nick then investigates Whitey's apartment, where Asta helps him find Claire's diamond bracelet. Claire enters the apartment and admits that she was having an affair with Whitey, and that she gave him the bracelet because he owed Benny $8,000 in gambling debts.

That night, Nick and Nora meet Paul and Molly at a seafood restaurant. Nick encounters Benny and tells him that the watchman saw him the night of Whitey's murder. Terrified and wearing a bulletproof vest, Benny flees the restaurant. Abrams arrives and tells Nick and Paul that Whitey had been blackmailing Claire, threatening to expose her criminal past to Stephens. Sculley takes Nick, Paul, and Abrams to Benny's apartment, where they find him hanging, as well as the partially burned ledger. Nick remarks that the rough lacerations on Benny's neck rule out a suicide, and that his bulletproof vest had been removed.

The next day, Nick gathers all the suspects in Abrams' office. Nick eventually declares Sculley to be the murderer. Since Whitey knew of Sculley's partnership with Stephens and Macy, Sculley killed Whitey. He then killed Benny and tried to frame him for the deaths of Goldez and Whitey. According to the superintendent of Benny's building, Benny, fearing for his own life, had switched apartments three hours before he died. Sculley claims he had not visited Benny in a week, yet he led Nick, Paul, and Abrams to the correct apartment the previous night. Sculley grabs Nick's gun, but Nora jumps Sculley while others help restrain him. Nick reveals he had earlier emptied his gun and gives Nora a diamond bracelet.

== Cast ==
- William Powell as Nick Charles
- Myrna Loy as Nora Charles
- Barry Nelson as Paul Clarke
- Donna Reed as Molly
- Sam Levene as Lieutenant Abrams
- Alan Baxter as "Whitey" Barrow
- Henry O'Neill as Major Jason I. Sculley
- Dickie Hall as Nick Jr.
- Stella Adler as Claire Porter
- Loring Smith as "Link" Stephens
- Joseph Anthony as Fred Macy
- Lou Lubin as "Rainbow" Benny
- Louise Beavers as Stella
- Skippy as Asta
- Will Wright as Maguire, nervous ticket seller (uncredited)
- Sid Melton as "Fingers" (uncredited)
- Adeline De Walt Reynolds as Barrow's landlady (uncredited)
- Tor Johnson as Jack the Ripper, wrestler (uncredited)
- Frankie Burke as Jockey at the races (uncredited)
- Joe Oakie as Spider Webb (uncredited)
- Brick Sullivan as Riley (uncredited)

== Production ==
Frances Goodrich and Albert Hackett, the husband and wife team who wrote the first three Thin Man scripts, refused to write another one. Goodrich said: "They press you awfully hard there…when they started talking about another Thin Man, we started throwing up and crying into our typewriters. We had the nervous breakdown together, [so] we said, "let's get out of here [and] we quit".

The film was based on a story by Harry Kurnitz, not Dashiell Hammett, as the previous films had been, with the script written by Harry Kurnitz and Irving Brecher.

After difficulties with the previous films, author Dashiell Hammett was uninvolved in the production of Shadow or the two subsequent films in the series.

On 22 June 1941, MGM filmed exteriors for Shadow of the Thin Man in Berkeley, California, with Golden Gate Fields racetrack, which first opened on 1 February the same year, as Greenway Park. On the San Francisco–Oakland Bay Bridge, Nick and Nora Charles get "pulled over" for speeding on the upper deck of the bridge.

== Box office ==
Shadow of the Thin Man was eagerly welcomed, coming two years after the previous outing and hitting theaters just two weeks before the attack on Pearl Harbor. It would be three years before Loy would make another film (The Thin Man Goes Home in 1945) as she left Hollywood for New York, where she volunteered for the war effort with the Red Cross, as an assistant to the director of military and naval welfare.

According to MGM records, the film earned $1,453,000 in the US and Canada and $848,000 elsewhere, resulting in a profit of $769,000.

== Nick and Nora Charles film series ==
This film was the fourth of six based on the characters of Nick and Nora Charles:

- The Thin Man (1934)
- After the Thin Man (1936)
- Another Thin Man (1939)
- Shadow of the Thin Man (1941)
- The Thin Man Goes Home (1944)
- Song of the Thin Man (1947)
