= Song of the Thin Man =

1947 film by Edward Buzzell

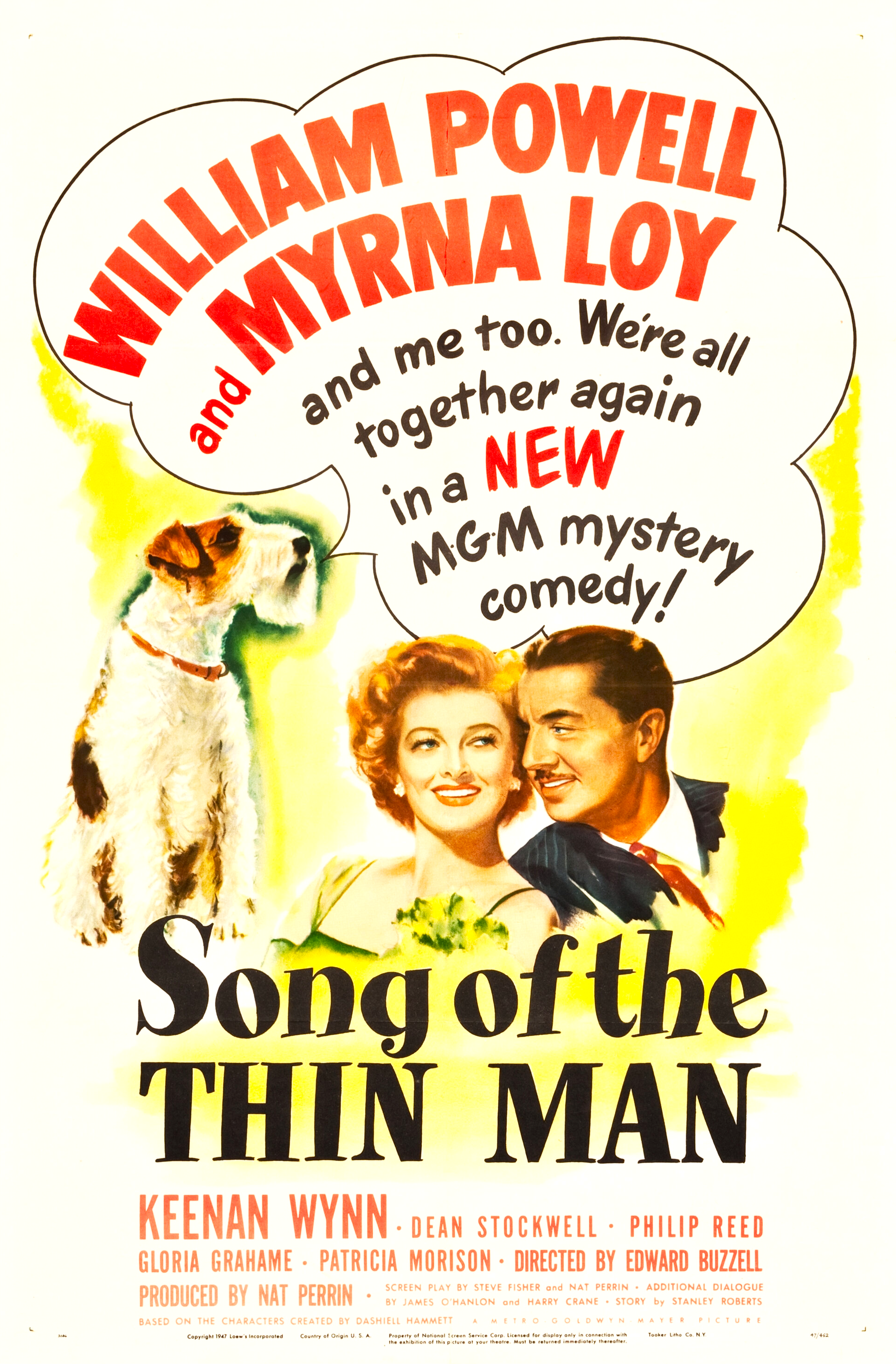
- Theatrical release poster
- Directed by: Edward Buzzell
- Screenplay by: Steve Fisher; Nat Perrin; James O'Hanlon (Note: Additional dialogue); Harry Crane
- Story by: Stanley Roberts
- Based on: Characters by Dashiell Hammett
- Produced by: Nat Perrin
- Starring: William Powell; Myrna Loy; Keenan Wynn; Dean Stockwell; Philip Reed; Gloria Grahame; Patricia Morison
- Cinematography: Charles Rosher
- Edited by: Gene Ruggiero
- Music by: David Snell
- Production company: Metro-Goldwyn-Mayer
- Distributed by: Loew's, Inc.
- Release date: August 28, 1947
- Running time: 86 minutes
- Country: United States
- Language: English
- Budget: $1,670,000
- Box office: $2,305,000

Song of the Thin Man is a 1947 American comedy mystery film directed by Edward Buzzell. It is the sixth and final installment in MGM's The Thin Man film series starring William Powell and Myrna Loy as Nick and Nora Charles, characters created by Dashiell Hammett. The supporting cast includes Keenan Wynn, Dean Stockwell, Phillip Reed, Gloria Grahame, and Patricia Morison.

== Plot ==
Nick and Nora Charles are attending a charity ball sponsored by David I. Thayar and staged aboard the S.S. Fortune, Phil Orval Brant's gambling ship. The entertainment is provided by a jazz band consisting of bandleader Tommy Drake, sultry singer Fran Page, and talented but unstable clarinetist Buddy Hollis.

After a set, Drake informs a displeased Phil that he is quitting the band, as Mitchell Talbin has booked a tour of dance halls for him. However, Drake owes gangster Al Amboy $12,000. When Amboy—who is at the party—hears the news, he demands full payment that night. Drake begs Talbin to give him an advance, but Talbin is unwilling to part with such a large sum. In desperation, Drake sneaks into Phil's office and opens the safe, when he is shot from behind and killed by an unseen assailant.

Phil and socialite Janet Thayar elope, as her father David disapproves of Phil's lower-class background. The next morning, they visit Nick and Nora's apartment, having learned that Phil is the prime suspect in the murder. Phil and Janet ask Nick to help them clear their names, but Nick worries that he and Nora may be implicated. As Nick sees Phil and Janet out, a bullet nearly strikes Phil. Nick turns Phil over to the police, convinced that he will be safer in police custody. Nick then starts investigating.

Sneaking aboard the Fortune, Nick discovers on the back of a sheet of music a receipt signed by Amboy acknowledging that Drake's debt had been paid. Nick then runs into the remaining members of Drake's band, allowed back on board to collect their instruments. When he questions them, he learns that Drake had many enemies, among them Buddy. Musician Clarence "Clinker" Krause agrees to help Nick locate Buddy, but they have no luck.

After Nick concludes that the bullet that killed Drake was fired from an antique gun, he and Nora visit Janet and her father David, an avid collector of antiques. Nick finds that one gun is missing from David's collection, and David tells Nick that Phil had the missing gun the night of the murder. Janet accuses David of lying, and after receiving a mysterious telephone call, she leaves in a hurry. Nick and Nora follow Janet to Fran's apartment where they find Fran's body, recently stabbed in the back. Janet claims Fran called to sell her some information that would help her prove Phil's innocence, but that she arrived after Fran was killed.

A matchbook found in Fran's apartment leads Nick and Nora to a sanatorium in Poughkeepsie, where Buddy is undergoing treatment. Buddy is too badly shaken to answer Nick's questions, though Nora's presence seems to calm him down. When Nora sneaks back later by herself, Buddy becomes agitated, confesses to the murder, pulls out the antique gun, and tries to shoot Nora but misses. Nick does not believe the deranged man's confession as Drake was slain by a well-aimed shot, and deduces that the real culprit planted the murder weapon on Buddy and that Fran was murdered because she knew who killed Drake.

To lure out the killer, Nick gathers all the suspects by throwing a party on the reopened Fortune. Nora notices that Amboy's wife is wearing a valuable necklace that matches the earrings owned by Talbin's wife, Phyllis. Soon afterward, the necklace mysteriously reappears on Phyllis' neck. When Nick confronts Talbin, Phyllis admits that it was she who paid off her lover Drake's debt using the necklace. As Nick asks a fully recovered Buddy to reveal the killer's identity, Talbin confesses to killing Drake because of his affair with Phyllis, and also confesses to killing Fran to cover up his crime. In desperation, Talbin pulls out a gun, but Phyllis shoots him first and kills him as revenge for Drake's murder.

== Cast ==
- William Powell as Nick Charles
- Myrna Loy as Nora Charles
- Keenan Wynn as Clarence "Clinker" Krause
- Dean Stockwell as Nick Charles Jr.
- Phillip Reed (credited as Philip Reed) as Tommy Edlon Drake
- Patricia Morison as Phyllis Talbin
- Leon Ames as Mitchell Talbin
- Gloria Grahame as Fran Ledue Page (singing voice was dubbed by Carol Arden)
- Jayne Meadows as Janet Thayar
- Ralph Morgan as David I. Thayar
- Bess Flowers as Jessica Thayar
- Don Taylor as Buddy Hollis
- Warner Anderson as Dr. Monolaw
- Bruce Cowling as Phil Orval Brant
- Connie Gilchrist as Bertha, the Charles' housekeeper
- Henry Nemo as The Neem
- William Bishop as Al Amboy
- Marie Windsor as Helen Amboy
- James Burke as Captain Callahan (uncredited)

== Production ==
This Thin Man film differs in several respects from the others in the series and was one of two films in the series not directed by W. S. Van Dyke, who died in 1943. The script was one of three not written by the husband and wife team of Albert Hackett and Frances Goodrich, who had worked with Dashiell Hammett to develop the Nick and Nora characters earlier in the series.

It was the last film of Myrna Loy with MGM.

== Reception ==
According to MGM records, the film earned $1,403,000 in the US and Canada and $902,000 elsewhere, resulting in a loss of $128,000.

The film was the last of six based on the characters of Nick and Nora Charles:

- The Thin Man (1934)
- After the Thin Man (1936)
- Another Thin Man (1939)
- Shadow of the Thin Man (1941)
- The Thin Man Goes Home (1944)
- Song of the Thin Man (1947)
