= The Thin Man (film) =

1934 film by W. S. Van Dyke

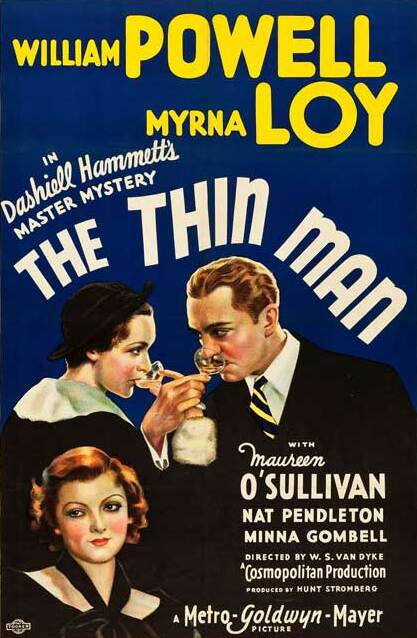
- Theatrical release poster
- Directed by: W. S. Van Dyke
- Screenplay by: Albert Hackett; Frances Goodrich
- Based on: The Thin Man; 1933 novel by Dashiell Hammett
- Produced by: Hunt Stromberg
- Starring: William Powell; Myrna Loy; Maureen O'Sullivan; Nat Pendleton; Minna Gombell
- Cinematography: James Wong Howe
- Edited by: Robert J. Kern
- Music by: William Axt
- Production companies: Cosmopolitan Productions; Metro-Goldwyn-Mayer
- Distributed by: Loew's Inc.
- Release date: May 25, 1934 (US)
- Running time: 91 minutes
- Country: United States
- Language: English
- Budget: $231,000
- Box office: $1.4 million (worldwide rentals)

The Thin Man is a 1934 American pre-Code comedy-mystery film directed by W. S. Van Dyke and based on the 1934 novel by Dashiell Hammett. The film stars William Powell and Myrna Loy as Nick and Nora Charles, a leisure-class couple who enjoy copious drinking and flirtatious banter. Nick is a retired private detective who left his very successful career when he married Nora, a wealthy heiress accustomed to high society. Their wire-haired fox terrier Asta was played by canine actor Skippy. It marked the film debut of Cesar Romero.

The film's screenplay was written by Albert Hackett and Frances Goodrich, a married couple. In 1934, the film was nominated for the Academy Award for Best Picture. The eponymous "Thin Man" is not Nick Charles, but the man Charles is initially hired to find – Clyde Wynant. In the original novel Charles is described as being overweight and out of shape while Charles describes Wynant as a "thin man with white hair". The trim William Powell was cast for the films, leading many viewers to believe it referred to Nick Charles and, it was subsequently used in the titles of sequels as if referring to Charles. It was followed by five sequels. In 1997, it was selected for preservation in the United States National Film Registry by the Library of Congress having been deemed "culturally, historically, or aesthetically significant".

== Plot ==
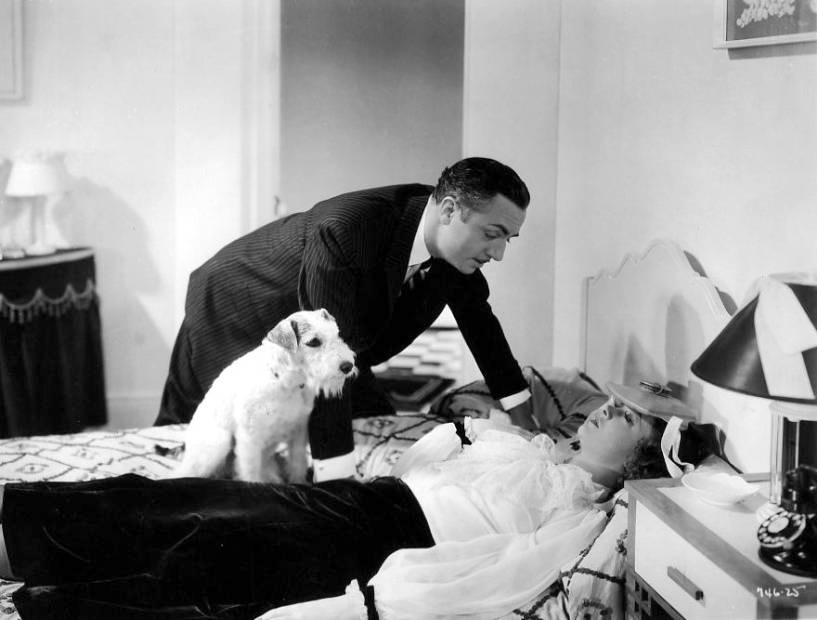
William Powell, Myrna Loy and Skippy (Asta) in The Thin Man

Dorothy Wynant informs her inventor father Clyde of her upcoming wedding. Later, Clyde discovers that bonds worth $50,000, intended as a wedding gift for Dorothy, are missing from his safe. Immediately suspecting his mistress and former secretary, Julia Wolf, Clyde storms into her apartment and finds her in the company of another man, Joe Morelli. Julia confesses that she cashed in the bonds and has only $25,000 left. Clyde threatens to call the police unless she comes up with the other $25,000.

Three months later, Nick Charles, a retired detective who once worked on a case for Clyde, is visiting New York City for Christmas with his heiress wife, Nora, with whom he lives in San Francisco. While in New York, Nick runs into Dorothy, who tells him that her father has disappeared after leaving on a secret business trip to an undisclosed destination, with a promise to return home before her wedding. Clyde's lawyer Herbert MacCaulay had been sending money to Clyde through Julia. Dorothy's mother and Clyde's ex-wife, Mimi, is now married to Chris Jorgenson, a penniless man, and has been living off Clyde's alimony payments.

Mimi finds Julia murdered in her apartment and secretly removes Clyde's watch chain from Julia's hand. Clyde becomes the prime suspect, but Dorothy refuses to believe that her father is guilty. Nick and Lieutenant John Guild visit an informant, Arthur Nunheim, to question him, but he slips away down the fire escape. Later, Nunheim is on the phone blackmailing someone for $5,000 to keep quiet about the murder and leave town. When Nunheim arrives to collect the money, he is immediately shot and killed by an unseen assailant with what police find was the same gun that killed Julia.

Guild deduces that Clyde committed both murders after Mimi hands over her ex-husband's watch chain. One night, Nick searches Clyde's closed shop for clues with his dog Asta, who discovers human skeletal remains buried in the basement. Nick catches Tanner, Clyde's bookkeeper and an ex-convict once arrested by Nick, sneaking into the shop. Tanner admits to having embezzled money from Clyde, claiming he came to the shop to return the money.

The police conclude that Clyde murdered Julia, Nunheim, and this newly discovered corpse, assuming that the remains belong to an old enemy of Clyde's, based on the clothes worn by the skeleton. While examining the body's X-rays, Nick notices an old piece of shrapnel in the corpse's leg. He theorizes with Nora that the body was that of Clyde himself, recounting that Clyde had shrapnel in his shin, and since he has been dead for a few months, he could not be a murder suspect.

To expose the murderer, Nick invites all the suspects to a dinner party, including Dorothy, Mimi, Chris, MacCaulay, Morelli, and Tanner. Nick tells the dinner guests that he saw Clyde the night before—not revealing he means Clyde's corpse. When Mimi claims to have also seen Clyde the night before, Nick announces that the corpse was that of Clyde. He explains that Julia was embezzling from Clyde and splitting the money with Tanner. Clyde went after the man he thought was robbing him, and that man killed Clyde. The murderer buried Clyde's body with another man's clothes and wrote letters to MacCaulay, signing Clyde's name, so MacCaulay would continue to send money to Julia.

The culprit murdered Julia, afraid that she might double-cross him, and planted Clyde's watch chain in her hand. He then murdered Nunheim since he had witnessed Julia's murder and was blackmailing him. The murderer bribed Mimi into claiming she had seen Clyde alive. MacCaulay drew up Clyde's will to cut Mimi off if she remarried. However, Mimi was never legally married to Chris as he did not divorce his former wife, so Mimi is no longer excluded from Clyde's will. As MacCaulay hides a gun under the table, Nick punches him out and declares MacCaulay to be the murderer.

Later, Nick and Nora, along with Dorothy and her new husband Tommy, celebrate as they ride a train back to California.

== Cast ==
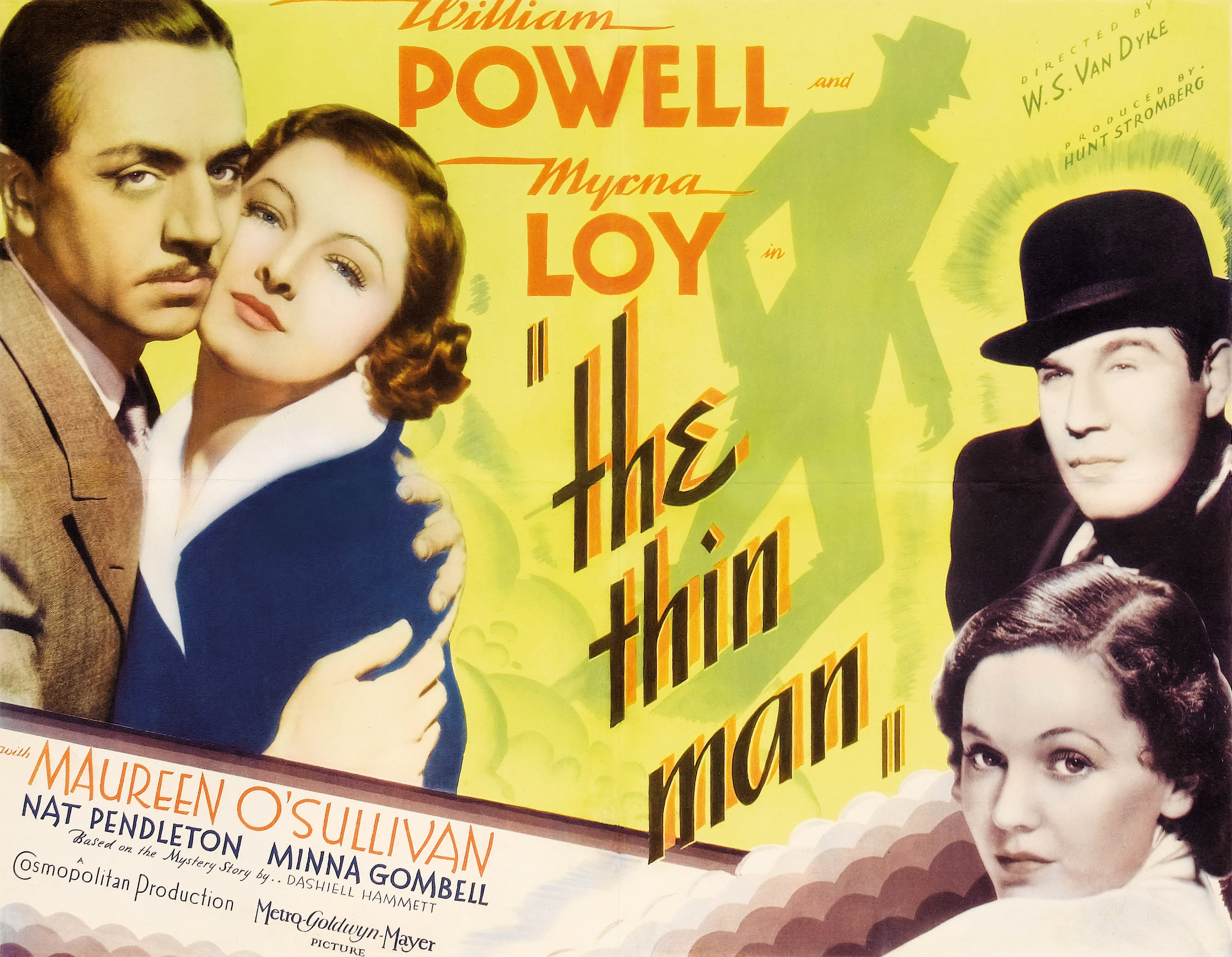
Lobby card

- William Powell as Nick Charles
- Myrna Loy as Nora Charles
- Maureen O'Sullivan as Dorothy Wynant
- Nat Pendleton as Lieutenant John Guild
- Minna Gombell as Mimi Wynant Jorgenson
- Porter Hall as Herbert MacCaulay
- Henry Wadsworth as Tommy
- William Henry as Gilbert Wynant
- Harold Huber as Arthur Nunheim
- Cesar Romero as Chris Jorgenson
- Natalie Moorhead as Julia Wolf
- Edward Brophy as Joe Morelli
- Edward Ellis as Clyde Wynant, the "thin man"
- Cyril Thornton as Tanner
- Skippy as Asta (uncredited), Nick and Nora's dog

Cast notes:

- Nat Pendleton reprised the role of Lieutenant Guild in Another Thin Man (1939).
- Edward Brophy returned to the series as Brogan in The Thin Man Goes Home (1944).

== Production ==
=== Screenplay ===
The film was based on the novel of the same name by Dashiell Hammett, released in January 1934. Hammett's novel drew on his experiences as a union-busting Pinkerton detective in Butte, Montana. Hammett based Nick and Nora's banter upon his rocky on-again, off-again relationship with playwright Lillian Hellman.

MGM paid Hammett $21,000 for the screen rights to the novel. The screenplay was written by Albert Hackett and Frances Goodrich, who had been married for three years. Director W.S. Van Dyke encouraged them to use Hammett's writing as a basis only, and to concentrate on providing witty exchanges for Nick and Nora.

=== Casting ===
Van Dyke convinced MGM executives to let Powell and Loy portray the lead characters despite concerns that Powell was too old and strait-laced to play Nick Charles and that Loy had become typecast in exotic femme fatale roles.

Skippy played Asta, the dog of Nick and Nora. Skippy was subsequently cast in two screwball comedy classics, The Awful Truth (1937) for Columbia Pictures and Bringing Up Baby (1938) for RKO Pictures.

=== Filming ===
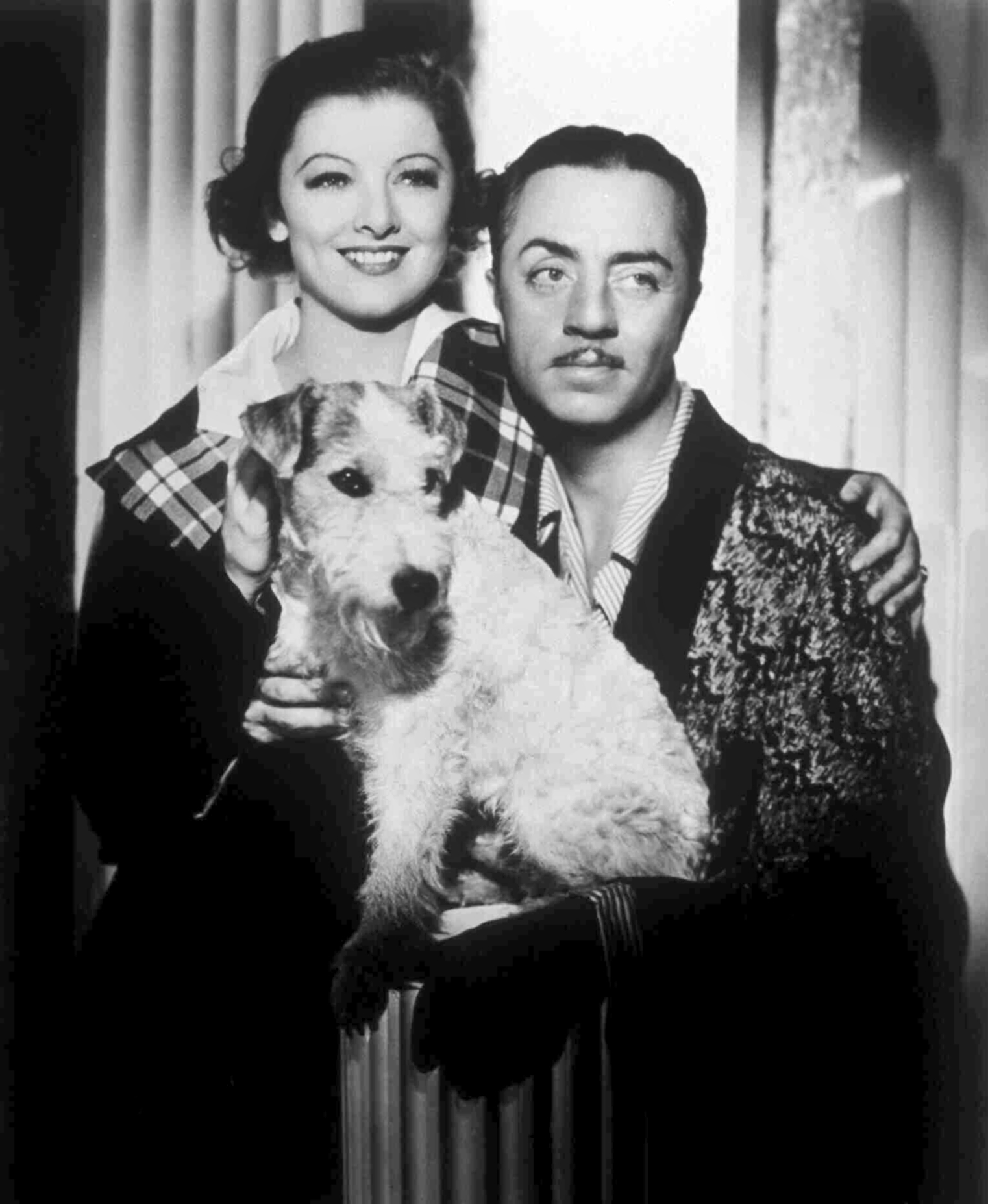
Myrna Loy, William Powell and Skippy

[Nick and Nora were the] first on-screen Hollywood couple for whom matrimony did not signal the end of sex, romance and adventure.

— Film historian Andrew Sarris (1998)

The film was shot with a budget of $226,408 by cinematographer James Wong Howe. For Powell's first scene in the film, Van Dyke told him to take the cocktail shaker, go to the bar and just walk through the scene while the crew checked lights and sound. Powell did it, throwing in some lines and business of his own. Suddenly he heard Van Dyke say, "That's it! Print it!" The director had decided to shoot the scene without Powell knowing it so that he would be as relaxed and natural as possible.

Van Dyke often did not bother with cover shots if he felt the scene was right on the first take, reasoning that actors "lose their fire" if they have to do something over and over. It was a lot of pressure on the actors, who often had to learn new lines and business immediately before shooting, without the luxury of retakes, but Loy credited much of the appeal of the film to Van Dyke's pacing and spontaneity. He paid the most attention to Powell and Loy's easy banter between takes and their obvious enjoyment of each other's company and worked it into the movie. The director often encouraged and incorporated improvisation and off-the-cuff details into the picture. In order to keep her entrance fresh and spontaneous, Van Dyke did not tell Loy about it until right before they shot it.

Powell loved working so much with Loy because of her naturalness, her professionalism, and her lack of any kind of "diva" temperament. Of her, Powell said:

When we did a scene together, we forgot about technique, camera angles, and microphones. We weren't acting. We were just two people in perfect harmony. Myrna, unlike some actresses who think only of themselves, has the happy faculty of being able to listen while the other fellow says his lines. She has the give and takes of acting that brings out the best.

According to Loy, the actors were not allowed to interact between takes with the dog Skippy; trainers felt it would break his concentration. Skippy once bit Loy during filming.

Although she had great compliments for Powell's charm and wit, Maureen O'Sullivan (who played the daughter of Wynant) later said she did not enjoy making the picture because her part was so small and the production was so rushed.

The scene of Nick shooting the ornaments off the tree was added after Powell playfully picked up an air gun and started shooting ornaments the art department was putting up.

Loy wrote that the biggest problem during shooting was the climactic dinner party scene in which Nick reveals the killer. Powell complained that he had too many lines to learn and could barely decipher the complicated plot he was unraveling. It was the one scene when several retakes were necessary, which brought up an entirely new problem. The script called for oysters to be served to the dinner guests and, in take after take, the same plate of oysters was brought out under the hot lights. Loy recalled that "they began to putrefy. By the time we finished that scene, nobody ever wanted to see another oyster".

== Reception ==
The Thin Man was released on May 25, 1934, to overwhelmingly positive reviews, with special praise for the chemistry between Loy and Powell. Mordaunt Hall of The New York Times called it "an excellent combination of comedy and excitement", and the film appeared on the Times year-end list of the ten best of the year. Variety reported that "The Thin Man was an entertaining novel, and now it's an entertaining picture. For its leads the studio couldn't have done better than to pick Powell and Miss Loy, both of whom shade their semi-comic roles beautifully". Film Daily raved: "The screen seldom presents a more thoroughly interesting piece of entertainment than this adaptation of Dashiell Hammett's popular novel. The rapid fire dialogue is about the best heard since talkies, and it is delivered by Powell and Miss Loy to perfection". John Mosher of The New Yorker wrote that Loy and Powell played their parts "beautifully", adding: "All the people of the book are there, and I think the final scenes of the solution of the mystery are handled on a higher note than they were in print". Louella Parsons called it "the greatest entertainment, the most fun and the best mystery-drama of the year". The Chicago Tribune said that it was "exciting", "amusing" and "fat with ultra, ultra-sophisticated situations and dialog". It also called Powell and Loy "delightful". Harrison Carroll of The Los Angeles Herald-Express wrote that it was "one of the cleverest adaptations of a popular novel that Hollywood has ever turned out".

The film was such a box-office success that it spawned five sequels:

- After the Thin Man (1936)
- Another Thin Man (1939)
- Shadow of the Thin Man (1941)
- The Thin Man Goes Home (1944)
- Song of the Thin Man (1947)

The film was voted one of the ten best pictures of the year by Film Daily's annual poll of critics.

In 2002, critic Roger Ebert added the film to his list of Great Movies. Ebert praised William Powell's performance in particular, stating that Powell "is to dialogue as Fred Astaire is to dance. His delivery is so droll and insinuating, so knowing and innocent at the same time, that it hardly matters what he's saying".

Japanese filmmaker Akira Kurosawa cited The Thin Man as one of his favorite films.

The film is ranked 32nd on the American Film Institute's 2000 list AFI's 100 Years...100 Laughs.

The February 2020 issue of New York Magazine listed The Thin Man as among "The Best Movies That Lost Best Picture at the Oscars."

On the review aggregator website Rotten Tomatoes, 98% of 47 critics' reviews are positive. The website's consensus reads: "Featuring an involving mystery and sparkling repartee between William Powell and Myrna Loy, The Thin Man is an endlessly charming romp." Metacritic, which uses a weighted average, assigned the film a score of 86 out of 100, based on 17 critics, indicating "universal acclaim".

=== Accolades ===
Award	Category	Nominee(s)	Result	Ref.
Academy Awards	Best Picture	Hunt Stromberg	Nominated	
Academy Awards	Best Director	W.S. Van Dyke	Nominated	
Academy Awards	Best Actor	William Powell	Nominated	
Academy Awards	Best Adaptation	Albert Hackett and Frances Goodrich	Nominated	

== Box office ==
The Thin Man earned total theater rentals of $1,423,000, with $818,000 from the US and Canada and $605,000 in other foreign rentals, resulting in a profit of $729,000.

== Trailer ==
Trailer for The Thin Man

The trailer contained specially filmed footage in which Nick Charles (William Powell) is seen on the cover of the Dashiell Hammett novel The Thin Man. Nick Charles then steps out of the cover to talk to fellow detective Philo Vance (also played by Powell) about his latest case. Charles mentions he hasn't seen Vance since The Kennel Murder Case, a film in which Powell played Vance, released in October 1933, just seven months prior to the release of The Thin Man. Charles goes on to explain to Vance that his latest case revolves around a "tall, thin man" (referring to Clyde Wynant's character), just before clips of the film are shown.

== Adaptations ==
The Thin Man was dramatized as a radio play on an hour-long broadcast of Lux Radio Theatre on June 8, 1936. William Powell, Myrna Loy, Minna Gombell, Porter Hall, William Henry, and Thomas Jackson reprised their film roles, and W. S. Van Dyke was host.

== Home media ==
On July 30, 2019, The Thin Man was released on Blu-ray Disc by the Warner Archive Collection. The 1080p high-definition master was made from a 4K restoration based on new transfers of the picture's best surviving film elements, with digital correction of a multitude of defects seen in earlier home-media releases. Blu-ray.com reported that the film "looks exceptional and, aside from a true 4K option, will likely never get a better home video release". Extras include the theatrical trailer, the 1936 Lux Radio Theatre broadcast, and the 1958 second-season premiere of the NBC television series.

== In popular culture ==
- The TV series The Thin Man ran from 1957 through 1959, starring Peter Lawford and Phyllis Kirk.
- In the 1976 comedy spoof movie Murder by Death, the characters of Nick and Nora Charles became Dick and Dora Charleston, played by David Niven and Maggie Smith.
- Creators Rachel Cohn and David Levithan named their lead characters in the 2008 film Nick & Norah's Infinite Playlist as an homage to the characters in The Thin Man.
- The 2022 science fiction novel The Spare Man by Mary Robinette Kowal is a sci-fi take on the Nick and Nora characters, but set in space.

== See also ==
- National Recovery Administration (NRA), the logo displayed at start of film
