= Nick & Nora (musical) =

- Original cast recording
- Music: Charles Strouse
- Lyrics: Richard Maltby, Jr.
- Book: Arthur Laurents
- Basis: Characters created by Dashiell Hammett in his novel The Thin Man
- Productions: 1991 Broadway; 2015 San Francisco

Nick & Nora is a musical with a book by Arthur Laurents, lyrics by Richard Maltby, Jr., and music by Charles Strouse.

The plot involves witty and urbane high society couple Nick and Nora Charles, characters created by Dashiell Hammett in his novel The Thin Man, which inspired six films, a radio show, and a television series. In this version, the two are attempting to solve the murder of a bookkeeper on a film production in Hollywood. Crucially, the musical departs from the formula of previous incarnations, defined by the chemistry between Nick and Nora, by creating a subplot of marital woes and tensions between them.

The show had a brief run of nine performances on Broadway in 1991, and was remounted for the first and only time by San Francisco's 42nd Street Moon in April 2015.

== Production ==
Citing high costs, the producers opted to replace out-of-town tryouts (originally scheduled for the Mechanic Theatre, Baltimore, Maryland) with a longer than usual nine-week preview period of 71 previews in New York City. During this time the musical underwent extensive script rewrites, multiple song replacements, and a major cast change. (It was surpassed by a record of 15 weeks of previews for the Broadway musical Spider-Man: Turn Off the Dark which finally opened on Broadway in June 2011.)

The Broadway production, directed by Laurents and choreographed by Tina Paul, finally opened on December 8, 1991, at the Marquis Theatre where, unable to overcome the bad publicity and brutal reviews, it ran for only nine performances. The cast included Barry Bostwick (Nick Charles), Joanna Gleason (Nora Charles), Christine Baranski, Debra Monk, Faith Prince, and Chris Sarandon.

The show was nominated for the Tony Award for Best Original Score. An original cast recording was released on That's Entertainment Records (TER), and was re-released on Jay Records in 1997.

In his memoir Original Story By, Laurents confessed he didn't realize until the show was in previews that the characters of Nick and Nora Charles were identified so closely with William Powell and Myrna Loy that the public would have difficulty accepting anyone else in the roles. He also felt the lengthy preview period, during which theatre gossips and newspaper columnists spread largely unfounded rumors about the show's mounting problems, helped destroy any chances of success it may have had.

== Original Broadway Cast ==
- Barry Bostwick as Nick Charles
- Joanna Gleason as Nora Charles
- Christine Baranski as Tracy Gardner
- Chris Sarandon as Victor Moisa
- Remak Ramsay as Max Bernheim
- Faith Prince as Lorraine Bixby
- Michael Lombard as Lt. Wolfe
- Debra Monk as Lily Connors
- Yvette Lawrence as Maria Valdez
- Kip Niven as Edward J. Connors
- Jeff Brooks as Spider Malloy
- Thom Sesma as Yukido

== Song list ==
Act I

- "Is There Anything Better Than Dancing?" - Nick Charles, Nora Charles and Tracy Gardner
- "Everybody Wants to Do a Musical" - Tracy Gardner
- "Max's Story" - Max Bernheim, Lorraine Bixby and Edward J. Connors
- "Swell" - Nick Charles, Spider Malloy, Nora Charles and Victor Moisa
- "As Long As You're Happy" - Nick Charles and Nora Charles
- "People Get Hurt" - Lily Connors
- "Men" - Lorraine Bixby, Victor Moisa, Edward J. Connors and Tracy Gardner
- "May the Best Man Win" - Nick Charles, Nora Charles and Tracy Gardner
- "Detectiveland" - Company
- "Look Who's Alone Now" - Nick Charles

Act II

- "Class" - Victor Moisa
- "Beyond Words" - Nora Charles
- "A Busy Night at Lorraine's" - Nick Charles, Nora Charles, Spider Malloy, and Suspects
- "Boom Chicka Boom" - Maria Valdez and Mariachi
- "Let's Go Home" - Nick Charles, Nora Charles

== Reception ==
In his review in Time, William A. Henry III called the production "a crashing bore - cranky and arbitrary as a love story, tedious and pointless as a murder mystery, ham-handed as comedy, clubfooted as dance, at best wanly pleasant as music." He added, "A few scenes work, some quite well. The final 10 minutes achieve a truth and simplicity underscoring the barren brittleness of what has gone before. But ultimately the show fails at its most basic task: making audiences care about, or for that matter simply believe in, the characters."

Frank Rich in his review in The New York Times wrote:"...this musical will no doubt always be remembered, and not without fondness, for its troubled preview period, its much-postponed opening, its hassles with snooping journalists and its conflict with the city's Consumer Affairs Commissioner. Indeed, the story of 'Nick and Nora' in previews, should it ever be fully known, might in itself make for a riotous, 1930's-style screwball-comedy musical. But the plodding show that has emerged from all this tumult is, a few bright spots notwithstanding, an almost instantly forgettable mediocrity."

The bad reputation of the musical earned it the nickname "Nick & Snora".
