= The Thin Man (TV series) =

U.S. television detective drama series

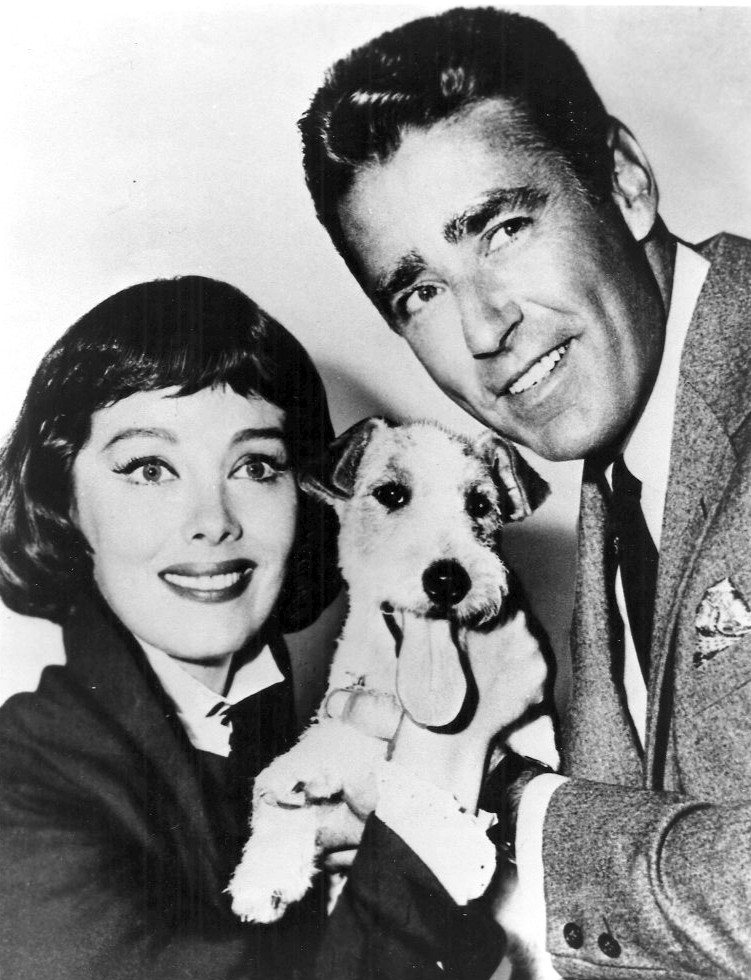
- Phyllis Kirk, Peter Lawford, and Asta the dog, 1957.
- Genre: Comedy; Drama; Detective
- Based on: The Thin Man by Dashiell Hammett
- Written by: Ben Starr
- Starring: Peter Lawford; Phyllis Kirk
- Theme music composer: Johnny Green (Season 1); Pete Rugolo (Season 2)
- Country of origin: United States
- Original language: English
- No. of seasons: 2
- No. of episodes: 72

Production
- Running time: 1/2 hour (25:33 minutes)
- Production companies: Clarington Productions; MGM Television

Original release
- Network: NBC
- Release: September 20, 1957 – August 28, 1959

The Thin Man is a half-hour weekly television series based on the mystery novel The Thin Man (1933) by Dashiell Hammett. The 72 episodes were produced by MGM Television and broadcast by NBC for two seasons from 1957–1959 on Friday evening. It was the first TV series produced by MGM.

== Overview ==
The series starred Peter Lawford and Phyllis Kirk as Nick and Nora Charles. The dog, Asta, was played by three identical wire-hair terriers. Jack Albertson, Patricia Donahue, and Nita Talbot had recurring roles during the show's second season. Albertson played Lieutenant Harry Evans of the New York Police Department. Donahue played Hazel, Nick and Nora's neighbor. Talbot played Beatrice Dane, alias Blondie Collins, a criminal who dragged Nick and Nora into her schemes. Both Hazel and Beatrice made attempts to seduce Nick. Nora's jealousy fueled her sarcasm on these occasions.

A newspaper columnist wrote that Nora Charles's role was different from that of other female leads in detective programs on television. Kirk commented:

We were the first of the sophisticated detective dramas, and from the scripts it was simple to see that the part of Nora Charles was that of a leading lady who made more than token appearances. Since then some of the new shows just use girls as part of the scenery.

Among the series guest stars was Billy Gray, who appeared at the same time he was cast as James "Bud" Anderson, Jr., in Father Knows Best. Ann McCrea was cast as Billie in the 1958 episode, "The Lost Last Chapter". Of note is the "guest star" in the episode "Robot Client": the original Robby the Robot from the 1956 film Forbidden Planet. This episode is available as an extra on the Forbidden Planet DVD.

Ben Starr was the program's writer, while Sam Marx was the executive producer. Episodes were shot back to back across the two seasons. In May 1959, Kirk revealed that she and Lawford were contractually attached to the series until August. Lawford co produced the series.

The series began airing on Sony's GetTV in March 2016.

== Episode list ==
=== Season 1: 1957–58 ===
| No. overall | No. in season | Title | Directed by | Written by | Original release date |
|---|---|---|---|---|---|
| 1 | 1 | "The Dollar Doodle" | Unknown | Unknown | September 20, 1957 |
| 2 | 2 | "Duke of Sing Sing" | Unknown | Unknown | September 27, 1957 |
| 3 | 3 | "The Angel Biz" | Unknown | Unknown | October 4, 1957 |
| 4 | 4 | "Come Back Darling Asta" | John Meredyth Lucas | Story by : Herman Groves; Teleplay by : Dean Riesner & Martin Ragaway | October 11, 1957 |
| 5 | 5 | "Paris Pendant" | Unknown | Unknown | October 18, 1957 |
| 6 | 6 | "That's the Spirit" | Unknown | Unknown | October 25, 1957 |
| 7 | 7 | "Acrostic Murder" | Unknown | Unknown | November 1, 1957 |
| 8 | 8 | "Dead Duck" | Unknown | Unknown | November 8, 1957 |
| 9 | 9 | "Fatal Cliche" | Unknown | Unknown | November 15, 1957 |
| 10 | 10 | "Ring Around Rosie" | Unknown | Unknown | November 22, 1957 |
| 11 | 11 | "Angels in Paradise" | Unknown | Unknown | November 29, 1957 |
| 12 | 12 | "The Fashion Showdown" | Unknown | Unknown | December 6, 1957 |
| 13 | 13 | "Dead Giveaway" | Unknown | Unknown | December 13, 1957 |
| 14 | 14 | "Unwelcome Alibi" | Unknown | Unknown | December 27, 1957 |
| 15 | 15 | "Asta Day" | Unknown | Unknown | January 3, 1958 |
| 16 | 16 | "The Scene Stealer" | Unknown | Unknown | January 10, 1958 |
| 17 | 17 | "Damone Dilemma" | Unknown | Unknown | January 17, 1958 |
| 18 | 18 | "Unlucky Lucky Number" | Unknown | Unknown | January 24, 1958 |
| 19 | 19 | "Man on the Bridge" | Unknown | Unknown | January 31, 1958 |
| 20 | 20 | "Pre-Incan Caper" | Unknown | Unknown | February 7, 1958 |
| 21 | 21 | "Murder Is Where You Find It" | Unknown | Unknown | February 14, 1958 |
| 22 | 22 | "Ship Shakedown" | Unknown | Unknown | February 21, 1958 |
| 23 | 23 | "Robot Client" | Oscar Rudolph | Devery Freeman | February 28, 1958 |
| 24 | 24 | "The Mystery of the Missing Murders" | Unknown | Unknown | March 7, 1958 |
| 25 | 25 | "Double Jeopardy" | Unknown | Unknown | March 14, 1958 |
| 26 | 26 | "Bookworms" | Unknown | Unknown | March 21, 1958 |
| 27 | 27 | "Jittery Juror" | Bretaigne Windust | Phil Davis & Charles Hoffman | March 28, 1958 |
| 28 | 28 | "The Departed Doctor" | Unknown | Unknown | April 4, 1958 |
| 29 | 29 | "The Tennis Champ" | Unknown | Unknown | April 11, 1958 |
| 30 | 30 | "The Delinquent" | Unknown | Unknown | April 18, 1958 |
| 31 | 31 | "The Painted Witnesses" | Unknown | Unknown | May 2, 1958 |
| 32 | 32 | "The Saucer People" | Unknown | Unknown | May 9, 1958 |
| 33 | 33 | "The Carstadt Man" | Unknown | Unknown | May 16, 1958 |
| 34 | 34 | "The Art of Murder" | Unknown | Unknown | May 23, 1958 |
| 35 | 35 | "Kappa Kappa Kaper" | Unknown | Unknown | May 30, 1958 |
| 36 | 36 | "The Valley Forger" | Unknown | Unknown | June 6, 1958 |
| 37 | 37 | "The Screaming Doll" | Unknown | Unknown | June 13, 1958 |

=== Season 2: 1958–59 ===
| No. overall | No. in season | Title | Original release date |
|---|---|---|---|
| 38 | 1 | "Scene of the Crime" | October 24, 1958 |
| 39 | 2 | "Housewarming" | October 31, 1958 |
| 40 | 3 | "Pack My Gat, Beulah" | November 7, 1958 |
| 41 | 4 | "Lost Last Chapter" | November 14, 1958 |
| 42 | 5 | "I Loathe You, Darling" | November 21, 1958 |
| 43 | 6 | "Human Bomb" | November 28, 1958 |
| 44 | 7 | "Plague of Pigeons" | December 5, 1958 |
| 45 | 8 | "Design for Murder" | December 12, 1958 |
| 46 | 9 | "Murder in Mink" | December 19, 1958 |
| 47 | 10 | "Lady on the Lam" | December 26, 1958 |
| 48 | 11 | "Beauty and the Bath" | January 2, 1959 |
| 49 | 12 | "The Case of the Baggy Pants" | January 9, 1959 |
| 50 | 13 | "Maine Thing" | January 23, 1959 |
| 51 | 14 | "Outrageous" | January 30, 1959 |
| 52 | 15 | "The Big Holdout" | February 6, 1959 |
| 53 | 16 | "Perfect Servant" | February 13, 1959 |
| 54 | 17 | "A Funny Thing Happened on the Way to the Morgue" | February 20, 1959 |
| 55 | 18 | "Black Wind and Lightning" | February 27, 1959 |
| 56 | 19 | "Holiday for Hazel" | March 6, 1959 |
| 57 | 20 | "Lady Frankenstein" | March 13, 1959 |
| 58 | 21 | "Mayhem to Music" | March 20, 1959 |
| 59 | 22 | "La Sabre Invecta Est?" | March 27, 1959 |
| 60 | 23 | "Gory Road" | April 3, 1959 |
| 61 | 24 | "Anonymity Anyone?" | April 10, 1959 |
| 62 | 25 | "That's Gratitude" | April 17, 1959 |
| 63 | 26 | "The Cat Kicker" | April 24, 1959 |
| 64 | 27 | "Bronze Bonze" | May 1, 1959 |
| 65 | 28 | "Requiem for a Recluse" | May 8, 1959 |
| 66 | 29 | "Nora Goes Over the Wall" | May 15, 1959 |
| 67 | 30 | "Hamilton Hollered Help" | May 22, 1959 |
| 68 | 31 | "Dear Dead Days" | May 29, 1959 |
| 69 | 32 | "Cold Cargo" | June 12, 1959 |
| 70 | 33 | "Bat McKidderick Esq." | June 12, 1959 |
| 71 | 34 | "Cherchez La Sexpot" | June 19, 1959 |
| 72 | 35 | "Paradise Discovered" | June 26, 1959 |
