= Another Thin Man =

1939 film by W. S. Van Dyke

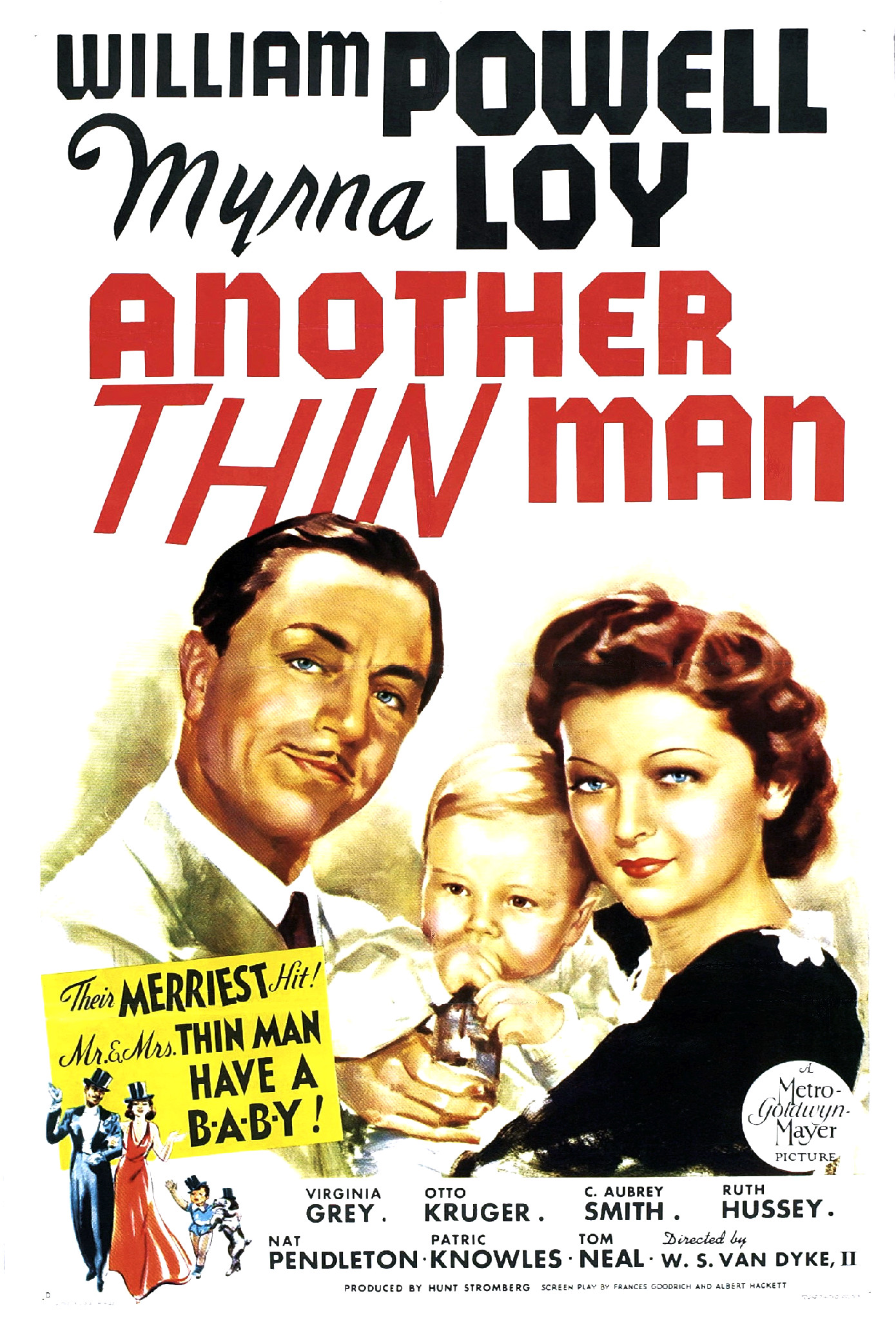
- Theatrical release poster
- Directed by: W. S. Van Dyke
- Screenplay by: Frances Goodrich; Albert Hackett; Anita Loos (Note: Contributing writer (uncredited))
- Story by: Dashiell Hammett
- Based on: The Farewell Murder by Dashiell Hammett
- Produced by: Hunt Stromberg
- Starring: William Powell; Myrna Loy; Virginia Grey; Otto Kruger; C. Aubrey Smith; Ruth Hussey; Nat Pendleton; Patric Knowles; Tom Neal
- Cinematography: Oliver T. Marsh; William H. Daniels
- Edited by: Fredrick Y. Smith
- Music by: Edward Ward
- Production company: Metro-Goldwyn-Mayer
- Distributed by: Loew's Inc.
- Release date: November 17, 1939
- Running time: 103 minutes
- Country: United States
- Language: English
- Budget: $1,107,000
- Box office: $2,223,000

Another Thin Man is a 1939 American comedy mystery film directed by W. S. Van Dyke and the third installment in the Thin Man film series. It stars William Powell and Myrna Loy as Nick and Nora Charles and is based on Dashiell Hammett's Continental Op story "The Farewell Murder". The Charles' son Nickie Jr. is introduced for the first time. The cast also features their terrier Asta, Virginia Grey, Otto Kruger, C. Aubrey Smith, Ruth Hussey, Nat Pendleton (reprising his role from 1934's The Thin Man), Patric Knowles, and Tom Neal. Shemp Howard, later of the Three Stooges, appears in an uncredited role as Wacky.

The film was unable to be titled Return of the Thin Man because the actual "Thin Man" (often confused with the detective Nick Charles) was "completely dead", being in fact the victim from the first film. It was followed by Shadow of the Thin Man (1941).

== Plot ==
Nick and Nora Charles return to New York City with Asta and their infant son Nickie Jr. when they are invited by Colonel Burr MacFay, a former business partner of Nora's father, to spend the weekend at his country house on Long Island. Also present are MacFay's adopted daughter Lois, her fiancé Dudley Horn, and MacFay's secretary Freddie Coleman. MacFay has been receiving death threats from his former employee, Phil Church, who was imprisoned for ten years after MacFay used him as a scapegoat for illegal business activities. Church claimed that he had dreamt about MacFay's death three times, and that his dreams come true after the third time.

During dinner, an unknown assailant sets MacFay's swimming pool on fire and kills Lois' dog. Nick visits Church in his nearby villa, and Church explains that in his dreams, MacFay is usually killed by having his throat cut. When Church threatens to "dream" about Nora and Nickie Jr., since Nick's father-in-law was MacFay's partner, Nick punches Church and leaves. Later that night at the house, a gunshot is heard, and MacFay is found murdered in his bedroom with his throat cut; Church quickly becomes the prime suspect. When Nick walks outside, Horn tries to shoot him, but Lois pushes Nick out of the way of the bullet while the police kill Horn.

Nick, Assistant District Attorney Van Slack, and Lieutenant Guild question Church's girlfriend Smitty at her New York City apartment, but she says that she has not heard of Church since he left for Cuba with his Cuban henchman Dum-Dum the previous night. Dum-Dum arrives at Smitty's apartment but quickly flees, pursued by Van Slack and Guild. Nick finds a matchbook from the West Indies Club at Smitty's apartment and leaves.

At the West Indies Club, Nick encounters Dum-Dum and a drunk friend of Church's who tells him about Church's other girlfriend, Linda Mills, and reveals that he never went to Cuba. Before Church's friend can say more, Dum-Dum knocks him out. Nick investigates Linda's apartment, where he discovers a bullet hole in the wall and gunshot residue beside the bed. Two gangsters climb in through the fire escape and hold Nick at gunpoint, but the police arrive to arrest him, as Nick had asked Guild to trail him just in case.

The next day, Nick and Nora celebrate Nickie Jr.'s first birthday in their hotel suite with Lois and Freddie, as well as Nick's ex-convict friends and their babies. Church sneaks in and corners Nick and Nora in the bedroom, threatening to kill Nick unless he abandons the case. As Church escapes over the balcony, he is shot and killed. The police bring Smitty and Dum-Dum into the Charles' suite for questioning. Nick explains that the killer's plan was to be tried for the murder, provide an airtight alibi at the last minute and walk free.

MacFay was already dead when the shot was fired. The shot was fired using a delay mechanism designed by Church, giving the murderer five minutes to establish an alibi, and the only person who used that particular alibi was Lois. Church enlisted Smitty to play his accomplice so no one would suspect Lois. Lois' dog was killed to avoid any suspicion that she was working with Church. Horn, suspecting that Lois murdered MacFay, tried to kill Nick to protect her. Lois, fearing that Horn might give her away, prevented Nick from being shot, speculating that he would shoot Horn in self-defense.

Lois murdered MacFay to obtain her inheritance, and had been leading a double life as Linda Mills. She then killed Church after discovering his affair with Smitty. Lois confesses to her crimes and attempts to walk away by claiming to have kidnapped Nickie Jr. However, Nora rushes into Lois' room and finds another baby in Nickie Jr.'s place. One of Nick's ex-convict friends, Wacky, had left with the wrong baby, which Lois happened to notice. The switched baby's distraught mother returns with Nickie Jr. and reclaims her own child. Lois is arrested, and Nick and Nora enjoy some quiet time with Asta and Nickie Jr.

== Cast ==
- William Powell as Nick Charles
- Myrna Loy as Nora Charles
- Virginia Grey as Lois MacFay
- Otto Kruger as Assistant District Attorney Van Slack
- C. Aubrey Smith as Colonel Burr MacFay
- Ruth Hussey as Dorothy Walters, the Charles' nanny
- Nat Pendleton as Lieutenant John Guild
- Patric Knowles as Dudley Horn, Lois' fiancé
- Tom Neal as Freddie Coleman, MacFay's secretary
- Phyllis Gordon as Mrs. Isabella Bellam, MacFay's housekeeper
- Sheldon Leonard as Phil Church
- Don Costello as "Diamond Back" Vogel
- Harry Bellaver as "Creeps"
- William A. Poulsen as Nickie Jr.
- Muriel Hutchison as Smitty
- Abner Biberman as "Dum-Dum"
- Marjorie Main as Mrs. Dolley
- Skippy as Asta
- Shemp Howard as Wacky (uncredited)

The Afro-Cuban dance team of René and Estela, headliners at the Havana-Madrid Club in New York City, is featured in the floor show at the West Indies Club.

== Reception ==
The film review aggregator website Rotten Tomatoes show's the film score to be 86% based on reviews from 22 professional critics.

According to Frank S. Nugent, "this third of the trademarked Thin Men takes its murders as jauntily as ever, confirms our impression that matrimony need not be too serious a business, and provides as light an entertainment as any holiday-amusement seeker is likely to find".

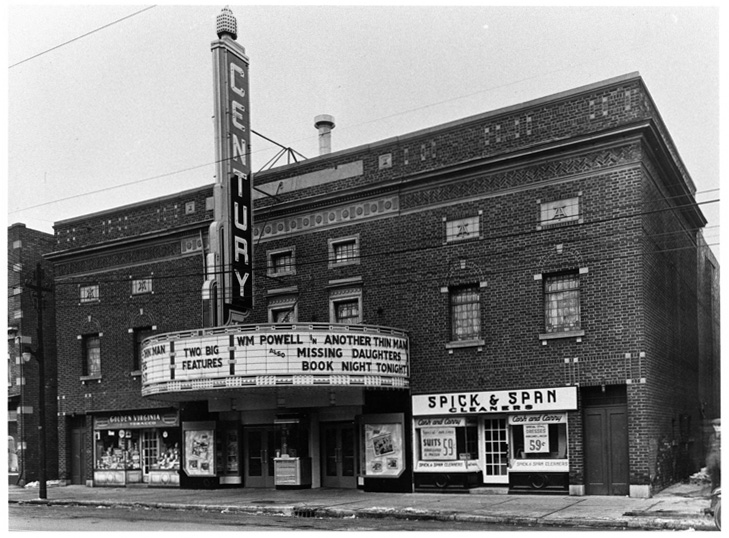
Another Thin Man on the marquee of a Toronto cinema as a double feature with the Richard Arlen film Missing Daughters.

Another Thin Man is the third of six feature films based on the characters of Nick and Nora Charles:

- The Thin Man (1934)
- After the Thin Man (1936)
- Another Thin Man (1939)
- Shadow of the Thin Man (1941)
- The Thin Man Goes Home (1944)
- Song of the Thin Man (1947)

== Box office ==
Another Thin Man grossed a domestic and foreign total of $2,223,000: $1,523,000 from the U.S. and Canada and $700,000 elsewhere. It returned a profit of $394,000.
