= The Thin Man Goes Home =

1944 film by Richard Thorpe

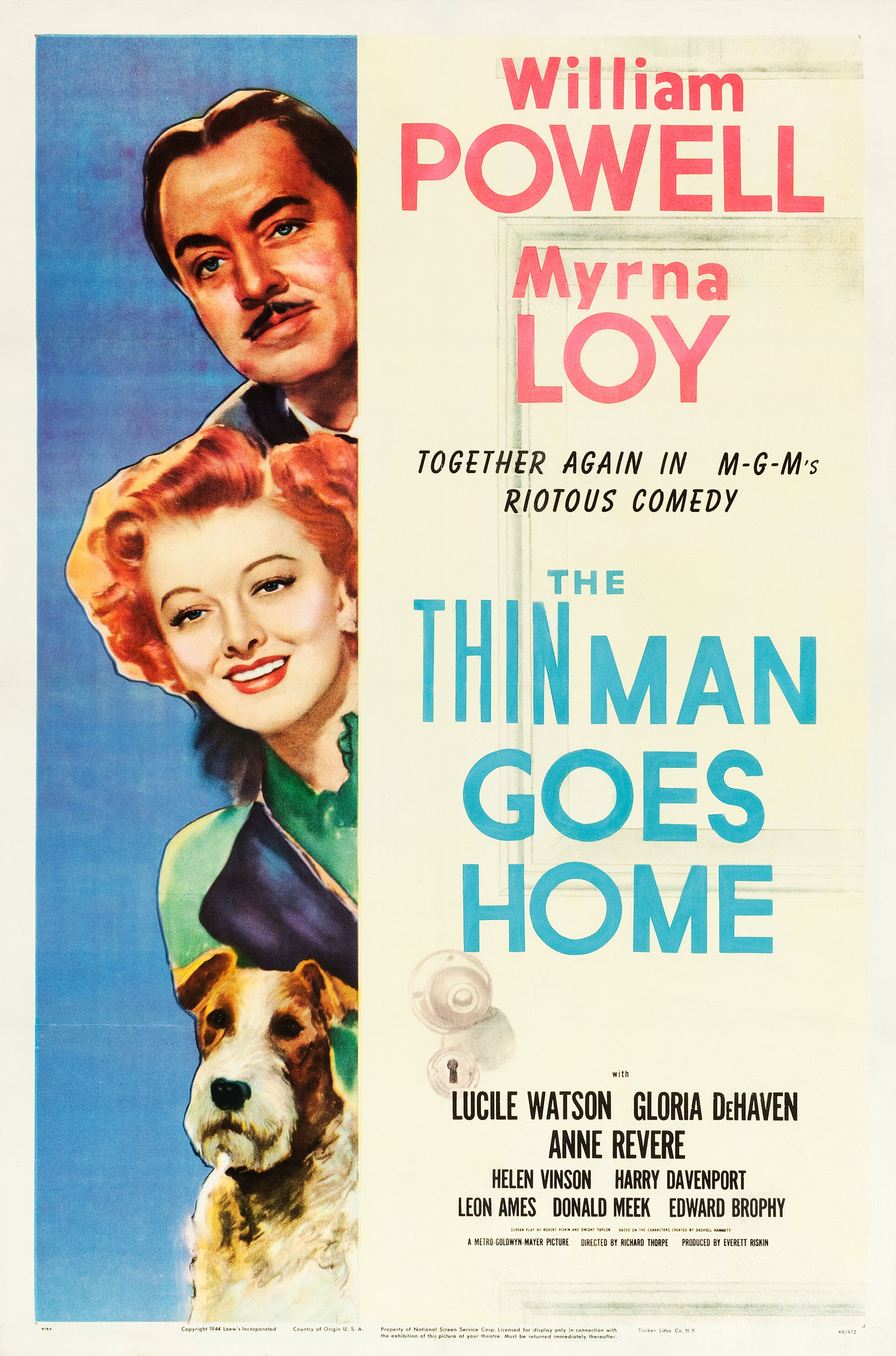
- Theatrical release poster
- Directed by: Richard Thorpe
- Screenplay by: Robert Riskin; Dwight Taylor
- Story by: Robert Riskin; Harry Kurnitz
- Based on: Characters by Dashiell Hammett
- Produced by: Everett Riskin
- Starring: William Powell; Myrna Loy; Lucile Watson; Gloria DeHaven; Anne Revere; Helen Vinson; Harry Davenport; Leon Ames; Donald Meek; Edward Brophy
- Cinematography: Karl Freund
- Edited by: Ralph E. Winters
- Music by: David Snell
- Production company: Metro-Goldwyn-Mayer
- Distributed by: Loew's Inc.
- Release date: November 21, 1944 (New York City)
- Running time: 100 minutes
- Country: United States
- Language: English
- Budget: $1,401,000
- Box office: $2,814,000

The Thin Man Goes Home is a 1944 American comedy mystery film directed by Richard Thorpe. It is the fifth installment in the Thin Man film series starring William Powell and Myrna Loy as Dashiell Hammett's dapper ex-private detective Nick Charles and his wife Nora. The supporting cast includes Lucile Watson, Gloria DeHaven, Anne Revere, Helen Vinson, Harry Davenport, Leon Ames, Donald Meek, and Edward Brophy. It was the first entry in the Thin Man series not directed by W. S. Van Dyke, who had died in 1943.

== Plot ==
Nick and Nora Charles, along with their dog Asta, travel to Nick's small hometown of Sycamore Springs, in New England, to visit his parents and celebrate his birthday. Nora learns of Nick's strained relationship with his father, Dr. Bertram Charles, who is disappointed that his son has not followed in his footsteps as a doctor. In order to impress Bertram, Nora encourages Nick to find a crime to solve in Sycamore Springs. Despite Nick's repeated denials, rumors begin to circulate across town that he is visiting Sycamore Springs to investigate a case, alarming some of the residents—especially Edgar Draque, who tells his wife Helena that they must leave town immediately after acquiring a particular painting by local artist Peter Berton.

Nora buys the Berton painting in Willie Crump's store as a birthday present for Nick, believing that the windmill in the painting holds sentimental value to him. That night, Berton arrives at the Charles' doorstep and is about to confess something to Nick when he is shot dead. An old childhood friend, Dr. Bruce Clayworth, performs the autopsy and extracts a handgun bullet. Nick investigates Berton's residence in an auto camp, discovering that Berton had a fight with someone the other night, presumably over Laurabel Ronson, banking tycoon Sam Ronson's daughter and Tom Clayworth's girlfriend. While searching Berton's room for clues, Nick is knocked unconscious by Crazy Mary, a local eccentric.

The next morning, Nora shows Nick the painting she bought for his birthday, but he tells her that the windmill brings back unpleasant memories for him, so his mother donates it to the upcoming charity bazaar. Nick continues his investigation with a visit to the Ronsons, where Laurabel claims not to know anything about Berton's fight, but Nick upsets her by pointing out that her father objected to her seeing Berton. R.T. Tatum, one of Ronson's employees, threatens to hinder Bertram's plans to build a hospital if Nick does not drop his investigation, but Bertram rebuffs his threats.

Nick discovers that Crazy Mary is Berton's mother; she gave her son up for adoption when he was a child, and he never knew she was his mother. After Edgar offers Nora $500 for the Berton painting, Nora takes Nick to the bazaar at the local hotel, realizing that the painting must be valuable. There, Nick and Nora learn from Crump that Helena bought the painting and that Ronson is among the many people who have been after it. Entering Helena's hotel room, Nick finds that she has been knocked unconscious and that the painting has disappeared. On a hunch, Nick and Nora go to Crazy Mary's shack, where they find her murdered, though Asta uncovers the hidden painting.

Nick has the police gather all the suspects at his parents' house. Using his father's fluoroscope, Nick reveals that each of Berton's five paintings conceals blueprints for a top-secret aircraft propeller manufactured by a company owned by Ronson. Berton was the illegitimate son of Ronson's playboy brother, who ran off with housemaid Crazy Mary to Boston, but died before they could get married. When Berton came of age, Ronson took him back to Sycamore Springs and gave him a job in his plant, but Berton became embroiled in a racket to copy some propeller designs.

The previous night, after stealing the painting from Helena, Ronson took it to Crazy Mary's shack, as she wanted to destroy the evidence against Berton, but she was already dead. After exposing Edgar's involvement in a scheme to sell the blueprints to foreign interests, Nick explains that Berton was killed with a Japanese sniper rifle equipped with a silencer, which belongs to Dr. Clayworth's brother Tom. Nick then accuses Clayworth of switching bullets at Berton's autopsy. Clayworth, who had introduced Edgar to Berton, killed Berton before he could confess everything to Nick, and also killed Crazy Mary.

Clayworth grabs the rifle and points it at Nick, expressing his hatred for Nick for always being better than him in their youth, only to find that Nick had removed the firing pin as a precaution. The police arrest Clayworth, and Bertram congratulates Nick.

== Cast ==
- William Powell as Nick Charles
- Myrna Loy as Nora Charles, Nick's wife
- Lucile Watson as Mrs. Charles, Nick's mother
- Gloria DeHaven as Laurabel "Laura" Ronson
- Anne Revere as Crazy Mary
- Helen Vinson as Helena Draque
- Harry Davenport as Dr. Bertram Charles
- Leon Ames as Edgar Draque
- Donald Meek as Willie Crump
- Edward Brophy as Brogan; in the first film he played a character named Joe Morelli
- Lloyd Corrigan as Dr. Bruce Clayworth
- Anita Bolster as Hilda
- Ralph Brooke as Peter Berton
- Donald MacBride as Police Chief MacGregor
- Morris Ankrum as Willoughby
- Nora Cecil as Miss Peavy
- Minor Watson as Sam Ronson
- Irving Bacon as Tom
- Virginia Sale as Tom's wife
- Paul Langton as Tom Clayworth (uncredited)
- Charles Halton as R.T. Tatum (uncredited)

== Production ==
Production of a Thin Man film had been planned for 1942, but Myrna Loy refused the role because her attention was focused on her recent marriage to John D. Hertz, Jr. and her all-consuming War work for the Red Cross. Fans received the suggestion that Irene Dunne might take over the role of Nora with horror. TCM's Roger Fristoe quotes Powell recalling later: "The fans wanted Myrna, and they didn't want anyone else...And I wanted Myrna, too. Besides the favorable reception our pictures always received, I must say it was certainly a pleasure to work with her". Powell remembered the spectacular welcome Loy received on her first day back to a set thronged with well-wishers: "I've never seen a girl so popular with so many people... Everybody from wardrobe was over the set, everybody from makeup, everybody from property, everybody from miles around, it looked like".

The Thin Man Goes Home was Loy's only wartime picture.

The cocktail shaker, a staple prop from previous films in the series, ceased to be omnipresent in this one, replaced by a running gag about how difficult it is to get a drink in Nick’s hometown: Nick's faithful flask contains only cider. TCM's Notes on the film say that "according to an April 1944 Hollywood Reporter news item, wartime liquor rationing prompted producer Everett Riskin to eliminate the heavy drinking that had been an integral part of Nick and Nora's daily life in previous The Thin Man films".

The film was the fifth of six based on the characters of Nick and Nora:

- The Thin Man (1934)
- After the Thin Man (1936)
- Another Thin Man (1939)
- Shadow of the Thin Man (1941)
- The Thin Man Goes Home (1944)
- Song of the Thin Man (1947)

== Box office ==
According to MGM records, the film earned $1,770,000 in the US and Canada, and $1,044,000 elsewhere resulting in a profit of $501,000.
