= Albert Hackett =

American screenwriter (1900–1995)

- Hackett with his wife Frances Goodrich
- Born: Albert Maurice Hackett; February 16, 1900; New York City
- Died: March 16, 1995 (aged 95)
- Occupations: Dramatist; screenwriter; actor
- Spouses: Frances Goodrich (m. 1931; died 1984) Gisella Svetlik (m. 1985)
- Parent(s): Florence Hackett (mother); Arthur V. Johnson (stepfather)
- Relatives: Raymond Hackett (brother); Blanche Sweet (sister-in-law)

Albert Maurice Hackett (February 16, 1900 – March 16, 1995) was an American actor, dramatist and screenwriter most noted for his collaborations with his partner and wife Frances Goodrich. Their film work includes the first three installments in the Thin Man series, It's a Wonderful Life, Easter Parade, Father of the Bride and Seven Brides for Seven Brothers.

Goodrich and Hackett won a Pulitzer Prize for Drama, the New York Drama Critics' Circle award, and a Tony Award for Best Play for their play The Diary of Anne Frank. They received four nominations for the Academy Award for Best Adapted Screenplay.

== Early life ==
Hackett was born in New York City, the son of actress Florence Hackett (née Hart) and Maurice Hackett. He attended Professional Children's School and started out as a child actor at age six, appearing on stage and in films. He toured in vaudeville. His brother was actor Raymond Hackett. Their stepfather was the early film actor Arthur V. Johnson, who married their mother Florence around 1910. Raymond's second wife was silent film actress Blanche Sweet.

== Career ==
Hackett acted in many films, including Anne of Green Gables (1919). His Broadway credits as a performer include Mr. and Mrs. North (1941), Up Pops the Devil (1930), Mirrors (1928), Off-Key (1927), Twelve Miles Out (1925), The Nervous Wreck (1923), Up the Ladder (1922), Just a Woman (1914) and The Happy Marriage (1909). His Broadway credits as a writer include The Diary of Anne Frank (1955 and 1997), The Great Big Doorstep (1942), Bridal Wise (1932), Everybody's Welcome (1931) and Up Pops the Devil (1930).

For the summer of 1928, Hackett joined the summer stock cast at Denver's Elitch Theatre. Fellow cast member, Frances Goodrich, showed him a script she had written, entitled Such A Lady, and they rewrote it together. This was the beginning of their collaboration.

Soon after marrying Goodrich in 1931, the couple moved to Hollywood to write the screenplay for their stage success Up Pops the Devil for Paramount Pictures. In 1933, they signed a contract with MGM and remained with the studio until 1939. Among their earliest assignments was writing the screenplay for The Thin Man (1934). They were encouraged by director W. S. Van Dyke to use the writing of Dashiell Hammett as a basis only and to concentrate on providing witty exchanges for the principal characters, Nick and Nora Charles (played by William Powell and Myrna Loy). The resulting film became one of the year's major hits, and the script, considered to show a modern relationship in a realistic manner for the first time, was considered groundbreaking, although it preceded enforcement of the Motion Picture Production Code, though the subsequent sequels did not.

Though the Thin Man earned millions at the box office, Goodrich and Hackett only got a $10,000 bonus.

They were surprising choices to co-write the script for the Broadway production of The Diary of Anne Frank since they had never been associated with any Jewish material beforehand. But they dove into research and made a point of corresponding with Anne Frank's father, Otto Frank. They researched European history, Judaism, and Jewish practice; they consulted a rabbi. They travelled to Amsterdam and visited 263 Prinsengracht, the house on the canal where Anne wrote the diary in hiding. Nonetheless, after input from others, including the playwright Lillian Hellman, they ended up removing explicitly Jewish material from the play.

In 1956, the couple won a Pulitzer Prize for Drama, a New York Drama Critics' Circle award, and a Tony Award for Best Play for the play.

The Real Nick and Nora, a dual biography of Hackett and Goodrich, was published in 2002, written by David L. Goodrich, Goodrich’s nephew. .

== Recognition ==
The Hacketts received Academy Award for Screenplay nominations for The Thin Man, After the Thin Man (1936), Father of the Bride (1950) and Seven Brides for Seven Brothers (1955). They won Writers Guild of America awards for Easter Parade (1949), Father's Little Dividend (1951), Seven Brides for Seven Brothers (1954) and The Diary of Anne Frank (1959), and were nominated for In the Good Old Summertime (1949), Father of the Bride (1950) and The Long, Long Trailer (1954). They also won a Pulitzer Prize for Drama and the New York Drama Critics' Circle award for their original play The Diary of Anne Frank. Some of their other films include Another Thin Man (1939) and It's a Wonderful Life (1946).

== Personal life ==
When Hackett first met Goodrich, she was married to the popular historian Hendrick Willem Van Loon. They divorced in 1930 and Hackett and Goodrich were married the following year.

In 1985, one year after Goodrich's death, Hackett married Gisella Svetlik, a former dancer who had appeared in the original Broadway productions of Kiss Me, Kate, Carousel, Follow the Girls, Look, Ma, I'm Dancin'! and Paint Your Wagon. She was the widow of theatrical agent and Emmy Award-winning The Phil Silvers Show writer Harvey Orkin. Svetlik and Hackett were together until his death.

== Death ==
Hackett died of pneumonia at St. Luke's Roosevelt Hospital in Manhattan in 1995.

== Filmography ==
Year	Title	Role	Notes
1912	My Princess	Davey	Short
1912	A College Girl	Tommy – Jean's Brother	Short
1912	In After Years	Little Roy Wilson	Short
1912	The Violin's Message	Bennie Vane – Blossom's Younger Brother	Short
1912	The Wooden Bowl	The Grandson	Short
1912	The Spoiled Child	Albert Harrold – the Younger Son	Short
1912	Just Pretending	Albert Mills – the Little Boy	Short
1912	Two Boys	Albert Manning	Short
1913	Annie Rowley's Fortune	Annie's 2nd Brother	Short
1913	The School Principal	Tommy Moriarty	Short
1913	The Yarn of the 'Nancy Belle'	Child	Short
1914	The Lost Child	The Little Boy	Short
1914	Codes of Honor	Robert Bowditch as a boy (uncredited)	Short
1914	The Lie	Bobbie Phillips – the Little Boy	Short
1914	A Prince of Peace		Short
1914	The House Party	Jack Carstairs – Son	Short
1915	Black Fear	George Martindale	
1918	The Venus Model	Boy	
1919	Come Out of the Kitchen	Charles Daingerfield	
1919	The Career of Katherine Bush	Bert Bush	
1919	Anne of Green Gables	Robert	
1920	Away Goes Prudence	Jimmie Ryan	
1920	The Good-Bad Wife	Leigh Carter	
1921	Molly O	Billy O'Dair	
1922	The Country Flapper	Hopp Jumpp	
1922	A Woman's Woman	Kenneth Plummer	
1922	The Darling of the Rich	Fred Winship	
1930	Whoopee!	Chester Underwood	
