= Nick and Nora Charles =

Fictional characters by Dashiell Hammett

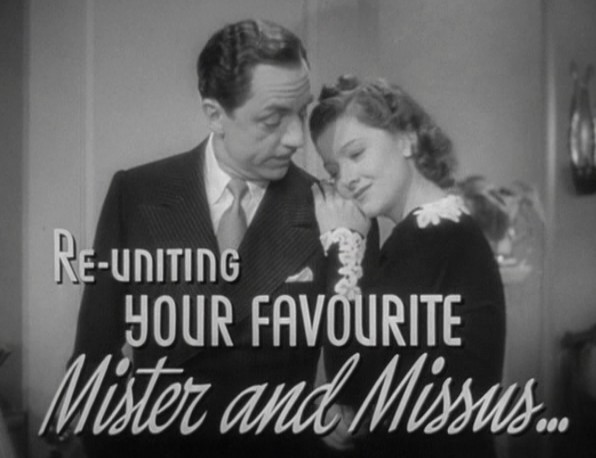
- William Powell and Myrna Loy as Nick & Nora in the trailer for Another Thin Man (1939)
- First appearance: The Thin Man
- Created by: Dashiell Hammett
- Based on: Hammett and Lillian Hellman
- Portrayed by: William Powell & Myrna Loy (film, 1934–1947); Les Damon/Les Tremayne/David Gothard/Joseph Curtin & Claudia Morgan (radio, 1941–1950); Peter Lawford & Phyllis Kirk (TV, 1957–1959); Craig Stevens & Jo Ann Pflug (TV film); Barry Bostwick & Joanna Gleason (Broadway musical)

In-universe information
- Gender: Male & Female
- Occupation: Private detective
- Home: New York City
- Nationality: American

Nick and Nora Charles are fictional characters created by Dashiell Hammett in his novel The Thin Man. The characters were adapted for film in a series of films between 1934 and 1947; for radio from 1941 to 1950; for television from 1957 through 1959; as a Broadway musical in 1991; and as a stage play in 2009.

== Synopsis ==
Nick and Nora are a married couple who solve murders while exchanging witty banter. The popularity of the characters made them a media archetype: the bantering, romantically involved detective couple has since become a common trope in literature, theatre, film and television.

== Novel ==
The characters first appear in Dashiell Hammett's last and best-selling novel, The Thin Man (1934). Nick is a former private detective of Greek ancestry who retired when he married Nora, a wealthy Nob Hill heiress. Hammett reportedly modeled Nora on his longtime partner Lillian Hellman, and the characters' boozy, flippant dialogue on their relationship. (The novel also mentions that Nick was once a detective, as was Hammett.) The novel is considered one of the seminal texts of the hard-boiled subgenre of mystery novels, but the chief innovation distinguishing it from previous Hammett works such as The Maltese Falcon or The Glass Key was its relative lightness and humor. It is nearly as much a comedy of manners as a mystery, and the story tumbles along to the sarcastic banter of Nick and Nora as a reluctant and jaded Nick is dragged into solving a sensational murder, cheered on by the fascinated thrill-seeking Nora.

== Films ==
The film adaptation of The Thin Man was a resounding success. Although Hammett never wrote another novel with Nick and Nora Charles, five movie sequels were produced, two of which were adapted by M.G.M.'s writers from two original Hammett works written after the success of the first film.

The film followed the plot of the novel quite closely, but the Nick Charles character, described in the book as overweight and out of shape, was portrayed by the slim William Powell. Nora was portrayed by Myrna Loy. The title of both the book and the film referred to the murder victim, Clyde Wynant, whom Nick is initially hired to find, but producers referred to "The Thin Man" in the titles of each of the sequel films for branding purposes. As a consequence "The Thin Man" was eventually elided by the public into an alias for the character of Nick Charles. So strongly were Powell and Loy identified with the characters of the Charleses in the public mind that many mistakenly assumed the actors were a couple in real life as well.

The on-screen chemistry between Powell and Loy, who often improvised on the set, was key to the wild success of the series and quickly became a defining feature of the characters. The films revolutionized the screen portrayal of marriage —previously earnest, virtuous, and staid —invigorating it with danger, irreverence, and sex appeal. Taking their cue from Hammett's humorous dialogue and comic elements, the movies moved even further from the traditional hard-boiled approach. In another departure from Hammett, the dog Asta — an integral character in both the book and movies — was a male Wire Fox Terrier, rather than the novel's female schnauzer.

Over time a child, Nick, Jr., was also introduced, and elements of the Charleses' backstory fleshed out. Nick was revealed to be the son of a medical doctor from the fictional small town of Sycamore Springs in upstate New York. The novel's references to his being the child of an immigrant from Greece were ignored, and Nick was now the black sheep of a respectable WASP professional family who turned his back on the family profession of medicine because of his passion for detective work.

Detail was also added to Nora's background. She is shown to be the sole child of a deceased mining magnate from San Francisco modeled on the "kings" of the Comstock Lode. Now diversified into lumber, railroads, etc., Nora's fortune is apparently vast and is managed for the couple by her father's former partner who lives in an estate on Long Island's North Shore "Gold Coast". Nora is also shown to have a network of blue-blood relatives and friends in San Francisco and New York society, while Nick is a beloved celebrity among the criminal classes and those who associate with them (such as police, athletes, nightclub owners, etc.), particularly among San Francisco and New York's Irish communities.

Hugely popular with audiences, the films employed the common murder mystery trope—familiar from English detective stories such as Agatha Christie's Murder on the Orient Express—of assembling all of the characters for the climactic revelation of the culprit. The first film appeared the year after the repeal of Prohibition, and the series is also notable for the extensive and casual use of alcohol by the main characters.

=== Titles ===
- The Thin Man (1934)
- After the Thin Man (1936)
- Another Thin Man (1939)
- Shadow of the Thin Man (1941)
- The Thin Man Goes Home (1945)
- Song of the Thin Man (1947)

== Subsequent adaptations ==
The popularity of the film series spawned a radio program based on them, The Adventures of the Thin Man. It successfully ran from 1941 to 1950, starring Claudia Morgan as Nora, with Les Damon, Les Tremayne, David Gothard and Joseph Curtin all giving voice to Nick, depending on the season.

The television series The Thin Man ran two seasons from 1957 to 1959 starring Peter Lawford and Phyllis Kirk as Nick and Nora. The series transplanted the couple to New York's Greenwich Village, updating the 1930s big band glamour to the 1950s Beat Generation. There were 72 episodes. In 1975, Craig Stevens and Jo Ann Pflug starred in the made-for-TV movie Nick and Nora, part of the Wide World of Mystery series of TV movies.

In 1991, a Broadway musical, Nick & Nora with a book by Arthur Laurents, lyrics by Richard Maltby Jr., and music by Charles Strouse was based on the characters. Barry Bostwick played Nick, and Joanna Gleason played Nora. The chief innovation of this incarnation was to introduce strife and resentment into the relationship. After one of the longest preview periods in Broadway history, the show opened to poor reviews and closed after nine performances.

In 2009, the City Literature Theatre, a Chicago repertory company, mounted a stage production of the original Hammett novel adapted by Terry McCabe. In 2018, Vertigo Theatre in Calgary, Canada premiered a new adaptation of The Thin Man by playwright Lucia Frangione. The Charleses were played by Curt McKinstry and Nadien Chu, respectively. A mostly loyal adaptation of Hammett's novel, the character of Nora Charles was given a new backstory as the Chinese-American heiress of a silk import/export fortune in San Francisco. This added the layer of an interracial marriage between the main characters, and shone light on the systemic racism of pre-WWII America. Frangione said: "An element that was in the original novel and the film was the fact that Nora and Nick were a married couple with no children who spent their Christmas with strangers. Both joy and sorrow hold a couple together, so as a writer I had to ask myself, 'Why are they socially isolated?' Hammett and Hellman were outsiders because of race and politics. So, I decided to flesh out a story point that was already hinted at in the novel and film. Nora is a wealthy heiress from San Francisco, why couldn't she be Chinese? I have always sought intelligent ways to diversify my casts. We live in a multi-racial society, that should be reflected on stage."

The Thrilling Adventure Hour stage show often featured a segment called "Beyond Belief" in which Paul F. Tompkins and Paget Brewster portrayed paranormal mystery-solving couple Frank and Sadie Doyle, who were parodies of Nick and Nora.

In 2011, it was announced that a film version, starring Johnny Depp as Nick Charles, was in development but it has since been shelved.

Nick and Nora were spoofed in the 1976 comedy film Murder by Death. David Niven played detective Dick Charleston and Maggie Smith played his wife Dora Charleston.

== See also ==
- Nick & Nora (glass), named for the characters
- William Powell and Myrna Loy
