= Frances Goodrich =

American writer

- Goodrich with her husband Albert Hackett
- Born: December 21, 1890; Belleville, New Jersey, U.S.
- Died: January 29, 1984 (aged 93); New York City, U.S.
- Education: Vassar College; New York School of Social Work
- Occupation: Screenwriter
- Spouses: Robert Ames (m. 1917; div. 1923) Hendrik Willem van Loon (m. 1927; div. 1930) Albert Hackett (m. 1931)
- Relatives: Henry Demarest Lloyd (uncle)

Frances Goodrich (December 21, 1890 – January 29, 1984) was an American actress, dramatist, and screenwriter, best known for her collaborations with her partner and husband Albert Hackett. She received both the Pulitzer Prize for Drama and the Tony Award for Best Play with her husband for The Diary of Anne Frank which had premiered in 1955.

== Early life ==
Goodrich was born in Belleville, New Jersey, the second daughter of five children, of Madeleine Christy (née Lloyd) and Henry Wickes Goodrich. The family moved to nearby Nutley, New Jersey when Goodrich was two. She attended Collegiate School in Passaic, New Jersey, and graduated from Vassar College in 1912, and attended the New York School of Social Work from 1912 to 1913, but left to become an actress in Henry Miller's productions. In 1924 she appeared in George Kelly's play, The Show Off.

== Career ==
Soon after she left the New York School of Social Work, Goodrich began the acting portion of her career at the Players Club in New York City. From there she went to Northampton, Massachusetts, where she acted in stock theater. Her acting credits on Broadway included Perkins (1918), Daddy Long Legs (1918), Fashions for Men (1922), Queen Victoria (1923), A Good Bad Woman (1925), Skin Deep (1927), and Excess Baggage (1927).

For the summer of 1928, Goodrich joined the summer stock cast at Denver's Elitch Theatre. Goodrich showed Hackett a script she had written, entitled Such A Lady, and they rewrote it together. This was the beginning of their collaboration.

Not long after marrying Hackett, the couple settled in Hollywood in the late 1920s to write the screenplay for their stage success Up Pops the Devil for Paramount Pictures. In 1933, they signed a contract with MGM and remained with them until 1939. Among their early assignments was writing the screenplay for The Thin Man (1934). They were encouraged by director W.S. Van Dyke to use the writing of Dashiell Hammett as a basis only and to concentrate on providing witty exchanges for the principal characters, Nick and Nora Charles (played by William Powell and Myrna Loy). The resulting film was one of the major hits of the year, and the script was considered to show a modern relationship in a realistic manner for the first time.

The couple received Academy Award for Screenplay nominations for The Thin Man, After the Thin Man (1936), Father of the Bride (1950) and Seven Brides for Seven Brothers (1955). They won Writers Guild of America awards for Easter Parade (1949), Father's Little Dividend (1951), Seven Brides for Seven Brothers (1954), and The Diary of Anne Frank (1959), as well as nominations for In the Good Old Summertime (1949), Father of the Bride (1950) and The Long, Long Trailer (1954). They also won a Pulitzer Prize for Drama for their play The Diary of Anne Frank. Some of their other films include: Another Thin Man (1939) and It's a Wonderful Life (1946).

== Personal life ==
Hackett and Goodrich met at Elitch Theatre in 1928 when they were both in the summer stock cast. Goodrich and Hackett remained married until her death.

Muckraking writer Henry Demarest Lloyd was Goodrich's uncle.
