= After the Thin Man =

1936 film by W. S. Van Dyke

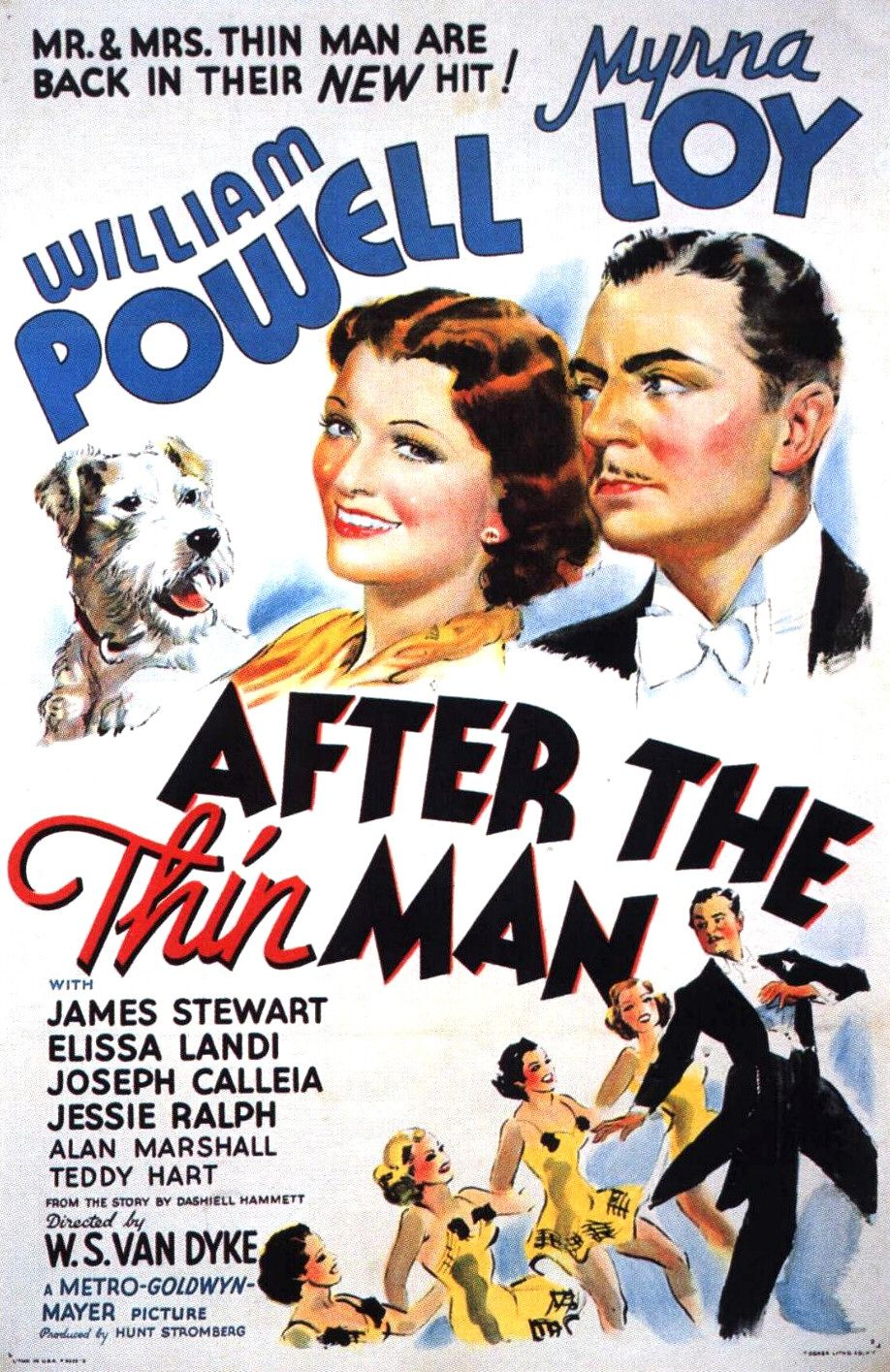
- Theatrical release poster
- Directed by: W. S. Van Dyke
- Screenplay by: Frances Goodrich; Albert Hackett
- Story by: Dashiell Hammett
- Produced by: Hunt Stromberg
- Starring: William Powell; Myrna Loy; James Stewart; Elissa Landi; Joseph Calleia; Jessie Ralph; Alan Marshal; Teddy Hart
- Cinematography: Oliver T. Marsh
- Edited by: Robert J. Kern
- Music by: Herbert Stothart; Edward Ward
- Production company: Metro-Goldwyn-Mayer
- Distributed by: Loew's Inc.
- Release date: December 25, 1936
- Running time: 112 minutes
- Country: United States
- Language: English
- Budget: $673,000 (est.)
- Box office: $3,165,000 (worldwide est.)

After the Thin Man is a 1936 American comedy mystery film directed by W. S. Van Dyke and starring William Powell and Myrna Loy. A sequel to the 1934 feature The Thin Man, the film presents Powell and Loy as Dashiell Hammett's characters Nick and Nora Charles. The film also features James Stewart, Elissa Landi, Joseph Calleia, Jessie Ralph, Alan Marshal, and Teddy Hart.

== Plot ==
On New Year's Eve, after Nick and Nora Charles return from New York City to their home in San Francisco, the couple are invited to dinner with Nora's aristocratic family. Nora's distraught cousin Selma Landis tells Nora that her playboy husband Robert has been missing for three days. Nora's aunt Katherine Forrest, who disapproves of Nick, asks him to quietly investigate Robert's disappearance. David Graham, Selma's former fiancé, informs Nick and Nora that a few days earlier, Robert offered to leave Selma if David paid him $25,000.

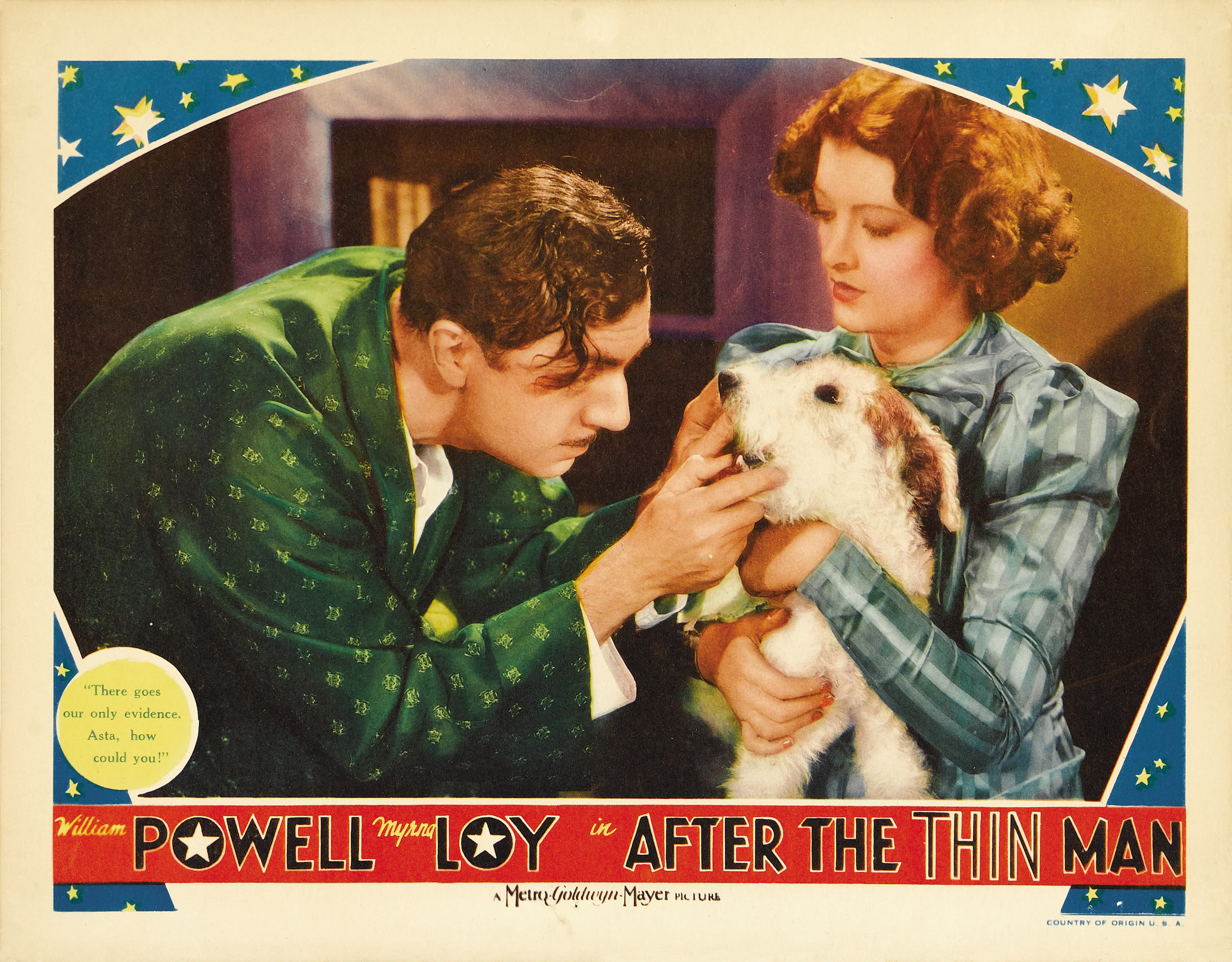
Lobby card for After the Thin Man (1936)

Robert has been at the Lichee Club, a seedy Chinese nightclub, having an affair with Polly, the club's star performer. Polly and one of the club's owners, Dancer, plan to steal the money that David will pay Robert. Polly's brother Phil Byrnes tries to extort money from her, but Dancer throws him out, just as Nick and Nora arrive looking for Robert, who tells the couple that he has no intention of coming back to Selma. Later, David secretly meets with Robert and gives him negotiable bonds.

When Robert briefly returns to the Forrest mansion to retrieve some clothes, Selma follows him with a gun. Robert walks out into the fog and is shot dead. David arrives and finds Selma standing over Robert with a gun in her hand. Lieutenant Abrams considers Selma the prime suspect, and her fragile mental state only reinforces his suspicions. Selma insists that she never fired her gun, but her claim cannot be substantiated as David threw the gun into the bay, thinking she was guilty.

One night, someone throws a rock with a note attached to it through Nick and Nora's window. The note reveals that Phil is an ex-convict and Polly's husband. Abrams shows Nick several checks that Robert gave to Polly, including one for $20,000. Nick compares the signatures and determines that the $20,000 check was forged.

Nick and Abrams find Phil murdered in his hotel room. Nick later discovers that someone named Anderson had bugged Polly's apartment from the apartment above hers. While Nick is upstairs, Dancer enters Polly's apartment. Nick pursues Dancer into the basement, but Dancer shoots at Nick and disappears. Nick then discovers the body of the building's janitor, Pedro. Nora identifies Pedro as her father's former gardener. Abrams says someone tried to call Nick from the building just before Pedro was killed.

Nick has Abrams gather all the suspects in the Anderson apartment. Dancer and Polly confess their plan to use a forged check to steal Robert's money, but each claims to be innocent of murder. David says that he has not seen Pedro in six years but remembers his long white mustache. Nick realizes that David must be lying, having seen a picture of Pedro taken six years before showing that he then had a short dark mustache.

Nick reveals that Anderson is actually David, who killed Robert out of revenge for taking Selma away from him. He rented the upstairs apartment so that he could eavesdrop on Polly's conversations, intending to climb down into her apartment using a makeshift ladder, kill Robert and plant incriminating evidence. Pedro discovered David's contraptions while doing repair works and called Nick. David heard the phone call and killed Pedro. After witnessing David kill Robert outside the Forrest mansion, Phil tried to blackmail David, so David murdered Phil and threw the note through Nick's window as a diversion.

David admits that he had been planning to frame Selma for Robert's murder, as he hated her for leaving him. He draws a gun and threatens to shoot Selma and then himself. Lum Kee, Dancer's partner in the club, flings his hat in David's face, and David is overpowered. This surprises Nora because Nick was responsible for Lum Kee's brother being sent to prison for bank robbery, but Lum Kee admits that he dislikes his brother and likes his brother's girlfriend.

Nick and Nora leave San Francisco by train, accompanied by Selma. Later, alone with Nora, Nick notices that she is knitting a baby's sock and, to his amazement, realizes that she is pregnant.

== Cast ==
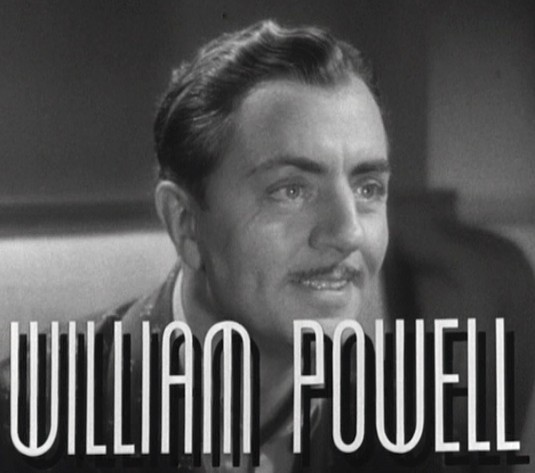

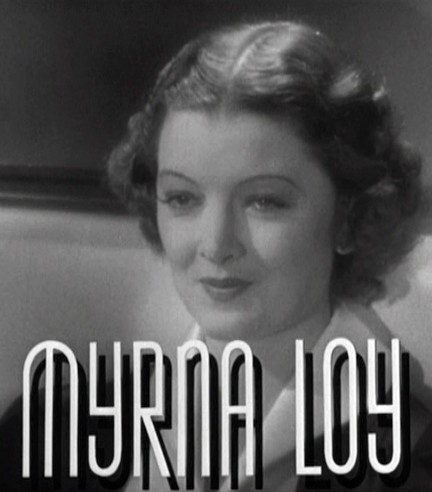

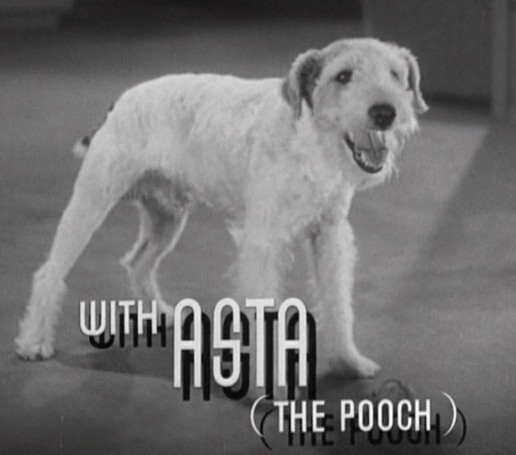

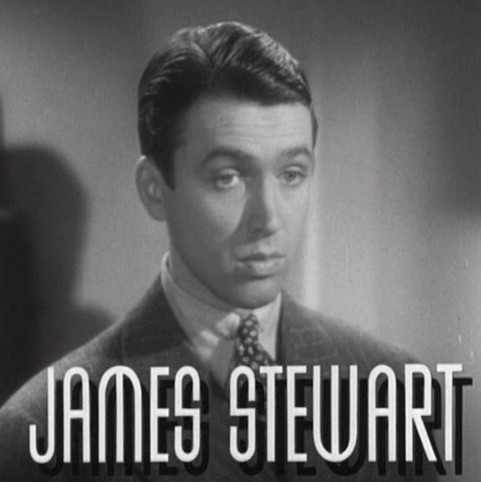

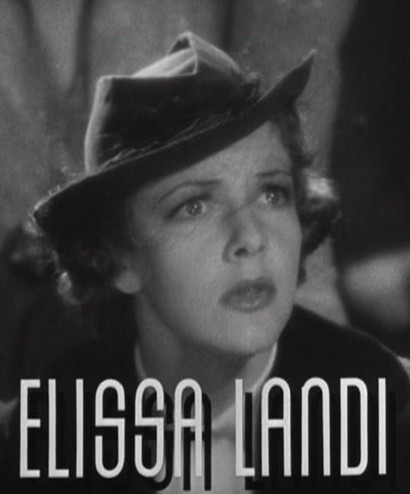

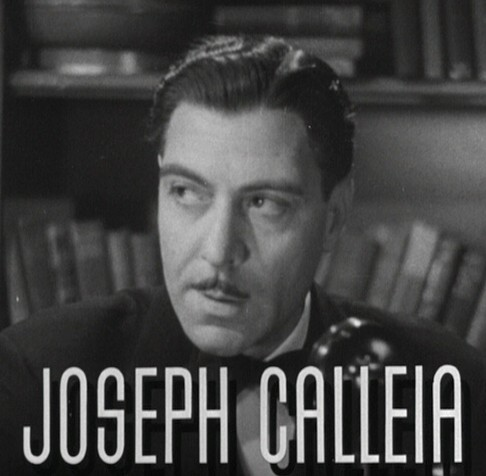

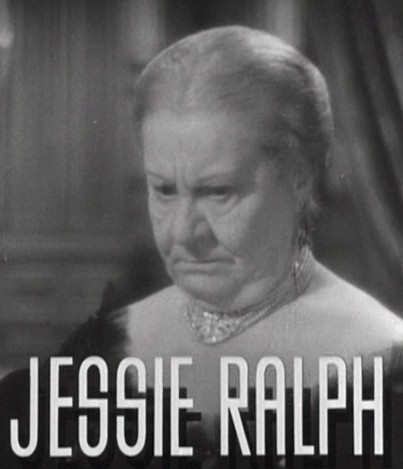
- William Powell as Nick Charles
- Myrna Loy as Nora Charles
- James Stewart as David Graham
- Elissa Landi as Selma Landis
- Joseph Calleia as "Dancer"
- Jessie Ralph as Aunt Katherine Forrest
- Alan Marshal (credited as Alan Marshall) as Robert Landis
- Teddy Hart as Casper
- Sam Levene as Lieutenant Abrams
- Penny Singleton (credited as Dorothy McNulty) as Polly Byrnes
- William Law as Lum Kee
- George Zucco as Dr. Kammer
- Paul Fix as Phil Byrnes
- Skippy as Asta
- Harlan Briggs as Burton Forrest (uncredited)
- Ernie Stanton as thug at Nick's table (uncredited)
- Maude Turner Gordon as Helen (uncredited)
- Tom Ricketts as Henry, the butler (uncredited)
- Zeffie Tilbury as Aunt Lucy (uncredited)
- William Burress as Cousin Lucius (uncredited)
- Esther Howard as the woman at Lichee Club (uncredited)

== Production ==
The film's storyline was written by Dashiell Hammett based on his characters Nick and Nora, but not on a particular novel or short story. Albert Hackett and Frances Goodrich wrote the original screenplay.

The film was the second of six feature films based on the characters of Nick and Nora:

- The Thin Man (1934)
- After the Thin Man (1936)
- Another Thin Man (1939)
- Shadow of the Thin Man (1941)
- The Thin Man Goes Home (1944)
- Song of the Thin Man (1947)

== Reception ==
The film was nominated for an Oscar in 1937 for Best Writing, Screenplay. Review aggregator Rotten Tomatoes lists the film with a score of 96% based on reviews from 27 professional critics, with a rating average of 7.65/10.

After the Thin Man grossed a domestic and foreign total of $3,165,000: $1,992,000 from the U.S. and Canada and $1,173,000 elsewhere. It returned a profit of $1,516,000.

== Radio adaptation ==
An hour-long radio adaptation of After the Thin Man was presented on the CBS Lux Radio Theatre on June 17, 1940. Powell and Loy reprised their roles.

== References in other media ==
The film is referred to in the 1938 American mystery novel The Listening House by Mabel Seeley during an interlude in which the book's protagonist goes to see a film called After the Dark Man.

== Home media ==
After the Thin Man was released on Blu-ray by the Warner Archive Collection on January 26, 2021.
