= Bernice Gordon =

American crossword constructor

Bernice Gordon (January 11, 1914 – January 29, 2015) was an American constructor of crosswords. She created puzzles for many publications after beginning her career in the early 1950s, and holds the record as the oldest contributor to The New York Times crossword puzzle. A 1965 Times puzzle she wrote is credited as the first rebus puzzle, fitting an exclamation point into a single square. She celebrated her 100th birthday in 2014, just a few weeks after the 100th anniversary of the crossword. Her last puzzle was published in the Los Angeles Times on December 2, 2014.

== History of puzzling ==
Having loved doing puzzles as a child, Gordon started creating her own puzzles for fun in the early 1950s, shortly after her first husband died. Soon after, she started submitting them to Margaret Farrar, the first puzzle editor of The New York Times. Despite 6 or 7 quick rejections (due to "Too many abbreviations", unfamiliar words, etc.), her first puzzle was accepted by the Times in 1952, a weekday puzzle for which she was paid $5 or $10. According to current puzzle editor Will Shortz, this was the first of over 150 puzzles of hers that the NYTimes would subsequently print. In 1955, she was assigned the 'Sunday stumper'. This was the first of 9 Sunday puzzles she would author for the Times.

At age 95, she became the oldest known crossword puzzle writer for The New York Times. She subsequently broke her own record by being published in the Times at age 96, 97, 98 99, and again at age 100. Gordon published thousands of puzzles during her 60+ year career, and continued to write new puzzles daily. She called herself a "cruciverbalist," and credited her productivity to chronic insomnia.

== Publishers and editors ==
Newspaper or Publisher	Editor(s)	Years
The New York Times	Will Shortz Eugene T. Maleska; Will Weng; Margaret Farrar	1952–2014
The Philadelphia Inquirer	Herbert Etteson	'80s, '90s
Los Angeles Times		2012, 2013, 2014
Simon & Schuster	John M. Samson	
The Pennsylvania Gazette		2012–2014
The Crosswords Club	Will Weng	
The Universal Crossword	Timothy Parker	
Dell Magazine		
The Wall Street Journal		2008, 2009
Running Press		

== Personal life ==
Gordon was born January 11, 1914, and graduated from the University of Pennsylvania with a Bachelor of Fine Arts degree in 1935. She married Benjamin Lanard, cofounder of commercial realty company Lanard & Axilbund, in 1935. They had two sons, Ben and Bruce Lanard. Gordon was widowed in 1947, then remarried and added a daughter, Amanda, to the family.

In addition to writing puzzles, Gordon was an abstract painter and a needlepoint artist, finding inspiration in the places she traveled to, from her European honeymoon to Spain, Russia, Singapore, China, India, South America, and her favorite country, Egypt. She used to live in Philadelphia's Rittenhouse Square. In January 2014, The Rittenhouse Square Flower Market for Children's Charities (RSFMCC) recognized its 100th-year anniversary with a joint birthday bash also celebrating Gordon's 100th birthday. Times puzzle editor Will Shortz attended Gordon's 100th birthday party in Philadelphia. Gordon had an extensive personal library of reference books. On January 29, 2015, Gordon died of heart failure at the age of 101.

== Notable puzzles ==
=== Use of symbols and signs ===
On Sunday, May 30, 1965, Gordon made puzzle history by introducing a convention-busting puzzle with answers including 'COWBOYS&INDIANS', 'CARMEN MIR&A', and 'SC&INAVIA', using ampersand signs in place of letters. This is now a common convention in crossword puzzles. Margaret Farrar initially rejected the puzzle with ten ampersands in it, calling it "trickery", but six months later decided to print it. The puzzle response was overwhelming, both evoking praise for originality, and anger from those who felt tricked. Gordon was also the first to include symbols in her answers, including answers like JIMMY*TER and BI*BONATE, where * had to be substituted for the letters 'CAR'.

=== Happy Hooker ===
Gordon once created an X-rated puzzle for the Happy Hooker, aka Xaviera Hollander, a writer and former call girl with a bestselling memoir in the 1970s. Hollander became a family friend after getting to know Gordon's son, Ben Lanard, in Europe. Hollander had to provide the clues and dirty words for Gordon to incorporate.

== Collaborations ==
=== Norman Wizer ===
Norman S. Wizer of Malvern, Pennsylvania (deceased August 12, 2013), also a veteran crossword puzzle writer, was one of Gordon's closest friends. The two collaborated often and co-authored puzzles in multiple publications, winning a best puzzle award for their contribution to the Mega Crossword Puzzle Book from Simon & Schuster.

=== David Steinberg ===
David Steinberg, who at 14 was the second youngest puzzle constructor to be printed in The New York Times, paired up with Gordon, then the oldest living Times constructor, on June 26, 2013, to create an age difference-themed puzzle. At the time the puzzle was published, Steinberg was 16, Gordon was 99. Will Shortz introduced Steinberg to Gordon initially. They collaborated remotely and exchanged more than 70 emails.

== Awards and recognition ==
- As of 2013, she was the oldest living contributor to The New York Times, having had her most recent puzzle published at age 100
- Lifetime achievement prize and annual constructor award named after her by Universal Crosswords editor Timothy Parker, 2000
- Recognized as one of only a few constructors to contribute puzzles to The New York Times for over 50 years
- Best Puzzle Award for puzzle in Simon & Schuster's Mega Crossword Puzzle Book, co-authored with Norman Wizer
- Margaret Award for puzzle in Simon & Schuster's Series 217
- $1000 annual prize in her name by Masterpuzzles for outstanding work appearing on computers
- The Rittenhouse Square Flower Market for Children's Charities recognized its 100th-year celebration with a joint birthday bash celebrating Gordon's 100th birthday in January 2014.
- Oldest living "New York Times" crossword constructor at age 95
- Oldest living "New York Times" crossword constructor at age 96
- Oldest living "New York Times" crossword constructor at age 97

== Online puzzles ==
- "2013 Puzzle by Bernice Gordon". The Pennsylvania Gazette. September 13, 2013. Archived from the original on September 13, 2013.
- May 2013. Pennsylvania Gazette, 2013 Puzzle by Bernice Gordon
- "2012 Puzzle by Bernice Gordon". The Pennsylvania Gazette. November 12, 2012. Archived from the original on January 11, 2014.
- Jun 26, 2013, The New York Times, 2013 Puzzle by Bernice Gordon & David Steinberg
- Dec. 23, 1982 The Courier, 1982 Puzzle by Bernice Gordon
- "Simon & Schuster Mega Crossword Puzzle Book #8", 2010 Puzzle by Bernice Gordon and Norman Wizer

== Notes ==
1. Sarah Smith (June 26, 2013). Puzzling collaboration has Phila. connection, The Philadelphia Inquirer. Retrieved December 26, 2013.
2. Peter Mucha (October 4, 2009). At 95, Bernice Gordon is still master of the crossword puzzle, The Philadelphia Inquirer (syndicated by Deseret News). Retrieved October 4, 2013.
3. Bill Hogan (Nov 2013). Crosswords Are No Problem for Puzzle Maker Bernice Gordon, AARP. Retrieved January 11, 2015.
4. Jim Horne (December 21, 2010). "Interview with Will Shortz", Wordplay: The Crossword Blog of The New York Times. Retrieved December 26, 2013.
5. Will Shortz (December 30, 2011). "The Year in Puzzles, Part 2: The Puzzle Master’s Turn", Wordplay: The Crossword Blog of The New York Times. Retrieved December 26, 2013.
6. Patrick Merrell (September 19, 2010). "Monday: Longevity", Wordplay: The Crossword Blog of The New York Times. Retrieved December 26, 2013.
