= Harold T. Bers =

American crossword puzzle writer (1913–1961)

- Bers as an NYU student, 1933
- Born: December 20, 1913; New York City, US
- Died: October 13, 1961 (aged 47); Armonk, New York, US
- Education: New York University
- Occupations: Crossword constructor Advertising executive
- Known for: Inventor of the themed crossword puzzle

Harold Theodore Bers (December 20, 1913 – October 13, 1961) was an American advertising executive, poet, and crossword puzzle constructor. He is credited with inventing the themed crossword puzzle while making puzzles for The New York Times.

== Early life and advertising career ==
Harold Bers was born and raised in New York City, the son of a Latvian immigrant. He attended New York University, graduating in 1933. During World War II, he served with the Office of War Information as an editor, stationed in Europe.

He spent his adult life in the advertising business, holding positions ranging from copywriter to executive at BBDO, William Esty Co., Young & Rubicam, McCann-Erickson, Bachenheimer, Dundes & Frank, Warwick & Legler, and Lennen & Newell. Among the clients he wrote ad copy for were the cigarette companies Lorrilard and R.J. Reynolds' Camel brand.

== Crossword constructing ==
Bers is known to have begun constructing crosswords puzzles as early as 1939, when a puzzle of his appears in the Montreal Gazette. His early puzzles also appeared in The Atlanta Constitution, The Washington Post, and the New York Herald-Tribune, among others.

His first puzzle in The New York Times appeared on January 26, 1947. Bers is credited with 138 New York Times crossword puzzles published between 1947 and 1961, including 71 Sunday puzzles. At the time of death in 1961, he was the fourth-most frequent creator of Times puzzles, trailing only Eugene T. Maleska, Jack Luzzatto, and Thomas Meekin.

Maleska, editor of The New York Times crossword puzzle from 1977 to 1993, credited Bers as a leader of the "creative young constructors" who led a "minor revolution" in crosswords by adding humor and wordplay to clues.

Bers' January 19, 1958 Times puzzle, considered the first themed crossword puzzle.

Bers is credited with the invention of the themed crossword puzzle — a puzzle in which an overarching connection between multiple answers is revealed during its completion. At the time, it was often called an "inner-clue puzzle." The effect, as one crossword historian put it, was to open "up many new possibilities, as definitions were replaced with more whimsical clues. Solvers were forced to think in a new way."

One early example was his January 19, 1958 puzzle, titled "Catalogue," which featured more than 20 cat-related clues and answers (such as CATACOMBS, THECATSMEOW, CATNAPPED, WILDCATTERS, and KRAZYKAT). A 1959 puzzle headlined "Full of Flavor" included NUTMEGSTATE, BASILOCONNOR, VINEGARJOE, ROSEMARYLANE, MUSTARDSEED, and MAKINGAMINT. A 1960 puzzle titled "A Few Footnotes" was stuffed with footwear-related answers (including WATERMOCCASIN, BOOTHILL, IRISHBROGUE, OXFORDSHIRE, and BICYCLEPUMP).

Margaret Farrar, the Times crossword puzzle's first editor from 1942 to 1968, embraced Bers' idea, calling it an "opportunity to add some puzzlement to the crossword by the use of puns or phrasing." One historian described her promotion of Bers' themed puzzles as "arguably Farrar's most consequential contribution to crossword culture."

Bers is considered one of the formative figures in the crossword puzzle's development. In 1989, a group of crossword figures gathered to pick members of the inaugural class of a new Crossword Puzzle Hall of Fame. Bers was selected as a member, alongside Arthur Wynne, Margaret Farrar, F. Gregory Hartswick, Prosper Buranelli, Anne Fox, Jack Luzzatto, and Jules Arensberg. (The hall of fame never opened due to the death of its chief sponsor.)

== Personal life ==
Along with his crosswords, Bers wrote light verse and comedic pieces for the popular press. Beginning in 1946, he contributed a regular poem to Holiday magazine as its "topical bard." He also contributed poems to The New Yorker.

He was also involved in community theater and Democratic Party politics, serving as a member of the city committee of North Castle, New York.

Bers died at age 47 of a heart attack at his Armonk, New York home on October 13, 1961, leaving a wife and two children.
