= David Steinberg (crossword editor) =

American crossword editor (born 1996)

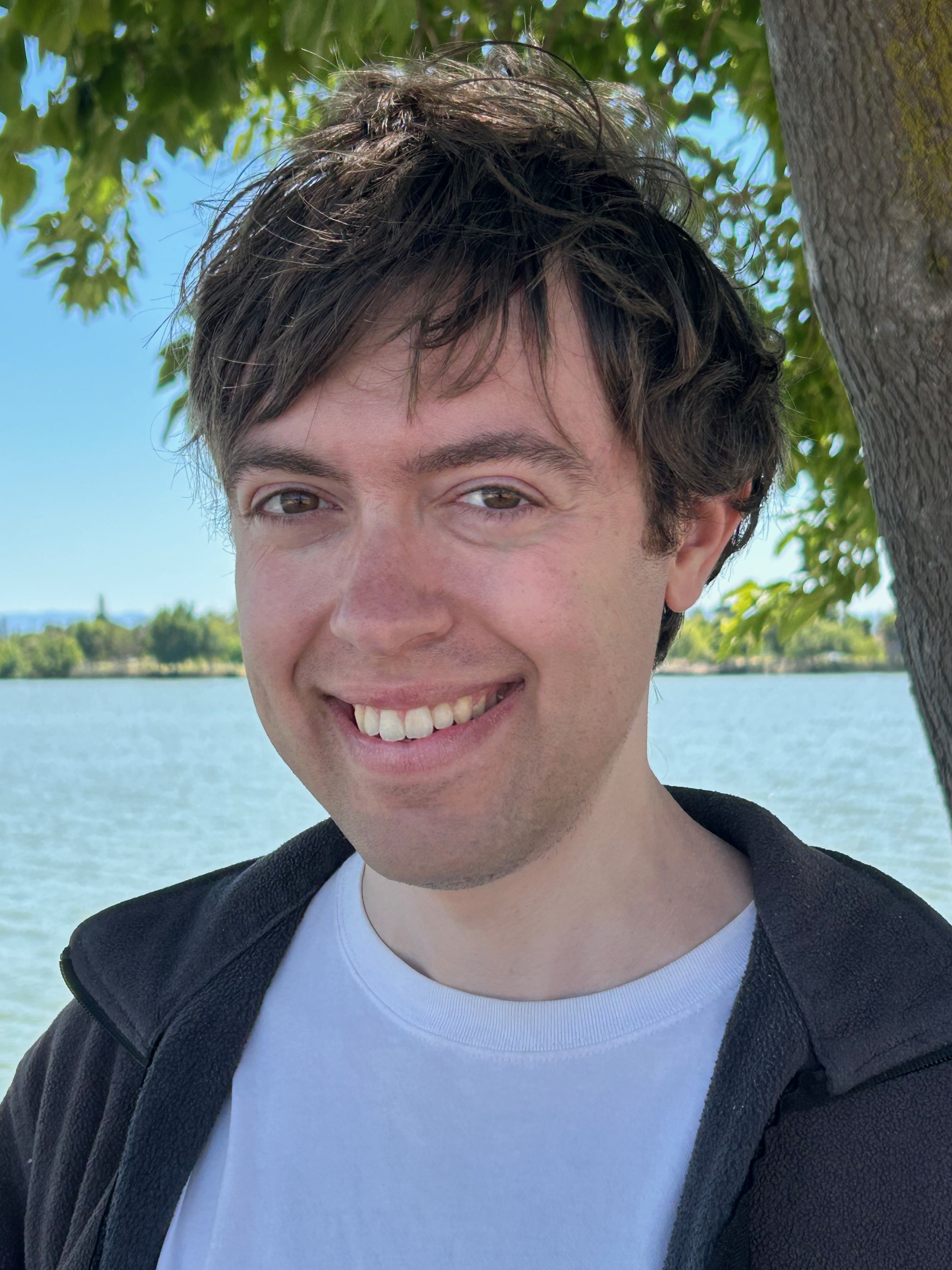
- Steinberg in 2025
- Born: 1996 (age 29–30); Philadelphia, Pennsylvania, U.S.
- Occupations: Crossword constructor and editor

David Steinberg (born 1996) is an American crossword constructor and editor who is currently the editor of the Universal Crossword, a daily puzzle published by Andrews McMeel Syndication. At 14, he became the then second-youngest published constructor in the New York Times, and at 15, the youngest published constructor in the Los Angeles Times and the youngest known crossword editor ever for a major newspaper (Orange County Register).

== Early life and education ==
Steinberg was born in Philadelphia, Pennsylvania, and raised in California and Washington. In middle school, he was introduced to The New York Times crossword puzzle by his parents and, after seeing Merl Reagle build a puzzle in the movie Wordplay, began constructing. He attended Turtle Rock Elementary School in Irvine, California, the Lakeside School in Seattle, and Palos Verdes Peninsula High School. He attended Stanford University.

== Puzzle career ==
Steinberg's first crossword publication was in The New York Times on June 16, 2011. Since then he has published nearly 500 puzzles in The New York Times, the Los Angeles Times, The Wall Street Journal, The Chronicle of Higher Education, Newsday, Orange County Register, Fireball Crosswords, Daily Celebrity Crossword, the American Values Club Crossword, BuzzFeed, 10-4 Magazine, The Jerusalem Post, and books. One of his puzzles was selected for Twenty Under Thirty, and another appeared in The American Red Crossword Book.

An e-book with 25 color-themed crosswords by Steinberg, Chromatics, was published in September 2012. Two months later, he was made crossword editor of the Orange County Register's 24 weekly associated newspapers. This puzzle feature expanded into the Riverside County Press-Enterprise and the now-defunct Los Angeles Register associated newspapers.

In 2013, Steinberg was the most prolific New York Times constructor, published a total of 15 times that year.

Juicy Crosswords, a book containing crosswords Steinberg edited for the Orange County Register, was published by Sterling Publishing in 2016.

In October 2017, Steinberg became editor of The Puzzle Society Crossword, a daily nationally syndicated feature published by Andrews McMeel Universal.

In December 2018, he was named editor of the Universal Crossword, a daily and Sunday internationally syndicated puzzle published by Andrews McMeel Universal.

In September 2019, he became Puzzles and Games Editor at Andrews McMeel Universal, where he continued to edit the Universal Crossword; he was promoted to Lead Puzzle Editor in 2023 and, in 2024, to Editorial Manager, Puzzles, where he edits the Universal Crossword, oversees a team of puzzle editors, and develops playable puzzle and game prototypes.

== Diversity ==
Steinberg has worked to increase the diversity of puzzle creators and the content of puzzles. His project, Universal Crossword Equal Representation Project, reached out to novice constructors and paired them with seasoned constructors to create a publishable puzzle.

Age diversity is also an issue in the crossword constructor community. Steinberg is interested in the history of crosswords, and in June 2013, Steinberg collaborated with veteran New York Times constructor Bernice Gordon on a puzzle that was historic because of their 83-year age difference. At 99, Gordon was the oldest currently publishing New York Times crossword constructor; at 16, Steinberg was the youngest.

== Archive of New York Times crosswords ==
In June 2012, he founded the Pre-Shortzian Puzzle Project, a collaborative effort to build a digitized, fully analyzable database of The New York Times crossword puzzles published before Will Shortz became editor. Steinberg directed the project, which was an outgrowth of a project he conducted for a science research course while a freshman in high school, for which he recruited dozens of his fellow students to help with the digitization project.

== Puzzle books ==
- Chromatics: Colorful Crosswords by David Steinberg. Puzzazz. 2012.
- Juicy Crosswords. Sterling Publishing. 2016.
