= Crosswordese =

Terms found more frequently in crosswords

Crosswordese is the group of words frequently found in US crossword puzzles but seldom found in everyday conversation. The words are usually short, three to five letters, with letter combinations which crossword constructors find useful in the creation of crossword puzzles, such as words that start or end with vowels (or both), abbreviations consisting entirely of consonants, unusual combinations of letters, and words consisting almost entirely of frequently used letters. Such words are needed in almost every puzzle to some extent. Too much crosswordese in a crossword puzzle is frowned upon by crossword-makers and crossword enthusiasts.

Knowing the language of "crosswordese" is helpful to constructors and solvers alike. According to Marc Romano, "to do well solving crosswords, you absolutely need to keep a running mental list of 'crosswordese', the set of recurring words that constructors reach for whenever they are heading for trouble in a particular section of the grid".

The popularity of individual words and names of crosswordese, and the way they are clued, changes over time. For instance, ITO was occasionally clued in the 1980s and 1990s in reference to dancer Michio Itō and actor Robert Ito, then boomed in the late 1990s and 2000s when judge Lance Ito was a household name, and has since fallen somewhat, and when it appears today, the clue typically references figure skater Midori Ito or uses the partial phrase "I to" (as in ["How was ___ know?"]).

== List of crosswordese ==
Portions of phrases are occasionally used as fill in the blank clues. For instance, "Et tu, Brute?" might appear in a puzzle's clue sheet as "_____, Brute?"

=== Architecture ===
- APSE – semicircular church recess
- ELL – type of extension to a building; a measure for cloth
- DORIC and IONIC orders – referring to ancient architecture most readily identifiable by the style of support columns
- NAVE – the middle section of a church
- OGEE – S-shaped curve often seen in Gothic arches
- STOA – covered walkway of ancient Greece

=== Biblical references ===
- CAIN and ABEL – sons of Adam and Eve in Genesis 4:1–16
- ENOS – first-born son of Seth
- ESAU – older twin son of Isaac
- EDEN – biblical paradise described in Genesis 2–3 and Ezekiel 28

=== Brand and trade names ===
- AFTA – Gillette aftershave brand
- ATRA – Gillette safety razor brand
- OXO – kitchen utensil brand
- STP – motor oil additive brand
- OREO – snack item known as "Milk's favorite cookie". In the Maleska era, to avoid brand names in the puzzle, it was invariably clued as [Mountain: Comb. form].

=== Computers and the Internet ===
- LAN – local area network, network of computers in a limited area
- HTML – the standard language for documents designed to be displayed in a web browser

=== Currency and business ===
- LEK – official currency of Albania
- LEV – former currency of Bulgaria
- LIRA (plural LIRE) – official currency of Turkey; former currency of Italy
- OPEC – Organization of the Petroleum Exporting Countries
- PESO – official currency of many countries, including Mexico

=== Directions ===
A 16-point compass rose showing the 16 standard compass directions

Many puzzles ask for the direction from one place to another. These directions always fall between the standard octaval compass points—i.e., North (N – 0° or 360°), Northeast (NE – 45°), East (E – 90°), etc.

The directions asked for on clue sheets are usually approximations. Starting at north and going clockwise, the directions are:

- NNE = North-northeast (22.5°)
- ENE = East-northeast (67.5°)
- ESE = East-southeast (112.5°)
- SSE = South-southeast (157.5°)
- SSW = South-southwest (202.5°)
- WSW = West-southwest (247.5°)
- WNW = West-northwest (292.5°)
- NNW = North-northwest (337.5°)

=== Fictional characters ===
- ASTA – dog of Nick and Nora Charles in The Thin Man movies
- AHAB – protagonist of Melville's Moby-Dick
- ELSA – princess from the 2013 film Frozen. Also Elsa the lioness or Elsa von Brabant.
- ENOLA – Enola Holmes from the mystery series of the same name
- ENT – treelike species in Middle-earth
- ESMÉ – title character of J. D. Salinger's short story "For Esmé—with Love and Squalor"
- EWOK – furry species in the Star Wars universe
- IAGO – Iago, villain of Shakespeare's Othello; or Iago, parrot in Disney's Aladdin
- ISOLDE – medieval character depicted in Wagner's Tristan und Isolde
- ILSA – Ilsa Lund, Ingrid Bergman's character in Casablanca
- ODIE – dog in the comic strip Garfield
- OPIE – Ron Howard's character on The Andy Griffith Show
- ORC – goblinlike species in Middle-earth
- SMEE – Captain Hook's assistant in Peter Pan
- TOTO – Dorothy's dog in The Wizard of Oz

=== Food and drink ===
- AIOLI – condiment similar to mayonnaise, usually with garlic
- ALOO – Potato, in Hindi
- GROG – alcoholic beverage made of heated low-alcohol beer, rum and a variety of flavorings such as lemon or lime juice, cinnamon and sugar
- MAHI – Persian (borrowed into Hindi–Urdu) for fish. More often refers to mahi-mahi
- NEHI – line of fruit-flavored soft drinks from the Royal Crown Company. Grape Nehi was the favorite drink of Radar O'Reilly on the TV series M*A*S*H
- MSG – monosodium glutamate, flavor enhancer; also sometimes clued as an abbreviation for "message" or Madison Square Garden
- OLEO – used as a synonym for margarine
- ORT – scrap of leftover food
- PHO – Vietnamese soup
- POI – mashed taro root dish

=== Geography ===
==== Proper names ====
- AARE (or AAR) – tributary of the Rhine in Switzerland
- ACCRA – capital of Ghana
- ADAK – westerly island of the Aleutian Islands chain
- AGRA – ancient city of India that is the home of the Taj Mahal
- AMES – city of Iowa that is the home of Iowa State University
- APIA – capital of Samoa
- ARAL – lake of Central Asia that has largely dried up by the 2010s
- ARLES – city of southern France where van Gogh painted
- ARNO – river of Italy
- ASTI – city of Italy known for its sparkling wines
- ATTU – westernmost island of the Aleutian Islands chain
- CAEN – World War II battle site in Normandy
- EBRO – river of Spain
- EDER – river of Germany
- ELBE – river of Czechia and Germany
- ELBA – Mediterranean island that was the site of Napoleon's first exile
- ENID – city of Oklahoma
- ERIE – one of the Great Lakes or its namesake city in Pennsylvania
- ESSEN – city of Germany
- IWO – Iwo Jima, World War II battle site in Japan
- NEVA – river of Russia
- ODESSA – city of Ukraine
- OISE – river of France and Belgium
- OJAI – city in southern California
- OMAHA – largest city of Nebraska
- OREM – city near Provo, Utah
- OSLO – capital of Norway
- OUSE – river of Yorkshire, England
- RENO – city of Nevada
- RIGA – capital of Latvia
- SOHO – neighborhood in London (Soho) or neighborhood in New York City (SoHo)
- ST. LO – Saint-Lô, World War II battle site in Normandy
- URAL – river and mountain range of Russia
- YSER – river of France and Belgium

==== General terms ====
- ADIT - mine entrance
- ARÊTE – thin ridge of rock that formed by glaciers
- MESA – high-elevation area of rock that stands out from its surroundings
- TOR – rock outcrop formed by weathering

=== Interjections ===
- AHEM – used to represent the noise made when clearing the throat
- EGAD – used to express surprise (dated)
- HAHA – used to represent laughter
- HMM – used to express uncertainty
- PHEW – used to express relief
- PSST – used to attract someone's attention
- WHOA – used to express surprise
- WOWEE (or WOWIE) – used to express astonishment
- YEA – used as an affirmative response

=== Jargon and slang ===
- ALEE – in nautical language, toward the side opposite the wind
- ARO – clipping of aromantic
- TEC – old slang for a detective

=== Language ===
Because of crossword rules that restrict the usage of two-letter words, only entries of three or more letters have been listed.

	A	B	C	D	E	F	G	H	I	J	K	L	M
Singular	aye	bee	cee	dee	n/a	eff	gee	aitch	n/a	jay	kay	ell	n/a
Plural	ayes	bees	cees	dees	n/a	efs/effs	gees	aitches	n/a	jays	kays	els/ells	ems
	N	O	P	Q	R	S	T	U	V	W	X	Y	Z
Singular	n/a	n/a	pee	cue	n/a	ess	tee	n/a	vee	double-u	n/a	wye	zee/zed
Plural	ens	ohs	pees	cues	ars	esses	tees	n/a	vees	double-us	exs/exes/xes	wyes	zees/zeds

Often these letters are clued as puns, e.g. the clue [Puzzle center?] for ZEES, referring to the two Zs in the center of the word "puzzle".

The "zed" spelling of Z is often indicated by a reference to a Commonwealth country, where that is the standard pronunciation (e.g. [British puzzle center?] for ZEDS).

Greek letters often appear as well, such as ETA.

=== Manmade items ===
- AWL – pointed tool used for punching holes in leather
- ETUI – small purse often used to hold sewing supplies
- EWER – decorative pitcher
- OBI – sash worn with a kimono
- OLIO – miscellaneous mixture of elements, especially artistic works, musical pieces, writing, or food
- OLLA – ceramic stew pot
- ULU – knife traditionally used by Yup'ik, Inuit, and Aleut women

=== Mathematics ===
- RADII – plural of radius, straight line from the centre of a circle to its circumference

=== Music ===
- ADAGIO – tempo marking that means "play slowly"
- A DUE – musical direction that means "for two"
- A FLAT (or B FLAT, etc.)
- A MAJOR (or A MINOR, B MAJOR, etc.)
- ARCO – musical direction that means "with the bow"
- ARIA – solo in an opera
- ASSAI – musical direction that means "very"
- A TEMPO – musical direction that means "resume (original) speed"
- LARGO – tempo marking that means "play slowly"
- LEGATO – musical direction that means "play smooth and connected"
- LENTO – tempo marking that means "play very slowly"
- POCO – musical direction modifier that means "somewhat" (literally "a little")
- RIT – abbreviation for "ritardando"
- STAC – abbreviation for "staccato"
- TACET – musical direction to rest

=== Names ===
- AGEE – James Agee, American novelist and critic
- ALDA – Alan Alda, American actor who starred in M*A*S*H (1972–1983)
- ALI – Various people, including Muhammad Ali and Ali Baba
- ALOU – Alou family of American baseball players (Felipe, Matty, Jesús, and Moisés)
- ANKA – Paul Anka, Canadian-American singer, songwriter and actor
- AOKI and ISAO – Isao Aoki, Japanese golfer
- ARIE – Arie Luyendyk, Dutch race car driver; or India Arie, American singer
- ARLO – Arlo Guthrie, American folk singer
- AROD – Alex Rodriguez ("A-Rod"), American baseball player
- ARP – Jean Arp, German Dadaist sculptor
- ASCH – Sholem Asch, Polish-American writer in the Yiddish language
- ASHE – Arthur Ashe, American tennis player
- ASNER – Ed Asner, American actor who played Lou Grant
- AUEL – Jean M. Auel, American author of the best-selling Earth's Children series
- AYN – Ayn Rand, American writer and philosopher
- BAER – Max Baer, American boxer
- BARA – Theda Bara, American silent film actress
- CID – El Cid, Castilian soldier of the 11th century
- DENG – Deng Xiaoping, leader of China in the 1980s
- EDA – Eda LeShan, American psychologist and childcare expert
- EDD – Edd Roush, American baseball player
- EDIE – Edie Adams; Edie Falco, American actress who starred on The Sopranos (1999–2007)
- EERO – Eero Saarinen, Finnish-American architect
- ELBA – Idris Elba, English actor
- ELI – Various people, including American football quarterback Eli Manning
- ELIA – pen name for Charles Lamb; Elia Kazan, Greek-born American film and theater director
- ELIE – Elie Wiesel, Holocaust survivor and author of Night (1960)
- ELKE – Elke Sommer, German actress
- ELLA – Ella Fitzgerald, American jazz singer
- ELS – Ernie Els, South African golfer (sometimes refers to the "El" trains of Chicago)
- EMIL – Emil Jannings, winner of the first Academy Award for Best Actor
- ENO – Brian Eno, English musician and record producer
- ENYA – Enya, Irish singer of New Age music
- ERIQ – Eriq La Salle, American actor who starred on ER
- ERLE – Erle Stanley Gardner, American detective author who created Perry Mason
- ERNO – Ernő Rubik, inventor of the Rubik's Cube
- ERROL – Errol Flynn, American actor who played swashbucklers
- ERTE – Erté, Russian-born French graphics and costume designer in the Art Deco style
- ESAI – Esai Morales, American actor of Puerto Rican descent
- ETTA – Etta James, American blues and R&B singer; American singer Etta Jones
- EVERT – Chris Evert, American tennis player
- EWAN – Ewan McGregor, Scottish actor
- EZIO – Ezio Pinza, Italian opera singer
- GENA – Gena Rowlands, American actress
- GERE – Richard Gere, American actor
- GRAF – Steffi Graf, German tennis player
- ILIE – Ilie Năstase, Romanian tennis player
- IM PEI (or just PEI) – I. M. Pei, Chinese-American architect
- INGE – William Inge, American playwright
- ISAK – Isak Dinesen, Danish author
- ISSA – Issa Rae, American actress and writer
- ITALO – Italo Calvino, Italian author
- LON – Lon Chaney, American actor in silent horror films
- MAO – Mao Zedong, first chairman of communist China
- MIRA – Mira Sorvino, American actress
- NERO – Nero, Roman emperor
- NIA – Various people, including American actresses Nia Long, Nia Peeples, and Nia Vardalos
- NIN – Anaïs Nin, French-born diarist and writer of erotica; ANAIS
- ONO – Yoko Ono, Japanese artist and singer
- ORR – Bobby Orr, Canadian ice hockey player
- OTT – Mel Ott, American baseball player
- PELE – Pelé, Brazilian soccer player
- POLA – Pola Negri, Polish silent film actress
- RAE – Various people, including Charlotte Rae, explorer John Rae, Issa Rae, Norma Rae, Corinne Bailey Rae, and Carly Rae Jepsen
- REA – Stephen Rea, Irish actor who starred in The Crying Game (1992)
- SELA – Sela Ward, American actress
- SELES – Monica Seles, Swiss tennis player
- SOSA – Sammy Sosa, Dominican-American baseball player
- TATI – Jacques Tati, French mime and filmmaker
- TERI – Various people, including American actresses Teri Garr, Teri Hatcher, and Teri Polo
- TRIS – Tris Speaker, American baseball player
- UMA – Uma Thurman, American actress who starred in Pulp Fiction (1994) and Kill Bill (2003)
- U NU – U Nu, first prime minister of Burma
- UTA – Uta Hagen, American actress and acting teacher
- URI – Uri Geller, Israeli magician
- URIS – Leon Uris, American author
- YAO – Yao Ming, Chinese basketball player
- YMA – Yma Sumac, Peruvian singer
- YUL – Yul Brynner, Russian-born American actor who starred in The King and I

=== Nature ===
- ACAI – Amazonian palm fruit
- AERIE – high nest of a bird of prey
- AGAVE – spiky succulent plant of the desert used to make tequila
- ALOE – succulent plant. Often refers to Aloe vera, a common cosmetic ingredient and sunburn-relieving gel
- ANIL – plant used to make indigo dye
- ASH – common tree
- ASP – Egyptian snake
- ASTER – flower whose name means "star"
- AUK – common seabird
- AWN – bristle on some grasses
- BOA – type of snake
- BOSC – type of pear
- CALLA – kind of lily
- EFT – juvenile phase of the newt
- EIDER – kind of duck used for their down feathers
- ELAND – African antelope
- ELK – large deer
- EMU – large flightless bird of Australia
- ERNE (or ERN) – sea eagle
- GNU – another name for the wildebeest
- IBEX – goat living in mountains
- IBIS – wading bird that was venerated in ancient Egypt
- IRIS – common flower
- KUDU – kind of antelope
- MOA – extinct bird of New Zealand
- NENE – goose endemic to Hawaii (and its state bird)
- OCA – tuber of South America
- OKAPI – relative of the giraffe
- OKRA – pod vegetable used in gumbo
- ORCA – another name for the killer whale
- RHEA – large flightless bird of South America (sometimes refers to Rhea Perlman or the goddess Rhea)
- SEDGE – family of grassy marsh plants
- SEGO – kind of lily (state flower of Utah)
- SEPAL – flower part that supports the petals
- SLOE – fruit plant used to make a type of gin
- SMEW – kind of duck
- TARO – root vegetable used in poi
- TERN – common seabird
- TIT – common bird related to the chickadee
- TSETSE – disease-carrying insect of Africa (TSE is sometimes clued as [half an African fly])
- UDO – Japanese herb
- UGLI – Jamaican citrus fruit

=== Non-English words ===
- À MOI and À TOI – (French) "mine" and "yours" respectively
- AMI or AMIE – (French) "friend"
- ANO (more properly AÑO; the tilde is usually ignored) – (Spanish) "year"
- AVEC – (French) "with"
- BESO – (Spanish) "kiss"
- EAU (plural: EAUX) – (French) "water"
- ERSE – (Scottish Gaelic)
- ESA and ESO – (Spanish) feminine and masculine pronouns
- ESTA and ESTO – (Spanish) feminine and masculine pronouns
- ET TU – "Et tu, Brute?", (Latin) the alleged last words spoken by Julius Caesar after being stabbed by his friend Brutus
- ÉTAT – (French) "state", as in "coup d'état"
- ÉTÉ – (French) "summer"
- ÊTRE – (French) "to be", as in "raison d'être"
- FRAU – (German) "woman", "wife" or "Mrs."
- HERR – (German) "Mister (Mr.)"
- HOC – ad hoc, (Latin) meaning "pertaining to a specific problem"
- ICI – (French) "here"
- IRAE – "Dies irae" (Latin) "Day of Wrath", medieval hymn used in the Roman Catholic Requiem Mass
- ÎLE – (French) "island", as in "Île-de-France"
- MÁS – (Spanish) "more"
- MES – (French) "my"; Spanish for "month"
- MLLE and MME – French abbreviations for "Mademoiselle" and "Madame" respectively
- ORO – (Spanish) "gold"
- REATA – (Spanish) "lasso"
- ROI – (French) "king"
- SEL – (French) "salt"
- SES – (French) possessive plural adjective, "its".
- SRA and SRTA – (Spanish) abbreviations for "señora" and "señorita" respectively
- STE – (French) abbreviation for "sainte", as in Sault Ste. Marie
- TES – (French) possessive plural adjective, "your".
- TÊTE – (French) "head", as in "tête-à-tête"
- TÍA and TÍO – (Spanish) "aunt" and "uncle" respectively
- UNE – (French) Feminine singular indefinite article. Equivalent to "a" or "an" in English.
- VENI, VIDI, VICI – (Latin) phrase spoken by Julius Caesar meaning "I came, I saw, I conquered"

=== Poetic phrases and terms ===
- E'EN – contraction of "even"
- E'ER – poetic contraction of "ever"
- ERE – poetic synonym of "before"
- ERIN – poetic name for Ireland
- O'ER – contraction of "over"

=== Prefixes ===
- AERO- – relating to flight and air
- PYRO- – relating to fire and heat

=== Suffixes ===
- -ASE – a suffix used to form the names of enzymes
- -ESE – a suffix used to indicate a language or ethnicity
- -ISM – indicating a belief or principle
- -IST – indicating an adherent to a belief or principle
- -ITE – a suffix with several meanings, including a faithful follower of a certain person, a mineral, and a native of a certain place
- -OSE – a suffix in chemistry indicating sugar or "full of"
- -ULE – a suffix meaning small

=== Religion and mythology ===
- AJAX – Greek hero (or Ajax, cleaning brand)
- AMUN-RA (also AMON-RA or AMEN-RA)
- ARES – Greek god of war, one of the twelve Olympians
- EID – Eid al-Fitr or Eid al-Adha, Islamic holidays (literally Arabic for "festival")
- EOS – Greek goddess of the dawn, sister of Helios (or Canon EOS cameras)
- ERATO – Greek muse of poetry
- EROS – Greek god of love
- HAJJ – the pilgrimage every faithful Muslim is obliged to perform; one of the Five Pillars of Islam. Sometimes spelled HADJ.
- HERA – Greek goddess, sister and wife of Zeus
- LEDA – queen in Greek mythology, part of "Leda and the Swan"
- MEDEA – Greek figure who helped Jason
- NIOBE – weeping Greek figure
- NOEL – Christmas
- ROC – giant bird of Middle Eastern mythology
- SATYR – half-man, half-goat of Greek mythology
- TET – Tết Nguyên Đán, the Vietnamese New Year

=== Roman numerals ===
Many puzzles ask for Roman numerals either as answers or as portions of answers. For instance:

- a puzzle might ask for the solution of 1916 − 1662 as "MCMXVI minus MDCLXII." The answer (254) would be written as CCLIV.
- IIII, sometimes used on clocks as the number 4.
- LEOIV is the answer to a clue about Pope Leo IV.
- a puzzle might ask which Super Bowl was the first to be played in Tampa, Florida. The answer is XVIII.

Standard Roman numerals run from 1 to 3999, or I to MMMCMXCIX. The first ten Roman numerals are:

$$\mathrm{I,\;II,\;III,\;IV,\;V,\;VI,\;VII,\;VIII,\;IX, and \;X.}$$

The following table shows the numerals used in crossword puzzles.

Symbol	Value
I	1 (one)
V	5 (five)
X	10 (ten)
L	50 (fifty)
C	100 (one hundred)
D	500 (five hundred)
M	1,000 (one thousand)

=== Science ===
- OZONE – a pale-blue, inorganic molecule
- XENON – a colourless noble gas with symbol 'Xe' and atomic-number '54'

=== Sports and gaming ===
- ALAI – jai alai, game played in a court with a ball and a wickerwork racket
- ALEAST, ALWEST, ALER – American League East/West and a baseball player in the AL ("AL'er")
- AT BAT – baseball batter's turn at the plate
- ANTE – forced bet in poker
- BAMA – University of Alabama Crimson Tide
- ÉPÉE – modern fencing sword
- ERA – earned run average
- ESPY – ESPY Awards; also sometimes clued as the verb "espy", meaning "catch a glimpse of"
- NLEAST, NLWEST, NLER – National League East/West and a baseball player in the NL ("NL'er")
- RBI (plural: RBIs) – run batted in
- SAC – baseball clipping of "sacrifice", as in sac fly or sac bunt
- TKO – a boxing term meaning "technical knockout"; plural is "TKOs"

==== Team nicknames ====
- BOSOX (or just SOX) – Boston Red Sox
- BUCS – Tampa Bay Buccaneers
- CAPS – Washington Capitals
- CAVS – Cleveland Cavaliers or University of Virginia Cavaliers
- HABS – Montreal Canadiens
- JAGS – Jacksonville Jaguars
- MAVS – Dallas Mavericks
- NATS – Washington Nationals
- PATS – New England Patriots
- VIKES – Minnesota Vikings
- VOLS – University of Tennessee Volunteers

==== Scoreboard abbreviations ====
- ANA – Anaheim Ducks
- ARI (or ARZ) – Arizona Cardinals, Coyotes and Diamondbacks
- ATL – Atlanta Braves, Falcons and Hawks
- BAL – Baltimore Orioles and Ravens
- BKN – Brooklyn Nets
- BOS – Boston Bruins, Celtics and Red Sox
- BUF – Buffalo Bills and Sabres
- CAR – Carolina Hurricanes and Panthers
- CGY – Calgary Flames and Stampeders
- CHA – Charlotte Hornets (formerly Bobcats)
- CHC – Chicago Cubs
- CHI – Chicago Bears, Blackhawks and Bulls
- CHW (or CWS) – Chicago White Sox
- CIN – Cincinnati Bengals and Reds
- CLE – Cleveland Browns, Cavaliers and Guardians
- COL – Colorado Avalanche and Rockies
- DAL – Dallas Cowboys, Mavericks and Stars
- DEN – Denver Broncos and Nuggets
- DET – Detroit Lions, Pistons, Red Wings and Tigers
- EDM – Edmonton Elks and Oilers
- FLA – Florida Panthers
- GSW – Golden State Warriors
- HOU – Houston Astros, Rockets and Texans (also, formerly, Oilers)
- IND – Indianapolis Colts and Indiana Pacers
- JAC (or JAX) – Jacksonville Jaguars
- LAA – Los Angeles Angels
- LAC – Los Angeles Chargers and Clippers
- LAD – Los Angeles Dodgers
- LAK – Los Angeles Kings
- LAL – Los Angeles Lakers
- LAR – Los Angeles Rams
- MEM – Memphis Grizzlies
- MIA – Miami Dolphins, Heat and Marlins
- MIL – Milwaukee Brewers and Bucks
- MIN – Minnesota Timberwolves, Twins, Vikings and Wild
- MTL – Montreal Alouettes and Canadiens (also, formerly, Expos)
- NAS (or NSH) – Nashville Predators
- NOP – New Orleans Pelicans
- NYG – New York Giants
- NYI – New York Islanders
- NYJ – New York Jets
- NYK – New York Knicks
- NYM – New York Mets
- NYR – New York Rangers
- NYY – New York Yankees
- OAK – Oakland Athletics (also, formerly, Raiders)
- OKC – Oklahoma City Thunder
- ORL – Orlando Magic
- OTT – Ottawa Senators
- PHI – Philadelphia Eagles, Flyers, Phillies and 76ers
- PHO (or PHX) – Phoenix Suns
- PIT – Pittsburgh Penguins, Pirates and Steelers
- POR – Portland Trail Blazers
- SAC – Sacramento Kings
- SAS – San Antonio Spurs
- SEA – Seattle Kraken, Mariners and Seahawks (also, formerly, SuperSonics)
- STL – St. Louis Blues and Cardinals (also, formerly, Cardinals (NFL) and Rams)
- TBL – Tampa Bay Lightning
- TEN – Tennessee Titans
- TEX – Texas Rangers
- TOR – Toronto Argonauts, Blue Jays, Maple Leafs and Raptors
- UTA – Utah Jazz
- VAN – Vancouver Canucks
- WAS (or WSH) – Washington Capitals, Commanders (formerly Redskins), Nationals, and Wizards

=== Titles of books, plays, movies, etc. ===
- AIDA – 1871 opera by Verdi set in ancient Egypt or the Elton John musical adaptation
- "ERI TU" – aria from Verdi's Un ballo in maschera
- OED – Oxford English Dictionary
- OMOO – 1847 novel by Herman Melville
- OTELLO – 1887 opera by Verdi based on Shakespeare's Othello
- R.U.R. 1920 play by Karel Čapek that popularized the word "robot"
- TOSCA – 1900 opera by Puccini
- TYPEE – 1846 novel by Melville

=== Titles used by royalty and the nobility ===
- AGA (or AGHA) – Turkish honorific for a high-level government official
- BEY – the governor of a district or province in the Ottoman Empire
- EMIR – a title given to princes and/or sheikhs who rule certain Arab countries; formerly, alternative spellings included AMIR, AMEER, and EMEER
- PASHA – high Ottoman military rank
- RAJA (or RAJAH) and RANI (or RANEE) – former Indian monarch and wife (often clued as a princess)
- SRI – South Asian honorific

=== Transportation ===
- ALERO – last Oldsmobile model
- ALFA – short for Alfa Romeo, Italian carmaker
- AUDI – German carmaker
- AVEO – Chevrolet subcompact
- BART – abbreviated name of the Bay Area Rapid Transit, the subway system that serves the San Francisco Bay Area
- EDSEL – Ford model that famously flopped
- GEO – line of compact cars sold by Chevrolet dealers, based on cars manufactured by Toyota and Suzuki
- GTI – abbreviation of Grand Tourer Injection, used on many sporty European and Japanese cars, most notably the Volkswagen Golf GTI
- GTO – abbreviation of the Italian term Gran Turismo Omologato, most notably used on the Pontiac GTO
- IROC (or IROC-Z) – racing organization or its namesake type of Chevrolet Camaro
- IRT – abbreviated name of the Interborough Rapid Transit Company which used to operate a portion of the New York City subway system
- MARTA – abbreviated name of the Metropolitan Atlanta Rapid Transit Authority, the subway system that serves the Atlanta metropolitan area
- OPEL – German carmaker
- REO Motor Car Company – American carmaker founded by Ransom E. Olds; one of its models inspired the band name REO Speedwagon
- XK-E – Jaguar model

=== U.S. states and Canadian provinces ===
Postal abbreviations: Since the late 1970s, the post offices in the United States and Canada have used computerized letter sorting. This prompted the creation of the two-capital-letter abbreviations used today for all states and most provinces (i.e., "MN" for Minnesota and "QC" for Quebec). Previously, when mail was sorted by hand, many states and provinces had abbreviations of three to five letters. Many of these longer abbreviations are now part of crosswordese. (Notes: (1) Except for Texas, states with four- or five-letter names were generally spelled out. (2) Other states and provinces not shown below had the same two-letter abbreviations that are still used today.)

- ALA – Alabama
- ALB – Alberta
- ARIZ – Arizona
- ARK – Arkansas
- CALIF – California (also, unofficially, CAL or, colloquially, CALI)
- COLO – Colorado
- CONN – Connecticut
- DEL – Delaware
- FLA – Florida
- IDA – Idaho (unofficial)
- ILL – Illinois
- IND – Indiana
- KANS – Kansas (also, unofficially, KAN)
- MICH – Michigan
- MINN – Minnesota
- MISS – Mississippi
- MONT – Montana
- NEB – Nebraska
- NEV – Nevada
- NMEX – New Mexico
- NCAR – North Carolina (unofficial)
- NDAK – North Dakota
- NWT – Northwest Territories
- OKLA – Oklahoma
- OREG – Oregon (also, unofficially, ORE)
- ONT – Ontario
- PEI – Prince Edward Island
- PENN – Pennsylvania (unofficial)
- QUE – Quebec
- SASK – Saskatchewan
- SCAR – South Carolina (unofficial)
- SDAK – South Dakota
- TENN – Tennessee
- TEX – Texas
- WASH – Washington
- WVA – West Virginia
- WIS – Wisconsin (also, unofficially, WISC)
- WYO – Wyoming

=== Weaponry and warfare ===
- ENOLA – Enola Gay, airplane that dropped the first atomic bomb
- ETO – European Theater of Operations
- SNEE – obsolete term for a dagger ("[Snick's partner]")

=== Miscellaneous crosswordese ===
- ALAMO – mission in San Antonio, Texas, where the Battle of the Alamo took place
- ARA – constellation of the Southern Hemisphere
- CREE – indigenous people of northern North America, especially what is now Canada
- ECRU – pale color similar to beige; from French écru, meaning "raw, unbleached"
- LAIC – of the laity (non-clergy)
- NÉE – designates woman's surname before marriage; literally French for "born"
- ORE – rock mined for metal
- OTOE – indigenous people of what is now Nebraska, also OTO
- SCALA – La Scala, opera house in Milan, Italy
- UTE – indigenous people of what is now Utah

=== Outdated crosswordese ===
These once-common terms are especially rare or never found in new puzzles.

- ANOA – buffalo of Indonesia
- EMAG - rarely used term for an online "electronic" magazine such as Salon.com
- INEE – type of arrow poison used by native South Americans
- SLA – Symbionese Liberation Army, 1970s radical group known for kidnapping Patty Hearst
