= It's a Small World (1935 film) =

1935 film by Irving Cummings

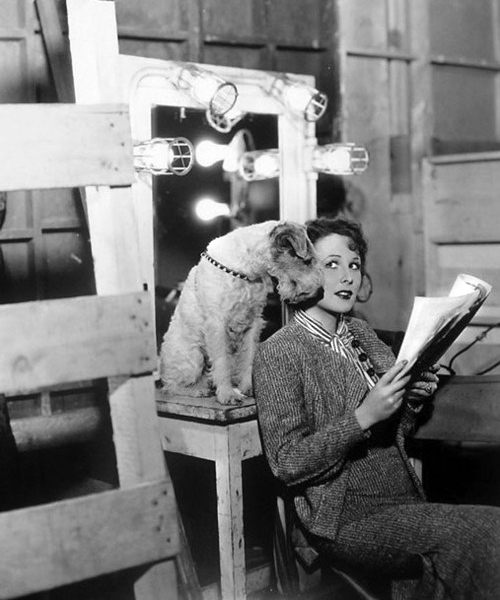
- Wendy Barrie with Skippy on the set of It's a Small World (1935).
- Directed by: Irving Cummings
- Written by: Sam Hellman; Gladys Lehman
- Based on: Highway Robbery by Albert Treynor
- Starring: Spencer Tracy; Wendy Barrie; Raymond Walburn
- Cinematography: Arthur C. Miller
- Distributed by: Fox Film Corporation
- Release date: April 12, 1935
- Running time: 70 minutes
- Country: United States
- Language: English

It's a Small World is a 1935 screwball comedy film starring Spencer Tracy and Wendy Barrie, directed by Irving Cummings. In production February 2–March 2, 1935, it was Barrie's American film debut.

== Cast ==
- Spencer Tracy as Bill Shevlin
- Wendy Barrie as Jane Dale
- Raymond Walburn as Judge Julius B. Clummerhorn
- Virginia Sale as Lizzie
- Astrid Allwyn as Nancy Naylor
- Irving Bacon as Cal
- Charles Sellon as Cyclone
- Dick Foran as Motor cop (billed as Nick)
- Belle Daube as Mrs. Dale
- Frank McGlynn, Sr. as Snake Brown, Jr.
- Skippy (dog, uncredited)
