= Skippy (dog) =

Wire Fox Terrier dog actor

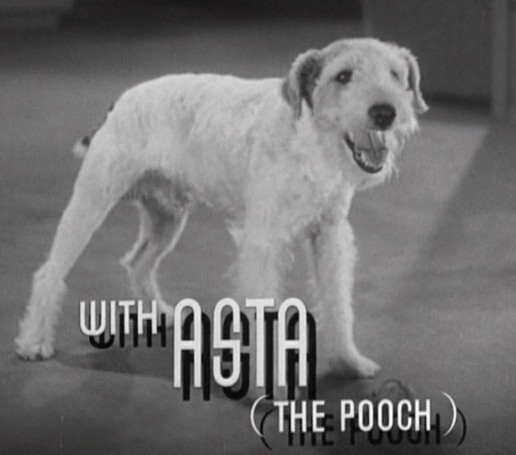
- Skippy portraying "Asta" in After the Thin Man (1936)
- Other name: Asta
- Species: Canis familiaris
- Breed: Wire Fox Terrier
- Sex: Male
- Born: c. 1931
- Died: c. 1951 (aged 20)
- Occupation: Dog actor
- Notable role: Asta in The Thin Man; Mr. Smith in The Awful Truth; George in Bringing Up Baby
- Years active: 1932–1941
- Owners: Henry East and Gale Henry

Skippy (also known as Asta, 1931–1951) was a Wire Fox Terrier dog who appeared in dozens of movies during the 1930s. Skippy is best known for the role of the pet dog "Asta" in the 1934 detective comedy The Thin Man, starring William Powell and Myrna Loy, and for his role in the 1938 comedy Bringing Up Baby, starring Katharine Hepburn and Cary Grant. Due to the popularity of his role in The Thin Man, Skippy is sometimes credited as Asta in public and in other films.

== Career ==
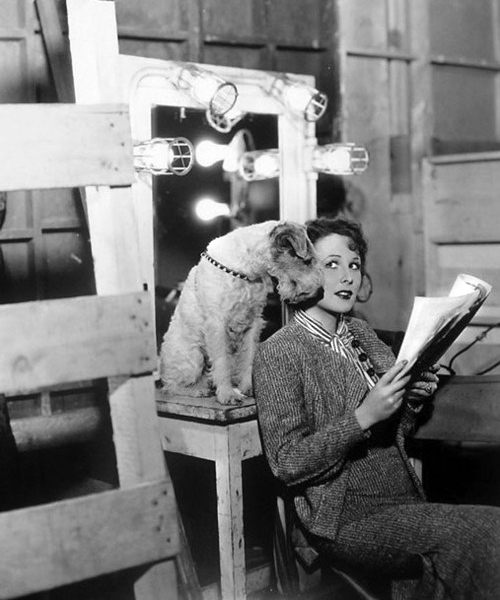
Skippy with Wendy Barrie on the set of It's a Small World (1935)

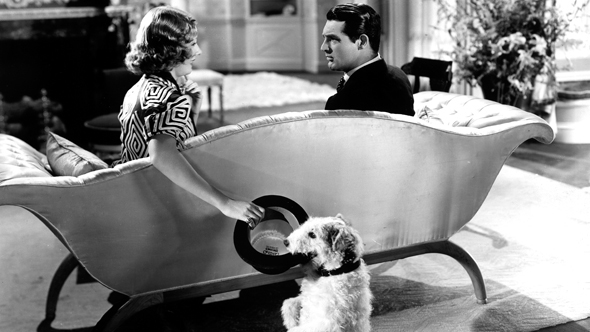
Irene Dunne, Skippy and Cary Grant in The Awful Truth (1937)

Skippy was trained by his owners, Henry East and his wife, Gale Henry East, and also by Frank Weatherwax, and assistant trainers Rudd Weatherwax, and Frank Inn.

In 1936, Skippy and several other movie dogs were profiled in the book Dog Stars of Hollywood by Gertrude Orr. At the time Skippy was said to be four and a half years old, giving him a birth year of 1931–32. He was said to be one of the most intelligent of animal stars then working in pictures. In addition to verbal commands, he also worked to hand cues, essential for a dog performing in sound films. His training began when he was three months old, and he made his first professional film appearances at the age of one year, in 1932–33, as a bit player providing "atmosphere." In Orr's book, Skippy was shown in a series of publicity shots with Wendy Barrie in It's a Small World, Mae Clarke in The Daring Young Man and Mary Carlisle in an unidentified film. He became a star overnight in The Thin Man (1934).

Skippy also made a hit as "Mr. Smith" in the 1937 film The Awful Truth, in which his character was the subject of a custody dispute between characters portrayed by Cary Grant and Irene Dunne. (In a gaffe, Cary Grant wrestles and plays with "Mr. Smith" but can be heard distinctly calling him "Skippy".)

In Bringing Up Baby (1938), Skippy played "George," the bone-hiding pup belonging to Katharine Hepburn's aunt. In Topper Takes a Trip (1938), he was "Mr. Atlas".

The American Magazine detailed Skippy's professional life in an August 1938 profile of the East kennels, titled "A Dog's Life in Hollywood":

Movie actresses stroke Skippy lovingly. They coo at him and murmur endearing terms in his ears. He takes it all in his stride, because, what with contracts, options, and exacting work before the movie cameras, he hasn't much time for the attentions of Hollywood's most beautiful stars. But if he's paid for it and given the proper cue he will snuggle in the arms of the loveliest of stars, gaze into her limpid eyes, and, if necessary—howl.

Skippy, a smart little wire-haired terrier, is one of the leading stars in pictures. He leads a glamorous life—a dog's life de luxe. He is rated as one of the smartest dogs in the world, and when contracts are signed for his appearance in a picture he gets $200 a week for putting his paw-print on the dotted line. His trainer gets a mere $60.

His owner is Mrs. Gale Henry East, once a prominent movie comedienne...When Skippy has to drink water in a scene, the first time he does it he really drinks. If there are retakes and he's had all the water he can drink, he'll go through the scene just as enthusiastically as though his throat were parched, but he'll fake it. If you watch closely you'll see he's just going through the motions of lapping and isn't really picking up water at all. And, because he has a sense of humor, he loves it when you laugh and tell him you've caught him faking but that it's all right with you.

"Treat a dog kindly and he'll do anything in the world for you."

At a time when most canine actors in Hollywood films earned $3.50 a day, Skippy's weekly salary was $250.00. A popular brand of canned dog food, "Skippy", was named for him and for many years, featured his likeness on the label.

=== The Thin Man ===
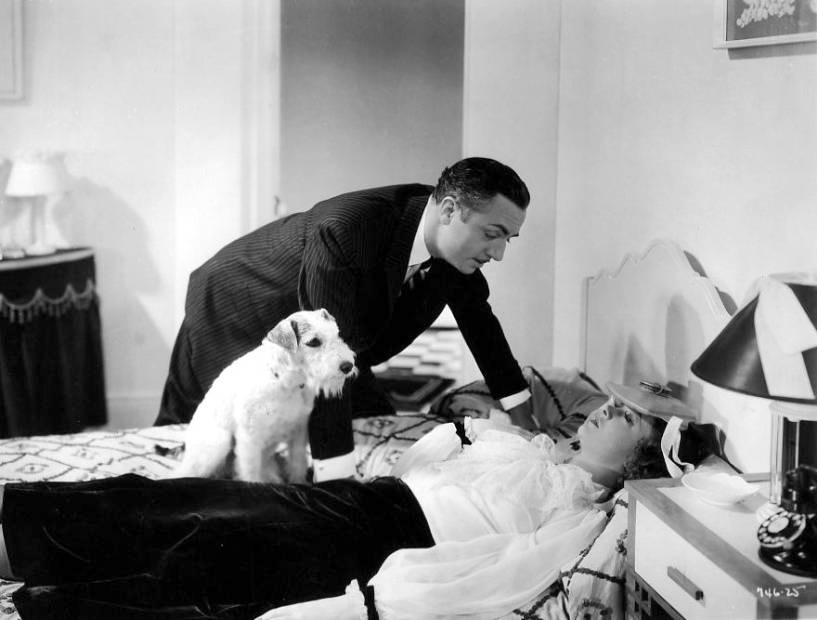
William Powell, Myrna Loy and Skippy in The Thin Man (1934)

As a character in the movie The Thin Man, Asta was the playful pet dog of Nick and Nora Charles, tugging them around town on his walks, hiding from danger, and sniffing out corpses. ("Asta, you're not a terrier, you're a police dog," Nick tells him.) The character later appeared in the sequels After the Thin Man, Another Thin Man, Shadow of the Thin Man, The Thin Man Goes Home, Song of the Thin Man, as well as the 1950s television show The Thin Man.

Loy wrote that the actors were not allowed to interact with Skippy between takes; the Easts felt it would break his concentration. Skippy once bit Loy during filming.

The original character of Asta in Dashiell Hammett's book of The Thin Man was not a male Wire-Haired Fox Terrier, but a female Schnauzer. Due to the enormous popularity of the Asta character as played by Skippy, interest in pet terriers skyrocketed. Asta's enduring fame is such that the name is a frequent answer in The New York Times crossword puzzles (crosswordese), in response to clues such as "Thin Man dog" or "Dog star."

Skippy played Asta in the first three Thin Man films. Other terriers, trained by the Weatherwax family and by Frank Inn, took on the role in subsequent films of the series, and in the television show.

== Filmography ==
Date	Title	Role	Notes
1932	Merrily We Go to Hell		Uncredited
1932	The Crash		Uncredited
1932	The Half-Naked Truth		Uncredited
1934	The Thin Man	Asta	Credited as Asta
1934	Fog Over Frisco	Ragsy	
1934	The Firebird	Rex	Uncredited
1935	The Big Broadcast of 1936		Uncredited
1935	Lottery Lover	Pom Pom	Credited as Skippy
1935	It's a Small World		
1935	The Daring Young Man		Also known as Man Proposes
1936	After the Thin Man	Asta	Credited as Asta
1937	China Passage		Uncredited
1937	Sea Racketeers	Skipper	Credited as Skippy
1937	The Awful Truth	Mr. Smith	Uncredited
1938	Bringing Up Baby	George	Credited as Asta
1938	I Am the Law	Habeas	Credited as Asta
1938	Keep Smiling	Mr. Skip	Credited as Skippy
1939	Topper Takes a Trip	Mr. Atlas	Credited as Skippy
1939	Another Thin Man	Asta	Credited as Asta
1940	Famous Movie Dogs	Asta	Short
1940	I'm Still Alive		Uncredited but called Skippy at 12:30
1941	Shadow of the Thin Man	Asta	Credited as Asta
1944	The Thin Man Goes Home	Asta	Skippy's successor
1947	Song of the Thin Man	Asta	Skippy's successor credited as Asta

== See also ==
- List of individual dogs
