= Margaret Farrar =

Journalist and crossword puzzle editor

Margaret Petherbridge Farrar
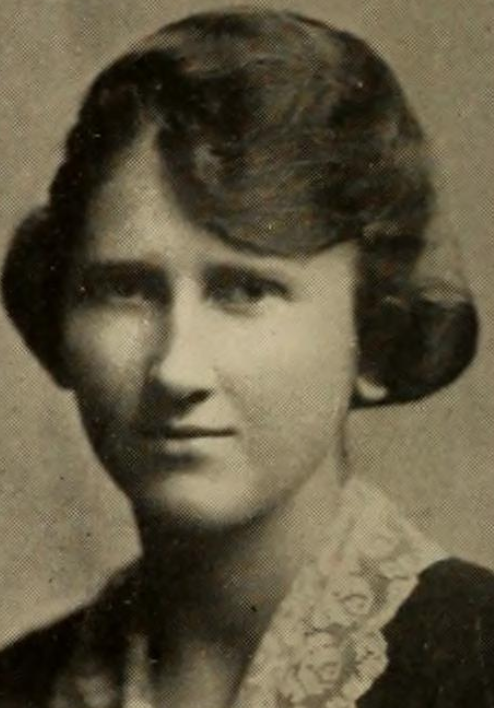
- Margaret Petherbridge, from the 1919 yearbook of Smith College
- Born: Margaret Petherbridge; March 23, 1897; Brooklyn, New York, U.S.
- Died: June 11, 1984 (aged 87); Manhattan, New York, U.S.
- Education: Smith College 1919
- Spouse: John C. Farrar
- Writing career
- Genres: Journalist, crossword puzzle editor
- Notable work: New York Times crossword puzzle

Margaret Petherbridge Farrar (March 23, 1897 – June 11, 1984) was an American journalist and the first crossword puzzle editor for The New York Times (1942–1968). Creator of many of the rules of modern crossword design, she compiled and edited a long-running series of crossword puzzle books – including the first book of any kind that Simon & Schuster published (1924). She was described by the Los Angeles Times as "the grand dame of the American crossword puzzle."

== Early life ==
Margaret Petherbridge was born March 23, 1897, in Brooklyn, New York, to Margaret (Furey) and Henry Petherbridge, who owned a licorice factory. A lifelong resident of New York City, she attended the Berkeley Institute in Brooklyn and graduated from Smith College in 1919. After graduating, she worked briefly as a bank secretary.

== Career ==
Petherbridge's career in crossword puzzles began at the New York World in 1921. She had been hired as the secretary to the editor of the Sunday edition of the New York World; he eventually assigned her to assist crossword inventor Arthur Wynne, who was overloaded with reader submissions of puzzles and complaints about flawed puzzles. Petherbridge had never solved a puzzle herself and therefore chose puzzles to be printed without testing them, until fellow World employee Franklin P. Adams criticized her for it; in response, she tried the puzzles, and discovered that some of them were unsolvable. Petherbridge became skilled at preventing errors, leading to her status as an unofficial editor of the crossword-puzzle section. She eventually was allowed to create her own puzzles. She subsequently described her reaction as "[taking] an oath to edit the crosswords to the essence of perfection;" her puzzles eventually became more popular than Wynne's.

In early 1924, Adams introduced Petherbridge to Richard L. Simon and M. Lincoln Schuster, who were launching a book publishing company but did not yet have any manuscripts. Petherbridge, along with two co-authors, was given an advance of $25 and asked to compile a book of crossword puzzles. Due to their anxiety over the success of the book, Simon & Schuster decided to issue the book under a different imprint. The Cross Word Puzzle Book launched Simon & Schuster as a major publisher and was the first of four bestselling compilations published that year. Simon & Schuster's crossword books became the longest continuously published book series.

In 1926, Petherbridge married John C. Farrar, one of the co-founders of Farrar & Rinehart and Farrar, Straus and Giroux. She left the World to raise a family and restricted her work to editing books (Simon & Schuster published about two per year). She used her royalties from the crossword books, which her father had invested on her behalf, to underwrite Farrar's publishing business.

After the United States joined World War II, The New York Times' Sunday editor sent a memo, attaching a letter from Margaret Farrar, urging the paper to publish a crossword puzzle. Farrar's note said, “I don’t think I have to sell you on the increased demand for this type of pastime in an increasingly worried world. You can’t think of your troubles while solving a crossword.” Farrar returned to journalism in 1942 as founding puzzle editor of The New York Times. The first New York Times crossword was published under a pseudonym Farrar occasionally used, Anna Gram.

From the start of her work at The New York Times, Farrar "raised the level of the language in crosswords." The crossword began in the Sunday edition, but became a daily feature in September 1950. In her position as editor of the crossword at The New York Times, Farrar encouraged and inspired many crossword puzzle writers and editors. Farrar created many regulations that have become standards, such as limiting the number of black squares in the grid, creating a minimum word-length of three letters, requiring grids to have rotational symmetry and have an odd number of squares in width and length, and forbidding unchecked squares.

In 1959, a New Yorker article described Farrar as "[p]robably the most important person in the world of the crossword puzzle." Farrar remained with The New York Times until 1969. Farrar also edited eighteen volumes of crossword puzzles for the paper. After leaving The New York Times, Farrar edited puzzles for the Los Angeles Times Syndicate. Farrar also edited novels for Farrar, Straus and Giroux (1950–1960), and upon her husband's death in 1974 she succeeded him as a member of the company's board of directors.

== Death and legacy ==
Farrar died June 11, 1984, at her home in Manhattan. Up to her death, she compiled two crossword puzzle books per year for Simon & Schuster (she had been working on the 134th volume), and was editing puzzles for the Los Angeles Times Syndicate. Farrar's publishing record from 1924 to 1984 is the longest running continuous series in American history.

Stanley Newman referred to Farrar as a "crossword genius" and credits her with the creation of "many, if not most" of the rules that guide modern crossword design. Will Shortz wrote of her:

"Perhaps Margaret Farrar's greatest legacy is the large number of expert puzzlemakers she discovered and/or nurtured over the years – Will Weng, Eugene T. Maleska, Frances Hansen, Anne Fox, A.J. Santora, Diana R. Sessions, Jules Arensberg, Herbert Ettenson, Harold T. Bers, Mel Taub … the list goes on. Other editors have left their mark on the world of crosswords … but it was Margaret Farrar, more than anyone else, who established the American crossword rules and format, and whose smooth, sensible, timeless style of editing I still try to emulate today."
