= Merv Griffin's Crosswords =

American television game show

- Created by: Merv Griffin
- Presented by: Ty Treadway
- Announcer: Edd Hall
- Theme music composer: Merv Griffin
- Country of origin: United States
- Original language: English
- No. of seasons: 1
- No. of episodes: 225

Production
- Running time: approx. 22–26 minutes
- Production companies: Yani-Brune Entertainment; Merv Griffin Entertainment

Original release
- Network: Syndicated
- Release: September 10, 2007 – May 16, 2008

Merv Griffin's Crosswords (also simply called Crosswords) is an American game show based on crossword puzzles. The show was created by its namesake, Merv Griffin, who died shortly after beginning production on the series. Ty Treadway was the host, and Edd Hall was the announcer.

The series ran in daily syndication from September 10, 2007 and aired first-run episodes until May 16, 2008, with reruns airing in most markets until September 5, 2008; it has remained in continuous reruns on various outlets since then.

The show was produced by Yani-Brune Entertainment and Merv Griffin Entertainment, and was distributed by Program Partners.

== Gameplay ==
Crosswords initially pitted two contestants in direct competition, filling in answers in the day's crossword puzzle one at a time in a seemingly random (but actually predetermined) order. The answer boxes denoting the number of letters in a word were shown with a crossword clue and a dollar value. As the game progressed, a word could have multiple blanks already filled in.

After the clue was read, the contestants could ring in, with the order they did so denoted on the screens on the front of their podiums. A contestant had to give a correct answer and then spell it correctly in order to earn the money attached to the clue. If the contestant misspelled the word, did not come up with the correct solution, or failed to give an answer, the amount of the clue was deducted from their score.

Word Length	Round 1	Round 2	Round 3
3 letters	$50	$100	$200
4–6 letters	$100	$200	$400
7+ letters	$150	$300	$600

For all but one week of episodes in December 2007, Round 3 values were the same as in Round 2; the Round 3 values shown above were later made permanent.

After Round 1, three more contestants, dubbed "spoilers", joined the game and stood in a row of three podiums behind the players that started the game. The spoilers were able to ring in, but the front row players always had priority when answering and a spoiler could only attempt a word if neither front row player answered correctly or rang in. If a spoiler gave a correct solution to the clue, he/she immediately traded places with one of the front row players. If both of the main players got the answer wrong or failed to ring in, the spoiler had a choice of which podium to take. However, if only one contestant got the answer wrong, the spoiler had to take that position. Ringing in with an incorrect answer locked a spoiler out of play, and spoilers could only return to the game if one of the other two answered correctly and took a position on the front row or if they each gave an incorrect answer, at which point all three spoilers would be let back into the game.

The player standing at the front row podium with the highest money total when time ran out at the end of Round 3, regardless of whether his/her score was positive or negative (the latter occurred once during the show's run), won the game and whatever money was in the podium, and advanced to the bonus round. The other competitors received a Croton watch with the show's logo on it.

In the event of a tie, one final tiebreaker clue was played to determine the winner with all players and spoilers involved; the first to solve it correctly won the game.

=== Special words ===
==== Crossword Getaway ====
In the original format, one word in each of the first two rounds was designated the "Crossword Getaway," placing a trip in the bank of the contestant who solved that particular word. Trips were usually to resort destinations in California, Nevada, and Arizona. If a Getaway-designated word went unsolved, the prize was not awarded and gameplay continued without it.

==== Crossword Extra ====
The Crossword Extra was a bonus word played once in Round 1 and twice in subsequent rounds (originally once in each round, with the second word added following the removal of the Getaways). Similar to the Daily Double in Jeopardy!, the Extra clue was revealed upon correctly guessing another word. The contestant then wagered all or part of his/her score (or up to $500, $1,000, or $2,000—depending on the round—if he/she had less than those amounts). A correct answer added the wager, while an incorrect answer deducted it.

In several episodes (five of which aired in double-run markets in late September 2007), there were alternate "Crossword Extra" rules. The Crossword Extra word was not part of the main puzzle (so it was truly an "extra" word) and announced before certain clues in each round. A correct Crossword Extra answer was worth $300 in Round 1 and $600 in Round 2 with no deduction for a wrong answer or no answer at all. There was no Crossword Extra in Round 3.

==== Changes ====
Beginning with the episode aired November 1, 2007, the Getaways were eliminated, and additional Extras were added (based on the original format). One Extra appeared in Round 1, but two Extras appeared in Round 2, and one or two appeared in Round 3. The Round 3 wagering maximum was also increased to the higher of $2,000 or the player's total score.

For a short time, the Crossword Extra was known as the "Crossword Xbox 360 Extra" as a promotion for the Crosswords video game released on Xbox Live Arcade, which also added an Xbox 360 console to the bonus prize during episodes with this promotion. Beginning in late December 2007, players were allowed to bet up to $3,000 in Round 3 if they had that amount or less; this was added with the redoubling of the dollar amounts for Round 3.

=== Bonus round ===
In the closing round, the winning contestant attempted to fill in the remaining spaces of the show's crossword puzzle within ninety seconds. The champion would begin by calling out a number ("9 Across", "22 Down", etc.) and would listen to the clue for that word. As before, the word had to be correctly guessed and spelled, but the only penalty for an incorrect guess was to have to pick the word again.

If the champion completed the puzzle within the time limit, he/she won $5,000 cash (originally $2,000) and a trip. For a brief period of time, as part of the aforementioned promotional deal with Microsoft, an Xbox 360 was also awarded to the champion if he/she won the bonus game along with a game package. In the "alternate Crossword Extra" episodes, players received $100 for each bonus round word they answered.

The contestant received a Croton watch in the event he/she won the main game with no money and lost the Bonus Round.

== Production ==
Crosswords was originally planned to be recorded at the NBC Tower in Chicago but instead recorded at Sunset Bronson Studios in Hollywood. Stock audience sound effects were used instead of a live audience.

The theme song was an updated version of "Buzzword," written by Griffin and arranged by Tim Mosher and Andy "Stoker" Growcott (credited as "Tim Mosher & Stoker"). The original version was used as a prize cue on Wheel of Fortune in the late 1980s and early 1990s.

== Broadcast history ==
During the program's development, the series was originally known as Let's Play Crosswords and later changed to Let's Do Crosswords. On each episode, host Treadway used either phrase to begin the day's game. The Play title also appeared on some on-screen VCR displays and pre-programmed television listings.

Griffin worked on the pilot, which had contestants building a cash jackpot that would be offered to the eventual winner, and the first week of the series' production, when he died; in addition to his creator credit, he was listed posthumously in the show's credits as executive producer. The clues and puzzles used throughout the run were written by veteran crossword puzzle maker Timothy Parker, who also writes the USA Today crossword and was hand-picked by Griffin.

Crosswords was sold to approximately 100+ markets and aired during the 2007-2008 season, usually placed in mid-morning or early afternoon slots. In addition, the series was either packaged with other game shows such as Temptation (a one-season revival of Sale of the Century) in some markets while others aired an hour-long block (two episodes).

=== Critical reviews ===
The show's earlier episodes, with a top payout of just over $4,000, were on par with Game Show Network's earlier original programs (through 2002) – although these increased to a more respectable $10,000 range by the end of the run; despite the low clue amounts, some contestants won five-figure sums in the main game alone (for example, contestant Bruce Haights, an executive assistant from Indiana, won $11,550 and two trips in his podium). Further, Crosswords did not provide a "house minimum" for winning contestants, causing some to walk away with little to show for their efforts and at least one contestant with a negative total score who was unable to complete the puzzle and thus did not win any money, leaving with only the same Croton watch given to losing contestants.

=== Ratings ===
Initial ratings for Crosswords were a 0.8 share, significantly less than the more established games which have garnered at least 1.5 shares. In November 2007, Crosswords hit the 1.0 mark and was reported to have been picked up for a second season in the November 26, 2007, issue of Broadcasting & Cable magazine, with official confirmation coming on January 28, 2008.

=== Airings and reruns ===
Since Crosswords aired two episodes in some markets, the series taped "extras" (most all of which were of the original format) for the purpose of reducing repeats; this resulted in 45 weeks of shows being taped; however, not all double-run (or even single-run) markets aired all 225 episodes.

Because of the format's lack of returning champions, the series was not shown in taping order (i.e., the first taped episode on September 10, the second on September 11, and so on – lacking repeats – through the 225th episode on July 18); this made it impossible for casual viewers to date rerun episodes (much like most original programs broadcast by Game Show Network) and were thus not able to determine whether one episode from a particular format was taped before or after another episode using the same format – indeed, the first episode ever aired was in fact the 27th one taped, with no discernible rhyme or reason as to why certain episodes aired when they did.

The lack of returning champions also caused some odd scheduling in double-run markets – some affiliates aired an episode with the later format, followed by one using the "original" or "alternate" formats. Occasionally, stations aired an episode several times in a two-week span, while other episodes were rerun in the second half-hour after already being shown in the first.

=== Aborted renewal and cancellation ===
Before production was slated to resume in June 2008, Merv Griffin Entertainment and Program Partners announced that production of the series would be halted until at least early 2009, with the cited reason being high production costs (although the general response to this statement was that nothing done or given away on the show could have caused such a thing). Three-quarters of carrying affiliates had been ready to pick up Season 2.

In the markets that aired Crosswords (plus some that did not carry the series, including West Palm Beach, Florida CBS affiliate WPEC; sister station WFLX had carried Season 1), stations were given a choice of three programs to air as part of a Program Partners "Daytime Plus" package. One was a package of reruns from the first season titled The Best of Crosswords. The other two choices were reruns of Style by Jury, a Canadian makeover series, and Inside the Box, a pop-culture based game show that had run for one season in 2006.

Most of the stations carrying Crosswords immediately dropped the series after the hiatus was announced, including the two largest markets of New York and Los Angeles. Neither of those two markets picked up the rerun package, and most of the rest did not opt for either of the other "Daytime Plus" options (although WNBC in New York, which had aired Crosswords, added both) and instead opted for other new syndicated programming – either game shows (such as Trivial Pursuit: America Plays or a syndicated version of Deal or No Deal) or talk shows (such as The Bonnie Hunt Show). Stations that chose to air the "Best Of" package began with an episode from the "alternate" format, although viewers quickly noticed that nothing was added ("Best Of" logo, production slate, episode number, recording date, original airdate, etc.) to distinguish this set of repeats from Season 1; this had the side effect of causing stations that aired Season 1 to show continuous repeats since the first-run episodes ended.

Crosswords was officially considered cancelled in February 2009, and around the same time the "Daytime Plus" experiment ended when Program Partners pulled Inside the Box from its affiliates. Although the show only lasted one season, reruns have continued to air for over a decade since the show's cancellation. Reruns aired for several years afterward on Retro TV. The show previously aired on cable's FamilyNet and American Life Network.

== Merchandising ==
Three official tie-in books were released in paperback on October 16, 2007:

- Merv Griffin's Crosswords Volume 1: 100 Easiest Puzzles
- Merv Griffin's Crosswords Volume 2: 100 Easy Puzzles
- Merv Griffin's Crosswords Volume 3: 100 Easy-to-Hard Puzzles

These puzzle books were edited by Timothy Parker, who supplied all the puzzles for the TV show and is puzzle editor for USA Today. It is unknown whether any of the puzzles used in the books were used in the series, but if this is the case then this would not hold true for at least 75 of the puzzles.

Advertisements during 2008 shows announced that a Crosswords game was available through the Xbox Live Arcade. The Xbox 360 console was featured as part of the grand prize package and as a sponsor for the Crossword Extras, which for a time became known as "Crossword Xbox 360 Extras."

A board game of the show was released by Hasbro in fall 2008, with a DVD version also in the works. Oberon Games released a downloadable PC game of Crosswords on February 11, 2008, and began selling it in retail chains later that year.

In 2008, Electronic Arts released a mobile version of Crosswords which was available for download at the show's website.

On November 20, 2008, THQ released a console version of Crosswords for the Wii.
