= Crossword =

Grid-based word puzzle

An American-style 15×15 crossword grid layout

A crossword is a word game consisting of a grid of black and white squares with numbers on the corners, into which solvers enter words or phrases ("entries") crossing each other horizontally ("across") and vertically ("down") according to a set of clues. Each white square is typically filled with one letter, while the black squares are used to separate entries. The first white square in each entry is typically numbered to correspond to its clue.

Crosswords commonly appear in newspapers and magazines. The earliest crosswords that resemble their modern form were popularized by the New York World in the 1910s. Many variants of crosswords are popular around the world, including cryptic crosswords and many language-specific variants.

Crossword construction in modern times usually involves the use of software. Constructors choose a theme (except for themeless puzzles), place the theme answers in a grid which is usually rotationally symmetric, fill in the rest of the grid, and then write clues.

A person who constructs or solves crosswords is called a "cruciverbalist". The word "cruciverbalist" appears to have been coined in the 1970s from the Latin roots crucis, meaning 'cross', and verbum, meaning 'word'.

== American-style crosswords ==
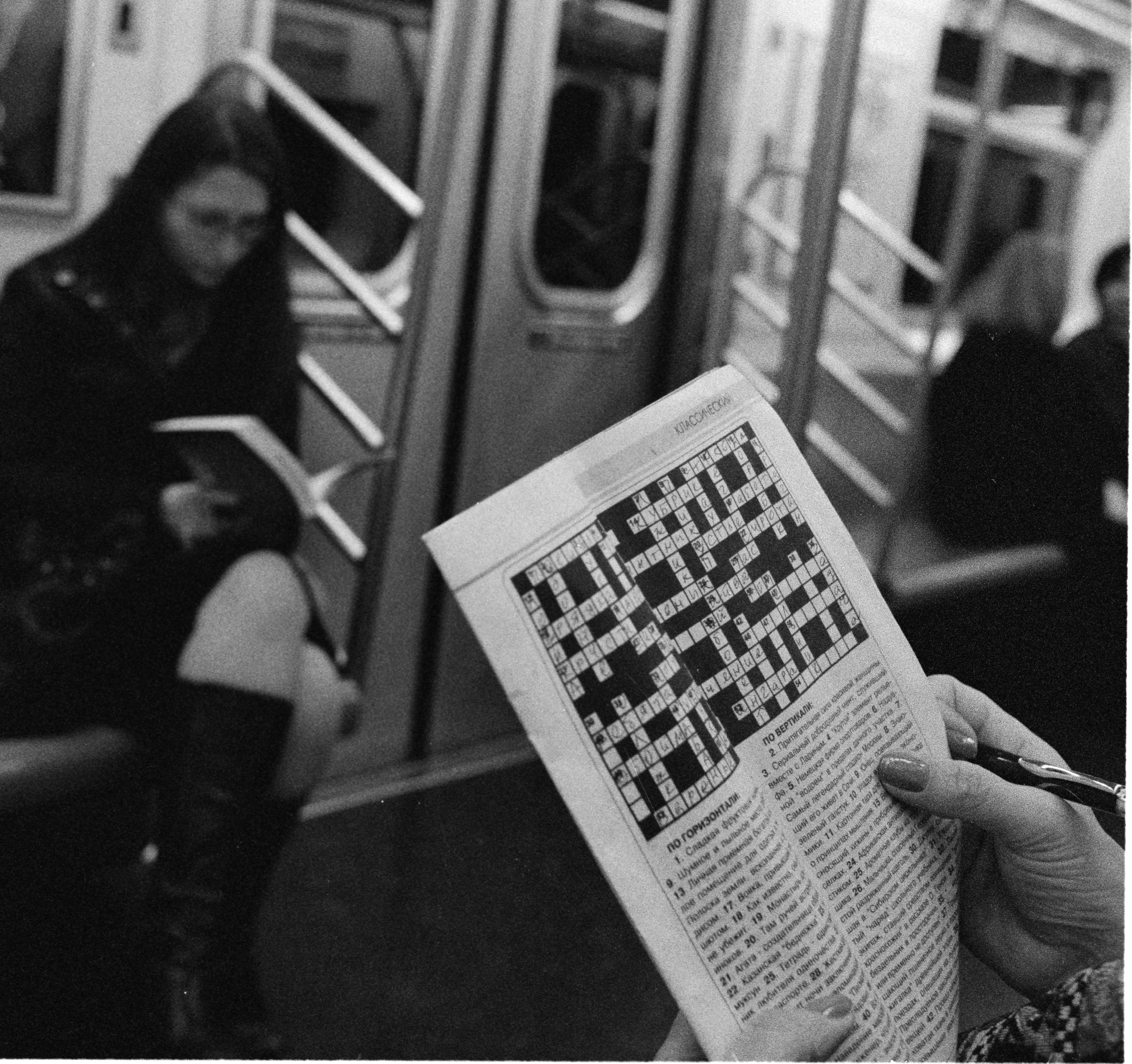
A person works on a Russian-language crossword puzzle in the New York City Subway, 2008.

Puzzles are often one of several standard sizes. For example, many weekday newspaper puzzles (such as the American New York Times crossword puzzle) are 15×15 squares, while weekend puzzles may be 21×21, 23×23, or 25×25. The New York Times puzzles also set a common pattern for American crosswords by increasing in difficulty throughout the week: their Monday puzzles are the easiest and the puzzles get harder each day until Saturday. Their larger Sunday puzzle is about the same level of difficulty as a weekday-size Thursday puzzle. This has led U.S. solvers to use the day of the week as a shorthand when describing how hard a puzzle is: e.g. an easy puzzle may be referred to as a "Monday" or a "Tuesday", a medium-difficulty puzzle as a "Wednesday", and a truly difficult puzzle as a "Saturday".

=== Clues: conventions and types ===
American-style crossword clues, called straight or quick clues by those more familiar with cryptic puzzles, are often simple definitions of the answers. Often, a straight clue is not in itself sufficient to distinguish between several possible answers, either because multiple synonymous answers may fit or because the clue itself is a homonym (e.g., "Lead" as in to be ahead in a contest or "Lead" as in the element), so the solver must make use of checks to establish the correct answer with certainty. For example, the answer to the clue "PC key" for a three-letter answer could be ESC, ALT, TAB, DEL, or INS, so until a check is filled in, giving at least one of the letters, the correct answer cannot be determined.

In most American-style crosswords, the majority of the clues in the puzzle are straight clues, with the remainder being one of the other types described below.

Crossword clues are generally consistent with the solutions. For instance, clues and their solutions should always agree in tense, number, and degree. If a clue is in the past tense, so is the answer: thus "Traveled on horseback" would be a valid clue for the solution RODE, but not for RIDE. Similarly, "Family members" would be a valid clue for AUNTS but not UNCLE, while "More joyful" could clue HAPPIER but not HAPPIEST.

==== Capitalization ====
Capitalization of answer letters is conventionally ignored; crossword puzzles are typically filled in, and their answer sheets published, in all caps. This ensures a proper name can have its initial capital letter checked with a non-capitalizable letter in the intersecting clue.

Some clue examples:

- Fill-in-the-blank clues are often the easiest in a puzzle and a good place to start solving, e.g., "_____ Boleyn" = ANNE.
- A question mark at the end of clue usually signals that the clue/answer combination involves some sort of pun or wordplay, e.g., "Grateful?" = ASHES, since a grate might be full of them.
- Most widely distributed American crosswords today (e.g., The New York Times, The Washington Post, The Boston Globe, USA Today, etc.) also contain colloquial answers, i.e., entries in the puzzle grid that try to replicate everyday colloquial language. In such a puzzle, one might see phrases such as WHATS UP, AS IF, or WHADDYA WANT.

==== Abbreviations ====
The constraints of the American-style grid (in which every letter is checked) often require a fair number of answers not to be dictionary words. As a result, the following ways to clue abbreviations and other non-words, although they can be found in "straight" British crosswords, are much more common in American ones:

- Abbreviations, the use of a foreign language, variant spellings, or other unusual word tricks are indicated in the clue. A crossword creator might choose to clue the answer SEN (as in the abbreviation for "senator") as "Washington bigwig: Abbr." or "Member of Cong.", with the abbreviation in the clue indicating that the answer is to be similarly abbreviated. The use of "Var." indicates the answer is a variant spelling (e.g., EMEER instead of EMIR), while the use of foreign language or a foreign place name within the clue indicates that the answer is also in a foreign language. For example, ETE (été, French for "summer") might be clued as "Summer, in the Sorbonne". ROMA could be clued as "Italia's capital", whereas the clue "Italy's capital" would indicate the English spelling Rome.
- The eight possible abbreviations for a position on a compass, e.g., NNW (north-northwest) or ESE (east-southeast), occur with some frequency. They can be clued as simply "Compass point", where the desired answer is determined by a combination of logic—since the third letter can be only E or W, and the second letter can be only N or S—and a process of elimination using checks. Alternatively, compass point answers are more frequently clued as "XXX to YYY direction", where XXX and YYY are two place names. For example, SSW might be clued as "New York to Washington DC dir.". Similarly, a clue such as "Right on the map" means EAST. A clue could also consist of objects that point a direction, e.g., "vane dir." or "windsock dir.".
- Roman numerals, and arithmetic involving them, frequently appear as well; the clue "IV times III" (4×3) would yield XII (12).
- In addition, partial answers are allowed in American-style crosswords, where the answer represents part of a longer phrase. For example, the clue "Mind your _____ Qs" gives the answer PSAND (Ps and).
- Non-dictionary phrases are also allowed in answers. Thus, the clue "Mocked" could result in the grid entry LAUGHED AT.

==== Themes ====
Many American crossword puzzles feature a "theme" consisting of a number of long entries (generally three to five in a standard 15×15-square "weekday-size" puzzle) that share some relationship, type of pun, or other element in common. As an example, the New York Times crossword of April 26, 2005 by Sarah Keller, edited by Will Shortz, featured five themed entries ending in the different parts of a tree: SQUARE ROOT, TABLE LEAF, WARDROBE TRUNK, BRAIN STEM, and BANK BRANCH.

The above is an example of a category theme, where the theme elements are all members of the same set. Other types of themes include:

- Quote themes, featuring a famous quote broken up into parts to fit in the grid (and usually clued as "Quote, part 1", "Quote, part 2", etc.)
- Rebus themes, where multiple letters or even symbols occupy a single square in the puzzle (e.g., BERMUDAΔ)
- Addition themes, where theme entries are created by adding a letter, letters, or word(s) to an existing word or phrase. For example, "Crucial pool shot?" = CRITICAL MASSE (formed by taking the phrase "critical mass" and adding an "e" on the end. All the theme entries in a given puzzle must be formed by the same process (so another entry might be "Greco-Roman buddy?" = WRESTLING MATE—"wrestling mat" with an "e" added on). An example of a multiple-letter addition (and one that does not occur at the end of the entry) might be "Crazy about kitchen storage?" = CABINET FEVER (derived from "cabin fever").
- Subtraction themes, the reverse of the above, where letters are removed to make a new word or phrase.
- Compound themes, where the starts or ends of the theme entries can all precede or follow another word, which is given elsewhere in the puzzle. For example, a puzzle with theme entries that begin with PAPER, BALL, and WATER and elsewhere in the puzzle, the word BOY clued as "Word that can follow the start of [theme entries]".
- Anniversary or tribute themes, commemorating a specific person, place, or event. For example, on October 7, 2011 The New York Times crossword commemorated the life of Apple CEO Steve Jobs who had died on October 5. Theme entries related to Jobs' life included MACINTOSH, PIXAR, THINK DIFFERENT, CREATIVE GENIUS, STEVE JOBS, and APPLE.
- Synonym themes, where the theme entries all contain synonyms, e.g., a Los Angeles Times puzzle featuring a set of theme entries that contain the words RAVEN, JET, EBONY, and SABLE, all synonyms for "black".
- Numerous other types have been identified, including spoonerisms, poems, shifted letters, rhyming phrases, puns, homophones, and combinations of two or more of other types of themes.

The themed crossword puzzle was invented in 1958 by Harold T. Bers, an advertising executive and frequent contributor to The New York Times crossword.

The Simon & Schuster Crossword Puzzle Series has published many unusually themed crosswords. "Rosetta Stone", by Sam Bellotto Jr., incorporates a Caesar cipher cryptogram as the theme; the key to breaking the cipher is the answer to 1Across. Another unusual theme requires the solver to use the answer to a clue as another clue. The answer to that clue is the real solution.

==== Indirect clues ====
Many puzzles feature clues involving wordplay which are to be taken metaphorically or in some sense other than their literal meaning, requiring some form of lateral thinking. Depending on the puzzle creator or the editor, this might be represented either with a question mark at the end of the clue or with a modifier such as "maybe" or "perhaps". In more difficult puzzles, the indicator may be omitted, increasing ambiguity between a literal meaning and a wordplay meaning. Examples:

- "Half a dance" could clue CAN (half of CANCAN) or CHA (half of CHACHA).
- If taken literally, "Start of spring" could clue MAR (for March), but it could also clue ESS, the spelled-out form of the starting letter S.
- "Nice summer?" clues ETE, summer in Nice, France (été being French for "summer"), rather than a nice (pleasant) summer. This clue also takes advantage of the fact that in American-style crosswords, the initial letter of a clue is always capitalized, whether or not it is a proper noun. In this clue, the initial capitalization further obscures whether the clue is referring to "nice" as in "pleasant" or "Nice" as in the French city.
- "Pay addition", taken literally, clues BONUS. When taken as an indirect clue, however, it could also clue OLA (the addition of -ola to pay- results in PAYOLA).

==== Other clue variations ====
Any type of puzzle may contain cross-references, where the answer to one clue forms part of another clue, in which it is referred to by number and direction. E.g., a puzzle might have 1-across clued as "Central character in The Lord of the Rings" = FRODO, with 17-down clued as "Precious object for 1-Across" = RING.

When an answer is composed of multiple or hyphenated words, some crosswords (especially in Britain) indicate the structure of the answer. For example, "(3,5)" after a clue indicates that the answer is composed of a three-letter word followed by a five-letter word. Most American-style crosswords do not provide this information.

=== Metapuzzles ===
Some crossword designers have started including a metapuzzle, or "meta" for short, a second puzzle within the completed puzzle. After the player has correctly solved the crossword puzzle in the usual fashion, the solution forms the basis of a second puzzle. The designer usually includes a hint to the metapuzzle. For instance, the puzzle Eight Isn't Enough by Matt Gaffney gives the clue "This week's contest answer is a three-word phrase whose second word is 'or'." The crossword solution includes the entries "BROUGHT TO NAUGHT", "MIGHT MAKES RIGHT", "CAUGHT A STRAIGHT", and "HEIGHT AND WEIGHT", which are all three-word phrases with two words ending in -ght. The solution to the meta is a similar phrase in which the middle word is "or": "FIGHT OR FLIGHT".

Since September 2015, the Wall Street Journal Friday crossword has featured a crossword contest metapuzzle, with the prize of a WSJ mug going to a reader randomly chosen from among those submitting the correct answer.

=== Schrödinger or quantum puzzles ===
Some puzzle grids contain more than one correct answer for the same set of clues. These are called Schrödinger or quantum puzzles, alluding to the Schrödinger's Cat thought experiment in quantum physics. Schrödinger puzzles have frequently been published in venues including Fireball Crosswords and The American Values Club Crosswords, and at least ten have appeared in The New York Times since the late 1980s. The daily New York Times puzzle for November 5, 1996, by Jeremiah Farrell, had a clue for 39 across that read "Lead story in tomorrow's newspaper, with 43 Across (!)." The answer for 43 across was ELECTED; depending on the outcome of that day's presidential election, the answer for 39 across would have been correct with either CLINTON or BOBDOLE, as would each of the corresponding down answers. On September 1, 2016, the daily New York Times puzzle by Ben Tausig had four squares which led to correct answers reading both across and down if solvers entered either "M" or "F". The puzzle's theme, GENDERFLUID, was revealed at 37 across in the center of the puzzle: "Having a variable identity, as suggested by four squares in this puzzle."

== Cryptic crosswords ==
A lattice-style grid common for cryptic crosswords

In cryptic crosswords, the clues are puzzles in themselves. A typical clue contains both a definition at the beginning or end of the clue and wordplay, which provides a way to manufacture the word indicated by the definition, and which may not parse logically. Cryptics usually give the length of their answers in parentheses after the clue, which is especially useful with multi-word answers. Certain signs indicate different forms of wordplay. Solving cryptics is harder to learn than standard crosswords, as learning to interpret the different types of cryptic clues can take some practice. In Great Britain and throughout much of the Commonwealth, cryptics of varying degrees of difficulty are featured in many newspapers.

The first crosswords with strictly cryptic clues appeared in the 1920s, pioneered by Edward Powys Mathers. He established the principle of cryptic crossword clues. Cryptic crossword clues typically consist of a definition and some type of word play. Cryptic crossword clues need to be viewed two ways. One is a surface reading and one a hidden meaning. The surface reading is the basic reading of the clue to look for key words and how those words are constructed in the clue. The second way is the hidden meaning. This can be a double definition, an anagram, a homophone, or words backwards. There are eight main types of clues in cryptic crosswords.

=== Types of cryptic clues ===
There are several types of wordplay used in cryptics. One is straightforward definition substitution using parts of a word. For example, in one puzzle by Mel Taub, the answer IMPORTANT is given the clue "To bring worker into the country may prove significant". The explanation is that to import means "to bring into the country", the "worker" is a worker ant, and "significant" means important. Here, "significant" is the straight definition (appearing here at the end of the clue), "to bring worker into the country" is the wordplay definition, and "may prove" serves to link the two. Note that in a cryptic clue, there is almost always only one answer that fits both the definition and the wordplay, so that when one sees the answer, one knows that it is the right answer—although it can sometimes be a challenge to figure out why it is the right answer. A good cryptic clue should provide a fair and exact definition of the answer, while at the same time being deliberately misleading.

Another type of wordplay used in cryptics is the use of homophones. For example, the clue "A few, we hear, add up (3)" is the clue for SUM. The straight definition is "add up", meaning "totalize". The solver must guess that "we hear" indicates a homophone, and so a homophone of a synonym of "A few" ("some") is the answer. Other words relating to sound or hearing can be used to signal the presence of a homophone clue (e.g., "aloud", "audibly", "in conversation", etc.).

The double meaning is commonly used as another form of wordplay. For example, "Cat's tongue (7)" is solved by PERSIAN, since this is a type of cat, as well as a tongue, or language. This is the only type of cryptic clue without wordplay—both parts of the clue are a straight definition.

Cryptics often include anagrams, as well. For example, in "Slipped a disc – it's cruel (8)" an anagram is indicated by "slipped", with the definition to aim for being "cruel". Ignoring all punctuation, "a disc – it's" produces "SADISTIC". Colin Dexter advised that "Usually the indicator will be an adjective (drunk, fancy, unusual, and so on); an adverb (badly, excitedly, unexpectedly); a past participle (altered, broken, jumbled) or indeed any phrase giving a similar meaning."

Embedded words are another common trick in cryptics. The clue "Bigotry aside, I'd take him (9)" is solved by APARTHEID. The straight definition is "bigotry", and the wordplay explains itself, indicated by the word "take" (since one word "takes" another): "aside" means APART and I'd is simply ID, so APART and ID "take" HE (which is, in cryptic crossword usage, a perfectly good synonym for "him"). The answer could be elucidated as APART(HE)ID.

Another common clue type is the "hidden clue" or "container", where the answer is hidden in the text of the clue itself. For example, "Made a dug-out, buried, and passed away (4)" is solved by DEAD. The answer is written in the clue: "maDE A Dug-out". "Buried" indicates that the answer is embedded within the clue.

There are numerous other forms of wordplay found in cryptic clues. Backwards words can be indicated by words like "climbing", "retreating", or "ascending" (depending on whether it is an across clue or a down clue) or by directional indicators such as "going North" (meaning upwards) or "West" (right-to-left); letters can be replaced or removed with indicators such as "nothing rather than excellence" (meaning replace E in a word with O); the letter I can be indicated by "me" or "one;" the letter O can be indicated by "nought", "nothing", "zero", or "a ring" (since it visually resembles one); the letter X might be clued as "a cross", or "ten" (as in the Roman numeral), or "an illiterate's signature", or "sounds like your old flame" (homophone for "ex"). "Senselessness" is solved by "e", because "e" is what remains after removing (less) "ness" from "sense".

With the different types of wordplay and definition possibilities, the composer of a cryptic puzzle is presented with many different possible ways to clue a given answer. Most desirable are clues that are clean but deceptive, with a smooth surface reading (that is, the resulting clue looks as natural a phrase as possible). The Usenet newsgroup rec.puzzles.crosswords has a number of clueing competitions where contestants all submit clues for the same word and a judge picks the best one.

In principle, each cryptic clue is usually sufficient to define its answer uniquely, so it should be possible to answer each clue without use of the grid. In practice, the use of checks is an important aid to the solver.

== Other variants ==
These are common crossword variants that vary more from a regular crossword than just an unusual grid shape or unusual clues; these crossword variants may be based on different solving principles and require a different solving skill set.

=== Cipher crosswords ===
Cipher crosswords were invented in Germany in the 19th century. Published under various trade names (including Code Breakers, Code Crackers, and Kaidoku), and not to be confused with cryptic crosswords (ciphertext puzzles are commonly known as cryptograms), a cipher crossword replaces the clues for each entry with clues for each white cell of the grid—an integer from 1 to 26 inclusive is printed in the corner of each. The objective, as any other crossword, is to determine the proper letter for each cell; in a cipher crossword, the 26 numbers serve as a cipher for those letters: cells that share matching numbers are filled with matching letters, and no two numbers stand for the same letter. All resultant entries must be valid words. Usually, at least one number's letter is given at the outset. English-language cipher crosswords are nearly always pangrammatic (all letters of the alphabet appear in the solution). As these puzzles are closer to codes than quizzes, they require a different skillset; many basic cryptographic techniques, such as determining likely vowels, are key to solving these. Given their pangrammaticity, a frequent start point is locating where 'Q' and 'U' must appear.

=== Diagramless crosswords ===
In a diagramless crossword, often called a diagramless for short or, in the UK, a skeleton crossword or carte blanche, the grid offers overall dimensions, but the locations of most of the clue numbers and shaded squares are unspecified. A solver must deduce not only the answers to individual clues, but how to fit together partially built-up clumps of answers into larger clumps with properly set shaded squares. Some of these puzzles follow the traditional symmetry rule, others have left-right mirror symmetry, and others have greater levels of symmetry or outlines suggesting other shapes. If the symmetry of the grid is given, the solver can use it to his/her advantage.

=== Fill-in crosswords ===
A fill-in crossword (also known as crusadex or cruzadex) features a grid and the full list of words to be entered in that grid, but does not give explicit clues for where each word goes. The challenge is figuring out how to integrate the list of words together within the grid so that all intersections of words are valid. Fill-in crosswords may often have longer word length than regular crosswords to make the crossword easier to solve, and symmetry is often disregarded. Fitting together several long words is easier than fitting together several short words because there are fewer possibilities for how the long words intersect together. These types of crosswords are also used to demonstrate artificial intelligence abilities, such as finding solutions to the puzzle based on a set of determined constraints.

=== Cross-figures ===
A cross-figure or crossnumber is the numerical analogy of a crossword, in which the solutions to the clues are numbers instead of words. Clues are usually arithmetical expressions, but can also be general knowledge clues to which the answer is a number or year. There are also numerical fill-in crosswords.

The first known crossnumber puzzle was created by Henry Dudeney and published in the Strand Magazine in 1926.

=== Acrostic puzzles ===
An acrostic is a type of word puzzle, in eponymous acrostic form, that typically consists of two parts. The first is a set of lettered clues, each of which has numbered blanks representing the letters of the answer. The second part is a long series of numbered blanks and spaces, representing a quotation or other text, into which the answers for the clues fit. In most forms of the puzzle, the first letters of each correct clue answer, read in order from clue A on down the list, will spell out the author of the quote and the title of the work it is taken from; this can be used as an additional solving aid.

=== Arroword ===
The arroword is a variant of a crossword that does not have as many black squares as a true crossword, but has arrows inside the grid, with clues preceding the arrows. It has been called the most popular word puzzle in many European countries, and is often called the Scandinavian crossword, as it is believed to have originated in Sweden.

== History ==
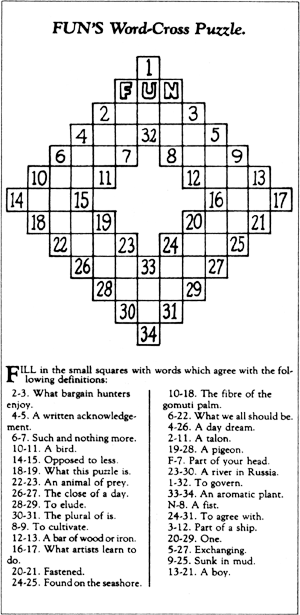
Recreation of Arthur Wynne's original crossword puzzle from December 21, 1913

The phrase "cross word puzzle" was first written in 1862 by Our Young Folks in the United States. Crossword-like puzzles, for example Double Diamond Puzzles, appeared in the magazine St. Nicholas, published since 1873. Another crossword puzzle appeared on September 14, 1890, in the Italian magazine Il Secolo Illustrato della Domenica. It was designed by Giuseppe Airoldi and titled "Per passare il tempo" ("To pass the time"). Airoldi's puzzle was a four-by-four grid with no shaded squares; it included horizontal and vertical clues.

Crosswords in England during the 19th century were of an elementary kind, apparently derived from the word square, a group of words arranged so the letters read alike vertically and horizontally, and printed in children's puzzle books and various periodicals.

On December 21, 1913, Arthur Wynne, a journalist born in Liverpool, England, published a "word-cross" puzzle in the New York World that embodied most of the features of the modern genre. This puzzle is frequently cited as the first crossword puzzle, and Wynne as the inventor. An illustrator later reversed the "word-cross" name to "cross-word".

Crossword puzzles became a regular weekly feature in the New York World, and spread to other newspapers; the Pittsburgh Press, for example, was publishing them at least as early as 1916 and The Boston Globe by 1917.

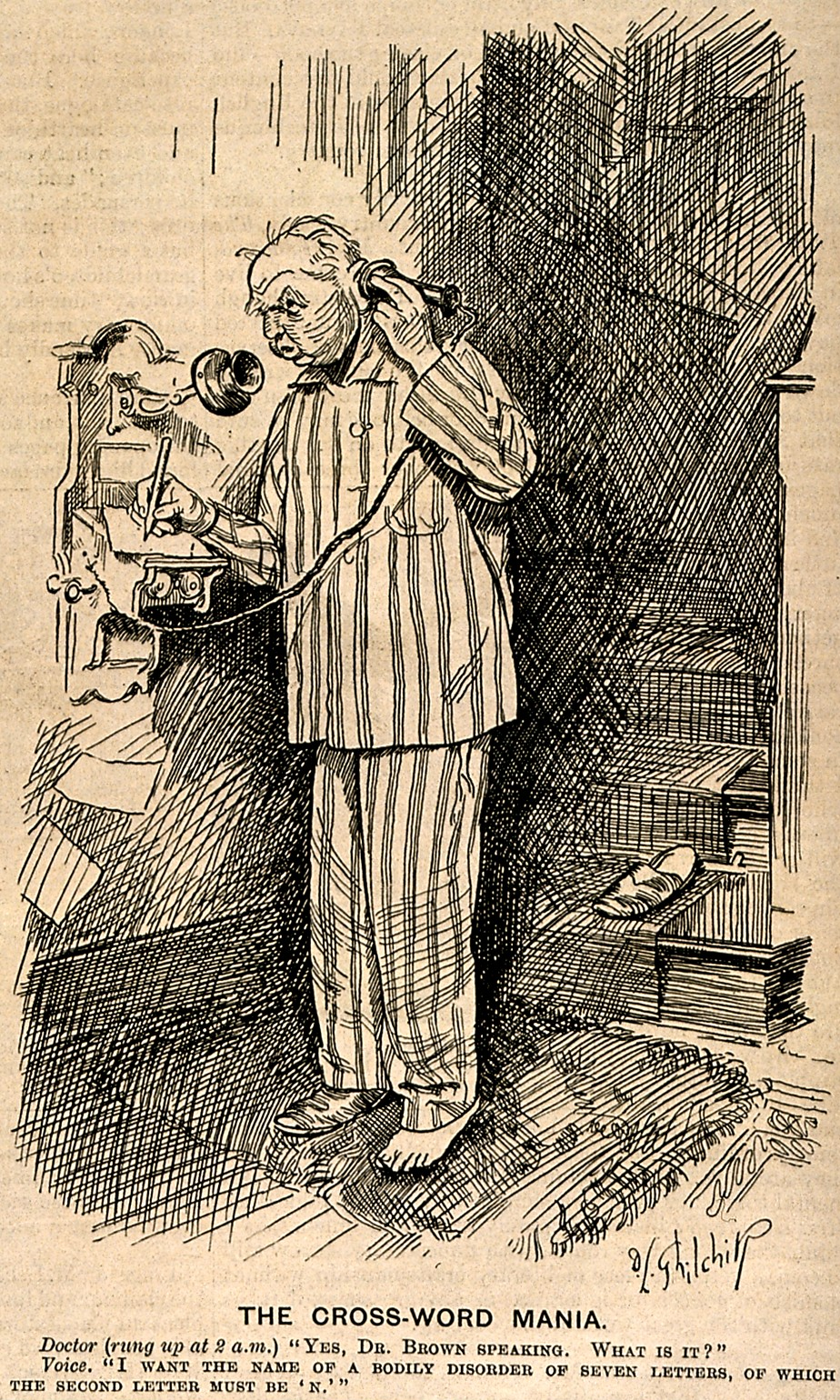
A 1925 Punch cartoon about "The Cross-Word Mania". A person phones a doctor in the middle of the night, asking for "the name of a bodily disorder of seven letters, of which the second letter must be 'N'".

By the 1920s, the crossword phenomenon was starting to attract notice. In October 1922, newspapers published a comic strip by Clare Briggs entitled "Movie of a Man Doing the Cross-Word Puzzle", with an enthusiast muttering "87 across 'Northern Sea Bird'!!??!?!!? Hm-m-m starts with an 'M', second letter is 'U' ... I'll look up all the words starting with an 'M-U ...' mus-musi-mur-murd—Hot Dog! Here 'tis! Murre!" In 1923 a humorous squib in The Boston Globe has a wife ordering her husband to run out and "rescue the papers ... the part I want is blowing down the street." "What is it you're so keen about?" "The Cross-Word Puzzle. Hurry, please, that's a good boy." In The New Yorker's inaugural issue, from 1925, the "Jottings About Town" section observed, "Judging from the number of solvers in the subway and 'L' trains, the crossword puzzle bids fair to become a fad with New Yorkers." In 1922, the New York Public Library reported that "The latest craze to strike libraries is the crossword puzzle", and complained that when "the puzzle 'fans' swarm to the dictionaries and encyclopedias so as to drive away readers and students who need these books in their daily work, can there be any doubt of the Library's duty to protect its legitimate readers?"

The first book of crossword puzzles was published by Simon & Schuster in 1924, after a suggestion from co-founder Richard Simon's aunt. The publisher was initially skeptical that the book would succeed, and only printed a small run at first. The book was promoted with an included pencil, and "This odd-looking book with a pencil attached to it" was an instant hit, leading crossword puzzles to become a craze of 1924. To help promote its books, Simon & Schuster also founded the Amateur Cross Word Puzzle League of America, which began the process of developing standards for puzzle design.

Not all of the attention drawn to the crossword puzzle fad was positive: A 1924 editorial in The New York Times complained of the "sinful waste in the utterly futile finding of words the letters of which will fit into a prearranged pattern, more or less complex. This is not a game at all, and it hardly can be called a sport ... [solvers] get nothing out of it except a primitive form of mental exercise, and success or failure in any given attempt is equally irrelevant to mental development." A clergyman called the working of crossword puzzles "the mark of a childish mentality" and said, "There is no use for persons to pretend that working one of the puzzles carries any intellectual value with it." However, another wrote a complete Bible Cross-Word Puzzle Book. Also in 1925, Time magazine noted that nine Manhattan dailies and fourteen other big newspapers were carrying crosswords, and quoted opposing views as to whether "This crossword craze will positively end by June!" or "The crossword puzzle is here to stay!" In 1925, The New York Times noted, with approval, a scathing critique of crosswords by The New Republic; but concluded that "Fortunately, the question of whether the puzzles are beneficial or harmful is in no urgent need of an answer. The craze evidently is dying out fast and in a few months it will be forgotten." and in 1929 declared, "The cross-word puzzle, it seems, has gone the way of all fads." In 1930, a correspondent noted that "Together with The Times of London, yours is the only journal of prominence that has never succumbed to the lure of the cross-word puzzle" and said that "The craze—the fad—stage has passed, but there are still people numbering it to the millions who look for their daily cross-word puzzle as regularly as for the weather predictions."

The term "crossword" first appeared in the Oxford English Dictionary in 1933.

The New York Times finally began to publish a crossword puzzle on 15 February 1942, spurred on by the idea that the puzzle could be a welcome distraction from the harsh news of World War II. The New York Times's first puzzle editor was Margaret Petherbridge Farrar, who was editor from 1942 to 1969. She was succeeded by Will Weng, who was succeeded by Eugene T. Maleska. Since 1993, they have been edited by Will Shortz, the Times' fourth crossword editor.

Simon & Schuster continues to publish the Crossword Puzzle Book Series books that it began in 1924, currently under the editorship of John M. Samson. The original series ended in 2007 after 258 volumes. Since 2008, these books are now in the Mega series, appearing three times per year and each featuring 300 puzzles.

The cryptic crossword variation originated in Britain in the mid-1920s. Edward Powys Mathers set the first crossword to use entirely cryptic clues, originally just for the enjoyment of his friends, one of whom, without permission, submitted it to the Saturday Westminster Gazette. The editors approached Mathers for more puzzles, and published eleven more of these novel cryptic crosswords. Upon the demise of the Saturday Westminster, Mathers began setting puzzles for The Observer, beginning a series of 670 cryptic crosswords, which ended only with Mathers' death in 1939. Mathers set his puzzles under the pen name of Torquemada, after the first Grand Inquisitor of the Spanish Inquisition. His successors as The Observer cryptic crossword setter followed his example. Derrick Somerset Macnutt, who took over at Mather's death, chose the pen name "Ximenes," an Anglicization of the surname of Francisco Jiménez de Cisneros, a Grand Inquisitor in Castile. The current Observer cryptic compiler, Jonathan Crowther sets under the name "Azed," a reversal of Deza, another Grand Inquisitor. Cryptic crosswords are popular in Britain, some British Commonwealth nations, and in a few other countries. Many British newspapers publish both standard and cryptic crosswords.

The cryptic crossword was imported to the US in 1968 by composer and lyricist Stephen Sondheim in the New York magazine, but never became widespread. From 1977 to 2006, The Atlantic regularly featured a cryptic crossword "Puzzler" by the husband and wife team of Emily Cox and Henry Rathvon. From 2006 to 2009, The Atlantic puzzler appeared only online. In 2010, Cox and Rathvon's efforts began to appear monthly in The Wall Street Journal. The pair retired at the end of 2023, but the WSJ continues to offer a cryptic crossword each month.

In the United Kingdom, the Sunday Express was the first newspaper to publish a crossword on November 2, 1924, a Wynne puzzle adapted for the UK. The first crossword in Britain, according to Tony Augarde in his Oxford Guide to Word Games (1984), was in Pearson's Magazine for February 1922.

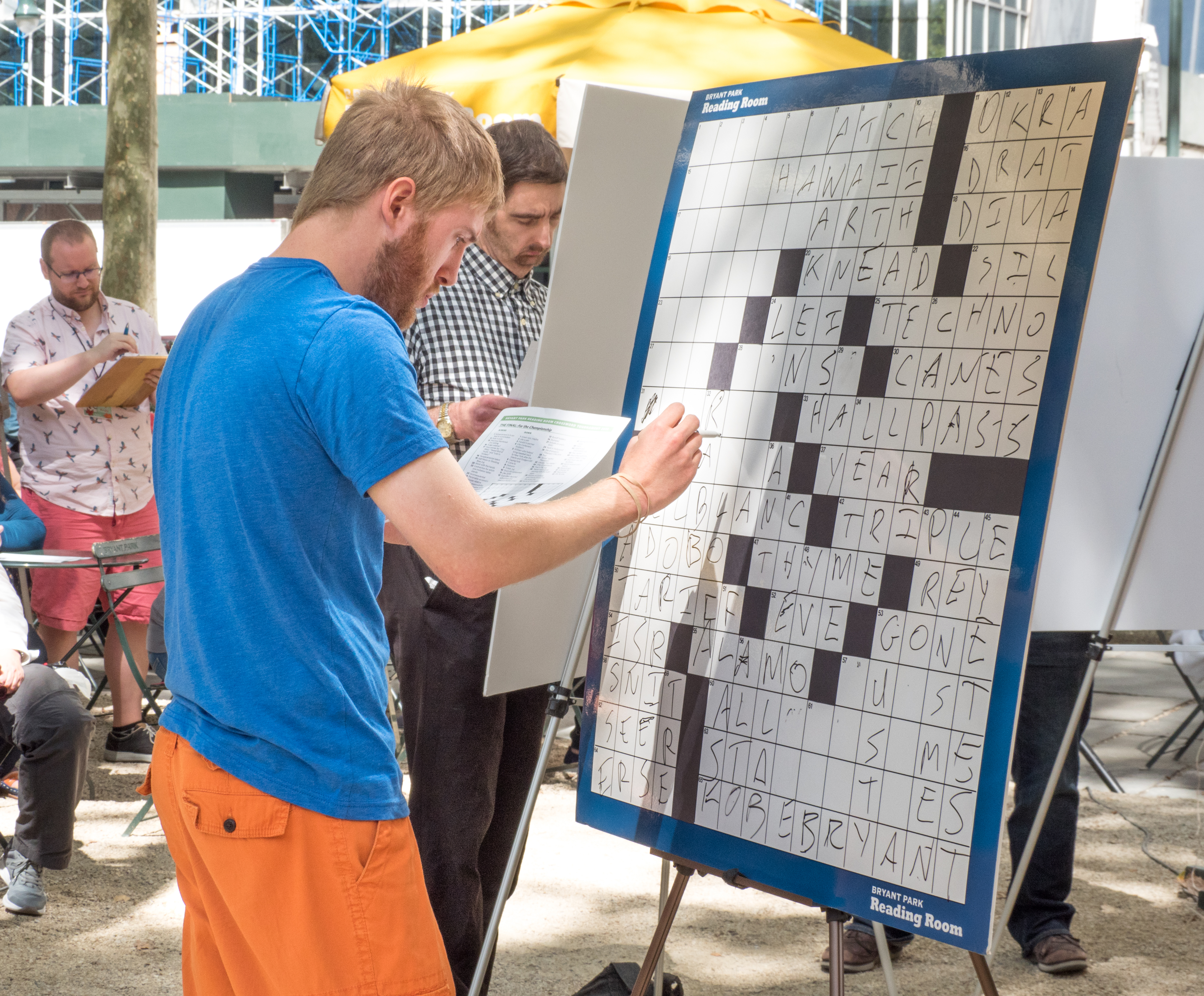
Finalists competing in a crossword competition in New York City in 2019

The 2006 documentary Wordplay, about enthusiasts of The New York Times's puzzle, increased public interest in crosswords. It highlighted attendees of Will Shortz's American Crossword Puzzle Tournament and other notable crossword enthusiasts, including former US president Bill Clinton and comedian Jon Stewart. Other crossword tournaments in the United States include Lollapuzzoola in New York City and Boswords in Boston.

=== World War II ===
In 1944, Allied security officers were disturbed by the appearance, in a series of crosswords in The Daily Telegraph, of words that were secret code names for military operations planned as part of Operation Overlord.

Some cryptologists for Bletchley Park were selected after doing well in a crossword-solving competition.

=== Records ===
According to Guinness World Records, May 15, 2007, the most prolific crossword compiler is Roger Squires of Ironbridge, Shropshire, UK. On May 14, 2007, he published his 66,666th crossword, equivalent to 2 million clues. He is one of only four setters to have provided cryptic puzzles to The Times, The Daily Telegraph, The Guardian, the Financial Times and The Independent. He also holds the record for the longest word ever used in a published crossword—the 58-letter Welsh town Llanfairpwllgwyngyllgogerychwyrndrobwllllantysiliogogogoch clued as an anagram.

Enthusiasts have compiled a number of record-setting achievements in New York Times and other venues.

- The lowest word count in a published weekday-size 15x15 puzzle is the June 29, 2013 The New York Times crossword by Joe Krozel, with just 50 words.
- The fewest shaded squares in a 15x15 American crossword is 17 (leaving 208 white spaces), set by the July 27, 2012 Times crossword by Joe Krozel.
- A N Prahlada Rao, crossword constructor from India, has recorded in the Limca Book of Records in 2016 for constructing highest number of crosswords in Indian regional languages. In 2019 his name has mentioned in the Kalam Book of World Records.

In 2024, Régis Petit published the largest crossword grids designed without black squares (12×12, 11×11, 10×10, and 9×9 grids) known in French, English, Italian, Spanish, Latin, Serbian, Croatian, Hungarian, Hebrew, and German.

=== Female crossword constructors ===
Women editors such as Margaret Farrar were influential in the first few decades of puzzle-making, and women constructors such as Bernice Gordon and Elizabeth Gorski have each contributed hundreds of puzzles to The New York Times. However, in recent years the number of women constructors has declined. During the years that Will Weng and Eugene Maleska edited the New York Times crossword (1969–1993), women constructors accounted for 35% of puzzles, while during the editorship of Will Shortz (1993–present), this percentage has gone down, with women constructors (including collaborations) accounting for only 15% of puzzles in both 2014 and 2015, 17% of puzzles published in 2016, 13%—the lowest in the "Shortz Era"—in 2017, and 16% in 2018. Several reasons have been given for the decline in women constructors. One explanation is that the gender imbalance in crossword construction is similar to that in related fields, such as journalism, and that more freelance male constructors than females submit puzzles on spec to The New York Times and other outlets. Another explanation is that computer-assisted construction and the increased influence of computational approaches in generating word lists may be making crossword construction more like STEM fields in which women are underrepresented for a number of factors. However, it has also been argued that this explanation risks propagating myths about gender and technology. Some have argued that the relative absence of women constructors and editors has had an influence on the content of the puzzles themselves, and that clues and entries can be insensitive regarding language related to gender and race. Margaret Irvine suggested that lack of confidence was a barrier. Several approaches have been suggested to develop more women in the field, including mentoring novice women constructors and encouraging women constructors to publish their puzzles independently.

Crossword venues other than New York Times have recently published higher percentages of women than that puzzle. In the spring of 2018, Patti Varol and Amy Reynaldo organized and edited a pack of 18 puzzles constructed by women called "Women of Letters". Inspired by this, Laura Braunstein and Tracy Bennett launched The Inkubator, a "twice-monthly subscription service that will publish crosswords constructed by cis women, trans women, and woman-aligned constructors." The Inkubator raised over $30,000 in its initial Kickstarter campaign, and began publishing puzzles on January 17, 2019. A book of 100 puzzles, Inkubator Crosswords: 100 Audacious Puzzles by Women and Nonbinary Creators, was published in 2022. On February 8, 2023, they announced to subscribers that 2023 would be their final year as a subscription service.

== Non-English languages ==
Owing to the large number of words ending with a vowel, Italian crossword-makers have perhaps the most difficult task. The right margin and the bottom can be particularly difficult to put together. From such a perspective, Swedish crossword-makers have a far easier task. Especially in the large picture crosswords, both conjugation of verbs and declension of adjectives and nouns are allowed. A Swedish clue like "kan sättas i munnen" = "sked" ("can be put in the mouth" = "spoon") can be grammatically changed; "den kan sättas i munnen" = "skeden" ("it can be put in the mouth" = "the spoon"), as the definite form of a noun includes declension.

=== Orthography ===
From their origin in New York, crosswords have spread to many countries and languages. In languages other than English, the status of diacritics varies according to the orthography of the particular language, thus:

- in Afrikaans all diacritical markings are ignored. Words such as TEË (meaning opposed) and TEE (meaning tea) are both simply written TEE. The same goes for SÊ (say) and SE (belonging to) and many others.
- in Czech and Slovak, diacritics are respected and ch, being considered one letter, occupies one square.
- in Dutch crosswords, the ij digraph is considered one letter, filling one square, and the IJ and the Y (see Dutch alphabet) are considered distinct. Rules may vary in other word games.
- in Esperanto crosswords, diacritics are respected, as they form separate letters (graphemes).
- in French, in Spanish and in Italian, accent marks and most other diacritical markings are ignored, except the tilde in Spanish: for instance, in French, the final E of answer ÊTRE can double as the final É of CONGÉ when written ETRE and CONGE; but in Spanish, N and Ñ are distinct letters.
- In Frisian diacritics are fully respected.
- in German language crosswords, the umlauts ä, ö, and ü are dissolved into ae, oe, and ue, and ß is dissolved into ss.
- in Hungarian, diacritics are either fully respected, or not respected where they denote length: that is I/Í, O/Ó, Ö/Ő, U/Ú, Ü/Ű are considered the same, but not A/Á and E/É which mark different sounds; although the difference between the short/long pairs of letters is a distinctive feature in Hungarian. Digraphs fill two squares.
- in Irish crosswords, the accents on Á É Í Ó Ú are all respected, so (for example) the Í in SÍB cannot double as the I in SLIABH.
- in Latin, diacritics are ignored. Therefore, A is considered the same as Ă or Ā. Ecclesiastical Latin is normally used. See the monthly magazine of Latin crosswords Hebdomada Aenigmatum as a reference.
- in Portuguese, diacritics are ignored with the exception of Ç. Therefore, A could be checked with Ã or Á.
- in Romanian, diacritics are ignored.
- in Russian, Ё doubles as Е but Й is considered different from И; the soft sign Ь and the hard sign Ъ occupy a separate square, different from that of the previous letter.
- in Spanish crosswords, the digraphs ch and ll fill two squares, although in some old crosswords (from prior to the 1996 spelling reform) they filled one square.

=== Grid design, clues, and conventions ===
Japanese-style

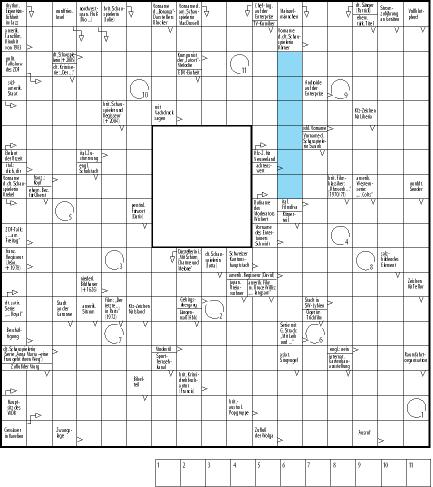
Swedish-style

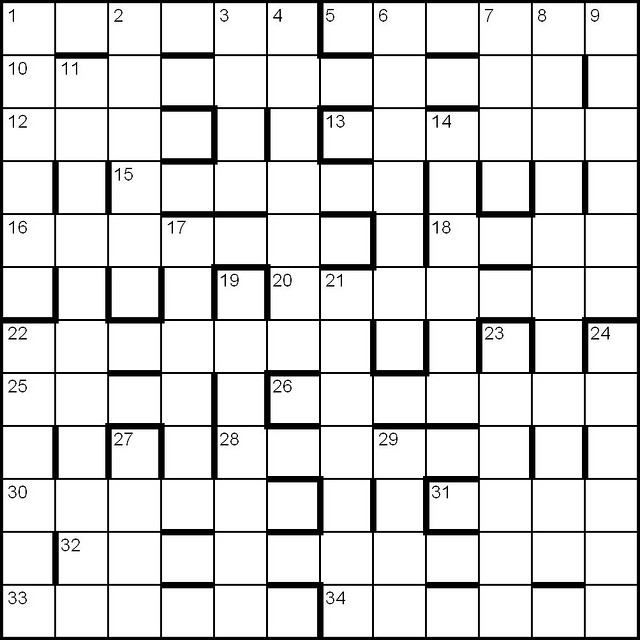
Barred grid where bold bars are used instead of shaded blocks to separate the words

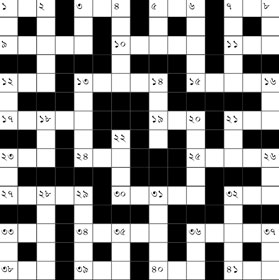
A Bengali crossword grid

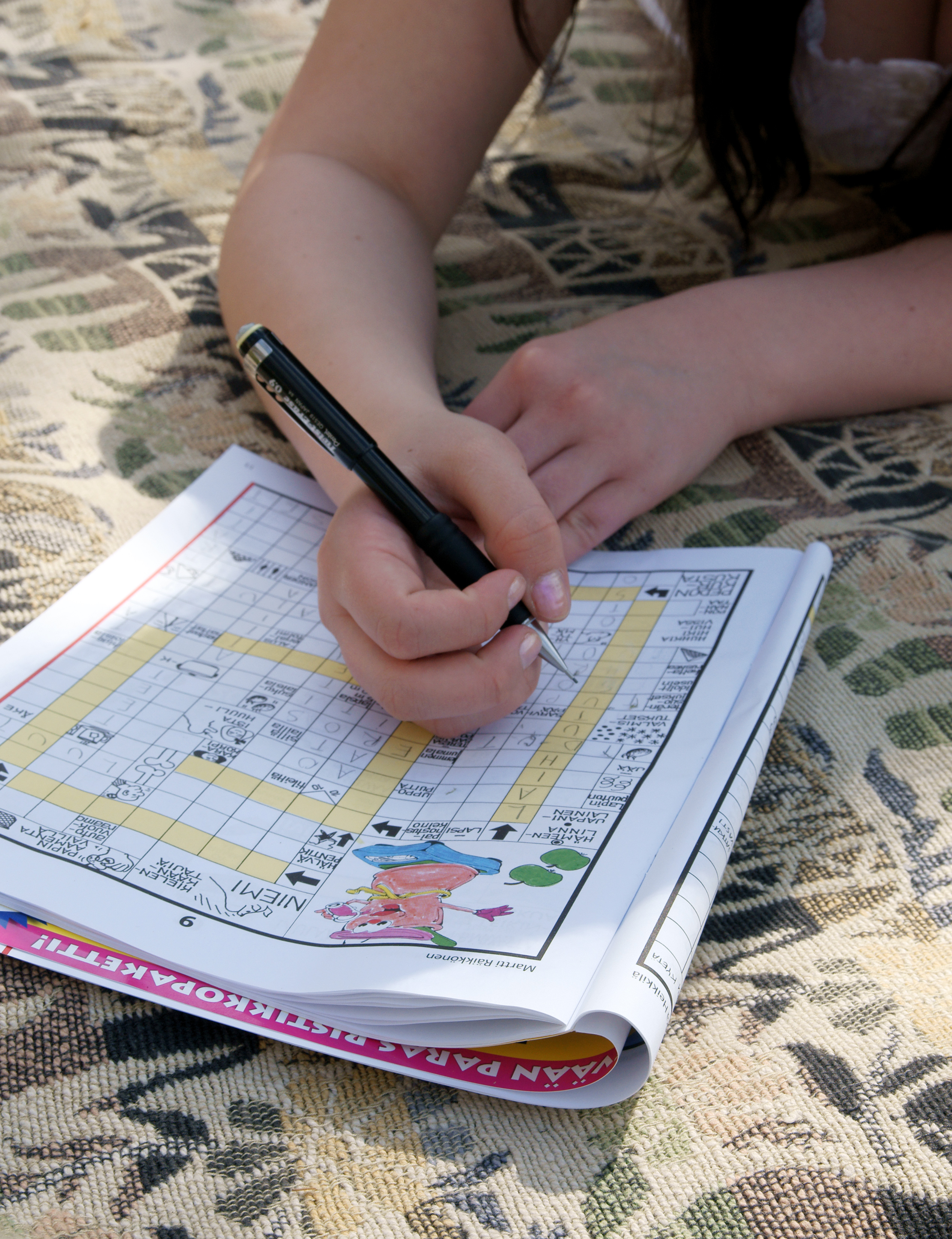
Person solving a Finnish crossword puzzle

French-language crosswords are smaller than English-language ones, and not necessarily square: there are usually 8–13 rows and columns, totaling 81–130 squares. They need not be symmetric and two-letter words are allowed, unlike in most English-language puzzles. Compilers strive to minimize use of shaded squares. A black-square usage of 10% is typical; Georges Perec compiled many 9×9 grids for Le Point with four or even three black squares. Rather than numbering the individual clues, the rows and columns are numbered as on a chessboard. All clues for a given row or column are listed, against its number, as separate sentences.

In Italy, crosswords are usually oblong and larger than French ones, 13×21 being a common size. As in France, they usually are not symmetrical; two-letter words are allowed; and the number of shaded squares is minimized. Nouns (including surnames) and the infinitive or past participle of verbs are allowed, as are abbreviations; in larger crosswords, it is customary to put at the center of the grid phrases made of two to four words, or forenames and surnames. A variant of Italian crosswords does not use shaded squares: words are delimited by thickening the grid. Another variant starts with a blank grid: the solver must insert both the answers and the shaded squares, and across and down clues are either ordered by row and column or not ordered at all.

Modern Hebrew is normally written with only the consonants; vowels are either understood, or entered as diacritical marks. This can lead to ambiguities in the entry of some words, and compilers generally specify that answers are to be entered in ktiv male (with some vowels) or ktiv haser (without vowels). Further, since Hebrew is written from right to left, but Roman numerals are used and written from left to right, there can be an ambiguity in the description of lengths of entries, particularly for multi-word phrases. Different compilers and publications use differing conventions for both of these issues.

In the Japanese language crossword; because of the writing system, one syllable (typically katakana) is entered into each white cell of the grid rather than one letter, resulting in the typical solving grid seeming small in comparison to those of other languages. Any second Yōon character is treated as a full syllable and is rarely written with a smaller character. Even cipher crosswords have a Japanese equivalent, although pangrammaticity does not apply. Crosswords with kanji to fill in are also produced, but in far smaller number as it takes far more effort to construct one. Despite Japanese having three writing forms – hiragana, katakana, and kanji – they are rarely mixed in a single crossword puzzle. The design of Japanese crossword grids often follows two additional rules: that shaded cells may not share a side (i.e. they may not be orthogonally contiguous) and that the corner squares must be white.

A. N. Prahlada Rao, based in Bangalore, has composed/ constructed some 50,000 crossword puzzles in the language Kannada, including 7,500 crosswords based on films made in Kannada, with a total of 13,00,000 (thirteen lakhs, or 1.3 million) clues. His name was recorded in the Limca Book Of Records in 2015 for creating the highest number of crosswords in any Indian Regional Language. He continued to hold this title through 2016 and 2017. In 2008, a five volume set of his puzzles was released, followed by 7 more volumes in 2017. Bengali is also well known for its crossword puzzles. Crosswords are published regularly in most Bengali dailies and periodicals. The grid system is similar to the British style and two-letter words are usually not allowed.

In Turkey, crosswords (kare bulmaca for standard grids, çengel bulmaca for arrow-style grids) are widely published in daily newspapers such as Cumhuriyet, Hürriyet, Milliyet, and Sözcü. Turkish crosswords commonly allow two-letter answers (e.g., chemical symbols or musical notes), and clues sometimes contain the answer's root (e.g., cluing kanalet "small canal" with a clue containing kanal). Grids are typically not required to be symmetrical, and formulaic clues such as "Bir ilimiz" ("One of our provinces") are common. These conventions contrast with New York Times-style rules, which prohibit two-letter entries, require diagonal symmetry, and emphasize creative clueing.

In Poland, crosswords typically use British-style grids, but some do not have shaded cells. Shaded cells are often replaced by boxes with clues—such crosswords are called Swedish puzzles or Swedish-style crosswords. In a vast majority of Polish crosswords, nouns are the only allowed words.

Swedish crosswords are mainly in the illustrated (photos or drawings), in-line clue style typical of the "Swedish-style grid". The "Swedish-style" grid (picture crosswords) uses no clue numbers. Instead, clues are contained in the cells which do not contain answers, with arrows indicating where and in what direction to fill in answers. Arrows can be omitted from clue cells, in which case the convention is for the answer to go horizontally to the right of the clue cell, or – if the clue cell is split vertically and contains two clues – for the answer to go horizontally to the right for the top clue and vertically below for the bottom clue. This style of grid is also used in several countries other than Sweden, often in magazines, but also in daily newspapers. The grid often has one or more photos replacing a block of squares as a clue to one or several answers; for example, the name of a pop star, or some kind of rhyme or phrase that can be associated with the photo. These puzzles usually have no symmetry in the grid but instead often have a common theme (literature, music, nature, geography, events of a special year, etc.) This tradition prospered already in the mid-1900s, in family magazines and sections of newspapers. Then the specialised magazines took off. Around the turn of the millennium, approximately half a dozen Swedish magazine publishers produced specialised crossword magazines, totaling more than twenty titles, often published on a monthly basis. The oldest extant crossword magazine published in Swedish is Krysset (from Bonnier), founded in 1957. Additionally, nearly all newspapers publish crosswords of some kind, and at weekends often devote specialised sections in the paper to crosswords and similar type of pastime material. Both major evening dailies (Aftonbladet and Expressen) publish a weekly crossword supplement, named Kryss & Quiz and Korsord respectively. Both are available as paid supplements on Mondays and Tuesdays, as part of the ongoing competition between the two newspapers.

== Construction ==
=== American-style crosswords ===
In typical themed American-style crosswords, the theme is created first, as a set of symmetric long across answers will be needed around which the grid can be created. Since the grid will typically have 180-degree rotational symmetry, the answers will need to be also: thus a typical 15×15 square American puzzle might have two 15-letter entries and two 13-letter entries that could be arranged appropriately in the grid (e.g., one 15-letter entry in the third row, and the other symmetrically in the 13th row; one 13-letter entry starting in the first square of the 6th row and the other ending in the last square of the 10th row). The theme must not only be funny or interesting, but also internally consistent. In the April 26, 2005 puzzle by Sarah Keller mentioned above, the five themed entries contained in the different parts of a tree: SQUAREROOT, TABLELEAF, WARDROBETRUNK, BRAINSTEM, and BANKBRANCH. In this puzzle, CHARTER OAK would not be an appropriate entry, as all the other entries contain different parts of a tree, not the name of a kind of tree. Similarly, FAMILY TREE would not be appropriate unless it were used as a revealer for the theme (frequently clued with a phrase along the lines "... and a hint to ..."). Given the existing entries, SEED MONEY would also be unacceptable, as all the other theme entries end in the part of a tree as opposed to beginning with it, though the puzzle could certainly be changed to have a mix of words in different positions.

Once a consistent, appropriate theme has been chosen, a grid is designed around that theme, following a set of basic principles:

- Generally, most American puzzles are 15×15 squares; if another size, they typically have an odd number of rows and columns: e.g., 21×21 for "Sunday-size" puzzles; Games magazine will accept 17×17 puzzles, Simon & Schuster accepts both 17×17 and 19×19 puzzles, and The New York Times requires diagramless puzzles to be 17×17. The odd number of squares on a side ensures that achieving symmetry is easier; with even-numbered puzzles the central block of four squares makes constructing a symmetrical puzzle considerably more difficult.
- The black squares must be arranged so as to (1) ensure there are no two-letter words; (2) form 180-degree rotational symmetry (so that if the grid is turned upside-down, the pattern of black squares remains the same); (3) ensure that every letter is checked (appears in both an across and a down word); (4) not occupy too much of the puzzle (generally speaking, 16% of the puzzle is considered a rough limit for the percentage of black squares); (5) ensure that the entire puzzle has "all-over interlock"—that is, that the black squares do not "cut" the puzzle into separate sections; and (6) ensure that (generally) no non-theme entry is longer than any of the theme entries. In addition, it is considered advisable to minimize the number of so-called "cheater" black squares, i.e., black squares whose removal would not change the word count of the puzzle but which make it easier to fill by shortening the length of the words therein.
- The grid is then filled with suitable words, keeping in mind that (1) no word can be repeated in the grid (with the exception of prepositions or articles); (2) profanity or graphic or "unpleasant" words are generally not allowed; (3) obscurity is strongly discouraged in easy puzzles and should be kept to a minimum in more difficult puzzles, where two obscure words should never be allowed to cross (known in crossword jargon as a "Natick")(and, ideally, where the obscure word would be of interest to most solvers—a genus of little-known water bugs would not be a good choice); (4) uncommon abbreviations and variant foreign spellings should be avoided, as well as the use of crosswordese (those words that no longer appear in common speech but that occur frequently in crosswords due to their favorable letter combinations, such as the Asian buffalo ANOA); (5) in modern puzzles, pop figures and corporate and brand names are generally considered acceptable; (6) no made-up words are permitted—there should be a dictionary or other reference that can cite each entry if asked.
- Modern constructors frequently (although not always) use software to speed up the task. Several programs are available, of which the most widely accepted is Crossword Compiler. These programs, although they cannot create themes and cannot distinguish between "good" fill (fun, interesting words vs. dull obscurity), do speed up the process and will allow the constructor to realize if they have hit a dead end.

Crossword puzzle payments for standard 15×15 puzzles from the major outlets range from $50 (Games) to $500 (The New York Times) while payments for 21×21 puzzles range from $250 (Newsday) to $1,500 (The New York Times).

The compensation structure of crosswords generally entails authors selling all rights to their puzzles upon publication, and as a result receiving no royalties from republication of their work in books or other forms.

== Software ==
Software that aids in creating crossword puzzles has been written since at least 1976; one popular example was Crossword Magic for the Apple II in the 1980s. The earliest software relied on people to input a list of fill words and clues, and automatically maps the answers onto a suitable grid. This is a search problem in computer science because there are many possible arrangements to be checked against the rules of construction. Any given set of answers might have zero, one, or multiple legal arrangements.

In the late 1990s, the transition began from mostly hand-created arrangements to computer-assisted, which creators generally say has allowed authors to produce more interesting and creative puzzles, reducing crosswordese.

Modern software includes large databases of clues and answers, allowing the computer to randomly select words for the puzzle, potentially with guidance from the user as to the theme or a specific set of words to pick with greater probability. Many serious users add words to the database as an expression of personal creativity or for use in a desired theme. Software can also be used to assist the user in finding words for a specific spot in an arrangement by quickly searching through the dictionary for all words that fit.

In 1998 in Jakarta, publisher Elex Media Komputindo (Gramedia Group) published a crossword software entitled "Teka-Teki Silang Komputer" (Computerized Crossword Puzzle [Eng]) in diskette form. It is the first Crossword Puzzle software published in Indonesia. Created by Sukmono Bayu Adhi, the software is archived in the National Library of the Republic of Indonesia (Salemba Library, Jakarta).

== Notation ==
Originally Petherbridge called the two dimensions of the crossword puzzle "Horizontal" and "Vertical". Among various numbering schemes, the standard became that in which only the start squares of each word were numbered, from left to right and top to bottom. "1 Horizontal" and "1 Vertical" and the like were names for the clues, the cross words, or the grid locations, interchangeably.

Later in the Times these terms commonly became "across" and "down" and notations for clues could either use the words or the letters "A" and "D", with or without hyphens.

== See also ==
- Bananagrams
- Cross Sums
- Crosswordese
- Merv Griffin's Crosswords, a crossword-based game show that debuted in fall 2007
- People Puzzler, a game show based on the pop-culture crossword puzzles in People Magazine, currently airing on Game Show Network
- Scrabble (see also Scrabble variants)
- Sudoku
- The Cross-Wits, a crossword-based game show that ran in the 1970s and 1980s
- Upwords
- Wheel of Fortune, a letter-based game show that incorporated crosswords in 2016
- Word search
- Wordplay, a 2006 documentary film about crossword puzzles
