= Timothy Parker (puzzle designer) =

American puzzle editor

Timothy Eric Parker is an American puzzle editor, games creator, author, and TV producer.

== Puzzle career ==
In November 1996, Parker started writing a "Daily Crossword" feature. By early 1997, Parker’s puzzle became the "Universal Crossword" syndicated by Universal Press Syndicate to newspapers and clients worldwide. In 1999, together with Universal Press Syndicate’s Uclick division, Parker founded The Puzzle Society, and is the founder and senior editor of the Universal Uclick line of crossword puzzles and games. On May 19, 2003, Parker became the second crossword editor of USA Today, following Charles Preston. In summer of 2003, Parker created the "Family Time Crossword".

== Plagiarism scandal ==
On March 4, 2016, the website FiveThirtyEight, in an article by Oliver Roeder, reported that "a group of eagle-eyed puzzlers" had found similarities between 1,537 of the 15,000 puzzles Parker had edited and published through USA Today and Universal Uclick and ones published by The New York Times and other publishers. Ninety-two were similar to ones published by The New York Times and in 699 cases, the previous publisher was either USA Today or Universal.

Parker said he had not deliberately copied any puzzles, and that the repeated themes were coincidental. On March 7, Universal Uclick and USA Today issued statements saying that Parker had temporarily stepped down from his role as senior editor while an investigation into the plagiarism allegations was underway.

On April 18, 2016, Universal Uclick confirmed some of the allegations and said that Parker would take a three-month leave of absence. He would use "the best available technology to ensure that everything he edits is original". On May 10, 2016, USA Today announced that it would not publish any future puzzles from Timothy Parker, although it would continue to use vendor Universal Uclick. At the end of 2018, Universal Uclick declined to renew its contract with Parker.

== Television ==
In 2006, Parker became the puzzle producer for Merv Griffin's Crosswords. According to a press release from Parker, he wrote all questions for 225 episodes singlehandedly. In 2008, Parker contributed to the ABC prime time television show The Mole. In addition, Parker has created puzzles that have appeared on The View, Access Hollywood and others.

== Books ==
Parker has written or edited over 50 books, a series of puzzle books for the For Dummies brand, 25 digital games, the annual USA Today Crossword Calendar, and the syndicated Family Time Crossword.

In 2014, Parker co-wrote The Book of Revelation Made Clear with Tim LaHaye, co-creator of the Left Behind series. In 2016, Parker wrote Bible Brilliant, a Bible trivia book published through Baker Publishing.

== Awards and recognition ==
In May 2000, Parker was named "World's Most Syndicated Puzzle Compiler" by Guinness World Records.
