= Will Weng =

American crossword puzzle constructor

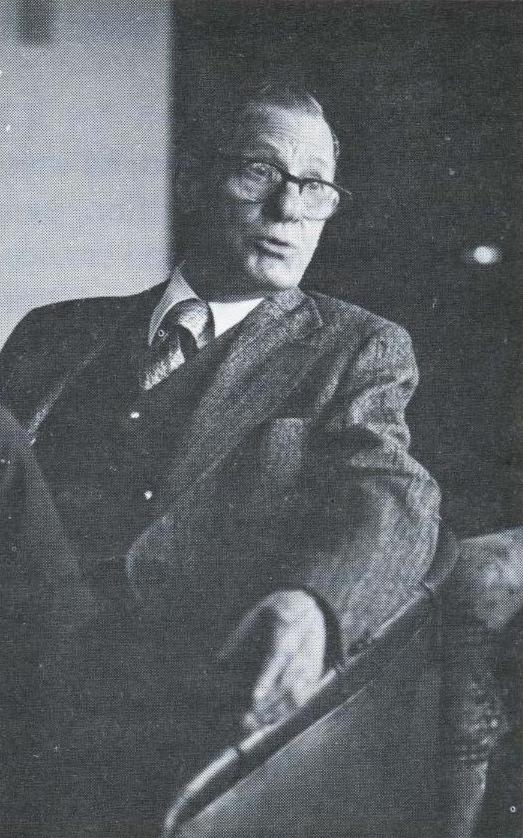
- Weng c. 1974
- Born: February 25, 1907; Terre Haute, Indiana, U.S.
- Died: May 2, 1993 (aged 86); New York City, U.S.
- Education: Columbia University Graduate School of Journalism; Indiana State University
- Occupation: Crossword puzzle editor
- Employer: The New York Times
- Predecessor: Margaret Farrar
- Successor: Eugene T. Maleska

William C. "Will" Weng (February 25, 1907 – May 2, 1993) was an American journalist and crossword puzzle constructor who was the crossword puzzle editor for The New York Times from 1969 to 1977.

Born in Terre Haute, Indiana, he attended Indiana State Teachers College. He moved to New York City in 1927. He received a master's degree from the Columbia University School of Journalism and joined the Times in 1930 as a reporter. He was a lieutenant commander in the United States Navy during World War II.

Weng occasionally assisted the New York Times puzzle editor, Margaret Farrar, and published his first crossword in the newspaper in 1963. He succeeded Farrar as crossword editor in early 1969 and was himself succeeded by Eugene T. Maleska when he retired on his 70th birthday in 1977. After leaving the New York Times he became the editor for a start-up crossword puzzle venue called The Crosswords Club, preparing five Sunday-size crosswords every month for distribution to subscribers.

Weng died of throat cancer in Manhattan.
