= Arthur Wynne =

Inventor of the modern crossword puzzle (1871–1945)

- Born: June 22, 1871; Liverpool, England
- Died: January 14, 1945 (aged 73); Clearwater, Florida, U.S.
- Citizenship: United Kingdom (1871–1945); United States (1920s–1945)
- Known for: Inventor of crossword puzzle

Arthur Wynne (/wɪn/; June 22, 1871 – January 14, 1945) was the Liverpool-born inventor of the modern crossword puzzle.

== Early life ==
Arthur Wynne was born on June 22, 1871, in Liverpool, England, and lived on Edge Lane for a time. His father was the editor of the local newspaper, the Liverpool Mercury. He emigrated to the United States on June 6, 1891, at the age of 19, settling for a time in Pittsburgh, Pennsylvania.

== Career ==
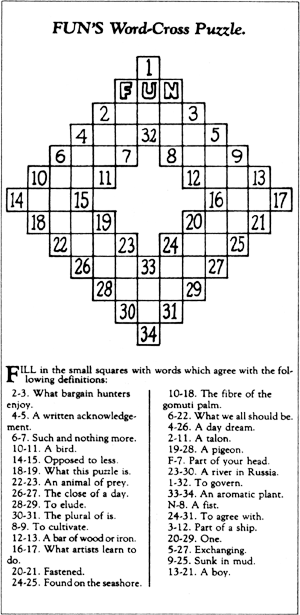
Recreation of Arthur Wynne's crossword puzzle from December 21, 1913

While in Pittsburgh, Wynne worked on the Pittsburgh Press newspaper and played the violin in the Pittsburgh Symphony Orchestra. He later moved to New York City and worked on the New York World newspaper. He is best known for the invention of the crossword puzzle in 1913, when he was a resident of Cedar Grove, New Jersey.

Wynne created the page of puzzles for the "Fun" section of the Sunday edition of the New York World. For the December 21, 1913, edition, he introduced a puzzle with a diamond shape and a hollow center, with the letters F-U-N already being filled in. He called it a "Word-Cross Puzzle."

Although Wynne's invention was based on earlier puzzle forms, such as the word diamond, he introduced a number of innovations (e.g. the use of horizontal and vertical lines to create boxes for solvers to enter letters). He subsequently pioneered the use of black squares in a symmetrical arrangement to separate words in rows and columns. With the exception of the numbering scheme, the form of Wynne's "Word-Cross" puzzles is that used for modern crosswords.

A few weeks after the first "Word-Cross" appeared, the name of the puzzle was changed to "Cross-Word" as a result of a typesetting error. Wynne's puzzles have been known as "crosswords" ever since.

== Later life and death ==
Arthur Wynne became a naturalized US citizen in the 1920s. He died in Clearwater, Florida, on January 14, 1945.

== Legacy ==
On December 20, 2013, he was honored with an interactive Google Doodle commemorating the "100th anniversary of the first crossword puzzle" with a puzzle by Merl Reagle. Numerous other constructors also created tribute puzzles to Wynne to commemorate the anniversary.
