= Eugene T. Maleska =

American crossword puzzle constructor and editor

Eugene Thomas Maleska
- Born: January 6, 1916; Jersey City, New Jersey, US
- Died: August 3, 1993 (aged 77); Daytona Beach, Florida, US
- Education: Montclair State College, B.A. and M.A. Harvard University, Ph.D.
- Employer: The New York Times
- Title: Crossword puzzle editor
- Predecessor: Will Weng
- Successor: Will Shortz

Eugene Thomas Maleska (January 6, 1916 – August 3, 1993) was an American crossword puzzle constructor and editor. He edited The New York Times crossword puzzle from 1977 to 1993.

== Early life and education career ==
Maleska was born on January 6, 1916, in Jersey City. He graduated from Regis High School in New York City. He received his bachelor's and master's degrees from Montclair State College and began his career teaching Latin and English at a junior high school in Palisades Park, New Jersey.

Maleska was an amateur poet and published a book of poems, Sun & Shadows, in 1961.

== Puzzling career ==
Before Maleska became crossword editor, The New York Times published dozens of crosswords that he had submitted as a freelance contributor. He became editor in 1977, replacing Will Weng. Besides numerous collections of puzzles, Maleska also published Maleska's Favorite Word Games and A Pleasure in Words, which included a chapter on constructing crossword puzzles. As an editor, Maleska preferred references from the classics to more familiar material. He often wrote famously mean rejection letters to aspiring constructors. In 1993, Maleska was succeeded by Will Shortz, who remains editor to this day.

== Personal life ==
He married Jean and had two children: Merryl Maleska Wilbur and Gary Maleska. Maleska married Annrea (Neill) Sutton on February 9, 1985, in Barnstable, Massachusetts. They divorced at some point and Maleska married Carol Atkinson as his third wife on March 11, 1992. Carol had previously been married. Maleska died in Daytona Beach, Florida in 1993 of throat cancer. He also had a home in Wareham, Massachusetts.
