= The Glass Key (disambiguation) =

The Glass Key is a suspense novel by Dashiell Hammett.

The Glass Key may also refer to:

- The Glass Key (1935 film), directed by Frank Tuttle and starring George Raft, Edward Arnold and Claire Dodd
- The Glass Key (1942 film), directed by Stuart Heisler and featuring Alan Ladd, Veronica Lake and Brian Donlevy
- The Glass Key, a 1959 surrealist painting by René Magritte
- The Glass Key, a stained glass store in Elkridge, Maryland

== See also ==
- Glass Key award, a literature award given annually to a crime novel by an author from the Nordic countries
