= Couffignal =

Couffignal is a surname. Notable people with the surname include:

- Hervé Couffignal (1965–2017), French rugby player
- Louis Couffignal (1902–1966), French mathematician and cyberneticist

== Other ==
- The Gutting of Couffignal, a 1925 hardboiled crime short story by Dashiell Hammett
