= The Dain Curse (miniseries) =

1978 American TV series

- Genre: Mystery crime
- Based on: The Dain Curse by Dashiell Hammett
- Written by: Robert W. Lenski
- Directed by: E. W. Swackhamer
- Starring: James Coburn; Beatrice Straight; Jean Simmons; Paul Stewart
- Composer: Charles Gross
- Country of origin: United States
- Original language: English
- No. of series: 1
- No. of episodes: 3

Production
- Producer: Martin Poll
- Cinematography: Andrew Laszlo
- Editor: Murray Solomon
- Running time: 360 minutes
- Production company: Martin Poll Productions

Original release
- Network: CBS
- Release: May 22 – May 24, 1978

The Dain Curse is a 1978 American television miniseries which originally aired on CBS in three feature-length episodes. It is an adaptation of the 1929 novel of the same title by Dashiell Hammett.

In the novel the lead character is known only as the Continental Op but for the series he is named as Hamilton Nash and played by James Coburn. It was decided to retain the 1920s period setting of the original novel, although the location was shifted from San Francisco to New York City.

Made on a budget of $5 million, it was the first time British actress Jean Simmons appeared in a miniseries. It was nominated for three times at the 1978 Primetime Emmy Awards as well as an Edgar Award.

Coburn later spoke proudly of The Dain Curse. He was quoted: "We went for a mood piece and a lot of it worked. For television, it was pretty good. Still, we had to fight the network (CBS) to make it the way we intended to do it. We didn’t want too many close-ups. They didn’t understand. They said this is television and that’s not the way to shoot it Well, I said, ‘fuck ‘em, let’s shoot it like a film’, and you know what?, we did for the most part.”

== Main cast ==
- James Coburn as Hamilton Nash (3 episodes)
- Jason Miller as Owen Fitzstephan (3 episodes)
- Paul Stewart as The Old Man (3 episodes)
- Nancy Addison as Gabrielle Leggett (3 episodes)
- Tom Bower as Sgt. O'Gar (3 episodes)
- David Canary as Jack Santos (3 episodes)
- Malachy McCourt as Mickey (3 episodes)
- Hattie Winston as Minnie Hershey (3 episodes)
- Beeson Carroll as Marshall Cotton (2 episodes)
- Martin Cassidy as Eric Collinson (2 episodes)
- Roni Dengel as Daisy Cotton (2 episodes)
- Karen Ludwig as Maria Gross (2 episodes)
- Roland Winters as Hubert Collinson (2 episodes)
- Jean Simmons as Aaronia Haldorn (2 episodes)
- Hector Elizondo as Ben Feeney (2 episodes)
- Beatrice Straight as Alice Dain Leggett (2 episodes)
- Brent Spiner as Tom Fink (2 episodes)
- Eric Brown as Manuel Haldorn (2 episodes)
- Ellis Rabb as Joseph Haldorn (2 episodes)
- Laurel Goodwin as Lily Dain Leggett (1 episode)
- Leora Dana as Mrs. Huntoon (1 episode)

== Bibliography ==
- Capua, Michelangelo. Jean Simmons: Her Life and Career. McFarland, 2022.
- Grant, John. A Comprehensive Encyclopedia of Film Noir: The Essential Reference Guide. Rowman & Littlefield, 2023.
- Phillips, Gene D. Out of the Shadows: Expanding the Canon of Classic Film Noir. Scarecrow Press, 2012.
