= Red Harvest =

1929 novel by Dashiell Hammett

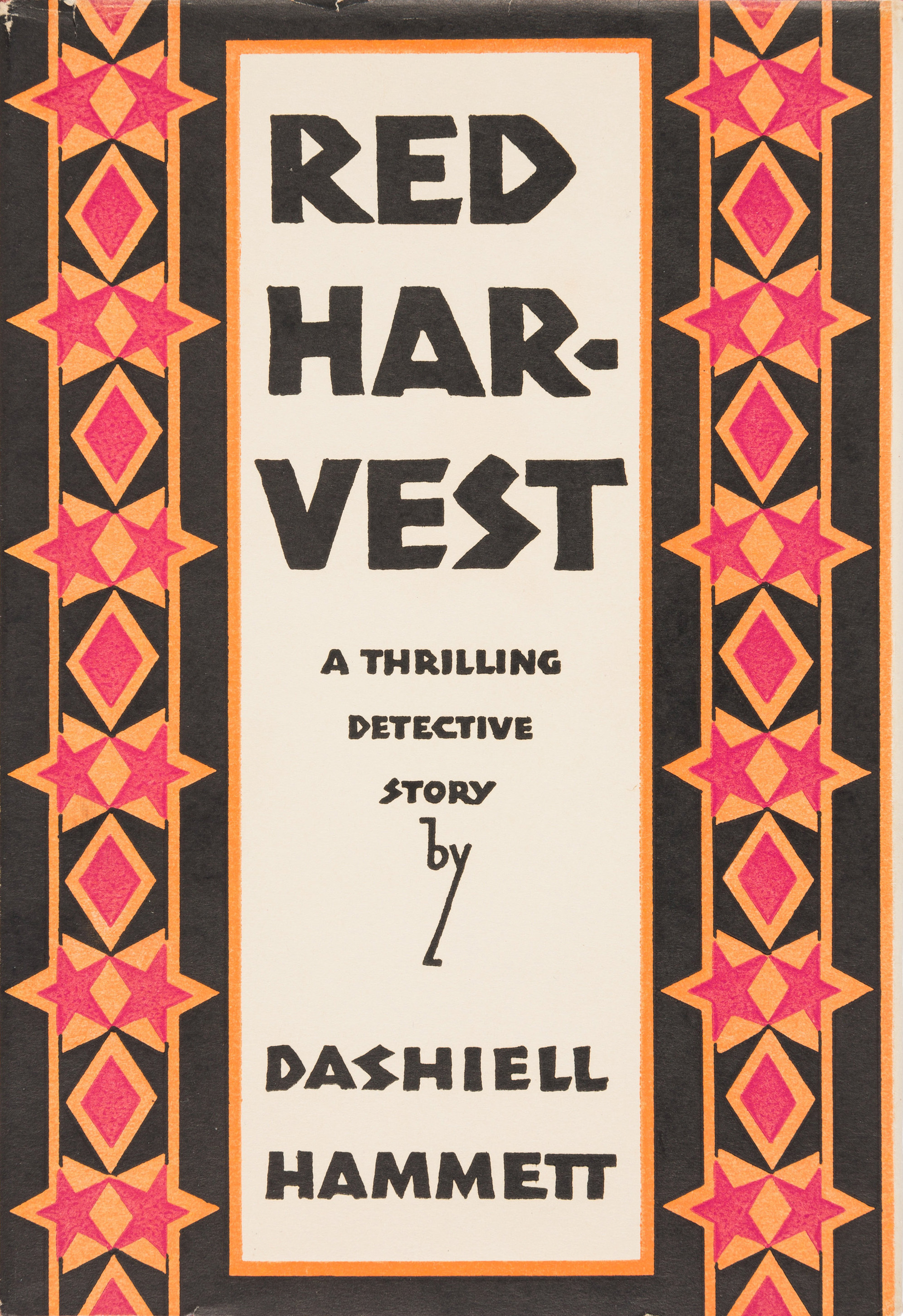
- Cover of the first edition
- Author: Dashiell Hammett
- Language: English
- Genre: Detective
- Published: February 1, 1929 (Alfred A. Knopf)
- Publication place: United States
- Media type: Print (hardcover)
- Followed by: The Dain Curse
- Text: Red Harvest online

Red Harvest is a 1929 novel by American writer Dashiell Hammett. The story is narrated by the Continental Op, a frequent character in Hammett's fiction, much of which is drawn from his own experiences as an operative of the Pinkerton Detective Agency (fictionalized as the Continental Detective Agency). The plot follows the Op's investigation of several murders in a Montana mining town, which had been taken over by gangs following a labor dispute. Some of the novel was inspired by the Anaconda Road massacre, a 1920 labor dispute in the mining town of Butte, Montana.

Time included Red Harvest in its 100 Best English-Language Novels from 1923 to 2005, noting that, in the Continental Op, Hammett "created the prototype for every sleuth who would ever be called 'hard-boiled.'" The Nobel Prize-winning author André Gide called the book "a remarkable achievement, the last word in atrocity, cynicism, and horror."

== Plot ==
The Continental Op is called to Personville (known as "Poisonville" to the locals) by the newspaper publisher Donald Willsson. Willsson had mailed the Continental Detective Agency a $5,000 check to retain their services, but Willsson is shot to death in an alley before the Op has a chance to meet with him. The Op meets Donald's wife, who is suspicious of why her husband has employed the Op. Mrs. Willsson leaves and is later seen near her husband's body immediately following his death. The Op begins to investigate Willsson's murder and meets with Willsson's father, Elihu Willsson, a local industrialist who has found his control of the city threatened by several competing gangs. Elihu had originally invited those gangs into Personville to help him impose and then enforce the end of a labor dispute. Elihu is also immediately certain that Mrs. Willsson is responsible for Donald's murder.

In addition to the $5,000 check from the late Donald Willsson, the Op gets another $5,000 certified check from Elihu Willsson to "clean up the city" and rid it of the gangs controlling it. The Op quickly identifies Donald's murderer as young bank teller Robert Albury, a murder that had nothing to do with gang activity or, as Elihu was certain of, Donald's wife. The murder mystery now sewn up, Elihu tries to get his money back and tells the Op to forget about taking down the gangs, but the Op insists he will follow through. While the Op had been investigating, the corrupt police chief Noonan had tried twice to have him gunned down, causing the Op to take a personal interest in the job.

In the meantime, the Op is spending time with Dinah Brand, a possible love interest of the late Donald Willsson and a moll for Max "Whisper" Thaler, a local gangster. The Op extracts information from Brand and Noonan, and increases tension in the city by leaking it to the warring parties. When the Op reveals that a bank robbery was staged by the cops and one of the gangs to discredit another gang, a gang war erupts.

The Op, disturbed by the slaughter he orchestrated, spends an evening of blackout inebriation with Brand, who finds it all amusing. He wakes the next morning to find her stabbed to death with the ice pick he had handled the previous evening. No signs of forced entry are visible, and he can't even be sure he did not do the stabbing himself during his delirium. The Op becomes a suspect sought by the police for Brand's murder, and one of his fellow operatives, Dick Foley, leaves Personville because he is uncertain of the Op's innocence.

The Op, now wanted by the police, entices Reno Starkey, a gang lieutenant, to take on the last strong rival gang led by Pete the Finn. The gangs are whittled down by pipe bombs, arson, gun fights, and corrupt cops gunning down the survivors.

The Op tracks down Starkey, the only gang leader still alive. Starkey is bleeding from four gunshot wounds, having just killed his rival Whisper Thaler. Starkey reveals that he was the one who stabbed Brand, but because she had collided with the semiconscious Op he had looked like the culprit. Starkey later succumbs to his wounds in the hospital.

The corrupt police chief Noonan and the gang leaders are all dead. The Op blackmails Elihu Willsson, having obtained four love letters Elihu had sent to Dinah Brand. The Op gets Elihu to call the governor, who sends in the National Guard, declares martial law, and suspends the entire police force. Elihu Willsson gets back his town, as promised, although not in the way that he had anticipated. The Op returns to San Francisco, where the Old Man (the chief of the Continental Detective Agency's office) criticizes him.

== Serial publication ==
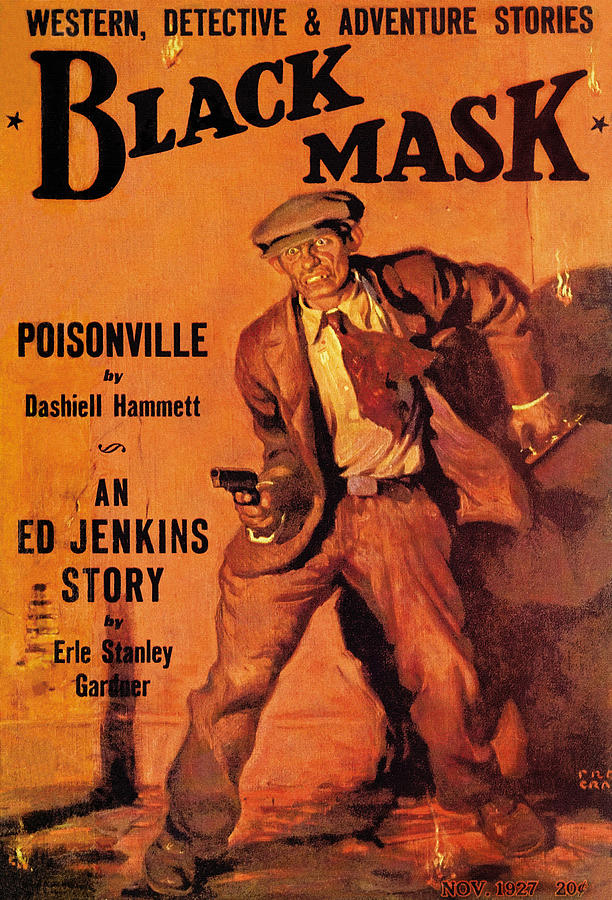
November 1927 issue of Black Mask, featuring "The Cleansing of Poisonville"

Red Harvest was originally serialized in four installments in the pulp magazine Black Mask:

- Part 1: "The Cleansing of Poisonville", Black Mask, November 1927
- Part 2: "Crime Wanted—Male or Female", Black Mask, December 1927
- Part 3: "Dynamite", Black Mask, January 1928
- Part 4: "The 19th Murder", Black Mask, February 1928

== Characters ==
- "The Continental Op", an operative from the San Francisco branch of the Continental Detective Agency
- Elihu Willsson, mining tycoon and "Czar of Poisonville"
- Donald Willsson, newspaper publisher and Elihu's son
- Mrs. Willsson, Donald's wife
- Lewis, Donald's assistant
- Noonan, the corrupt chief of police, whose brother Tim died two years before
- Max Thaler, alias "Whisper," a gambler and gangster
- Dinah Brand, Thaler's girlfriend, a tough woman with an uncanny allure to men
- Dan Rolff, Dinah's housemate and a "lunger"
- Lew Yard, gangster
- Reno Starkey, lieutenant in Yard's gang
- Pete the Finn, bootlegger
- Hank O'Mara, member of Starkey's gang
- Bill Quint, an organizer for the IWW
- Robert Albury, bank teller and murderer of Donald Willsson
- Helen Albury, Robert's younger sister
- Charles Procter Dawn, criminal lawyer
- Bob MacSwain, a former policeman, murderer of Tim Noonan
- Mickey Linehan, a detective from the Continental
- Dick Foley, a detective from the Continental
- The Old Man, boss of the San Francisco branch of the Continental

== Adaptations ==
Film critics David Desser and Manny Farber, among others, have noted similarities between Red Harvest and the 1961 film Yojimbo, directed by Akira Kurosawa. Other scholars, such as Donald Richie, believe the similarities are coincidental. Kurosawa said that a major source for Yojimbo was the film noir classic The Glass Key (1942), an adaptation of Hammett's 1931 novel of the same name. In Red Harvest, The Glass Key, and Yojimbo, corrupt officials and businessmen stand behind and profit from the rule of gangsters.

In the early 1970s, Italian director Bernardo Bertolucci considered filming an adaptation of Red Harvest and wrote a first draft infused with political themes typical of his work. A short while after, he wrote a second draft that was more faithful to Hammett's story. For the role of the Op he considered Robert Redford, Jack Nicholson (who had played a hard-boiled detective in Roman Polanski's neo-noir film Chinatown), and Clint Eastwood (who had played the Op-inspired "Man with No Name" in Sergio Leone's Dollars Trilogy). At some point, Bertolucci discussed this project with Warren Beatty in Rome. In 1982, Bertolucci moved to Los Angeles to begin production, but the project was shelved.

Donald E. Westlake wrote an unproduced screenplay adapting Red Harvest, which changed the story considerably to refocus the ending on the murder of Donald Willsson; Westlake felt that having the solution of the mystery come so early in the novel made the Op's continued involvement hard to justify.

Critics have noted elements of Red Harvest in the 1996 Walter Hill film Last Man Standing in which a man arrives in a corrupt town and manipulates a war between rival gangs.

As of 2024, Scott Frank and Megan Abbott are writing a script for Red Harvest for A24.

== In popular culture ==
=== Film ===
While Akira Kurosawa stated that a major source for the plot for Yojimbo was the 1942 classic The Glass Key, an adaptation of Hammett's 1931 novel The Glass Key, it has been noted by some critics that the overall plot of Yojimbo is closer to that of Hammett's Red Harvest. In David Carradine's autobiography, he recalls a conversation with Roger Corman in which Corman claims that Kurosawa himself told his friends that Yojimbo was a retelling of Red Harvest.

The Coen brothers' film Blood Simple (1984) takes its title from a line in Red Harvest in which the Op tells Brand the escalating violence has affected his mental state: "This damned burg's getting me. If I don't get away soon, I'll be going blood-simple like the natives." The Coens' film Miller's Crossing (1990) employs stylistic and narrative elements of Hammett's Red Harvest, The Glass Key, and several of Hammett's shorter works. Additionally, both protagonists speak the line "What's the rumpus?".

The dialogue and plot of director Rian Johnson's debut feature, Brick, was inspired by the novels of Dashiell Hammett, particularly Red Harvest.

=== Literature ===
Science-fiction writer David Drake has said that he took the plot of his novel The Sharp End (1993) from Red Harvest.

=== Television ===
In The Aurora Teagarden Mysteries Season 1 episode 10, "A Game of Cat and Mouse", Red Harvest is quoted, as is The Maltese Falcon.

In Bosch Season 5 episode 19, "Creep Signed His Kill", Crate and Barrel plan to see a double bill of Yojimbo and A Fistful of Dollars which they describe as Red Harvest adaptations".
