= The House in Turk Street =

"The House in Turk Street" is an early short story by Dashiell Hammett, featuring the Continental Op. It was first published in Black Mask in April 1924. This story indicates Hammett was turning towards themes of increasing violence in his stories, and its savagery has been commented upon, particularly the massacre which occurs at the end.

The story was loosely adapted into the film No Good Deed, directed by Bob Rafelson.

== Plot ==
On a routine canvass of Turk Street in San Francisco, the Continental Op is invited into the home of the Quarres, an elderly couple. The Op is given a cup of tea and a cigar, but his interview of the Quarres is suddenly interrupted by a man with a gun, who believes he is the target of the Op's search. The Op is bound and gagged, but overhears the aftermath of a plot to steal $100,000 in bonds, as the conspirators try to decide what to do with him.
