= No Good Deed (2002 film) =

- Theatrical release poster
- Directed by: Bob Rafelson
- Written by: Christopher Cannan; Steve Barancik
- Based on: "The House in Turk Street" by Dashiell Hammett
- Produced by: Barry M. Berg; David Braun
- Starring: Samuel L. Jackson; Milla Jovovich; Stellan Skarsgård
- Cinematography: Juan Ruiz Anchía
- Edited by: William S. Scharf
- Music by: Jeff Beal
- Distributed by: Mac Releasing
- Release dates: June 29, 2002 (Moscow Film Festival); September 12, 2003 (United States)
- Running time: 97 minutes
- Countries: Germany; United States
- Language: English
- Budget: $12 million
- Box office: $1.4 million

No Good Deed is a 2002 American crime thriller film directed by Bob Rafelson, his last feature film. It stars Samuel L. Jackson, Milla Jovovich, Stellan Skarsgård and Doug Hutchison. The screenplay by Christopher Cannan and Steve Barancik is based on the short story "The House in Turk Street" by Dashiell Hammett. The original music score is by Jeff Beal.

It was entered into the 24th Moscow International Film Festival.

== Plot ==
Jack Friar is a police detective who, while doing a friend a favor and searching for a runaway teenager on Turk Street, stumbles upon a bizarre band of criminals about to pull off a bank robbery. Jack finds himself being held hostage while the criminals decide what to do with him, and the leader's beautiful girlfriend Erin is left alone to watch Jack.

Erin, who is a master manipulator of the men in the gang, reveals another side to Jack – a melancholy romantic who could have been a classical cellist. She finds Jack's captivity an irresistible turn-on and he cannot figure out if she is being honest or if she is manipulating him as well. Before the gang returns, Jack and Erin's connection intensifies, leaving the fate of the money in question.

== Cast ==
- Samuel L. Jackson as Jack Friar
- Milla Jovovich as Erin
- Stellan Skarsgård as Tyrone Abernathy
- Doug Hutchison as Hoop
- Joss Ackland as Mr. Thomas Quarre
- Grace Zabriskie as Mrs. Karen Quarre
- Francis X. McCarthy as Bank Manager
- Jonathan Higgins as David Brewster
- Shannon Lawson as Amy
- Robert Welch as Willy

== Reception ==
On the review aggregator website Rotten Tomatoes, 25% of 12 critics' reviews are positive, with an average rating of 4.2/10.

== Awards ==
Bob Rafelson was nominated for a prize at the Moscow International Film Festival in 2002.

== See also ==
- List of films featuring diabetes
