= The Glass Key =

1931 novel by Dashiell Hammett

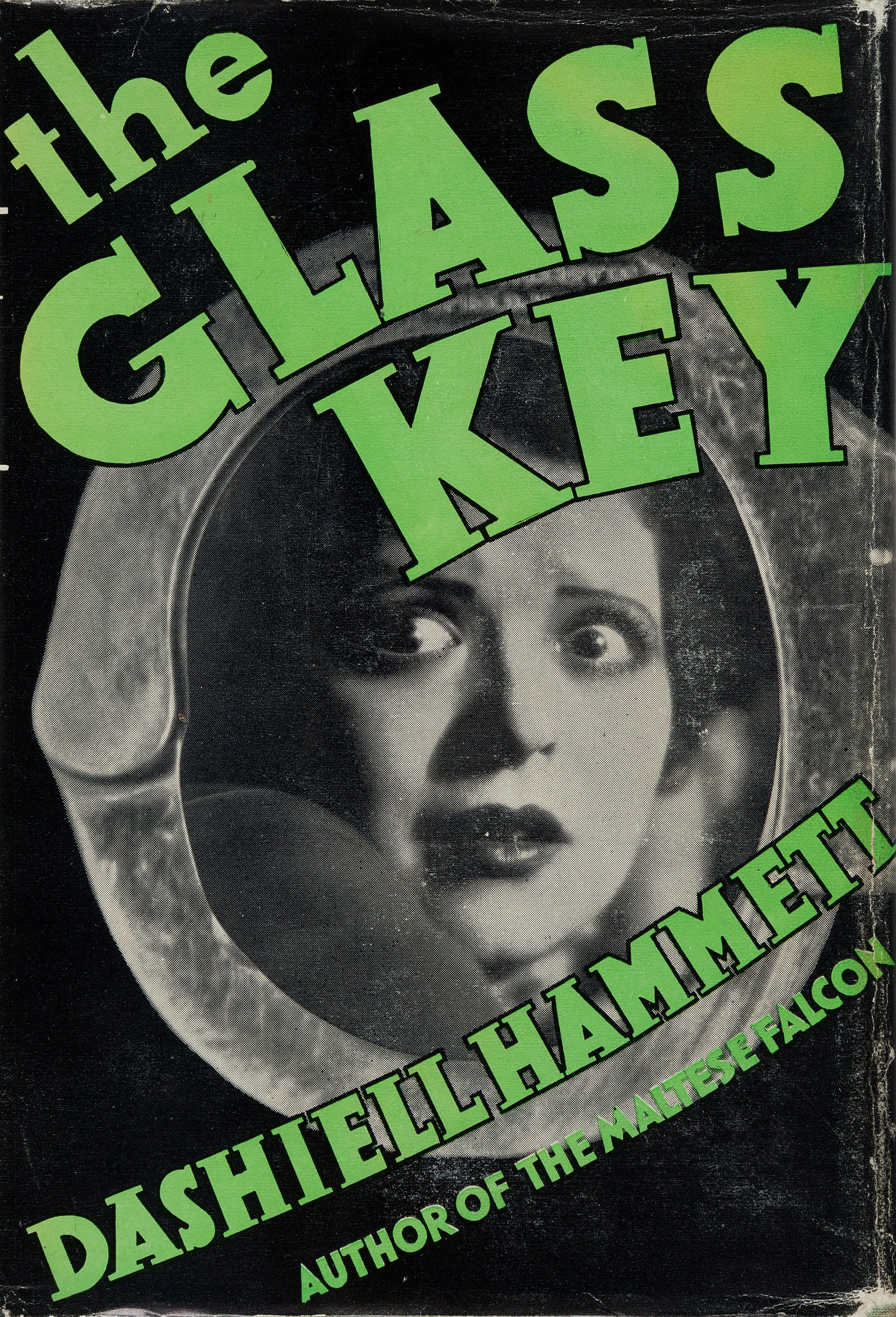
- Cover of the first edition
- Author: Dashiell Hammett
- Language: English
- Genre: Crime
- Published: 1931 (Alfred A. Knopf)
- Publication place: United States
- Media type: Print (hardcover)
- Pages: 214
- Preceded by: The Maltese Falcon
- Followed by: The Thin Man

The Glass Key is a novel by American writer Dashiell Hammett. First published as a serial in Black Mask magazine in 1930, it then was collected in 1931 (in London; the American edition followed 3 months later). It tells the story of a gambler and racketeer, Ned Beaumont, whose devotion to Paul Madvig, a crooked political boss, leads him to investigate the murder of a local senator's son as a potential gang war brews. Hammett dedicated the novel to his onetime lover Nell Martin.

There have been two US film adaptations (1935 and 1942) of the novel. A radio adaptation starring Orson Welles aired on March 10, 1939, as part of his Campbell Playhouse series. The book was also a major influence on the Coen brothers' 1990 film Miller's Crossing, which features a similar scenario.

In 1985, the feature film Bande, based on Dashiell Hammett’s novel The Glass Key, was made in Estonia. The film was directed by Arvo Kruusement and produced by Tallinnfilm.

The Glass Key Award (in Swedish, Glasnyckeln), named after the novel, has been presented annually since 1992 for the best crime novel by a Scandinavian writer.

== Plot summary ==
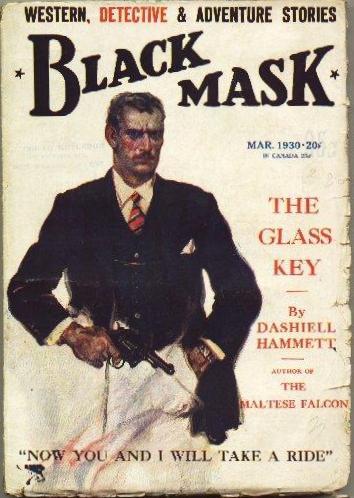
March 1930 issue of Black Mask magazine, featuring Hammett's The Glass Key

The story revolves around Ned Beaumont. Beaumont is best friend, confidant, and political advisor to the criminal political boss Paul Madvig. Ned finds the body of a senator's son on the street, and Madvig asks him to thwart the D.A.'s investigation, his motive being that he wants to back the corrupt senator in order to marry his daughter, Janet. Ned goes to New York searching for Bernie, a bookie who owes him a great deal of money from a gambling debt, but ends up getting beaten up.

Someone sends a series of letters to people close to the crime, hinting that Madvig was the murderer. Suspicion for this falls on Madvig's daughter Opal, the victim's girlfriend. Madvig's political base begins to crumble when he refuses to spring a follower's brother from jail. The follower goes to rival mob boss Shad O'Rory, who eliminates a witness to the brother's crime. Madvig then declares war on O'Rory, who offers to bribe Beaumont to expose Madvig in the newspaper. Beaumont refuses, is knocked unconscious and wakes captive in a dingy room where he is beaten daily.

Hospitalized after his escape, Beaumont tells Madvig and Janet that he was laying a trap for O'Rory; he then struggles out of bed to stop the newspaper from printing its exposé. Beaumont confronts O'Rory, the publisher, and Madvig's daughter Opal. The publisher commits suicide after Beaumont seduces his wife.

Next Beaumont interviews Janet, discovering that she wrote the letters and that the Senator knew about the murder before Beaumont found the body. A new clue points to Madvig and when confronted he confesses but he cannot account for the victim's hat, a detail Beaumont pointedly repeats throughout the novel.

This impasse and Beaumont's growing interest in Janet, Madvig's love interest, cause a second rift between the men. Beaumont and Janet pair up to solve the murder. Beaumont uncovers evidence proving the senator killed his own son and turns him over to the police. Beaumont confronts Madvig with his new discovery, and the two depart, not enemies but no longer friends.

== Characters ==
- Ned Beaumont — gambler and amateur detective who finds Taylor Henry's body
- Paul Madvig — crooked political boss, who backs Senator Henry because he is in love with Janet; best friend of Ned Beaumont
- Sen. Ralph Bancroft Henry — up for reelection; father of Taylor and Janet and the murderer of Taylor
- Janet Henry — daughter of Senator Henry; hates Madvig and falls in love with Ned
- Shad O'Rory — Madvig's rival, a gangster, who has Ned brutally beaten for refusing to help frame Paul; killed by Jeff
- Bernie Despain — gambler who owes Ned money and whom Ned suspects of having murdered Taylor Henry
- Jack Rumsen — private detective hired by Ned to trail Bernie
- Michael Farr — District Attorney, in the pocket of Paul Madvig
- Jeff Gardner — O'Rory's bodyguard, who beats Ned and later strangles O'Rory

== Themes ==
As noted by the literary critic James F. Maxfield, "Hammett employs an objective approach, merely reporting the conversations and describing the surface actions of his characters, never directly presenting their thoughts and feelings". This leaves some ambiguity in the reasoning of Ned Beaumont's actions, such as his suspicions about Janet Henry's father. This makes it hard to determine the nature of Ned's relationship with Janet. While there is disagreement about whether or not they are together at the end, the fact that there is a relationship at all is indicative of "a different kind of hero".

=== Beaumont compared to other Hammett heroes ===
Ned Beaumont does not fit the popular, famous archetype of Jung, nor the weaker, less altruistic "hero" type of Hammett's other works, but is altogether different from either.

Hammett's detectives usually avoid relationships, but Ned is different. He does not possess the sort of "immunity" to emotional ties that the author's previous detectives had maintained, such as the Continental Op in Hammett's Red Harvest. Because of this supposed relationship between Ned and Janet, The Glass Key takes on a more traditional story line, that of the detective "hero" and his beautiful heroine, ending with a ride into the sunset of New York.

According to Maxfield, "Neither the Op nor [Hammett's detective character] Sam Spade would have gone off with Janet, for as detectives they both strove to be ruled as much as possible by reason. But Beaumont is a gambler instead of a detective, a man used to taking risks. Just as he continues to bet while he is on a losing streak, he is willing to make another kind of wager on Janet, despite the great odds of the relationship ending badly. Because he is willing to accept the risks that human commitments entail, Beaumont is, if not Hammett's ideal hero, his most completely human hero".

=== The Great Depression, small-town morality, and "luck" ===
A more obvious theme in The Glass Key shows itself through the characters and their respective moralities. The novel is set in an unnamed city, a more unassuming place—a smaller, less sophisticated location—than his previous novels. It is thus a locale more obviously open to corruption. Here are elected officials, community figures, and the like who participate in conspiracies of a type more often considered endemic to the underworld. Because of this, the characters openly display more animalistic qualities than in Hammett's previous novels.

The characters, perhaps through the objectivity of the writing style, are portrayed as cutthroat and almost feral. One reason for their apparent slippage into violence is most likely related to the early onset of the Great Depression, as the novel was published in 1931. The loss of "luck," as described in the novel ("What good am I if my luck’s gone?" He asks. "You might as well take your punishment and get it over with") is another deciding factor in the actions of the characters. The novel is similar in that respect to later Depression-era novels, such as The Postman Always Rings Twice.

== Writing style ==
Hammett's distinctive and groundbreaking style helped usher in the hardboiled genre. The Glass Key, written in Hammett's later noir years, is a prime example of his stylistic power. Raymond Chandler, a 20th-century author and critic, discussed Hammett's sense of the modern world in The Glass Key:

The realist in murder writes of a world in which gangsters can rule nations and almost rule cities, ... where no man can walk down a dark street in safety because law and order are things we talk about but refrain from practicing; ... It is not a fragrant world, but it is the world you live in, and certain writers with tough minds and a cool spirit of detachment can make very interesting and even amusing patterns out of it?

William Kennedy, also a 20th-century author and book critic, explained what is so complex about Hammett's writing style: "Hammett's strategy is to show the process of detection as motivated by and affecting a friendship between two men. Out of these materials Hammett creates a dynamic structure of uncertain, constantly shifting human relationships."

In The Glass Key, Hammett refuses to let the reader into the characters' minds. Perhaps Hammett felt all fiction should lack an inner monologue; in the real world people only understand actions and speech and that is all Hammett's characters give us. By keeping the readers in the dark of his characters true intentions, one analysis argues he intensifies the reader's sense of the ambiguous nature of reality. That is to say, we never can trust if a character is doing what he is doing out of loyalty, or for selfish intentions.

== Reception ==
There is general agreement that The Maltese Falcon and The Glass Key are Hammett's two finest books. With the passing years Hammett looked more and more harshly on his own fiction but conceded that The Glass Key was "not so bad". Its reception was even better than that of the previous novel, and so were sales, 20,000 copies having been sold eighteen months after publication. Some preferred the Falcon, others said simply that Hammett had written the three best detective stories of all time, and in the New Yorker Dorothy Parker screamed that "there is entirely too little screaming about the work of Dashiell Hammett".

Hammett felt that the finished book was his best work, nonetheless because "the clues were nicely placed... although nobody seemed to notice". Reviewers were less sanguine. David T. Bazelon, writing for Commentary, thought that Hammett had attempted a conventional novel, in which characters act for reasons of loyalty, passion or power. Even on those generous grounds, he found the novel unsatisfactory: "We never know whether [the] motive in solving the murder is loyalty, job-doing or love... this ambiguity reflects, I think, Hammett's difficulty in writing an unformularized novel-- one in which an analysis of motives is fundamental". Other critics wrote that the novel was "Hammett’s least satisfactory" and that the hero was "mechanical and his emotions were not there". Robert Edenbaum, for basically the same reasons, called The Glass Key Hammett's "least satisfactory novel... [in Hemingway] the mask is lifted every time the character is alone; he admits his misery to himself...exposes his inner life. The Hammett mask is never lifted; the Hammett character never lets you inside. Instead of the potential despair of Hemingway, Hammett gives you unimpaired control and machinelike efficiency".

Louis Untermeyer wrote, "Hammett has done something extraordinarily new to the murder and mystery story. He has made the reader as much interested in the relation of his individuals to each other as in the solution of the story". Somerset Maugham saw in Ned Beaumont "a curious, intriguing character whom any novelist would have been proud to conceive" And Raymond Chandler found "an effect of movement, intrigue, cross-purposes, and the gradual elucidation of character, which is all the detective story has any right to be about anyway. All the rest is spillikins in the parlor".

== Legacy ==
Dashiell Hammett and The Glass Key have influenced many other hardboiled writers. Raymond Chandler wrote in his oft-cited essay "The Simple Art of Murder" that Hammett and other hardboiled writers created a style that removed the puzzle-game intrigues of typical detective novels and instead replaced it with realism: "Where murder is committed for reasons, and people talk and act as real people do". Chandler argued that it is due to these authors that this style was developed and raised from a generic form to a "new level of artistic substance".

Together with Hammett's 1929 novel Red Harvest, The Glass Key provided inspiration for the Coen brothers' 1990 film Miller's Crossing.

The 1942 film adaptation appears briefly in the season 2 finale of the show Bosch during a conversation between Bosch and the detective on his mother's murder case.

Hammett by Joe Gores, in which a fictionalised Hammett investigates the murder of an old friend, ends with the writer beginning to plot out the book that will eventually become The Glass Key.

The book is a major reference point in the 2017 film, Mercury in Retrograde, whose characters discuss it at length in a climactic book-club scene.

== Adaptations ==
=== Film ===
The novel was adapted for the 1935 film The Glass Key, directed by Frank Tuttle and produced by E. Lloyd Sheldon, with a screenplay by Kathryn Scola and Kubec Glasmon. It was distributed by Paramount Pictures. The lead characters were portrayed by George Raft as Ed [not Ned] Beaumont, Edward Arnold as Paul Madvig, and Claire Dodd as Janet Henry.

Another film, also entitled The Glass Key, was released in 1942, directed by Stuart Heisler and produced by Buddy G. DeSylva, with a screenplay by Jonathan Latimer. It was also distributed by Paramount Pictures. The film starred Alan Ladd as Ed [not Ned] Beaumont, Brian Donlevy as Paul Madvig, and Veronica Lake as Janet Henry. The Irish mobster Shad O'Rory, who played a major role in both the novel and the first film adaptation (in which he was portrayed by Robert Gleckler), was replaced in the second film by a Mediterranean mobster, Nick Varna, portrayed by the Maltese actor Joseph Calleia.

Though not a direct adaptation, the Coen brothers' 1990 film Miller's Crossing features a similar premise and characters.

=== Radio ===
The Glass Key was adapted by Howard E. Koch for the March 10, 1939, episode of Orson Welles's CBS Radio series The Campbell Playhouse. The cast included Welles (Paul Madvig), Paul Stewart (Ned Beaumont), Ray Collins (Shad O'Rory), Myron McCormick (Senator Henry), Effie Palmer (Mrs. Madvig), Elspeth Eric (Opal Madvig), Elizabeth Morgan (telephone operator), Everett Sloane (Farr), Howard Smith (Jeff), Laura Baxter (Janet Henry) and Edgar Barrier (Rusty).

On July 7, 1946, Hour of Mystery (Summer 1946 series replacing Theatre Guild's The Theatre Guild on the Air) presented an adaptation, by Robert Cenedella, on American Broadcasting Company. Kenneth Webb was the director, and Edwin Marshall was the producer.

On July 22, 1946, The Lady Esther Screen Guild Theatre presented yet another adaptation, by Harry Cronman starring Alan Ladd, Marjorie Reynolds, Ward Bond. Bill Lawrence was both the director and producer.

On November 26, 1946, The Cresta Blanca Hollywood Players presented The Glass Key. Gene Kelly played Ned Beaumont in the adaptation.

On April 13, 1948, Studio One, the radio series presented yet another adaptation, starring Alan Baxter, Robert Dryden, Joe De Santis, Elissa Landi, Everett Sloane

=== Television ===
The Glass Key was adapted as part of the Westinghouse Studio One television series by screenwriter Worthington Miner and director George Zachary. TV version starred Donald Briggs, Lawrence Fletcher and Jean Carson and was originally broadcast May 11, 1949.
