= The Gutting of Couffignal =

Book by Dashiell Hammett

- Short story by Dashiell Hammett
- Country: United States
- Language: English
- Genres: Detective, Short Story

Publication
- Publisher: Black Mask
- Media type: Print
- Publication date: 1925
- Pages: 30 pp

Chronology
- Series: The Continental Op
Dead Yellow Women	The Creeping Siamese

"The Gutting of Couffignal" (1925) is a hardboiled crime short story by Dashiell Hammett. It has been reprinted many times in different collections, namely: The Return of the Continental Op, The Big Knockover, Crime Stories and Other Writings, and The Big Book of the Continental Op.

== Plot ==
The Continental Op has been hired to guard presents given at a wedding, on a small and exceedingly exclusive island called Couffignal, for which a resident requires an income in the millions. Late at night, as a storm was raging, the lights went out across the island, followed by the sounds of gunfire. The hired detective is asked to go investigate. He discovers an armed car has come across the bridge, which has been blown up to prevent any outside forces impeding the robbers' escape or the rescue of the denizens, and a machine gun is firing on anyone in sight. The rest of the gang members rob the houses, stealing millions. The only way off the island is by boat, but when the Op tries to explore the bay, he is shot at by another machine gun. Throughout it all, an escaped political refugee, Princess Zhukovski, accompanies the detective as he chases the elusive robbers in the rain. He attempts to recruit the citizens of the island to help him, but observes that "You can't fight machine guns and hand grenades with peaceful villagers and retired capitalists."

Finally, he realizes he has crossed paths with the same people over and over, and the heist begins to look suspiciously like a military operation. Upon this discovery, the Op deduces that someone was using the noisy and sporadic shooting to create the illusion of a large-scale coordinated robbery, when instead, it was actually a small job conducted by only a handful of men. Chasing one of the perpetrators, the Op twists his ankle, which makes it hard to move on. He spots a crippled young man, forces him into a chair, gives him $5 as collateral, and takes his crutch to help himself walk. Upon returning to the safety of the princess's home and being tended to, the Op finally understands that Princess Zhukovski and General Pleshkev are the masterminds behind the operation. As White (Czarist) Russians, they once lived in luxury but had to flee Communism to America, where they existed as pauper servants to the rich.

Princess Zhukovski laughs when he pulls his gun on her. He is unable to chase her as she coolly strolls towards the door, confessing all. He threatens to shoot her, but she shrugs it off as a bluff. And consequently, the story ends as such:

"Stop, you idiot!" I bawled at her. Her face laughed over her shoulder at me. She walked without haste to the door, her short skirt of gray flannel shaping itself to the calf of each gray wool-stockinged leg as its mate stepped forward. Sweat greased the gun in my hand. When her right foot was on the doorsill, a little chuckling sound came from her throat.
"Adieu!" she said softly.
And I put a bullet in the calf of her leg. She sat down--plump! Utter surprise stretched her white face. It was too soon for pain. I had never shot a woman before. I felt queer about it.
"You ought to have known I'd do it!" My voice sounded harsh and savage and like a stranger's in my ears. "Didn't I steal a crutch from a cripple?"
