= Steve Barancik =

American screenwriter

- Born: September 23, 1961 (age 63); Chicago, Illinois, United States
- Occupation: Screenwriter

Steve Barancik (born September 23, 1961, in Chicago, Illinois) is a screenwriter whose first screenplay, Buffalo Girls, was filmed and released as The Last Seduction in 1994. The film premiered as an HBO movie before going on shortly after to art house success. Actress Linda Fiorentino received notoriety for playing the movie's femme fatale, Bridget Gregory/Wendy Kroy, and Barancik was nominated for an Edgar Allan Poe Award for best mystery/crime screenplay of 1994.

Barancik received critical acclaim for his screenplay for The Last Seduction. James Berardinelli called his dialogue "scintillating, often hilarious, and occasionally insightful", while Variety said his development of the narrative "is very skillful and original". The Washington Post claimed it was "a viciously funny first screenplay" from Barancik, and Kim Newman of Empire called his screenplay "superb". Barancik worked steadily in the industry but with little to show for it until receiving shared screenplay credit for 2002's No Good Deed. He also received shared story credit for 2005's Domino. Barancik is also the founder and a regular performer in Monolog Cabin, a group featuring writers performing comedic personal essays, which performs at Club Congress in Tucson, Arizona. He has developed a website devoted to the subject of quality children's books and another to collecting the experiences of authors who have self-published.
