= The Continental Op =

Fictional character created by Dashiell Hammett

- First Dell mapback edition
- First appearance: "Arson Plus"; Black Mask; October 1923
- Last appearance: "Death and Company"; Black Mask; November 1930
- Created by: Dashiell Hammett
- Portrayed by: James Coburn; Peter Boyle; Christopher Lloyd

In-universe information
- Gender: Male
- Occupation: Private investigator

The Continental Op is a fictional character created by Dashiell Hammett (1894–1961). He is a private investigator employed as an operative of the Continental Detective Agency's San Francisco office in the 1920s. The 28 stories, and two novels, are all told in the first person and his name is never given.

== Profile ==
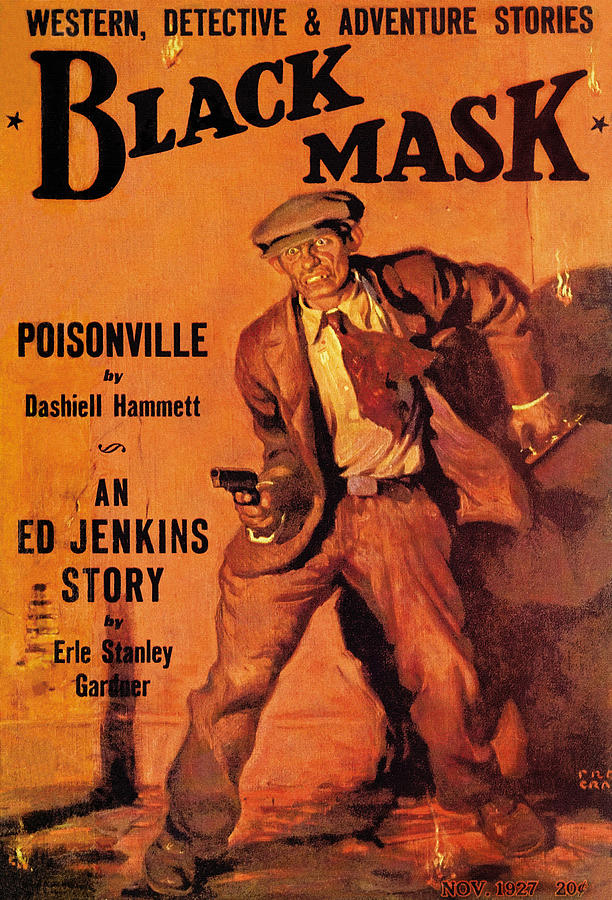
November 1927 issue of Black Mask, featuring "The Cleansing of Poisonville"

The Continental Op is a master of deceit in the exercise of his occupation. In his 1927 Black Mask story "$106,000 Blood Money" the Op is confronted with a dilemma: should he expose a corrupt fellow detective, thereby hurting the reputation of his agency; and should he also allow an informant to collect the $106,000 reward in a big case even though he is morally certain—but cannot prove—that the informant has murdered one of his agency's clients? The Op resolves his two problems neatly by manipulating events so that the corrupt detective and the informant get into an armed confrontation in which both are killed.

Decades of witnessing human cruelty, misery, and ruin, as well as being instrumental in sending hundreds of people to jail or the gallows, have greatly weakened the Op's natural sympathy with his fellow men. He fears becoming like his boss, "The Old Man", whom he describes as "a shell, without any human feelings whatsoever".

Little backstory is supplied; in Red Harvest he quips "I was raised in a water-front saloon," but it is not clear if he is being serious. As for physical description, "Little fat detective whose name I don't know... a wooden block of a man," is how his femme fatale adversary describes him in The Girl with Silver Eyes. In the penultimate chapter of The Dain Curse, a female client, whose life the Op has saved three times, while also curing her of morphine addiction, says to him:

"You came in just now, and then I saw—"
She stopped.
"What?"
"A monster. A nice one, an especially nice one to have around when you're in trouble, but a monster just the same, without any human foolishness like love in him, and—What's the matter? Have I said something I shouldn't?"

The Op is one of the first major hardboiled detectives later developed in such characters as Hammett's own Sam Spade, Raymond Chandler's Philip Marlowe, Mickey Spillane's Mike Hammer, Ross Macdonald's Lew Archer and others.

== Publication history ==
As many of Hammett's short stories were later published in collected volumes, the publishing history of these works is sometimes confused. The Continental Op made his debut in the October 1923 issue of Black Mask, making him one of the earliest hard-boiled private detective characters to appear in the pulp magazines of the early twentieth century. He appeared in 36 short stories, all but two of which appeared in Black Mask.

With the intent of transitioning from short stories to novels, Hammett began writing linked stories in 1924, "The House in Turk Street" and "The Girl with the Silver Eyes". Two other related stories, "The Big Knockover" and "$106,000 Blood Money" appeared in Black Mask in 1927. The transition culminated in 1927, with the linked stories which formed the basis for his first two novels, Red Harvest and The Dain Curse, both novels released in 1929. The texts in the novels differ from the pulp magazine versions as they were revised by an editor at Alfred A. Knopf.

Starting in the Second World War, many of the short stories were reprinted as serials in American newspapers, sometimes under different titles. Ten collections of Hammett short works, including most of the Continental Op stories, were published by Mercury Publications under an imprint, either "Bestsellers Mystery", "A Jonathan Press Mystery" or "Mercury Mystery". The majority of these collections printed as paperbacks contained introductory essays by Ellery Queen. Frederic Dannay, half of the duo using the pseudonym Ellery Queen, compiled and edited the Hammett's stories such that these versions are not complete. Of the ten, the following contain Continental Op stories: $106,000 Blood Money (later republished as The Big Knock-Over), The Continental Op, The Return of the Continental Op, Hammett Homicides, Dead Yellow Women, Nightmare Town, Creeping Siamese, and Women in the Dark. When the paperback collections proved popular, World Publishing under their "Tower Books" imprint, published them in hardcover. Many of these edited versions were later republished as Dell mapbacks.

In the late 1960s, Hammett's writing was rediscovered and republished with somewhat confusing titles. Of the 28 stories not a part of Red Harvest or The Dain Curse, 26 have been made available in one of three collections, The Big Knockover, The Continental Op, and Nightmare Town. These new anthologies do not include the same stories as the similarly titled Mercury Publications. Up until the 21st century these three volumes were the easiest way to access most of the stories. However, all of these collections used the abridged versions Dannay created for his compilations.

The Library of America's Complete Novels includes both Red Harvest and The Dain Curse as printed by Knopf. The companion collection Crime Stories and Other Writings does not include the original pulp magazine texts. For the first two printings of this collection, as is said in the Notes on the Texts: "No copy is known to be extant of the issue of the pulp magazine Mystery Stories in which 'This King Business' initially appeared, in January 1928." When a copy was located a third printing was issued with the integral text.

In 2017, Vintage Crime published a complete collection of all 36 Continental Op stories also based on the pulp magazine texts and an, until then, unpublished story fragment entitled "Three Dimes."

== List of stories ==
Using the texts that were first published in the pulp magazines, The Big Book of the Continental Op includes all 37 entries of the list; the 28 short stories, the unfinished story and the eight parts of the two serialized novels, The Cleansing of Poisonville (Red Harvest) and The Dain Curse as they first appeared in the pulp magazines.

#	Title	Alternate Title	Magazine	Date	Collections	Summary
1	"Arson Plus"		Black Mask	October 1, 1923		(as Peter Collinson) Suspecting insurance fraud, the Op investigates the burning of an isolated farmhouse and its reclusive inhabitant.
2	"Crooked Souls"	"The Gatewood Caper"	Black Mask	October 15, 1923		A bullying lumber baron has lost a daughter to kidnappers, but the Op isn't convinced—of anything.
3	"Slippery Fingers"		Black Mask	October 15, 1923		(as Peter Collinson) The Op and the police search for the owner of the fingerprints strewn over the scene of a gory murder.
4	"It"	"The Black Hat That Wasn't There"	Black Mask	November 1, 1923		A reckless businessman plots theft and elopement, then disappears, until the Op locates him in a pitch-dark basement.
5	"Bodies Piled Up"	"The House Dick"	Black Mask	December 1, 1923		Posing as a killer hunting a killer works too well as the Op gets caught in a crossfire.
6	"The Tenth Clew"	"The Tenth Clue"	Black Mask	January 1, 1924		A rich man is killed with a typewriter and the Op gets dumped into San Francisco Bay.
7	"Night Shots"		Black Mask	February 1924		In a lonely country house, the Op investigates pot-shots aimed at a sick old scoundrel.
8	"Zigzags of Treachery"		Black Mask	March 1, 1924		When a prominent surgeon commits suicide and an unknown wife shows up, the Op and other agents follow suspect after suspect to untangle a decades-old conspiracy.
9	"One Hour"		Black Mask	April 1924		In a busy hour, a hit-and-run leads the Op to a print shop where he's mobbed.
10	"The House in Turk Street"		Black Mask	April 15, 1924		Routine questions on a quiet street tumble the Op into a den of thieves.
11	"The Girl with Silver Eyes"		Black Mask	June 1924		Following on "Turk Street", a dead poet leads the Op to a dark night's shootout outside a rough-and-tumble roadhouse.
12	"Women, Politics and Murder"	"Death on Pine Street"	Black Mask	September 1924		The Op shuttles between a hysterical wife and a dead-pan mistress, knowing both are liars, to learn who killed a city contractor.
13	"The Golden Horseshoe"		Black Mask	November 1924		The Op finds a hophead husband who ran away to Tijuana, but the wife he left behind turns up dead.
14	"Who Killed Bob Teal?"		True Detective Mysteries	November 1924		A fellow Continental detective was killed while shadowing a suspect, so the Op and a city cop retrace his steps. The basic elements of the detective's murder are reused in The Maltese Falcon.
15	"Mike, Alec or Rufus?"	"Tom, Dick or Harry"	Black Mask	January 1925		The cops are stumped by a robber who ran into an apartment house and didn't come out, but not the Op.
16	"The Whosis Kid"		Black Mask	March 1925		On a hunch, the Op trails a stick-up artist and worms his way into a "double-, triple- and septuple-cross".
17	"The Scorched Face"		Black Mask	May 1925		Hunting two missing daughters, the Op uncovers a rash of debutante suicides and disappearances.
18	"Corkscrew"		Black Mask	September 1925		The Op is appointed Deputy Sheriff of Corkscrew, Arizona, where cowboys keep getting killed.
19	"Dead Yellow Women"		Black Mask	November 1925		The Op braves the dark alleys of Chinatown to learn why a seaside mansion was raided by Asian strangers.
20	"The Gutting of Couffignal"		Black Mask	December 1925		On a wealthy summer island, the Continental Op tries to thwart an invasion when the lights go off and machine guns fire up.
21	"Creeping Siamese"		Black Mask	March 1926		A man dies in the Continental office without revealing who knifed him. The Op connects the crime with the victim's decade-old adventures in Asia.
22	"The Big Knock-Over"		Black Mask	February 1927		An army of imported gangsters raided two banks, and the Op dodges bullets and fists to find the mastermind.
23	"$106,000 Blood Money"		Black Mask	May 1927		In the aftermath of "The Big Knockover", the Op hunts the double-crossing mastermind, as do "half the crooks in the country".
24	"The Main Death"		Black Mask	June 1927		The Op ignores a suicide to get back $20,000 - at gun point.
25	"The Cleansing of Poisonville"	Red Harvest	Black Mask	November 1927		Summoned to "Poisonville", the Op finds his client was murdered. The dead man's father rules the town, so the Op strikes a deal to clean up the town "with a free hand". Dodging double-crossing cops and crooks, he exposes the murderer. And refuses to call off the "cleansing".
26	"Crime Wanted - Male or Female"	Red Harvest	Black Mask	December 1927		Stirring up trouble, the Op un-fixes a fight and investigates a year-old "suicide" of the police chief's brother, just as someone dynamites the City Hall holding cells. "Poisonville was beginning to boil out under the lid."
27	"Dynamite"	Red Harvest	Black Mask	January 1928		A raid on a bootlegger's roadhouse makes the cops miss a bank robbery. As the mob ruling "Poisonville" gathers for a "peace conference", the Op tosses "dynamite" that exposes multiple frame-ups and shatters the partnership.
28	"The 19th Murder"	Red Harvest	Black Mask	February 1928		Getting "blood simple as the natives", the Op wakes to find he may have ice-picked his female informer, so runs from the law while steering the mobs into a final battle for control of "Poisonville".
29	"This King Business"		Mystery Stories	January 1928		Seeking a wayward son in the Balkan country of Muravia, the Op learns the boy is funding a kingly coup.
30	"Black Lives"	The Dain Curse	Black Mask	November 1928		
31	"The Hollow Temple"	The Dain Curse	Black Mask	December 1928		
32	"Black Honeymoon"	The Dain Curse	Black Mask	January 1929		
33	"Black Riddle"	The Dain Curse	Black Mask	February 1929		
34	"Fly Paper"		Black Mask	August 1929		The Op finds a "wandering daughter" who liked rough "yeggs" and ended up dead.
35	"The Farewell Murder"		Black Mask	February 1930		The Op struggles to prove a vendetta-bent sadist wasn't nine hours away at the time of a grisly killing.
36	"Death and Company"		Black Mask	November 1930		Kidnappers collect ransom money from under the noses of the police, then kill their hostage. Death catches the culprit before the Op can.
37	"Three Dimes"			2017		Unpublished - posthumously published in The Big Book of the Continental Op Unfinished story that exist only as a partial draft and a set of notes.

== Dramatic adaptations ==
- In 1939, The Farewell Murder was adapted as Another Thin Man, the third entry in the Thin Man film series. The story was modified to star Hammett's Nick and Nora Charles in place of the Continental Op.
- In 1978, The Dain Curse was made into a six-hour CBS television miniseries starring James Coburn. For the miniseries, the Op was named Hamilton Nash (his creator's name 'spelled sideways').
- In 1982, Peter Boyle played the Continental Op in the opening of Hammett, while Hammett (Frederic Forrest) writes a story about the detective character. Boyle later appears as Jimmy Ryan, Hammett's former co-worker and mentor from his Pinkerton days, who expresses a conviction that the Op is based on him and criticizes Hammett for not giving the character a name.
- In 1995, Christopher Lloyd played The Continental Op in "Fly Paper", in season 2 episode 7 of the TV anthology series Fallen Angels adapted from Hammett's short story, co-starring Darren McGavin as The Old Man.

== See also ==
- Detective fiction
