= The Dain Curse =

1929 novel by Dashiell Hammett

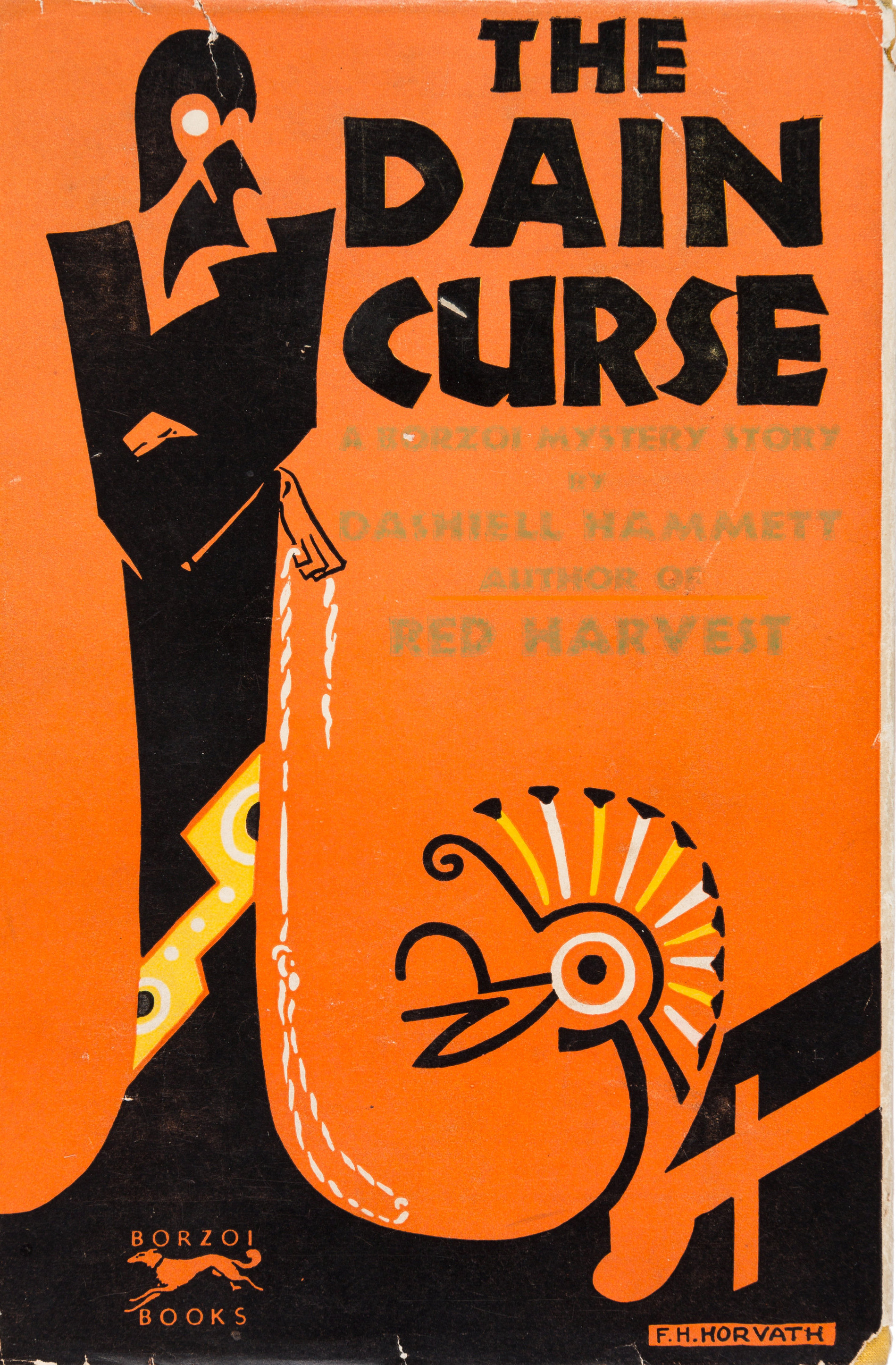
- Cover of the first edition
- Author: Dashiell Hammett
- Language: English
- Genre: Mystery, crime
- Published: 1929 (Alfred A. Knopf)
- Publication place: United States
- Media type: Print (hardcover)
- Preceded by: Red Harvest
- Followed by: The Maltese Falcon
- Text: The Dain Curse online

The Dain Curse is a novel by American writer Dashiell Hammett, published in 1929. Before its publication in book form, it was serialized in Black Mask magazine in 1928 and '29.

== Serial publication ==
The Dain Curse was originally serialized in four installments in the pulp magazine Black Mask:

- Part 1: "Black Lives" (Black Mask, November 1928)
- Part 2: "The Hollow Temple" (Black Mask, December 1928)
- Part 3: "Black Honeymoon" (Black Mask, January 1929)
- Part 4: "Black Riddle" (Black Mask, February 1929)

The novel of the same title based on the Black Mask serial is composed of three parts, each concerning different mysteries—Part One, "The Dains"; Part Two, "The Temple"; and Part Three, "Quesada".

== Plot summary ==
The story is told in the first person, and the nameless detective known only as The Continental Op investigates a theft of diamonds from the Leggett family of San Francisco. The plot involves a supposed curse on the Dain family, said to inflict sudden and violent deaths upon those in their vicinity. Edgar Leggett's wife is a Dain, as is his daughter Gabrielle. The detective untangles a web of robberies, lies and murder. It is discovered that Gabrielle Leggett is under the influence of a mysterious religious cult and is also addicted to morphine.

Gabrielle escapes from the cult and marries her fiancé Eric Collinson, but bloodshed continues to follow her. The Continental Op, on behalf of four successive clients, investigates the reason behind all the mysterious, violent events surrounding Gabrielle Leggett, which he eventually uncovers. The concluding chapters of the novel contain a detailed description of how the Op weans her from her drug habit, and the novel ends on a hopeful note.

== Characters in The Dain Curse ==
- The Continental Op – private detective
- Madison Andrews – Leggett's attorney
- Claude Baker – witnessed Gabrielle driving away in Quesada
- Mrs. Begg – the Leggetts' former servant
- Eric Carter – Collinson's alias in Quesada
- Ralph Coleman – member of Temple of the Holy Grail cult
- Eric Collinson – Gabrielle's fiancé, employed at Spear, Camp and Duffy
- Hubert Collinson – Eric's father
- Laurence Collinson – Eric's older brother
- Daisy Cotton – Dick Cotton's wife
- Dick Cotton – Quesada marshal
- Alice Dain – Mrs. Leggett's maiden name
- Lily Dain – Alice's sister, Gabrielle's mother
- Warren Daley – the Leggetts' neighbor
- Debro – "Carters'" nearest neighbor in Quesada
- Sheriff Feeney – in Quesada
- Mrs. Fink – employee at Temple of the Holy Grail
- Tom Fink – special effects man at Temple of the Holy Grail
- Owen Fitzstephan – a writer and friend of the Op
- Dick Foley – Continental detective
- Big-foot Gerber – cigar store owner
- Aaronia Haldorn – Joseph's wife
- Joseph Haldorn – head of Temple of the Holy Grail cult
- Manuel Haldorn – Joseph and Aaronia's son
- Watt Halstead – of Halstead and Beauchamp, a jeweler
- Mr. & Mrs. Harper – Gabrielle's mysterious friends
- Minnie Hershey – the Leggett's servant
- Jacques Labaud – Mayenne/Leggett's fellow convict/escapee
- Gabrielle Leggett – daughter of Edgar Leggett
- Edgar Leggett – Gabrielle's father, a scientist
- Mrs. Leggett, née Alice Dain
- Mickey Linehan – Continental operative
- MacMan - Continental operative
- Walter Martin – Mayenne/Leggett's alias
- Al Mason – Continental operative
- Maurice Pierre de Mayenne – Edgar Legett's real name
- Mary Nunez – "Carters'" servant
- O'Gar – homicide detail detective sergeant, San Francisco Police Department
- The Old Man - head of the Continental Detective Agency
- Mrs. Priestly – neighbor of the Leggetts
- Pat Reddy – O'Gar's partner, San Francisco Police Department
- Dr. Riese – doctor responding to finding of Leggett's body, Gabrielle's doctor
- Mrs. Livingston Rodman – member of Temple of the Holy Grail cult
- Ben Rolly – Quesada deputy sheriff
- Harry Ruppert – Upton's employee
- Jack Santos - a San Francisco reporter
- Rhino Tingley – Minnie's boyfriend
- Louis Upton – private detective from New York
- Vernon – Quesada district attorney
- Harve Whidden – witness who saw Gabrielle and a man driving away in Quesada

== TV miniseries adaptation ==
The novel was adapted into a CBS television miniseries in 1978, by director E.W. Swackhamer and producer Martin Poll, which starred James Coburn (as the Op, given the name "Hamilton Nash" for this film version), Hector Elizondo (as Ben Feeney), Jean Simmons (as Aaronia Haldorn), Jason Miller (as Owen Fitzstephan), Beatrice Straight (as Alice Leggett), Paul Stewart (as the Old Man), Nancy Addison (as Gabrielle Leggett), Tom Bower (as Sergeant O'Gar), David Canary (as Jack Santos), Beeson Carroll (as Marshall Cotton), Roland Winters (as Hubert Collinson) and a pre-Star Trek Brent Spiner (as Tom Fink).

It received three Emmy Award nominations (one for the director, one for Straight). The script, by Robert W. Lenski, won the 1978 Edgar Award for Best Television Feature or Miniseries.

An edited version of the series was released on VHS in the 1990s; a complete, full-length, two-disc DVD edition is available.

Coburn said "We went for a mood piece and a lot of it worked. For television, it was pretty good. Still, we had to fight the network (CBS) to make it the way we intended to do it. We didn’t want too many close-ups. They didn’t understand. They said this is television and that’s not the way to shoot it Well, I said, ‘fuck ‘em, let’s shoot it like a film’, and you know what?, we did for the most part.”
