= Dashiell Hammett =

American writer (1894–1961)

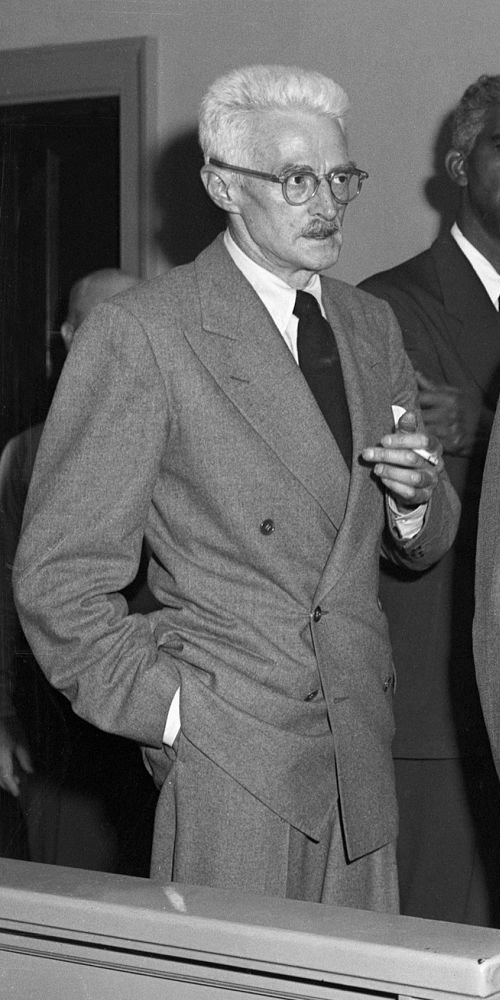
- Hammett in 1951
- Born: Samuel Dashiell Hammett; May 27, 1894; St. Mary's County, Maryland, U.S.
- Died: January 10, 1961 (aged 66); Manhattan, New York City, U.S.
- Resting place: Arlington National Cemetery, Virginia, U.S.
- Occupations: Novelist; political activist; screenwriter
- Spouse: Josephine Dolan (m. 1921; div. 1937)
- Partner: Lillian Hellman (1931–1961)
- Children: 2
- Writing career
- Period: 1929–1951
- Genres: Crime and detective fiction
- Works related to Dashiell Hammett at Wikisource
- Military career
- Allegiance: United States
- Branch: United States Army
- Service years: 1918-1919, 1942-1945
- Rank: Sergeant
- Conflicts: World War I, World War II

Samuel Dashiell Hammett (/dəˈʃiːl ˈhæmɪt/ duh-SHEEL HAM-it; May 27, 1894 – January 10, 1961) was an American writer of hard-boiled detective novels and short stories. He was also a screenwriter and political activist. Among the characters he created are Sam Spade (The Maltese Falcon), Nick and Nora Charles (The Thin Man), The Continental Op (Red Harvest and The Dain Curse) and the comic strip character Secret Agent X-9.

Hammett is regarded as one of the best mystery writers. In his obituary in The New York Times, he was described as "the dean of the... 'hard-boiled' school of detective fiction." Time included Hammett's 1929 novel Red Harvest on its list of the 100 best English-language novels published between 1923 and 2005. In 1990, the Crime Writers' Association picked three of his five novels for their list of The Top 100 Crime Novels of All Time. Five years later, The Maltese Falcon placed second on The Top 100 Mystery Novels of All Time as selected by the Mystery Writers of America; Red Harvest, The Glass Key and The Thin Man were also on the list. His novels and stories also had a significant influence on mystery films, including the style that came to be known as film noir.

== Early life ==
Hammett was born near Great Mills on the "Hopewell and Aim" farm in Saint Mary's County, Maryland, to Richard Thomas Hammett and his wife Anne Bond Dashiell. His mother belonged to an old Maryland family, whose name in French was de Chiel. He had an elder sister, Aronia, and a younger brother, Richard Jr. Known as Sam, Hammett was baptized a Catholic and grew up in Philadelphia and Baltimore. Hammett's family moved to Baltimore when he was four years old in 1898, and for the most part, it was the city where he lived until he left permanently in 1920 when he was 26 years old. As a teen, Hammett attended the Baltimore Polytechnic Institute, but his formal education ended during his first year of high school; he dropped out in 1908, when he was thirteen years old, due to his father's declining health and the need for him to earn money to support the family.

Hammett then held several jobs before working for the Pinkerton National Detective Agency. He served as an operative for Pinkerton from 1915 to February 1922, with time off to serve in World War I. While working for Pinkerton in Baltimore, he learned the trade and worked in the Continental Trust Building (now One Calvert Plaza). He said that while with the Pinkertons he was sent to Butte, Montana, during miners' union strikes, though some researchers doubt this really happened. The agency's role in strike-breaking eventually left him disillusioned.

Hammett enlisted in 1918 and served in the United States Army Ambulance Service. He was afflicted during that time with the Spanish flu and later contracted tuberculosis. He spent most of his time in the Army as a patient at Cushman Hospital in Tacoma, Washington, where he met a nurse, Josephine Dolan, whom he married on July 7, 1921, in San Francisco.

== Marriage and family ==
Hammett and Dolan had two daughters, Mary Jane (born 1921) and Josephine (born 1926). Shortly after the birth of their second child, health services nurses informed Dolan that, owing to Hammett's tuberculosis, she and the children should not live with him full time. Dolan rented a home in San Francisco, where Hammett would visit on weekends. The marriage soon fell apart; however, he continued to support his wife and daughters with the income he made from his writing.

== Career and personal life ==
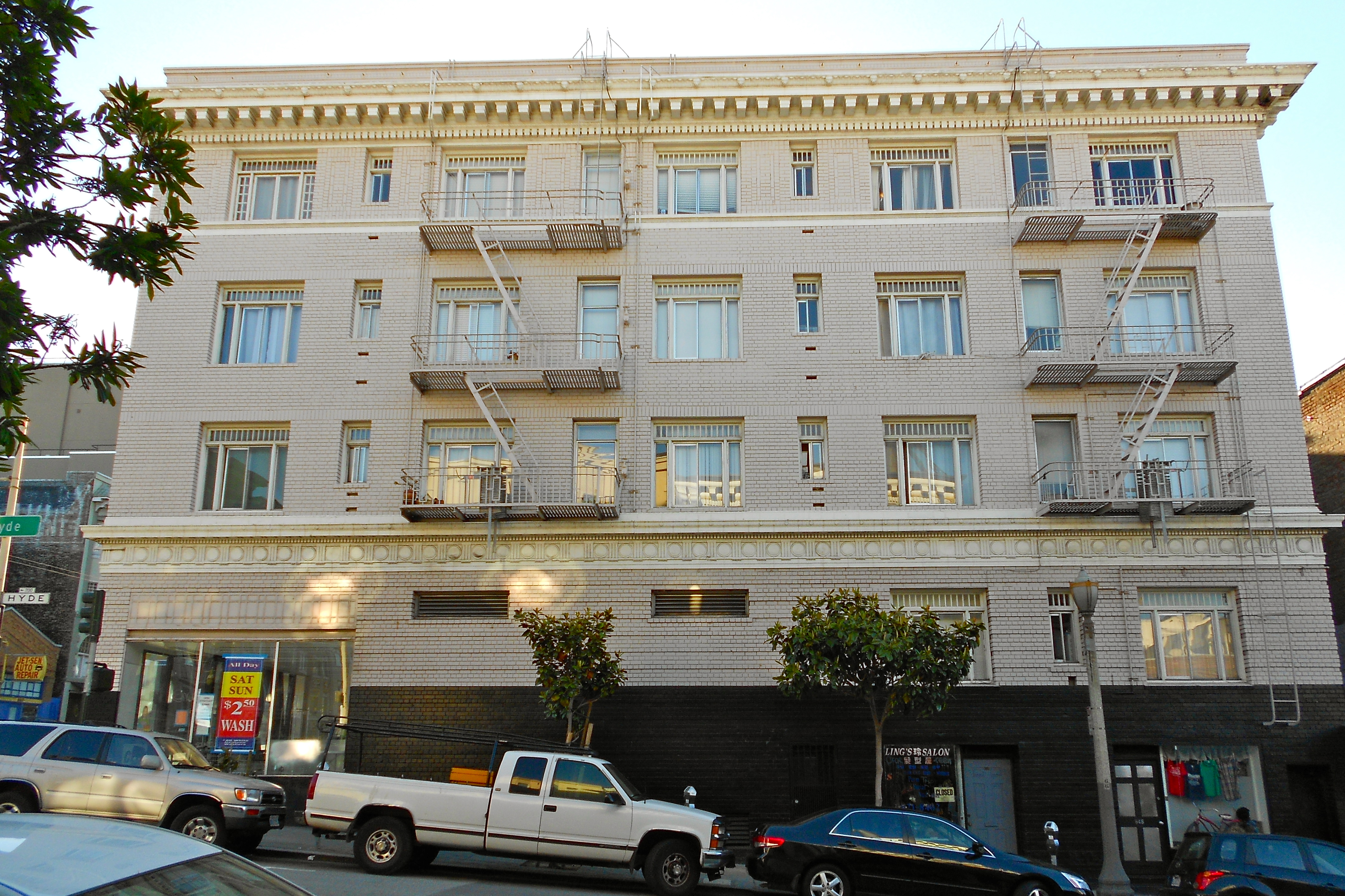
Building at 891 Post Street, San Francisco, where Hammett lived while writing The Maltese Falcon: The character Sam Spade may have also lived in the building.

Hammett was first published in 1922 in the magazine The Smart Set. Known for the authenticity and realism of his writing, he drew on his experiences as a Pinkerton operative. Hammett wrote most of his detective fiction while he was living in San Francisco in the 1920s; streets and other locations in San Francisco are frequently mentioned in his stories. He said, "I do take most of my characters from real life." His novels were some of the first to use dialogue that sounded authentic to the era. "I distrust a man that says when. If he's got to be careful not to drink too much, it's because he's not to be trusted when he does."

The bulk of his early work, featuring a nameless private investigator, The Continental Op, appeared in leading crime-fiction pulp magazine Black Mask. Both Hammett and the magazine struggled in the period when Hammett became established.

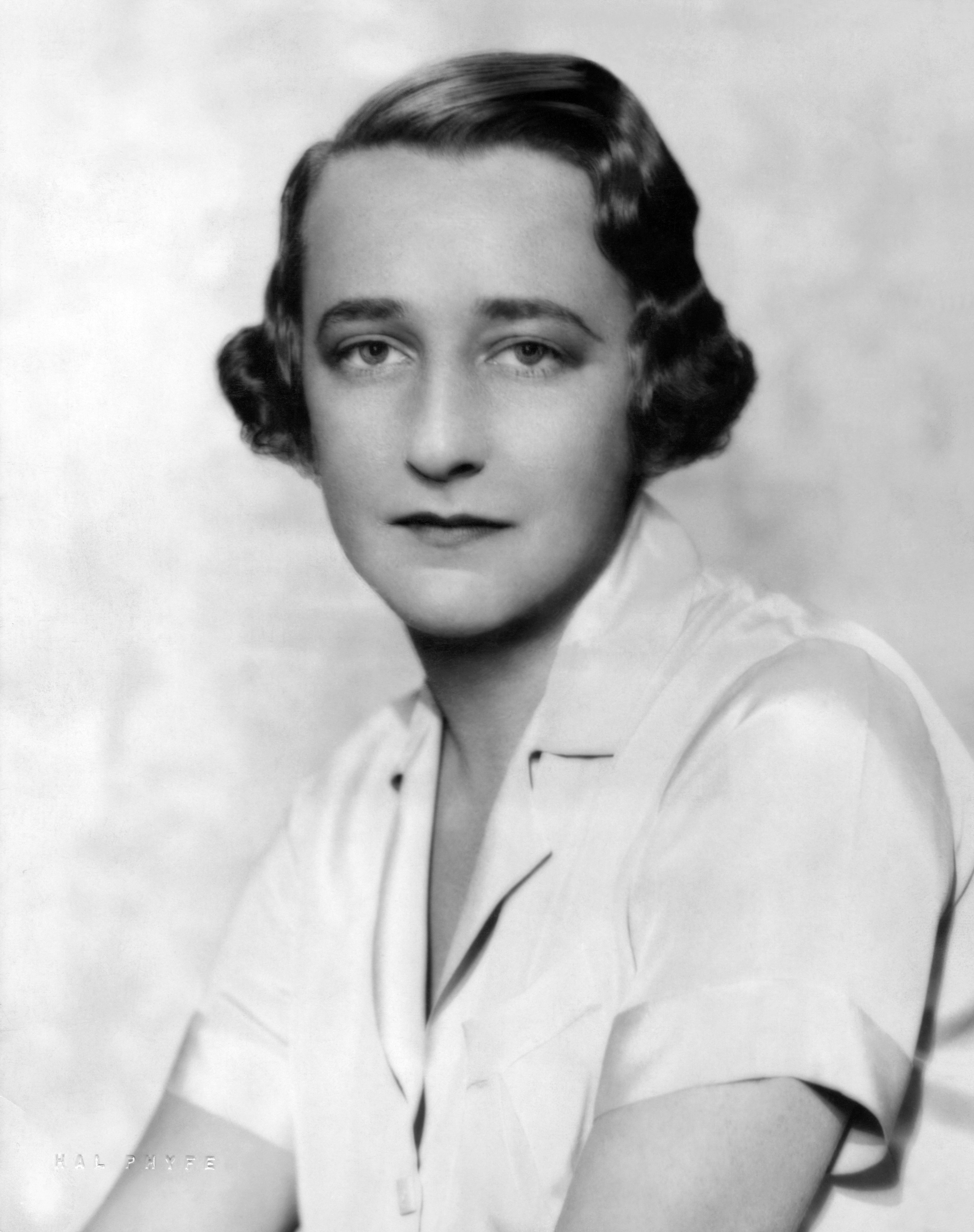
Lillian Hellman in 1935

Because of a disagreement with editor Philip C. Cody about money owed from previous stories, Hammett briefly stopped writing for Black Mask in 1926. He then took a full-time job as an advertisement copywriter for the Albert S. Samuels Co., a San Francisco jeweller. He was wooed back to writing for the Black Mask by Joseph Thompson Shaw, who became the new editor in the summer of 1926. Hammett dedicated his first novel, Red Harvest, to Shaw and his second novel, The Dain Curse, to Samuels. Both these novels and his third, The Maltese Falcon, and fourth, The Glass Key, were first serialized in Black Mask before being revised and edited for publication by Alfred A. Knopf. The Maltese Falcon, considered to be his best work, is dedicated to his wife Josephine.

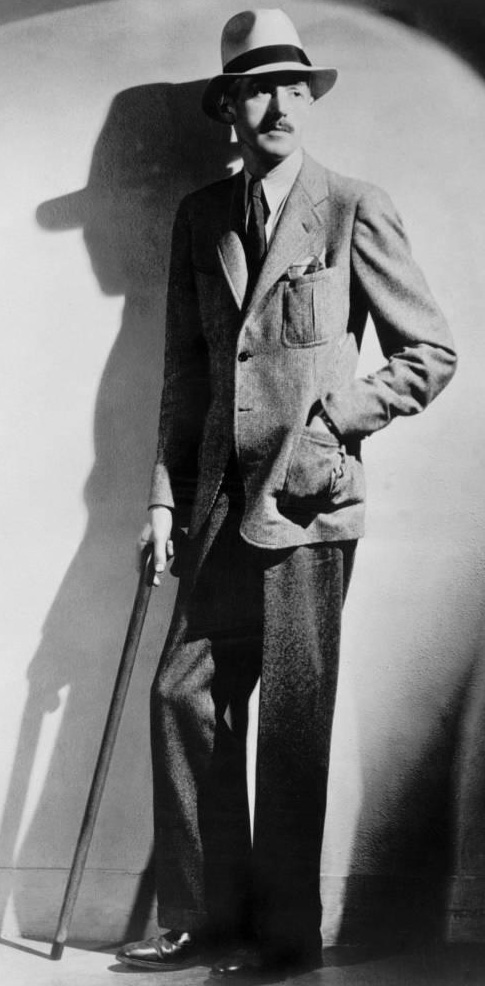
Photo portrait of Hammett from the cover of his final novel, The Thin Man (1934)

For much of 1929 and 1930, he was romantically involved with Nell Martin, a writer of short stories and several novels. He dedicated The Glass Key to her, and in turn she dedicated her novel Lovers Should Marry to him. In 1931, Hammett embarked on a 30-year romantic relationship with the playwright Lillian Hellman. Though he sporadically continued to work on material, he wrote his final novel in 1933, more than 25 years before his death. The Thin Man is dedicated to Hellman. Why he moved away from fiction is not certain; Hellman speculated in a posthumous collection of Hammett's novels, "I think, but I only think, I know a few of the reasons: he wanted to do new kind of work; he was sick for many of those years and getting sicker." In the 1940s, Hellman and he lived at her home, Hardscrabble Farm, in Pleasantville, New York.

The French novelist André Gide thought highly of Hammett, stating: "I regard his Red Harvest as a remarkable achievement, the last word in atrocity, cynicism and horror. Dashiell Hammett's dialogues, in which every character is trying to deceive all the others and in which the truth slowly becomes visible through a fog of deception, can be compared only with the best in Hemingway."

== Politics and service in World War II ==
Hammett devoted much of his life to left-wing activism. He was a staunch antifascist throughout the 1930s, and in 1937 joined the Communist Party. On May 1, 1935, Hammett joined the League of American Writers (1935–1943), whose members included Lillian Hellman, Alexander Trachtenberg of International Publishers, Frank Folsom, Louis Untermeyer, I. F. Stone, Myra Page, Millen Brand, Clifford Odets, and Arthur Miller. (Members were largely either Communist Party members or fellow travelers.) He suspended his anti-fascist activities when, as a member (and in 1941 president) of the League of American Writers, he served on its Keep America Out of War Committee in January 1940 during the period of the Molotov–Ribbentrop Pact.

Especially in Red Harvest, literary scholars have seen a Marxist critique of the social system. One Hammett biographer, Richard Layman, calls such interpretations "imaginative", but he nonetheless objects to them, since, among other reasons, no "masses of politically dispossessed people" are in this novel. Herbert Ruhm found that contemporary left-wing media already viewed Hammett's writing with skepticism, "perhaps because his work suggests no solution: no mass-action... no individual salvation... no Emersonian reconciliation and transcendence". In a letter of November 25, 1937, to his daughter Mary, Hammett referred to himself and others as "we reds". He confirmed, "in a democracy all men are supposed to have an equal say in their government", but added that "their equality need not go beyond that." He also found, "under socialism there is not necessarily... any leveling of incomes."

Hellman wrote that Hammett was "most certainly" a Marxist, though a "very critical Marxist" who was "often contemptuous of the Soviet Union" and "bitingly sharp about the American Communist Party", to which he was nevertheless loyal.

At the beginning of 1942, he wrote the screenplay of Watch on the Rhine, based on Hellman's successful play, which received a nomination for the Academy Award for Best Writing (Adapted Screenplay). However, that year the Oscar went to Casablanca. In early 1942, following the attack on Pearl Harbor, Hammett again enlisted in the United States Army. Because he was 48 years old, had tuberculosis, and was a Communist, Hammett later stated he had "a hell of a time" being inducted into the Army. However, biographer Diane Johnson suggests that confusion over Hammett's forenames was the reason he was able to re-enlist. He served as an enlisted man in the Aleutian Islands and initially worked on cryptanalysis on the island of Umnak. He was stationed briefly at Fort Richardson near Anchorage, Alaska. For fear of his radical tendencies, he was transferred to the Headquarters Company where he edited an Army newspaper entitled The Adakian along with the Abraham Lincoln Brigade veteran (and later professor) Robert Garland Colodny. In 1943, while still a member of the military, he co-authored The Battle of the Aleutians with Cpl. Colodny, under the direction of an infantry intelligence officer, Major Henry W. Hall. While in the Aleutians, he developed emphysema.

In 1945, Hammett was one of 16 Army officers and enlisted men singled out as alleged Communists by the House Committee on Military Affairs. General "Wild Bill" Donovan came to their defense, citing their loyalty and effectiveness. After the war, Hammett returned to political activism, "but he played that role with less fervour than before". He was elected president of the Civil Rights Congress (CRC) on June 5, 1946, at a meeting held at the Hotel Diplomat in New York City, and "devoted the largest portion of his working time to CRC activities".

In 1946, a bail fund was created by the CRC "to be used at the discretion of three trustees to gain the release of defendants arrested for political reasons." The trustees were Hammett, who was chairman, Robert W. Dunn, and Frederick Vanderbilt Field.

The CRC was designated a Communist front group by the US Attorney General. Hammett endorsed Henry A. Wallace in the 1948 United States presidential election.

== Imprisonment and the blacklist ==
The CRC's bail fund gained national attention on November 4, 1949, when bail in the amount of "$260,000 in negotiable government bonds" was posted "to free eleven men appealing against their convictions under the Smith Act for criminal conspiracy to teach and advocate the overthrow of the United States government by force and violence." On July 2, 1951, their appeals exhausted, four of the convicted men fled rather than surrender themselves to federal agents and begin serving their sentences. The United States District Court for the Southern District of New York issued subpoenas to the trustees of the CRC bail fund in an attempt to learn the whereabouts of the fugitives.

Hammett testified on July 9, 1951, in front of United States District Court Judge Sylvester Ryan, facing questioning by Irving Saypol, the United States Attorney for the Southern District of New York, described by Time as "the nation's number-one legal hunter of top Communists". During the hearing, Hammett refused to provide the information the government wanted, specifically the list of contributors to the bail fund, "people who might be sympathetic enough to harbor the fugitives." Instead, on every question regarding the CRC or the bail fund, Hammett declined to answer, citing the Fifth Amendment, refusing to even identify his signature or initials on CRC documents the government had subpoenaed. As soon as his testimony concluded, Hammett was found guilty of contempt of court.

Hammett served his sentence in a West Virginia federal penitentiary, where, according to Lillian Hellman, he was assigned to clean toilets. Hellman noted in her eulogy of Hammett that he submitted to prison rather than reveal the names of the contributors to the fund because "he had come to the conclusion that a man should keep his word."

By 1952, Hammett's popularity had declined as result of the hearings. He found himself impoverished due to a combination of the cancellation of radio programs The Adventures of Sam Spade and The Adventures of the Thin Man, and a lien on his income by the Internal Revenue Service for back taxes owed since 1943. Furthermore, his books were no longer in print.

== Later years and death ==
During the 1950s Hammett was investigated by Congress. He testified on March 26, 1953, before the House Committee on Un-American Activities about his own activities, but refused to cooperate with the committee. No official action was taken, but his stand caused him to be blacklisted, along with others who were blacklisted as a result of McCarthyism.

Hammett became an alcoholic before working in advertising, and alcoholism continued to trouble him until 1948, when he quit under doctor's orders. However, years of heavy drinking and smoking worsened the tuberculosis he contracted in World War I, and then, according to Hellman, "jail had made a thin man thinner, a sick man sicker ... I knew he would now always be sick."

Hellman wrote that during the 1950s, Hammett became "a hermit", his decline evident in the clutter of his rented "ugly little country cottage", where "signs of sickness were all around: now the phonograph was unplayed, the typewriter untouched, the beloved foolish gadgets unopened in their packages." He may have meant to start a new literary life with the novel Tulip, but left it unfinished, perhaps because he was "just too ill to care, too worn out to listen to plans or read contracts. The fact of breathing, just breathing, took up all the days and nights." Hammett could no longer live alone, and they both knew it, so he spent the last four years of his life with Hellman. "Not all of that time was easy, and some of it very bad", she wrote, but, "guessing death was not too far away, I would try for something to have afterwards."

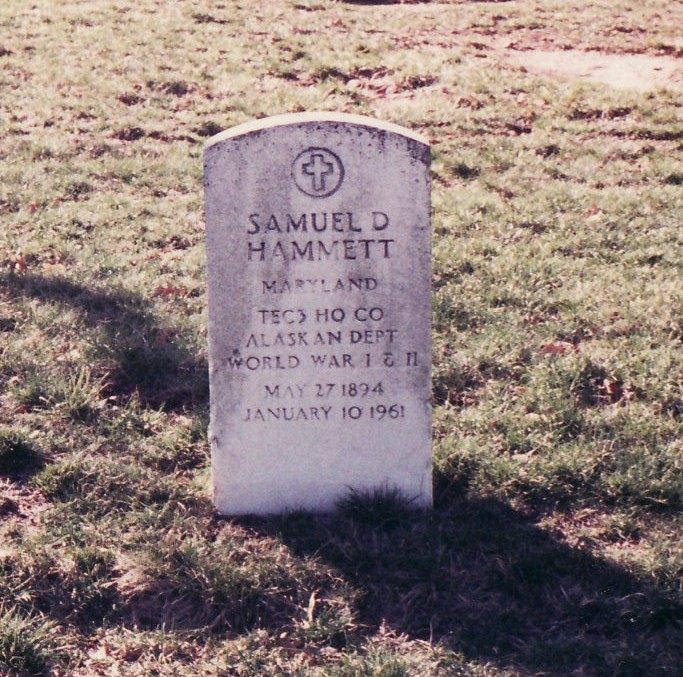
Hammett's grave, in Arlington National Cemetery, (section 12, site 508)

Hammett died in Lenox Hill Hospital in Manhattan on January 10, 1961, of lung cancer, diagnosed just two months beforehand.

A veteran of both world wars, Hammett is buried at Arlington National Cemetery.

== Archive ==
Many of Hammett's papers are held by the Harry Ransom Center at the University of Texas at Austin. This archive includes manuscripts and personal correspondence, along with a small group of miscellaneous notes.

The Irvin Department of Rare Books and Special Collections at the University of South Carolina holds the Dashiell Hammett family papers.

== Legacy ==
Hammett's relationship with Lillian Hellman was portrayed in the 1977 film Julia. Jason Robards won an Oscar for his depiction of Hammett, and Jane Fonda was nominated for her portrayal of Lillian Hellman.

Hammett was the subject of a 1982 prime time PBS biography, The Case of Dashiell Hammett, that won a Peabody Award and a special Edgar Allan Poe Award from the Mystery Writers of America.

Frederic Forrest portrayed Hammett semifictionally as the protagonist in the 1982 film Hammett, based on the novel of the same name by Joe Gores. He would reprise the role of Hammett in the 1992 made-for-TV film Citizen Cohn.

Sam Shepard played Hammett in the 1999 Emmy-nominated biographical television film Dash and Lilly along with Judy Davis as Hellman.

Hammett's influence on popular culture has continued well after his death. For example, in 1975, the film The Black Bird starred George Segal in the role of Sam Spade Jr.; the film was a sequel and parody of the Maltese Falcon. The 1976 comedic film Murder by Death spoofed a number of famous literary sleuths, including several of Hammett's. The film's characters included Sam Diamond and Dick and Dora Charleston, which were parodies of Hammett's Sam Spade and Nick and Nora Charles. In 2006, Rachel Cohn published the YA novel, Nick & Norah's Infinite Playlist, whose main characters were named for the sleuths in Hammett's Thin Man series. The book was made into a film of the same name and released in 2008. Later, Rachel Cohn and David Levithan authored several books whose main characters are named for Hammett and his partner. In 2011, they published the YA suspenseful romance, Dash & Lily's Book of Dares. That was followed by the sequels The Twelve Days of Dash and Lily in 2016 and Mind the Gap, Dash & Lily in 2020. The book series was made into a Netflix television series.

Raymond Chandler, often considered Hammett's successor, summarized his accomplishments in his essay "The Simple Art of Murder":

Hammett gave murder back to the kind of people that commit it for reasons, not just to provide a corpse; and with the means at hand, not with hand-wrought dueling pistols, curare, and tropical fish... He is said to have lacked heart, yet the story he thought most of himself [The Glass Key] is the record of a man's devotion to a friend. He was spare, frugal, hard-boiled, but he did over and over again what only the best writers can ever do at all. He wrote scenes that seemed never to have been written before.

== Bibliography ==
=== Novels ===
- Red Harvest. New York: Alfred A. Knopf. 1929.
- The Dain Curse. New York: Alfred A. Knopf. 1929.
- The Maltese Falcon. New York: Alfred A. Knopf. 1930.
- The Glass Key. New York: Alfred A. Knopf. 1931.
- The Thin Man. New York: Alfred A. Knopf. 1934.

=== Short stories ===
Currently, 82 complete and standalone short stories are known to have been written by Dashiell Hammett. They are listed below in the order of initial publication. Unfinished writings, fragments, drafts, screen stories, and stories that were later reworked into novels are listed separately below.

Complete and Standalone Short Stories
Title	First Publication	Most Recent Collection	Note
"The Parthian Shot"	The Smart Set, October 1922	Collected Stories: Volume 1: 1922–1924 (2025)	
"Immortality"	10 Story Book, November 1922	Collected Stories: Volume 1: 1922–1924 (2025)	Written as Daghull Hammett
"The Barber and His Wife"	Brief Stories, December 1922	Collected Stories: Volume 1: 1922–1924 (2025)	Written as Peter Collinson, the first story written by Hammett but was initially rejected.
"The Road Home"	Black Mask, December 1922	Collected Stories: Volume 1: 1922–1924 (2025)	Written as Peter Collinson
"The Master Mind"	The Smart Set, January 1923	Collected Stories: Volume 1: 1922–1924 (2025)	
"The Sardonic Star of Tom Doody"	Brief Stories, February 1923	Collected Stories: Volume 1: 1922–1924 (2025)	Written as Peter Collinson, reprinted elsewhere as "Wages of Crime"
"The Vicious Circle"	Black Mask, June 15, 1923	Collected Stories: Volume 1: 1922–1924 (2025)	Written as Peter Collinson, reprinted elsewhere as "The Man Who Stood in the Way"
"The Joke on Eloise Morey"	Brief Stories, June 1923	Collected Stories: Volume 1: 1922–1924 (2025)	
"Holiday"	The New Pearson's, July 1923	Collected Stories: Volume 1: 1922–1924 (2025)	
"The Crusader"	The Smart Set, August 1923	Collected Stories: Volume 1: 1922–1924 (2025)	Written as Mary Jane Hammett
"Arson Plus"	Black Mask, October 1, 1923	Collected Stories: Volume 1: 1922–1924 (2025)	Written as Peter Collinson
"The Dimple"	Saucy Stories, October 15, 1923	Collected Stories: Volume 1: 1922–1924 (2025)	Reprinted elsewhere as "In the Morgue"
"Crooked Souls"	Black Mask, October 15, 1923	Collected Stories: Volume 1: 1922–1924 (2025)	Reprinted elsewhere as "The Gatewood Caper"
"Slippery Fingers"	Black Mask, October 15, 1923	Collected Stories: Volume 1: 1922–1924 (2025)	Written as Peter Collinson
"The Green Elephant"	The Smart Set, October 1923	Collected Stories: Volume 1: 1922–1924 (2025)	
"It"	Black Mask, November 1, 1923	Collected Stories: Volume 1: 1922–1924 (2025)	Reprinted elsewhere as "The Black Hat That Wasn't There"
"The Second-Story Angel"	Black Mask, November 15, 1923	Collected Stories: Volume 1: 1922–1924 (2025)	
"Laughing Masks"	Action Stories, November 1923	Collected Stories: Volume 1: 1922–1924 (2025)	Written as Peter Collinson, reprinted elsewhere as "When Luck's Running Good"
"Bodies Piled Up"	Black Mask, December 1, 1923	Collected Stories: Volume 1: 1922–1924 (2025)	Reprinted elsewhere as "House Dick"
"Itchy"	Brief Stories, January 1924	Collected Stories: Volume 1: 1922–1924 (2025)	Written as Peter Collinson, reprinted elsewhere as "Itchy the Debonair"
"The Tenth Clew"	Black Mask, January 1, 1924	Collected Stories: Volume 1: 1922–1924 (2025)	Sometimes spelled "The Tenth Clue"
"The Man Who Killed Dan Odams"	Black Mask, January 15, 1924	Collected Stories: Volume 1: 1922–1924 (2025)	
"Night Shots"	Black Mask, February 1, 1924	Collected Stories: Volume 1: 1922–1924 (2025)	
"The New Racket"	Black Mask, February 15, 1924	Collected Stories: Volume 1: 1922–1924 (2025)	Reprinted elsewhere as "The Judge Laughed Last"
"Esther Entertains"	Brief Stories, February 1924	Collected Stories: Volume 1: 1922–1924 (2025)	
"Afraid of a Gun"	Black Mask, March 1, 1924	Collected Stories: Volume 1: 1922–1924 (2025)	
"Zigzags of Treachery"	Black Mask, March 1, 1924	Collected Stories: Volume 1: 1922–1924 (2025)	
"One Hour"	Black Mask, April 1, 1924	Collected Stories: Volume 1: 1922–1924 (2025)	
"The House in Turk Street"	Black Mask, April 15, 1924	Collected Stories: Volume 1: 1922–1924 (2025)	
"The Girl with the Silver Eyes"	Black Mask, June 1924	Collected Stories: Volume 2: 1924–1925 (2025)	
"Women, Politics and Murder"	Black Mask, September 1924	Collected Stories: Volume 2: 1924–1925 (2025)	Reprinted elsewhere as "Death on Pine Street" and "A Tale of Two Women"
"The Golden Horseshoe"	Black Mask, November 1924	Collected Stories: Volume 2: 1924–1925 (2025)	
"Who Killed Bob Teal?"	True Detective Stories, November 1924	Collected Stories: Volume 2: 1924–1925 (2025)	
"Nightmare Town"	Argosy All-Story Weekly, December 27, 1924	Collected Stories: Volume 2: 1924–1925 (2025)	
"Mike, Alec or Rufus?"	Black Mask, January 1925	Collected Stories: Volume 2: 1924–1925 (2025)	Reprinted elsewhere as "Tom, Dick or Harry?"
"Another Perfect Crime"	Experience, February 1925	Collected Stories: Volume 2: 1924–1925 (2025)	
"The Whosis Kid"	Black Mask, March 1925	Collected Stories: Volume 2: 1924–1925 (2025)	
"Ber-Bulu"	Sunset Magazine, March 1925	Collected Stories: Volume 2: 1924–1925 (2025)	Reprinted elsewhere as "The Hairy One"
"The Scorched Face"	Black Mask, May 1925	Collected Stories: Volume 2: 1924–1925 (2025)	
"Corkscrew"	Black Mask, September 1925	Collected Stories: Volume 2: 1924–1925 (2025)	
"Ruffian's Wife"	Sunset Magazine, October 1925	Collected Stories: Volume 2: 1924–1925 (2025)	
"Dead Yellow Women"	Black Mask, November 1925	Collected Stories: Volume 3: 1925–1929 (2025)	
"The Glass That Laughed"	True Police Stories, November 1925		Rediscovered in 2017 and published online by Electric Literature
"The Gutting of Couffignal"	Black Mask, December 1925	Collected Stories: Volume 3: 1925–1929 (2025)	
"The Nails in Mr. Cayterer"	Black Mask, January 1926	Collected Stories: Volume 3: 1925–1929 (2025)	
"The Assistant Murderer"	Black Mask, February 1926	Collected Stories: Volume 3: 1925–1929 (2025)	Reprinted elsewhere as "First Aide to Murder"
"Creeping Siamese"	Black Mask, March 1926	Collected Stories: Volume 3: 1925–1929 (2025)	
"The Advertising Man Writes a Love Letter"	Judge, February 26, 1927	Lost Stories (2005)	
"The Big Knock-Over"	Black Mask, February 1927	Collected Stories: Volume 3: 1925–1929 (2025)	
"$106,000 Blood Money"	Black Mask, May 1927	Collected Stories: Volume 3: 1925–1929 (2025)	
"The Main Death"	Black Mask, June 1927	Collected Stories: Volume 3: 1925–1929 (2025)	
"This King Business"	Mystery Stories, January 1928	Collected Stories: Volume 3: 1925–1929 (2025)	
"Fly Paper"	Black Mask, August 1929	Collected Stories: Volume 3: 1925–1929 (2025)	
"The Farewell Murder"	Black Mask, February 1930	Collected Stories: Volume 3: 1925–1929 (2025)	
"Death and Company"	Black Mask, November 1930	Collected Stories: Volume 3: 1925–1929 (2025)	
"On the Way"	Harper’s Bazaar, March 1932	The Hunter and Other Stories (2013)	
"A Man Called Spade"	American Magazine, July 1932	Nightmare Town (1999)	
"Too Many Have Lived"	American Magazine, October 1932	Nightmare Town (1999)	
"They Can Only Hang You Once"	Collier's, November 19, 1932	Nightmare Town (1999)	
"Woman in the Dark" (3 parts)	Liberty, April 8, 15, & 22, 1933	Crime Stories and Other Writings (2001)	
"Night Shade"	Mystery League Magazine, October 1, 1933	Lost Stories (2005)	
"Albert Pastor at Home"	Esquire, Autumn 1933	Nightmare Town (1948)	
"Two Sharp Knives"	Collier's, January 13, 1934	Crime Stories and Other Writings (2001)	Reprinted elsewhere as "To a Sharp Knife"
"His Brother's Keeper"	Collier's, February 17, 1934	Nightmare Town (1999)	
"This Little Pig"	Collier's, March 24, 1934	Lost Stories (2005)	
"A Man Named Thin"	Ellery Queen's Mystery Magazine, March 1961	Nightmare Town (1999)	Written in the mid-1920s under the title "The Figure of Incongruity" but was not published until 1961.
"Seven Pages"	Discovering the Maltese Falcon and Sam Spade (2005)	The Hunter and Other Stories (2013)	
"Faith"	The Black Lizard Big Book of Pulps (2007)	The Hunter and Other Stories (2013)	
Untitled	The Strand Magazine, Feb-May, 2011 under the title "So I Shot Him"	The Hunter and Other Stories (2013) under the title "The Cure"	
"The Hunter"	The Hunter and Other Stories (2013)		
"The Sign of the Potent Pills"	The Hunter and Other Stories (2013)		
"Action and the Quiz Kid"	The Hunter and Other Stories (2013)		
"Fragments of Justice"	The Hunter and Other Stories (2013)		
"A Throne for the Worm"	The Hunter and Other Stories (2013)		
"Magic"	The Hunter and Other Stories (2013)		
"An Inch and a Half of Glory"	The Hunter and Other Stories (2013)		
"Nelson Redline"	The Hunter and Other Stories (2013)		
"Monk and Johnny Fox"	The Hunter and Other Stories (2013)		
"The Breech-Born"	The Hunter and Other Stories (2013)		
"The Lovely Strangers"	The Hunter and Other Stories (2013)		
"Week-End"	The Hunter and Other Stories (2013)		
"The Man Who Loved Ugly Women"	Experience, date unknown		Lost

Miscellaneous Fictions
Title	First Publication	Most Recent Collection	Note
"The Cleansing of Poisonville"	Black Mask, November 1927	The Big Book of the Continental Op (2017)	Later reworked into Red Harvest
"Crime Wanted—Male or Female"	Black Mask, December 1927	The Big Book of the Continental Op (2017)	Later reworked into Red Harvest
"Dynamite"	Black Mask, January 1928	The Big Book of the Continental Op (2017)	Later reworked into Red Harvest
"The 19th Murder"	Black Mask, February 1928	The Big Book of the Continental Op (2017)	Later reworked into Red Harvest
"Black Lives"	Black Mask, November 1928	The Big Book of the Continental Op (2017)	Later reworked into The Dain Curse
"The Hollow Temple"	Black Mask, December 1928	The Big Book of the Continental Op (2017)	Later reworked into The Dain Curse
"Black Honeymoon"	Black Mask, January 1929	The Big Book of the Continental Op (2017)	Later reworked into The Dain Curse
"Black Riddle"	Black Mask, February 1929	The Big Book of the Continental Op (2017)	Later reworked into The Dain Curse
"The Maltese Falcon" (part 1 of 5)	Black Mask, September 1929	The Black Lizard Big Book of Black Mask Stories (2010)	Later reworked into The Maltese Falcon
"The Diamond Wager"	Detective Fiction Weekly, October 19, 1929	The Hunter and Other Stories (2013)	Written by Samuel Dashiell, who is long thought to be Dashiell Hammett, but Hammett's authorship is rejected by Will Murray.
"The Maltese Falcon" (part 2 of 5)	Black Mask, October 1929	The Black Lizard Big Book of Black Mask Stories (2010)	Later reworked into The Maltese Falcon
"The Maltese Falcon" (part 3 of 5)	Black Mask, November 1929	The Black Lizard Big Book of Black Mask Stories (2010)	Later reworked into The Maltese Falcon
"The Maltese Falcon" (part 4 of 5)	Black Mask, December 1929	The Black Lizard Big Book of Black Mask Stories (2010)	Later reworked into The Maltese Falcon
"The Maltese Falcon" (part 5 of 5)	Black Mask, January 1930	The Black Lizard Big Book of Black Mask Stories (2010)	Later reworked into The Maltese Falcon
"The Glass Key"	Black Mask, March 1930		Later reworked into The Glass Key
"The Cyclone Shot"	Black Mask, April 1930		Later reworked into The Glass Key
"Dagger Point"	Black Mask, May 1930		Later reworked into The Glass Key
"The Shattered Key"	Black Mask, June 1930		Later reworked into The Glass Key
"The Thin Man"	Redbook, December 1933		A condensed version of the novel
"The Thin Man and the Flack"	Click, December 1941	Lost Stories (2005)	Photo story
"Tulip"	The Big Knockover (1966)		Unfinished novel fragment
First draft of "The Thin Man"	City of San Francisco, Dashiell Hammett Special Issue, November 4, 1975	Crime Stories and Other Writings (2001) under the title "The Thin Man: an Early Typescript"	Also reprinted in Nightmare Town (1999) under the title "The First Thin Man"
"After the Thin Man" (2 parts)	The New Black Mask, no. 5 & 6, 1986	Return of the Thin Man (2012)	Screen story for After the Thin Man (1936)
"Another Thin Man"	Return of the Thin Man (2012)		Screen story for Another Thin Man (1939)
"Sequel to the Thin Man"	Return of the Thin Man (2012)		Screen story, unproduced
"The Kiss-Off"	The Hunter and Other Stories (2013)		Screen story for City Streets (1931)
"Devil's Playground"	The Hunter and Other Stories (2013)		Screen story, unproduced
"On the Make"	The Hunter and Other Stories (2013)		Screen story for Mister Dynamite (1935)
"A Knife Will Cut for Anybody"	The Hunter and Other Stories (2013)		Unfinished Sam Spade story
"The Secret Emperor"	The Hunter and Other Stories (2013) ebook bonus		Unfinished fragment
"Time to Die"	The Hunter and Other Stories (2013) ebook bonus		Unfinished fragment
"September 20, 1938"	The Hunter and Other Stories (2013) ebook bonus		Unfinished fragment
"Three Dimes"	The Big Book of the Continental Op (2017)		Unfinished Continental Op story

=== Short Stories Grouped by Characters ===
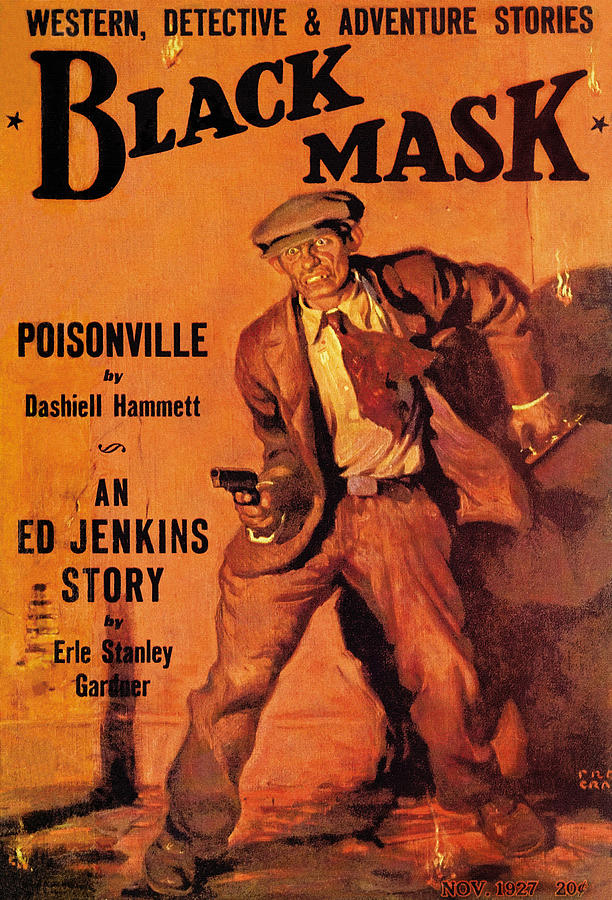
November 1927 issue of Black Mask, featuring "The Cleansing of Poisonville"

==== The Continental Op ====
All 28 Continental Op stories and one unfinished story have been collected in their original unabridged forms in The Big Book of the Continental Op (2017).

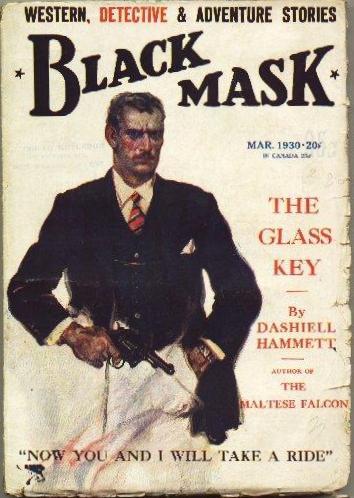
March 1930 issue of Black Mask magazine, featuring Hammett's The Glass Key

==== Sam Spade ====
1. The Maltese Falcon (initially a five-part serial from September 1929 to January 1930 in Black Mask)
2. "A Man Called Spade"
3. "Too Many Have Lived"
4. "They Can Only Hang You Once"
5. "A Knife Will Cut for Anybody" (unfinished)

==== Nick and Nora Charles ====
1. "A Man Named Thin"
2. First draft of "The Thin Man"
3. "After the Thin Man" (screen story)
4. "Another Thin Man" (screen story)
5. "Sequel to the Thin Man" (screen story)

=== Film ===
==== Screenplay ====
- Watch on the Rhine, 1943 (based on Hellman's play)

==== Screen story ====
- "The Kiss-Off" (screen story for City Streets, 1931)
- "Devil's Playground" (unproduced)
- "On the Make" (screen story for Mister Dynamite, 1935)
- "After the Thin Man" (screen story for After the Thin Man, 1936)
- "Another Thin Man" (screen story for Another Thin Man, 1939)
- "Sequel to the Thin Man" (unproduced)

=== Articles ===
- "The Great Lovers", The Smart Set, November 1922 (reprinted in Lost Stories, 2005)
- "From the Memoirs of a Private Detective", The Smart Set, March 1923
- "In Defence of the Sex Story", The Writer's Digest, June 1924
- "Three Favorites", Black Mask, November 1924, Short autobiographies of Francis James, Dashiell Hammett and C. J. Daly.
- "Vamping Sampson", The Editor, May 1925

==== On Advertising ====
- "The Advertisement IS Literature". Western Advertising. 9 (3): 35–36. October 1926.
- "Advertising Art Isn't Art —- It's Advertising". Western Advertising. 11 (5): 47–48. December 1927.
- "Have You Tried Meiosis?". Western Advertising. 11 (6): 60–61. January 1928.
- "The Literature of Advertising in 1927". Western Advertising. 12 (1): 154–156. February 1928.
- "The Editor Knows His Audience". Western Advertising. 12 (2): 45–46. March 1928.

Examples of Hammett's advertising copy for the Albert S. Samuels Company, a San Francisco jewelers, are given in:

- Carne, Hugh (October 1927). "Making Retail Advertising Stand Out". Western Advertising. 11 (3): 58–61, 82.

Starting in December 1925 and ending August 1926, there appeared monthly, in Western Advertising “Books Reviews by S. H.” Hammett is using not using D. but his other initial S. for Samuel.

=== Letters ===
- Layman, Richard; Rivett, Julie M., eds. (2001). Selected Letters of Dashiell Hammett: 1921–1960. Counterpoint Press. ISBN 978-1-582432-10-6.

=== Daily comic strips ===
- Secret Agent X-9. January 22, 1934 through April 20, 1935. Scripts by Hammett and illustrated by Alex Raymond. King Features Syndicate (appeared in most of William Randolph Hearst's newspapers)
  - "The Top", January 22, 1934 through September 11, 1934.
  - "The Mystery of the Silent Guns", September 12, 1934 through December 15, 1934.
  - "The Martyn Case", December 17, 1934 through March 9, 1935.

=== Other publications ===
- Creeps by Night; Chills and Thrills. John Day, 1931. (Anthology edited by Hammett with an introduction.)
- The Battle of the Aleutians. Field Force Headquarters, Adak, Alaska, 1944. (A pamphlet with text by Hammett and Robert Colodny and illustrations by Harry Fletcher.)

== Collections ==
=== Novels ===
- The Dashiell Hammett Omnibus. New York: Alfred A. Knopf. 1935. Includes Red Harvest, The Dain Curse and The Maltese Falcon.
- The Complete Dashiell Hammett. New York: Alfred A. Knopf. 1942.
- Dashiell Hammett's Mystery Omnibus. New York: World Publishing. 1944. Includes The Maltese Falcon and The Glass Key.
- The Novels of Dashiell Hammett. New York: Alfred A. Knopf. 1965.
- Dashiell Hammett: Five Complete Novels. Avenel Books. 1980.
- Marcus, Steven, ed. (1999). Complete Novels. New York: Library of America. ISBN 978-1-883011-67-3.
- The Dain Curse: The Glass Key; and Selected Stories. Everyman's Library Contemporary Classics. New York: Alfred A. Knopf. 2007. ISBN 978-0-307266-69-9.

=== Short fiction ===
After their initial publication in pulp magazines, most of Hammett's short stories were first collected in ten digest-sized paperbacks by Mercury Publications under an imprint, either Bestsellers Mystery, A Jonathan Press Mystery or Mercury Mystery. The stories were edited by Ellery Queen (Frederic Dannay) and were abridged versions of the original publications. Some of these digests were reprinted as hardcovers by World Publishing under the imprint Tower Books. The anthologies were also republished as Dell mapbacks. An important collection, The Big Knockover and Other Stories, edited by Lillian Hellman, helped revive Hammett's literary reputation in the 1960s and fostered a new series of anthologies. However, most of these used Dannay's abridged version of the stories.

The first collection that prints stories in their original unedited forms is Crime Stories & Other Writings (2001) edited by Steven Marcus (especially after the third printing that incorporates the original text of This King Business). Subsequent collections that print the original texts include Lost Stories (2005), The Hunter and Other Stories (2013), and The Big Book of the Continental Op (2017).

==== Mercury Publications ====
- $106,000 Blood Money. Bestseller Mystery B40, 1943. Collection of two connected Continental Op stories, "The Big Knockover" and "$106,000 Blood Money".
- The Adventures of Sam Spade. Bestseller Mystery B50, 1944. Collection of three Spade stories and four others.
- They Can Only Hang You Once and Other Stories. Mercury Mystery B50, 1949. Reprint of Bestseller Mystery B50.
- The Continental Op. Bestseller Mystery B62, 1945. Collection of four Continental Op stories.
- The Continental Op. Jonathan Press Mystery J40, 1949. Reprint of Bestseller Mystery B62.
- The Return of the Continental Op. Jonathan Press Mystery J17, 1945. Collection of five further Continental Op stories.
- Hammett Homicides. Bestseller Mystery B81, 1946. Collection of six stories, four of which feature the Continental Op.
- Dead Yellow Women. Jonathan Press Mystery J29, 1947. Collection of six stories, four of which feature the Continental Op.
- Nightmare Town. Mercury Mystery #120, 1948. Collection of four stories, two of which feature the Continental Op.
- The Creeping Siamese. Jonathan Press Mystery J48, 1950. Collection of six stories, three of which feature the Continental Op.
- Woman in the Dark. Jonathan Press Mystery J59, 1951. Collection of the three part novelette.
- A Man Named Thin. Mercury Mystery #233, 1962. Collection of eight stories, one of which features the Continental Op.

==== World Publishing ====
- Blood Money. Tower, 1943. Hardcover edition of Bestseller Mystery B40.
- The Adventures of Sam Spade and other stories. 1945. Hardcover edition of Bestseller Mystery B50.

==== Dell ====
- Blood Money. Dell #53, 1944. Mapback reprint of Bestseller Mystery B40.
- Blood Money. Dell #486, 1951. Mapback reprint of Bestseller Mystery B40.
- A Man Called Spade and Other Stories. Dell #90, 1945. Mapback reprint of Bestseller Mystery B50 but omits two stories: Nightshade and The Judge Laughed Last.
- A Man Called Spade and Other Stories. Dell #411, 1950. Reprint of Dell #90.
- A Man Called Spade and Other Stories. Dell #452, 1952. Reprint of Dell #90.
- The Continental Op. Dell #129, 1946. Reprint of Bestseller Mystery B62.
- The Return of the Continental Op. Dell #154, 1947. Reprint of Jonathan Press Mystery J17.
- Hammett Homicides. Dell #223, 1948. Mapback reprint of Bestseller Mystery B81.
- Dead Yellow Women. Dell #308, 1949. Mapback reprint of Jonathan Press Mystery J29.
- Dead Yellow Women. Dell #421, 1950. Mapback reprint of Jonathan Press Mystery J29.
- Nightmare Town. Dell #379, 1950. Mapback reprint of Mercury Mystery #120.
- The Creeping Siamese. Dell #538, 1951. Mapback reprint of Jonathan Press Mystery J48, 1950.

==== Later collections ====
Along with the novels, these later collections have been reprinted in paperback versions under many imprints: Vintage Crime, Black Lizard, Everyman's library.

- The Big Knockover. Random House, 1966. Including the unfinished novel Tulip.
- The Continental Op. Random House, 1974. Edited and with an introduction by Steven Marcus. Comprises 7 stories. ISBN 978-0-394487-04-5
- Woman in the Dark. Knopf, 1988. Hardcover collection of the three parts of the title novelette, with an introduction by Robert B. Parker. ISBN 978-0-394572-69-7
- Nightmare Town. Knopf, 1999. Hardcover collection, with contents different from the digest of the same title. ISBN 978-0-375401-11-4
- Crime Stories and Other Writings (Steven Marcus, ed.) (Library of America, 2001); ISBN 978-1-931082-00-6.
- Lost Stories. Vince Emery Productions, 2005. Collection of 21 stories that had not previously been published in hardcover, including some previously unpublished stories, with several long commentaries on Hammett's career providing context for the stories. Introduction by Joe Gores. ISBN 978-0-972589-81-9
- Vintage Hammett. New York: Vintage Books, 2005. Collection of nine stories of Sam Spade, Nick and Nora Charles, and The Continental Op. ISBN 978-1-400079-62-9
- The Hunter and Other Stories. Mysterious Press, 2013. Collection of previously unpublished or uncollected stories and screenplays, including a fragment of a second Sam Spade novel. Edited by Richard Layman and Julie M. Rivett. ISBN 978-0-802121-58-5
- The Black Lizard Big Book of Black Mask Stories. New York: Vintage Crime/Black Lizard, Vintage Books, a division of Penguin Random House LLC, [2010]. ISBN 978-0-307455-43-7 Reprints The Maltese Falcon in its original serialized form.
- The Big Book of the Continental Op. New York: Vintage Crime/Black Lizard, Vintage Books, a division of Penguin Random House LLC, [2017]. Collects all twenty-eight stories and two serialized novels starring Continental Op, plus the previously unpublished fragment "Three Dimes". ISBN 978-0-525432-95-1
- Collected Stories: Volume 1: 1922–1924. Seattle, WA: Sarnath Press, [2025]. First volume of the complete edition of Hammett's short fiction (including novelettes and novellas) and the first edition to print Hammett's stories in textually accurate form. Edited by S. T. Joshi. ISBN 979-8-308059-85-1
- Collected Stories: Volume 2: 1924–1925. Seattle, WA: Sarnath Press, [2025]. Second volume of the complete edition of Hammett's short fiction (including novelettes and novellas) and the first edition to print Hammett's stories in textually accurate form. Edited by S. T. Joshi. ISBN 979-8-316648-52-8
- Collected Stories: Volume 3: 1925–1929. Seattle, WA: Sarnath Press, [2025]. Third and final volume of the complete edition of Hammett's short fiction (including novelettes and novellas), presenting stories from late 1925 to the end of 1929 in textually accurate form. Edited by S. T. Joshi. Includes an introduction, a comprehensive bibliography, and reviews written by Hammett for The Saturday Review of Literature during this period. ISBN 979-8-290303-93-2

=== Daily comic strips ===
- Secret Agent X-9 Book 1. David McKay Publications, 1934. Collection of the comic strip written by Hammett and illustrated by Alex Raymond.
- Secret Agent X-9 Book 2. David McKay Publications, 1934. A second collection of the comic strip.
- Secret Agent X-9. Nostalgia Press, NY, 1976.
- Dashiell Hammett's Secret Agent X-9. International Polygonics Ltd, 1983. ISBN 978-0-930330-05-7
- Secret Agent X-9. Kitchen Sink Press, 1990. ISBN 978-0-878160-77-8
- Secret Agent X-9. IDW Publishing, 2015. ISBN 978-1-631402-11-1. Collection of the comic strip written by Hammett and Leslie Charteris and illustrated by Alex Raymond.

== Adaptations ==
=== Film ===
- Roadhouse Nights, 1930 (adaptation of Red Harvest)
- The Maltese Falcon, 1931
- Woman in the Dark, 1934
- The Thin Man, 1934
- The Glass Key, 1935
- Satan Met a Lady, 1936 (adaptation of The Maltese Falcon)
- After the Thin Man, 1936
- Another Thin Man, 1939
- The Maltese Falcon, 1941
- The Glass Key, 1942
- No Good Deed, 2002 (adaptation of "The House in Turk Street")

==== Sequels based on characters created by Hammett ====
- Shadow of the Thin Man (1941)
- The Thin Man Goes Home (1945)
- Song of the Thin Man (1947)

==== Serial based on characters created by Hammett ====
- Secret Agent X-9, 1937, Universal Pictures
- Secret Agent X-9, 1945, Universal Pictures

==== Film based on characters created by Hammett ====
- The Fat Man, 1951, Universal Pictures

=== Radio ===
- The Thin Man, June 8, 1936, Lux Radio Theatre (with William Powell and Myrna Loy)
- The Glass Key, March 10, 1939, The Campbell Playhouse (with Orson Welles)
- After the Thin Man, June 17, 1940, Lux Radio Theatre (with William Powell and Myrna Loy)
- The Maltese Falcon, February 1, 1942, Silver Theater (with Humphrey Bogart)
- The Maltese Falcon, August 14, 1942, Philip Morris Playhouse (with Edward Arnold)
- The Maltese Falcon, February 8, 1943, Lux Radio Theatre (with Edward G. Robinson and Laird Cregar)
- The Maltese Falcon, September 20, 1943, The Screen Guild Theater (with Humphrey Bogart, Mary Astor, Sydney Greenstreet and Peter Lorre)
- The Maltese Falcon, July 3, 1946, Academy Award Theatre (with Humphrey Bogart, Mary Astor, and Sydney Greenstreet)
- The Glass Key, March 7, 1946, Hour of Mystery on ABC
- The Glass Key, July 22, 1946, The Screen Guild Theater (with Alan Ladd, Marjorie Reynolds, and Ward Bond)
- Two Sharp Knives, December 22, 1942, Suspense (with Stuart Erwin)
- Two Sharp Knives, June 7, 1945, Suspense (with John Payne and Frank McHugh)
- Dashiell Hammett – Secret Agent X-9, January 5, 1994, BBC Radio 5 (radio drama of Hammett's first Secret Agent X-9 script)

==== Series based on characters created by Hammett ====
- The Thin Man 1941, NBC; 1946, CBS; 1948, NBC; 1950, ABC
- The Adventures of Sam Spade 1946, CBS; 1949, NBC
- The Fat Man 1946–1950, ABC
- The Fat Man 1954–1955, Australian Broadcasting Corporation

=== Comic book ===
- The Maltese Falcon, 1946, Feature Book #48, David McKay Publications for King Features Syndicate (Hammett's original dialogue and art by Rodlow Willard)

=== Television ===
- Two Sharp Knives, 1949, Studio One on CBS (with Stanley Ridges and Abe Vigoda)
- The Thin Man, 1957–1959, MGM Television for NBC (with Peter Lawford and Phyllis Kirk)
- The Dain Curse, 1978, CBS (with James Coburn as the Continental Op)
- Fly Paper, 1995, Season 2 episode 7 of the TV anthology series Fallen Angels (with Christopher Lloyd as the Continental Op)
