= The Glass Key (1942 film) =

1942 film by Stuart Heisler

- Theatrical release poster
- Directed by: Stuart Heisler
- Screenplay by: Jonathan Latimer
- Based on: The Glass Key by Dashiell Hammett
- Produced by: Fred Kohlmar; Buddy G. DeSylva (uncredited)
- Starring: Brian Donlevy; Veronica Lake; Alan Ladd; William Bendix
- Cinematography: Theodor Sparkuhl
- Edited by: Archie Marshek
- Music by: Victor Young
- Production company: Paramount Pictures
- Distributed by: Paramount Pictures
- Release dates: October 14, 1942 (NYC); October 23, 1942 (US)
- Running time: 85 minutes
- Country: United States
- Language: English
- Box office: 700,704 admissions (France, 1949)

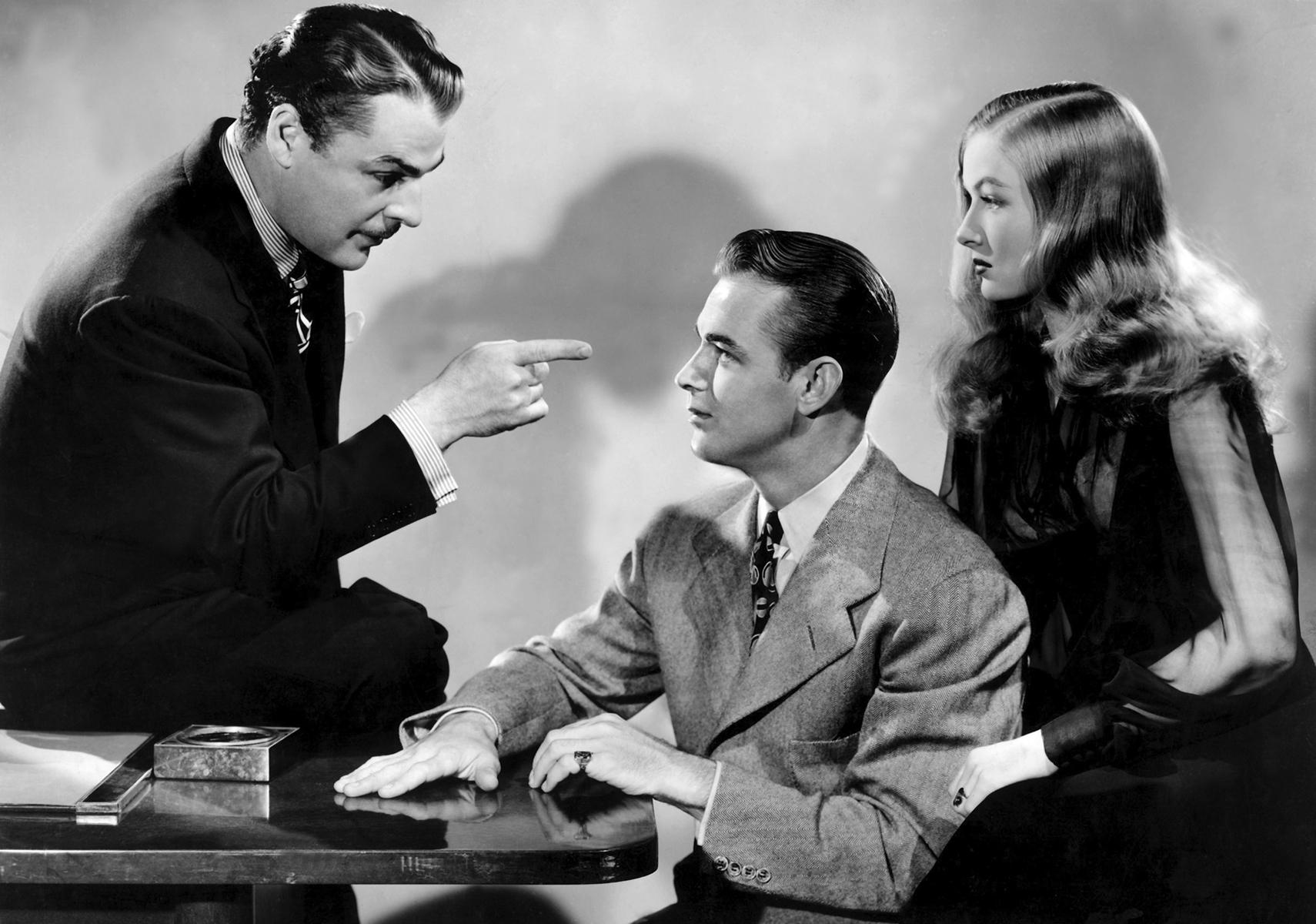
Brian Donlevy, Alan Ladd and Veronica Lake in The Glass Key

The Glass Key is a 1942 American film noir based on the 1931 novel of the same name by Dashiell Hammett. The picture was directed by Stuart Heisler starring Brian Donlevy, Veronica Lake and Alan Ladd (who plays the actual lead despite being billed third). A successful earlier film version starring George Raft in Ladd's role had been released in 1935. The 1942 version's supporting cast features William Bendix, Bonita Granville, Richard Denning and Joseph Calleia.

== Plot ==
After falling for Janet Henry, the daughter of reform candidate for governor Ralph Henry, shady political boss Paul Madvig is determined to help Henry get elected. Paul's right-hand man, Ed Beaumont, distrusts both Janet and her father, and suspects that they are stringing Paul along only to dump him after the election. Janet becomes engaged to Paul, but is put off by his crudity. She is attracted to the more sophisticated Ed, who fends off her advances out of loyalty to Paul. The deluded Paul boasts that Henry has practically given him the key to his house, but Ed warns him that it is liable to be a glass key, one that can break at any moment.

When Paul tells one of his supporters, the gangster Nick Varna, that he is cleaning up the city and that Varna will no longer receive protection from the police, Ed grows even more concerned. Complicating matters further, Ralph's ne'er-do-well son, Taylor, owes Nick for gambling debts, while Paul's young sister, Opal, is in love with Taylor. Paul has told her to stay away from Taylor, but she defies him. Opal becomes fearful about what Paul might do to Taylor.

Ed later finds Taylor's lifeless body in the street. Paul is the prime suspect, much to Nick's delight. When Nick hears that Ed and Paul have split over Taylor's death, he tries to recruit Ed. Ed turns him down, so Nick has him brutally beaten repeatedly by his sadistic henchman Jeff, to force him into revealing details of Paul's corruption to the editor of the newspaper Nick controls. Ed contrives an escape and is hospitalized. When he recovers, he learns that Nick has found a "witness" to Taylor Henry's killing, Henry Sloss. Paul has Sloss brought to his office, but he is gunned down before he can talk. As a result, Paul is indicted for the murder and jailed.

Ed finds a somewhat drunk Jeff in a bar and tries to pump the thug for information. Just as Jeff starts to talk, Nick shows up and brusquely orders him to shut up. When Ed disarms Nick, a fed-up Jeff strangles his boss. Afterwards, Ed has the waiter call the police to arrest Jeff. Having finally guessed who killed Taylor, Ed persuades District Attorney Farr to arrest Janet. As Ed had hoped, Ralph confesses he struggled with Taylor, causing him to fall and strike his head. Paul overhears Janet tell Ed that she loves him and that she knows he loves her. Paul gives the couple his blessing, but takes back his expensive engagement ring.

== Cast ==
- Brian Donlevy as Paul Madvig
- Veronica Lake as Janet Henry
- Alan Ladd as Ed Beaumont
- Bonita Granville as Opal "Snip" Madvig
- Richard Denning as Taylor Henry
- Joseph Calleia as Nick Varna
- William Bendix as Jeff
- Frances Gifford as Nurse
- Donald MacBride as District Attorney Farr
- Margaret Hayes as Eloise Matthews
- Moroni Olsen as Ralph Henry
- Eddie Marr as Rusty
- Arthur Loft as Clyde Matthews
- George Meader as Claude Tuttle

Uncredited

- Norma Varden as dinner guest
- Bess Flowers as dinner guest
- Dane Clark as Henry Sloss
- Vernon Dent as bartender serving beers at table
- Tom Fadden as waiter
- Lillian Randolph as singer at basement club

Cast notes:

- This was the second of four films teaming Veronica Lake and Alan Ladd, the others being: This Gun for Hire (1942); The Blue Dahlia (1946); and Saigon (1948). The two also appeared as themselves in the all-star films Star Spangled Rhythm (1942), Duffy's Tavern (1945), and Variety Girl (1947), but did not share any scenes together.
- Alan Ladd portrays the lead character, but received third billing because his career as a leading man had begun so recently compared to Donlevy and Lake.

== Production ==
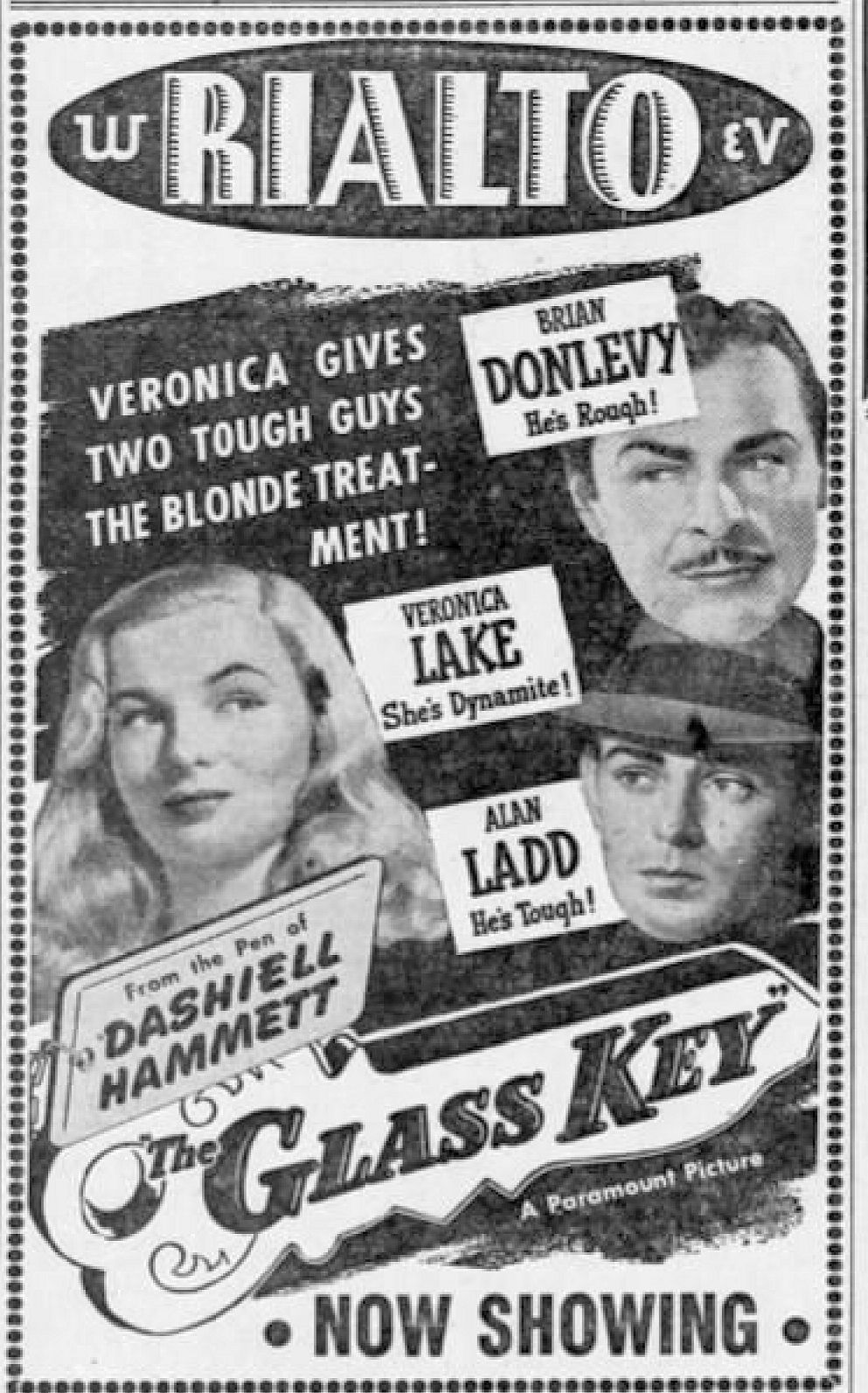
1942 newspaper ad

Dashiell Hammett's The Glass Key had been filmed by Paramount in 1935 as a vehicle for George Raft. They still retained the film rights in 1941, when Alan Ladd impressed Paramount executives while shooting This Gun for Hire. Even before the film was released, head of production Buddy de Sylva announced the studio would star Ladd in his own film as a follow-up. Hammett's reputation had become extremely strong again in Hollywood following the success of the 1941 smash hit version of his novel The Maltese Falcon starring Humphrey Bogart and Mary Astor, and Paramount decided on a new version of The Glass Key; De Sylva said the studio wanted a "sure-fire narrative to help him [Ladd] on his way".

Production was announced in October 1941. Two months later Paramount said that Ladd would make Red Harvest, from another Hammett novel, instead of The Glass Key, with Jonathan Latimer to write the script and Fred Kohlmar to produce. Brian Donlevy was assigned to co-star.

However, these plans changed again—Red Harvest was postponed (it was never made) and The Glass Key was re-activated, with Donlevy and Ladd to star. Stuart Heisler was assigned to direct.

Paulette Goddard was originally cast as the female lead but had to drop out due to another commitment. She was replaced at first with Patricia Morison, but after seeing Lake and Ladd together in This Gun for Hire it was decided to replace Morison with Veronica Lake. Lake was going to be making I Married a Witch but that project was postponed when Joel McCrea turned down the lead role; the picture was eventually filmed with Fredric March and Lake.

Bonita Granville, Richard Denning and Joseph Calleia were assigned supporting roles. Old time movie stars Maurice Costello, Jack Mulhall and Pat O'Malley played minor roles. Unbilled Dane Clark (as "Sloss"), Laraine Day (as a nurse), Lillian Randolph and Vernon Dent also briefly appear in the film.

== Reception ==
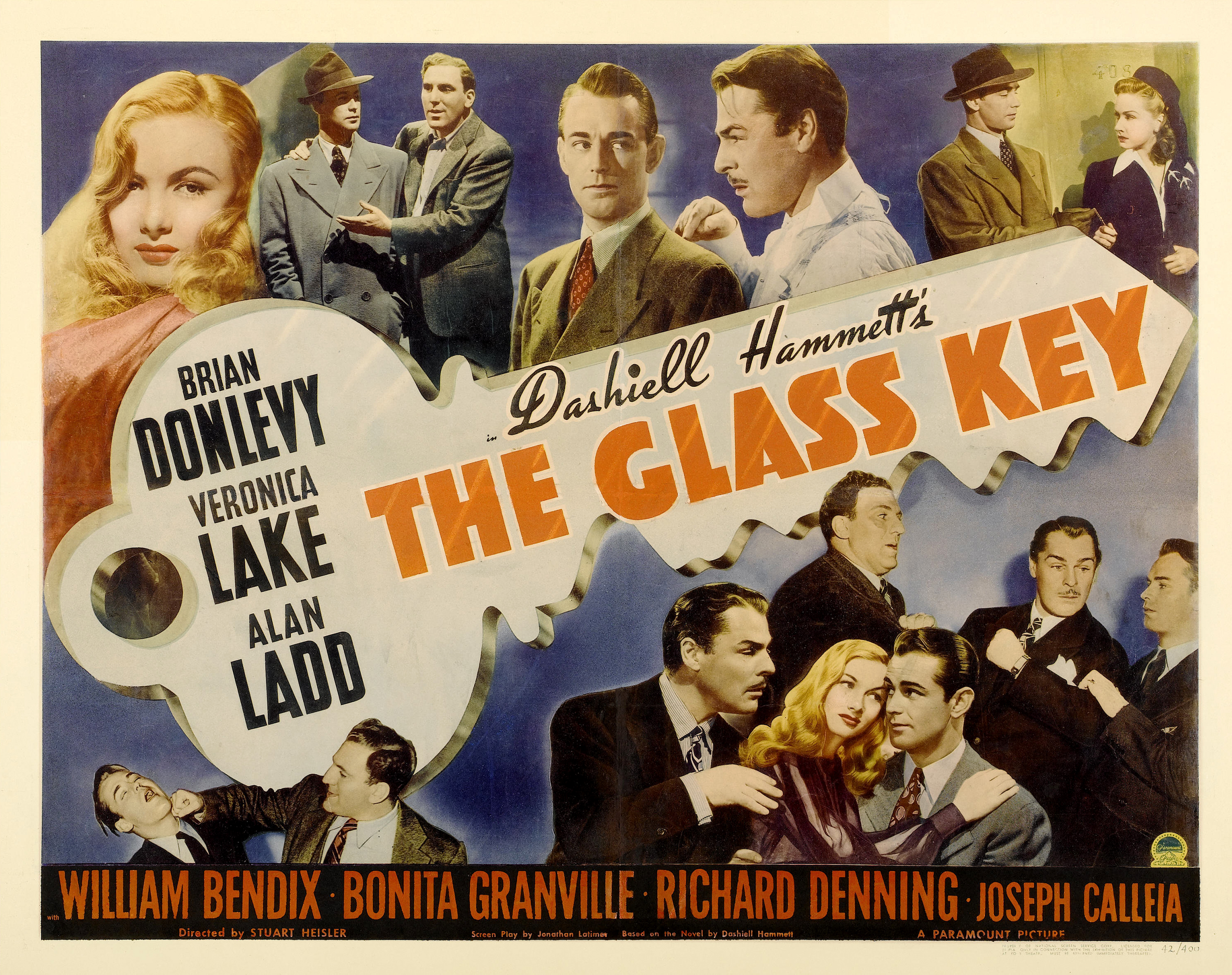
Theatrical release window card

Contemporary reviews

On the film's release, Variety magazine gave the film a favorable review: "Parading a murder mystery amidst background of politics, gambling czars, romance and lusty action, this revised version of Dashiell Hammett's novel—originally made in 1935—is a good picture of its type...Mixed well, the result is an entertaining whodunit with sufficient political and racketeer angles to make it good entertainment for general audiences. Donlevy makes the most of his role of the political leader who fought his way up from the other side of the tracks."

Retrospective reviews

In a retrospective review, critic Dennis Schwartz wrote, "The film is mostly done for entertainment purposes, as it lightly skips over the corrupt political process as merely background for the unlikely love story developing between the engaging Lake and the deadpan Ladd. The film had many undeveloped film noir themes used by other films. Howard Hawks's The Big Sleep borrowed freely from The Glass Key."

In his retrospective review for AllMovie, critic Hal Erickson wrote: "Dashiel Hammett's The Glass Key, a tale of big-city political corruption, was first filmed in 1935, with Edward Arnold as a duplicitous political boss and George Raft as his loyal lieutenant. This 1942 remake improves on the original, especially in replacing the stolid Raft with the charismatic Alan Ladd...Far less complex than the Dashiel Hammett original (and far less damning of the American political system), The Glass Key further increased the box-office pull of Paramount's new team of Alan Ladd and Veronica Lake."

In 2020, Diabolique called it a "superb film noir, achingly gorgeous to look at, and less weighed down by patriotism than This Gun for Hire. Lake is clearly inexperienced but is so beautiful and enigmatic you overlook her flaws, and she once again teams marvelously with Ladd – two blonde shorties, full of mutual smirking/contempt/admiration. The core of the film is a platonic love story between Ladd and Brian Donlevy – but these actors don’t have chemistry; Ladd and Lake do."
