= The Glass Key (1935 film) =

1935 film by Frank Tuttle

- Theatrical release poster
- Directed by: Frank Tuttle
- Written by: Kathryn Scola; Kubec Glasmon (screenplay); Harry Ruskin (additional dialogue)
- Based on: The Glass Key; 1931 novel by Dashiell Hammett
- Produced by: E. Lloyd Sheldon
- Starring: George Raft; Edward Arnold; Claire Dodd; Guinn "Big Boy" Williams; Ray Milland
- Cinematography: Henry Sharp
- Edited by: Hugh Bennett
- Production company: Paramount Pictures
- Distributed by: Paramount Pictures
- Release date: June 15, 1935
- Running time: 80 minutes
- Country: United States
- Language: English

The Glass Key is a 1935 American crime drama film directed by Frank Tuttle starring George Raft, Edward Arnold, Claire Dodd, Guinn "Big Boy" Williams and Ray Milland. Ann Sheridan has a brief speaking role as Raft's character's nurse in their first film together. Produced and distributed by Paramount Pictures, it was based upon the 1931 suspense novel The Glass Key by Dashiell Hammett,

The film was remade in 1942, with Alan Ladd in Raft's role, Brian Donlevy and Veronica Lake in the roles previously played by Arnold and Dodd, and William Bendix in Guinn Williams's part.

== Plot ==
Paul Madvig (Edward Arnold) controls crime and politics in the city, helped by the brains and brawn of Ed Beaumont (George Raft). As he throws his support behind Janet Henry's (Claire Dodd) father, in a political campaign, Paul also plans to marry her.

Janet's brother Taylor (Ray Milland) is a gambler heavily in debt to O'Rory (Robert Gleckler), a gangster whose club Paul intends to put out of business. Taylor, who has been romancing Paul's daughter Opal (Rosalind Keith), is found dead. The temperamental Paul falls under suspicion.

Ed pretends to betray Paul while offering to work for O'Rory's organization. He is beaten by Jeff (Guinn Williams), a brutal thug who works for O'Rory, and has to flee for his life.

Paul is going to face murder charges, but Janet's father knows who is really behind her brother's death. It's up to Ed to get him to reveal the truth.

== Cast ==
- George Raft as Ed Beaumont
- Edward Arnold as Paul Madvig
- Claire Dodd as Janet Henry
- Rosalind Keith as Opal Madvig
- Charles Richman as Senator John T. Henry
- Robert Gleckler as Shad O'Rory
- Guinn Williams as Jeff
- Ray Milland as Taylor Henry
- Tammany Young as Clarkie
- Emma Dunn as Mom Madvig
- Charles C. Wilson as District Attorney Edward J. Farr
- Mack Gray as Duke
- Ann Sheridan as Nurse
- George Reed as Midnight (uncredited)

== Production ==
In September 1930, Paramount paid $25,000 for the film rights to the novel when it was in galleys. The following year Paramount announced Gary Cooper would star in a version called Graft but it was not made.

In August 1934, Paramount announced Frank Tuttle would direct George Raft in an adaptation of The Glass Key.

Elissa Landi was once announced for the female lead before being replaced by Claire Dodd. Filming started on 25 February 1935.

Ann Sheridan was billed as "Nurse" at the bottom of the cast list at the end of the film for her brief speaking role with Raft.

== Reception ==
Writing for The Spectator, Graham Greene described the film as "unimaginatively gangster" and grouped it with the contemporary comedy No More Ladies to describe both as "second rate" and "transient". Nevertheless, the film became one of Raft's biggest box-office hits of the 1930s.
