= Clash by Night (play) =

Play written by Clifford Odets

Kim Stanley as Mae D'Amato in the June 13, 1957 Playhouse 90 production of Clifford Odets' Clash by Night, directed by John Frankenheimer. She returned to Playhouse 90 three years later (March 7, 1960) to portray Sarah Eubanks in Horton Foote's adaptation of William Faulkner's Tomorrow, directed by Robert Mulligan.

Clash by Night is a romantic triangle drama by Clifford Odets which premiered on Broadway in 1941 and was later adapted to film and television. The title derives from Matthew Arnold's poem "Dover Beach" (1867):

Ah, love, let us be true
To one another! for the world, which seems
To lie before us like a land of dreams,
So various, so beautiful, so new,
Hath really neither joy, nor love, nor light,
Nor certitude, nor peace, nor help for pain;
And we are here as on a darkling plain
Swept with confused alarms of struggle and flight,
Where ignorant armies clash by night.

== Broadway ==
The title carried a certain irony when Odets' play, produced by Billy Rose, debuted on Broadway at the Belasco Theatre three weeks after the Pearl Harbor attack. Directed by Lee Strasberg, the production opened December 27, 1941 and ran for a total of 49 performances before closing on February 7, 1942.

Tallulah Bankhead and Lee J. Cobb headed the cast as Mae and Jerry Wilenski with Katherine Locke as Peggy Coffey and Joseph Schildkraut as Earl Pfeiffer. Boris Aronson designed the setting of the Wilenski home on Staten Island in the summer of 1941. While Robert Ryan was acting in a 1941 summer stock production of A Kiss for Cinderella with actress Luise Rainer, he was seen by Odets (Rainer's ex-husband), who offered him the juvenile role of Joe Doyle in Clash by Night. Others in the cast were Seth Arnold, Ralph Chambers, Stephan Eugene Cole, Harold Grau, John F. Hamilton, William Nunn, Joseph Shattuck and Art Smith.

Despite the short run on Broadway, the play was published by Random House in 1942.

== Film ==
When the play was adapted to film a decade later by screenwriter Alfred Hayes, the setting was changed from Staten Island to Monterey, California, and the character names were altered from Wilenski to D'Amato. Fritz Lang directed the 1952 black-and-white film noir/drama, Clash by Night, starring Barbara Stanwyck, Paul Douglas, Marilyn Monroe and Robert Ryan. By this time, Ryan had outgrown the juvenile role of Joe Doyle and instead co-starred as Earl Pfeiffer, the role Joseph Schildkraut created on Broadway. In the film's storyline, Mae Doyle (Stanwyck) returns to her home in a small town and a love triangle develops between Mae, fisherman Jerry D'Amato (Douglas) and film projectionist Earl Pfeiffer (Ryan), even after Mae and Jerry are married and have a baby. A subplot covers the blossoming romance between Peggy (Monroe) and Joe Doyle (Keith Andes). Others in the cast included Silvio Minciotti as Papa D'Amato and J. Carrol Naish as Uncle Vince.

== Television ==
Five years after the movie, the Odets play was adapted for television. John Frankenheimer directed the Playhouse 90 production, telecast live June 13, 1957 on CBS with Kim Stanley in the lead role of Mae D'Amato, E. G. Marshall as Jerry D'Amato and Lloyd Bridges as Earl Pfeiffer. Also in the cast were John Bleifer and Edgar Stehli.

== Current ==
Clash by Night is still performed today. John Mossman directed a revival in 2006 at Chicago's The Artistic Home that brought rave reviews, including Time Out:

The latest of Artistic Home's resurrections of great writers' assumed-dead works, Mossman's razor-sharp production slices open Odet's hard-boiled poem of the people. What's revealed is utterly devastating.

An earlier revival was by John McCormack's All Seasons Theater Group, a 1998 production with actress Jodie Markell. Peter Marks reviewed in The New York Times:

Clash by Night is best known as a flaccid 1952 B movie, directed by Fritz Lang and starring Barbara Stanwyck, that chronicles Mae's anguish in her marriage to a simple, hard-working guy, and her subsequent affair with a complicated, drifting layabout. The filmmaker tried to inject some energy by transplanting the story to California (and, for some reason, the fishing industry) and tacking on a happy ending. (In the play, Mae's affair comes to a violent end; in the movie, she ends the affair and goes back to her bland but loving husband.) The revival, directed by Richard Caliban, returns the play to its more credible roots, Staten Island just before the American entry into World War II. Mr. Caliban understands that this is, more than anything else, a period piece, the period marking the growing power and prominence of the blue-collar class. The director immerses us in a specific time and place; the evening begins with a young couple performing, in reverse chronological order, the dance crazes and musical styles of the last half of the 20th century, until they arrive in the summer of 1941 on Mae and Jerry's suitably ramshackle porch, designed by George Xenos. Still, even with global war looming, Odets and Ms. Markell can make it seem as if the only significant problem in the world is Mae's paralyzing depression. Because some of the other actors are not playing at Ms. Markell's level, the focus on Mae's hollowed-out life is all the more intense. Some of the best moments in Clash by Night, in fact, occur as Ms. Markell stands on the porch, a remote figure commenting on the folly of her existence.

== Titles ==
The Matthew Arnold poem has been a source for numerous titles, including Norman Mailer's The Armies of the Night and Clifford Irving's On a Darkling Plain. The 1964 British film Clash by Night is a different story, not based on Odets' play.
