= Paraluman =

Filipino actress (1923–2009)

- Paraluman in 1956
- Born: Sigrid Sophia Agatha de Torres von Giese; December 14, 1923; Tayabas, Philippine Islands (now Tayabas City, Quezon, Philippines)
- Died: April 27, 2009 (aged 85); Parañaque, Metro Manila, Philippines
- Resting place: Manila South Cemetery, Makati, Metro Manila, Philippines
- Occupations: Actress model
- Years active: 1940–1985
- Spouse(s): Brigido Sibug; Tony O’Brien; Yoshifume Abe
- Children: 1

Paraluman (born Sigrid Sophia Agatha de Torres von Giese; December 14, 1923 – April 27, 2009), was a Filipino actress whose career spanned four decades. Dubbed as "the Greta Garbo of the Philippines," she is often cited as one of the greatest screen figures in the country.

She first appeared in the film Flores de Mayo (1940) and rose to fame in the self-titled film opposite Fernando Poe Sr. She has since appeared in over 90 motion pictures including several foreign films such as Elephant Girl (1951) and Surrender - Hell! (1959). Paraluman has received two FAMAS Awards and has been inducted at the Eastwood City Walk of Fame.

== Early life ==
Paraluman was born Sigrid Sophia Agatha de Torres von Giese in Tayabas to Lothar Hans von Giese and Tecla de Torres. Her father emigrated to the Philippines from Hamburg, Germany, and her mother was a native of Tayabas.

Educated at Assumption College, the young Paraluman herself was an avid movie fan. She loved reading magazines about her favorite celebrities. Her interest in showbiz increased when she learnt that their next-door neighbour was the actress Corazón Noble, and she would often climb their fence to catch glimpse of the actress. Her curiosity yielded positive results because Noble's younger sister, Lily, noticed her and they soon became friends.

== Career ==
Her extraordinary beauty led the seventeen-year-old Paraluman to be recommended by another sister of Corazón Noble, Norma, to film producer Luis Nolasco. Her first movie was Flores de Mayo (1940), and she initially used the screen name Mina de Gracia. She was rechristened "Paraluman" (archaic Tagalog for "muse" or "magnetic needle") by Fernando Poe, Sr., who signed her as a full-fledged star in X’otic Films' Paraluman (1941). This was followed by the actresses' roles in the films Bayani ng Bayan and Puting Dambana.

After World War II, she came back to cinema as a contract star of Sampaguita Pictures. She then became a famous leading lady in romantic movies, but when she made a comeback, her image was repackaged by Sampaguita Pictures owner Dr. José "Doc" Pérez. She was given character roles, playing nemesis to Gloria Romero in Hongkong Holiday, then as a disabled woman in Tanikaláng Apoy (1959). She won a FAMAS Best Actress Award for her role in Sino ang Maysala?

Paraluman was also nominated by FAMAS four times: twice in 1959 for Best Actress for the movies Bobby and Anino ni Bathala, in 1972 as Best Supporting Actress for Lilet, and in 1976 as Best Supporting Actress for Mister Mo, Lover Boy Ko. Her last films were Viva Films' Kailan Sasabihing Mahal Kita in 1985, NV Productions' "Tatlong Ina, isang Anak" in 1987 as one of the spinster aunts of Miguel Rodríguez, and Seiko Films' Isusumbong Kita sa Diyos in 1988.

== Personal life ==
Paraluman's first marriage was to Yoshifume Abe, which ended in divorce. She remarried in December 1949 in Manila to airline pilot Anthony Joseph "Tony" Barretto O'Brien, the son of Peter O'Brien and Dolores Barretto y Barretto of Zambales. Baby O'Brien, her daughter from her first marriage to Abe, took her stepfather's surname and was herself a television actress and advertising model. O'Brien's daughter, Rina Reyes, is also an actress. Paraluman's great-granddaughter and Reyes's daughter, Sophie Reyes, is also an actress under Star Magic Batch 2019.

=== Death ===
Paraluman died of cardiac arrest from Alzheimer’s and Parkinson’s diseases complications on 27 April 2009 at her home in Parañaque. She was 85 years old.

== Filmography ==
Paraluman's film credits
Year	Title	Role	Notes	Ref(s)
1940	Flores de Mayo	Mina de Gracia		
1941	Paraluman			
1941	Palaris			
1941	Bayani ng Buhay			
1941	Puting Dambana			
1941	Manilena			
1947	La Paloma			
1947	Ina			
1948	Amapola			
1948	Sor Remedios			
1948	Awit ng Bulag			
1949	Good Morning Professor			
1949	Biro ng Tadhana			
1949	Kaputol ng Isang Awit			
1949	Pinaghating Isangdaan			
1950	Batong Buhay			
1950	Sinag sa Kalbario			
1950	Dalawang Bandila			
1953	Now and Forever			
1953	Highway 54			
1953	May Karapatang Isilang			
1954	Sarawak			
1954	Pusong Ginto			
1955	Sintu-Sinto			
1956	Lydia			
1956	Babalu			
1956	Rodora	Clara/Rosa		
1956	Gigolo			
1957	Hongkong Holiday			
1957	Veronica	Veronica		
1957	Sonata			
1957	Taga sa Bato			
1957	Sino ang Maysala?			
1958	Anino ni Bathala	Dolores		
1958	Ulilang Anghel			
1958	Tatang Edyer			
1958	Bobby			
1958	Elephant Girl			
1959	Ipinagbili Ko Ang Aking Anak			
1959	Pitong Pagsisisi			
1959	Tanikalang Apoy			
1959	Kahapon Lamang			
1959	Surrender - Hell!	Pilar		
1959	Baby Face			
1959	Rosana Rossini			
1959	Kamandag			
1960	Isinakdal Ko Mag Aking Ama			
1960	Kuwintas ng Alaala			
1960	Amy, Susie & Tessie			
1960	Estrela Mondragon			
1960	Limang Misteryo ng Krus			
1961	5 Yugto ng Buhay			
1961	Dalawang Kalbaryo ni Dr. Mendez			
1961	Harangan Man ng Sibat			
1961	Makasalanang Daigdig			
1961	Sa Linggo ng Bola			
1962	The Big Broadcast			
1962	Magbayad ang May-utang			
1962	Ako ang Katarungan			
1962	Pitong Puso			
1962	Pitong Makasalanan			
1963	Pitong Kabanalan ng Isang Makasalanan			
1963	Tagumpay ng Langit			
1963	Ang Class Reunion	Ms. Dimalanta		
1963	Pedring Arenas, Alyas Ice Pick			
1964	Moro Witch Doctor	Selisa Noble		
1965	Isinulat sa Dugo			
1966	Bakit Pa Ako Isinilang?			
1966	Ang Tao ay Makasalanan			
1966	Nais Ko Pang Mabuhay			
1967	Dahil sa Isang Bulaklak	Victoria		
1969	Stoney	Margaret Suwono		
1970	The Losers	Mama-San		
1971	Lilet	Amanda		
1972	Daughters of Satan	Juana Rios		
1973	Super Gee			
1975	Mister Mo, Lover Boy Ko			
1975	Dugo at Pag-ibig sa Kapirasong Lupa	Vicente's wife		
1975	Mother and Daughter			
1975	Alat			
1976	Nahirit, Nasipol Ang Biyaheng Bikol			
1976	Malikot na Mata Maraming Nakikita			
1976	Malamig, Mainit ang Magdamag			
1976	Ikaw... Ako Laban sa Mundo!			
1977	Pulot-gata: Puwede Kaya?			
1977	The Lineman			
1978	Ligaya Mo ay Kasawian ko			
1979	Bakit May Pag-ibig Pa?			
1985	Hello Lover, Goodbye Friend	Rita Delgado-Smith		
1985	Kailan Sasabihing Mahal Kita	Luz Tuazon		

== Legacy ==
- Filipino rock band The Eraserheads mentioned her in the opening lyrics of Ang Huling El Bimbo.
- She is also mentioned in the lyrics of the songs Binibini by Filipino pop group The Rainmakers
- The song Paraluman by Filipino singer and model Adie is about a woman whose beauty is like hers.
- A Filipino rock band, Paraluman, is also named after the late actress.
- Ahtisa Manalo paid tribute to Paraluman with glamorous curls in her latest sepia-colored photo shoot.

== Accolades ==
Awards and nominations received by Paraluman
Organizations	Year	Recipient	Category	Result	Ref.
FAMAS Awards	1958	Sino ang Maysala?	Best Actress	Won	
FAMAS Awards	1959	Bobby	Best Actress	Nominated	
FAMAS Awards	1959	Anino ni Bathala	Best Actress	Nominated	
FAMAS Awards	1966	Isinulat sa Dugo	Best Actress	Nominated	
FAMAS Awards	1972	Lilet	Best Supporting Actress	Nominated	
FAMAS Awards	1976	Mister Mo, Lover Boy Ko	Best Supporting Actress	Nominated	
FAMAS Awards	2008	Paraluman	Lifetime Achievement Award	Honored	
