= Robert Ryan =

American actor (1909–1973)

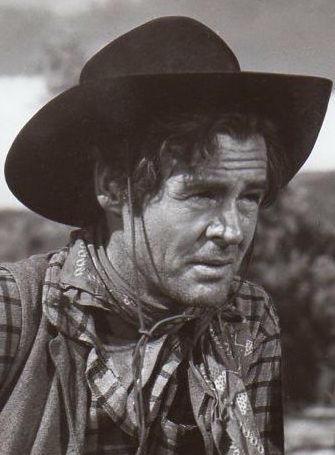
- Ryan in The Naked Spur (1953)
- Born: Robert Bushnell Ryan; November 11, 1909; Chicago, Illinois, U.S.
- Died: July 11, 1973 (aged 63); New York City, New York, U.S.
- Education: Loyola Academy, Dartmouth College (B.A., 1932)
- Occupations: Actor; activist
- Years active: 1940–1973
- Spouse: Jessica Cadwalader (m. 1939; died 1972)
- Children: Three
- Awards: See below

Robert Bushnell Ryan (November 11, 1909 – July 11, 1973) was an American actor and activist. He became known for his roles in films noir and Westerns, gaining fame for his portrayals of both hardened anti-heroes and ruthless villains. He was nominated for an Academy Award for Best Supporting Actor for his role in Crossfire (1947), and a BAFTA Award for his performance in Billy Budd (1962). He was also an accomplished stage actor, winning a Drama Desk Award for a 1971 revival of Long Day's Journey into Night.

Though he never achieved the A-list stardom of some of his Hollywood peers, Ryan nonetheless remained a popular performer, well-regarded by both critics and his peers. Critic Manohla Dargis wrote, "[Ryan] was the type of next-level star and B-movie stalwart that helped make old Hollywood great" and "born to play beautifully tortured, angry souls."

== Early years ==
Ryan was born in Chicago, the first child of Mabel Arbutus (née Bushnell), a secretary, and Timothy Aloysius Ryan, who was from a wealthy family who owned a real estate firm. He was of Irish (his paternal grandparents were from Thurles) and English descent. Ryan was raised Catholic and educated at Loyola Academy.

Ryan graduated from Dartmouth College in 1932, where he held the school's heavyweight boxing title for all four years of his attendance, along with lettering in football and track. After graduation, Ryan found employment as a stoker on a ship that traveled to Africa, a WPA worker, a ranch hand in Montana, and other odd jobs.

Ryan returned home in 1936 when his father died; after a brief stint modeling clothes for a department store, he decided to become an actor.

== Career ==
=== Early appearances ===
In 1937 Ryan joined a little theater group in Chicago. The following year he enrolled in the Max Reinhardt Workshop in Hollywood. His role in the 1939 play Too Many Husbands brought an offer from Paramount. Although he had done a screen test for them in 1938 and been turned down as "not the right type", the studio offered him a $75 a week contract.

=== Paramount ===
In November 1939, Paramount signed Ryan to a six-month contract and announced he would play the lead in Golden Gloves (1940), citing his boxing experience at Dartmouth. However, after a screen test with Gloves director Edward Dmytryk, the lead went to Richard Denning and Ryan was cast in a minor, but important role as a boxing "ringer". He had his first credited role, while making a lasting association with the director in which they would make several films together.

In the same year, Ryan had small parts in The Ghost Breakers (1940) and Queen of the Mob (1940) as well as small roles in North West Mounted Police (1941) and Texas Rangers Ride Again (1941). Then Paramount dropped him.

He went to Broadway, where he was cast in a production of Clifford Odets' Clash by Night (1941–42), directed by Lee Strasberg and produced by Billy Rose starring Tallulah Bankhead and Lee J. Cobb. It had a run of 49 performances, but was high-profile and led to his being signed to a long-term contract by RKO.

=== RKO ===
Ryan appeared in Bombardier (1943), starring Pat O'Brien, and was fourth-billed in the Fred Astaire musical The Sky's the Limit (1943), playing a friend of Astaire. Both films were popular.

He was fourth-billed in Behind the Rising Sun (1943), directed by Edward Dmytryk, which was a huge box-office success then third-billed in The Iron Major (1943), with O'Brien, and Gangway for Tomorrow (1943).

RKO promoted him to star status in Tender Comrade (1943), where he was Ginger Rogers' leading man, directed for the third time by Dmytryk. It was a big hit. Also popular was Marine Raiders (1944), in which Ryan co-starred again alongside O'Brien.

=== World War II ===
Ryan enlisted in the United States Marine Corps and served as a drill instructor from January 1944 to November 1945 at Camp Pendleton, in Southern California. There he befriended a fellow Marine, the writer and future film director Richard Brooks. He also took up painting.

=== Return to acting ===
When Ryan was discharged from the Marine Corps, he returned to RKO. They immediately cast Ryan in the Randolph Scott western, Trail Street (1947), which was very popular. However, his next film made with Joan Bennett, The Woman on the Beach (1947) directed by Jean Renoir, lost money.

Ryan's breakthrough role was as an anti-Semitic killer in the Dmytryk-directed film noir Crossfire (1947), co-starring Robert Young, Robert Mitchum, and Gloria Grahame. The film was based on Richard Brooks's novel The Brick Foxhole, which reflected the tensions of barracks life during the war—something familiar to both Brooks and Ryan from their Pendleton experience. Crossfire was highly successful at the box office and received several Academy Award nominations including a Best Supporting Actor for Ryan's performance.

Ryan co-starred with Merle Oberon in Berlin Express (1948) for director Jacques Tourneur. He was reunited with Scott in Return of the Bad Men (1948), and with O'Brien in The Boy with Green Hair (1948). The latter film was directed by Joseph Losey and produced by Dore Schary, who was head of production at RKO.

MGM borrowed him to make Act of Violence (1948) for Fred Zinnemann. He stayed at that studio to make Caught (1949) for Max Ophuls with James Mason.

Back at RKO, Ryan had one of his best roles in The Set-Up (1949), directed by Robert Wise, as an over-the-hill boxer who is brutally punished for refusing to take a dive. The Set-Up was a favorite of Ryan's. He was top billed in The Woman on Pier 13 (1949), an anti-communist melodrama directed by Robert Stevenson, that was made at the prompting of RKO's new owner, Howard Hughes.

Ryan next appeared in several film noirs: The Secret Fury (1950) with Claudette Colbert directed by Mel Ferrer, and Born to Be Bad (1950) directed by Nicholas Ray. In 1950, the studio bought The Miami Story as a vehicle for him.

He then made the Western Best of the Badmen (1951), and costarred with John Wayne in Flying Leathernecks (1951), a World War II film directed by Ray. It was announced he was working on an original film story called The Alpine Slide about avalanches, but no film resulted.

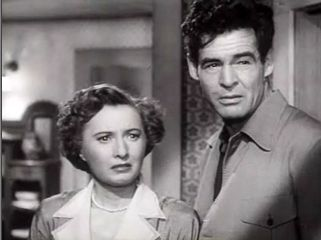
With Barbara Stanwyck in Clash by Night (1952)

In 1951, Ryan was reunited with Crossfire costar Robert Mitchum in The Racket, directed by John Cromwell; that same year, Ray again directed him in a film noir, On Dangerous Ground, with Ida Lupino. Ryan then made the film adaptation of Clash by Night (1952) with Barbara Stanwyck and Marilyn Monroe under Fritz Lang's direction. According to film critic David Thomson, "at RKO Ryan created the character of a modern neurotic such as the American screen had not dreamed of before."

His last film at RKO for a number of years was Beware, My Lovely (1952) with Lupino, made for her production company.

=== Post-RKO ===
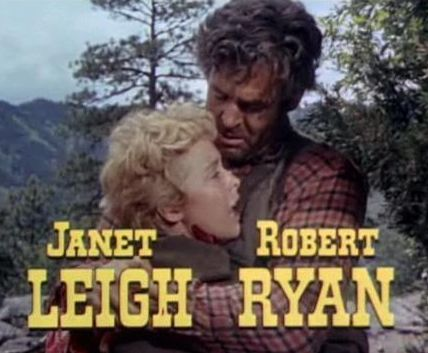
The Naked Spur (1953)

Ryan went to MGM where he played a villain in Anthony Mann's western The Naked Spur (1953), starring James Stewart. The picture was very popular.

He appeared in City Beneath the Sea (1953) for Budd Boetticher at Universal, Inferno (1953) at Fox, and Alaska Seas (1954) at Paramount.

He was the leading man for Shirley Booth in About Mrs. Leslie (1954) and Greer Garson in Her Twelve Men (1954). The latter was made at MGM, now being run by Dore Schary, RKO's previous studio head, who cast Ryan as the head villain in Bad Day at Black Rock (1954).

He appeared in an off-Broadway production of Coriolanus (1954) directed by John Houseman.

Ryan returned to RKO for Escape to Burma (1955) with Stanwyck. More widely seen was Sam Fuller's House of Bamboo (1955) and Raoul Walsh's The Tall Men (1955), both at Fox. By now his fee was reported as $150,000 per film.

He starred in The Proud Ones (1956) at Fox, Back from Eternity (1956) at RKO, directed by John Farrow. He appeared in Men in War (1957) for Anthony Mann, made at Mann's company Security Pictures.

=== Television ===
Ryan made his television debut in 1955 as Abraham Lincoln in the Screen Director's Playhouse adaptation of Christopher Morley's story "Lincoln's Doctor's Dog." As he explained to reporters, despite financial considerations, Ryan preferred to steer clear of any commitment to a TV series:

The only money in TV is in the series, and I want to stay out of those. Sure, I might make a million or so in a series, but I'd wind up being 'Sidewinder Sam' for the rest of my life.

Ryan remained true to these convictions, appearing in many television series, but always as a guest star. He was in Screen Directors Playhouse, Mr. Adams and Eve, Goodyear Theatre, Alcoa Theatre, Playhouse 90 (playing The Great Gatsby), and Zane Grey Theater.

He continued to star in features, however, including God's Little Acre (1958) for Mann and Security Pictures, Lonelyhearts (1959) written and produced by Schary, Day of the Outlaw (1959) for Security Pictures, and Odds Against Tomorrow (1959) for Wise.

=== 1960s ===
In the summer of 1960 Ryan starred opposite Katharine Hepburn at the American Shakespeare Theatre in Stratford, Connecticut, playing Antony to Hepburn's Cleopatra.

Ryan remained in high demand throughout the 1960s: he appeared in Ice Palace (1960) with Richard Burton; a TV version of The Snows of Kilimanjaro directed by John Frankenheimer; The Canadians (1961) for Burt Kennedy; played John the Baptist in MGM's Technicolor epic King of Kings (1961) for Nicholas Ray; was the villainous Claggart in Peter Ustinov's adaptation of Billy Budd (1962) for which he was nominated for a BAFTA.

He also appeared in the all-star war film The Longest Day (1962), playing James M. Gavin.

Ryan returned to Broadway in the musical Mr. President (1962–63) by Lindsay and Crouse with music by Irving Berlin and directed by Joshua Logan; it ran for 263 performances.

Ryan continued to appear in TV shows such as Kraft Suspense Theatre, Breaking Point, The Eleventh Hour, Wagon Train, The Reporter and Bob Hope Presents the Chrysler Theatre. Ryan's only partial concession to featuring in an entire television series was his role as Narrator in CBS's 26-episode acclaimed documentary homage to World War One, released in prime-time during the 1964–65 season.

Ryan was considered for a role in Gene Roddenberry's Star Trek. Norman Spinrad had written the script of the 1967 episode "The Doomsday Machine" with Ryan in mind to play Commodore Matt Decker, but Ryan had prior commitments. That role went to William Windom.

=== Europe ===
Ryan could be seen in The Crooked Road (1965) and The Secret Agents (1965), then the all-star Battle of the Bulge (1965) for Phil Yordan and The Professionals (1966) for Brooks.

Ryan supported Sid Caesar in The Busy Body (1967) and had a key supporting part in The Dirty Dozen (1967) for Robert Aldrich and Hour of the Gun (1967), playing Ike Clanton for John Sturges.

Ryan played Othello (1967) in a regional production at Nottingham, England.

Ryan went to Europe for A Minute to Pray, A Second to Die (1968) and Anzio (1969) for Dmytryk. Ryan had the lead in Captain Nemo and the Underwater City (1969).

Along with William Holden and Ernest Borgnine, Ryan was goaded by Sam Peckinpah during the making of The Wild Bunch (1969). After production in Mexico moved from Parras to Torreón, his request to take a few days off to campaign for Eugene McCarthy during the 1968 Democratic Party presidential primaries was denied by Peckinpah. In his biography Golden Boy: The Untold Story of William Holden, Bob Thomas wrote, "For ten days, Ryan reported to the set in makeup and costume. He never played a scene. Finally he grabbed Peckinpah by the shirtfront and growled, 'I'll do anything you ask me to do in front of the camera, because I'm a professional. But you open your mouth to me off the set, and I'll knock your teeth in.'"

Ryan returned to the stage in a revival of The Front Page. It was one of the earlier productions developed by the Plumstead Playhouse (later the Plumstead Theatre Company), a Long Island-based repertory company founded by Ryan, Martha Scott and Henry Fonda; the following winter, a film of the production (produced jointly by MPC and Plumstead) was broadcast nationally over the upstart Hughes TV Network.

=== Final films ===
Ryan supported Burt Lancaster in Lawman (1971) and John Phillip Law in The Love Machine (1971). He appeared in And Hope to Die (1971) with Jean-Louis Trintignant for René Clément.

In April 1971, Ryan returned to the stage to play James Tyrone in Arvin Brown's critically acclaimed Off-Broadway production of Long Day's Journey into Night.

He originally refused the lead in Lolly-Madonna XXX (1973) with Rod Steiger because he wanted to take his wife to Europe, but she died of cancer in May 1972, and he ended up playing the part. "Something very big is missing and I don't know what to put in its place," he said.

Ryan's final roles included: The Man Without a Country (1973), a TV movie for Delbert Mann; The Outfit (1973) with Robert Duvall; Executive Action (1973) with Lancaster, from a script by Dalton Trumbo; and a version of The Iceman Cometh (1973) with Lee Marvin and director Frankenheimer. Ryan, who died before the latter's premiere, won the Kansas City Film Critics Circle Award for Best Supporting Actor, the National Board of Review Award for Best Actor (in a tie with Al Pacino, for Serpico), and a special award from the National Society of Film Critics. The Iceman Cometh and Executive Action both were released in November 1973, after Ryan's death.

Ryan had signed to appear in a stage musical version of Shenandoah when he died.

== Politics ==
Though Ryan served in the military, he came to share the pacifist views of his wife Jessica, who was a Quaker.

In the late 1940s, as the House Committee on Un-American Activities (HUAC) intensified its anti-Communist attacks on Hollywood, he joined the short-lived Committee for the First Amendment. Throughout the 1950s, he donated money and services to civic and religious organizations such as the American Civil Liberties Union, American Friends Service Committee, and United World Federalists. In September 1959, he and Steve Allen became founding co-chairs of The Committee for a SANE Nuclear Policy's Hollywood chapter.

By the mid-1960s, Ryan's political activities included efforts to fight racial discrimination. He served in the cultural division of the Committee to Defend Martin Luther King Jr., and helped organize the short-lived Artists Help All Blacks, with Bill Cosby, Robert Culp, Sidney Poitier, and several other actors.

Ryan often spoke about the dichotomy of his personal beliefs and his acting roles. At a screening of Odds Against Tomorrow, he appeared before the press to discuss "the problems of an actor like me playing the kind of character that in real life he finds totally despicable." Ryan's roles as cynical, prejudiced, violent characters, often ran counter to the causes he embraced. He was a pacifist who starred in war movies, westerns, and violent thrillers. He was an opponent of McCarthyism, but appeared in the anti-communist propaganda film I Married a Communist, playing a nefarious communist agent. In socially progressive films such as Crossfire, Bad Day at Black Rock, Odds Against Tomorrow and Executive Action, he played bigoted villains or conspirators.

== Personal life ==
On March 11, 1939, he married Jessica Cadwalader. They had three children: Timothy (b. 1946); Cheyney (b. 1948; a research fellow at Oxford University, a co-chair of the Oxford Consortium for Human Rights, and an emeritus professor of philosophy and law at the University of Oregon), and Lisa (b. 1951). They lived in the Dakota at 72nd and Central Park West in Manhattan and eventually subleased and later sold the apartment to John Lennon and Yoko Ono where Lennon was shot and killed in the courtyard entryway in 1980.

In the fall of 1951, the progressive Oakwood School was opened in Jessica and Robert Ryan's backyard in Los Angeles; founded by a small group of parents, created and based on their educational and child-rearing views. Three years later, the parents, including the Ryans, Sidney Harmon, Elizabeth Schappert, Wendy and Ross Cabeen, and Charles and Emilie Haas, bought and built the elementary school campus on Moorpark Street in Los Angeles's San Fernando Valley.

== Health issues and death ==
In 1970 Ryan, a heavy smoker, discovered he had inoperable cancer of the lymph glands. He decided to keep working, and said, "I've had a good shot at life."

Ryan died of lung cancer in New York City on 11 July 1973, aged 63. He was predeceased by a year by his wife, also of cancer.

"I've been lucky as hell with my career and my family," he said shortly before he died.

== Appraisal ==
According to a profile of him written by Manohla Dargis after his death:

Born to play beautifully tortured, angry souls... Ryan was a familiar movie face for more than two decades in Hollywood's classical years, his studio ups and downs, independent detours and outlier adventures paralleling the arc of American cinema as it went from a national pastime to near collapse. A little prettier and he might have been one of the golden boys of the golden age. But there could be something a touch menacing about his face (something open and sweet too), which bunched as tight as a fist, and his towering height (he stood 6 foot 4) at times loomed like a threat. The rage boiled up in him so quickly. It made him seem dangerous. He was known for his villains, and it was the complexity of these characters, their emotional and psychological kinks, that elevated even his lesser roles. He never achieved the supernova stardom of a Gable or Bogart, and these days Ryan's glower may be more familiar than his name. Yet he was the type of next-level star and B-movie stalwart that helped make old Hollywood great.

Jeff Bridges, who co-starred with Ryan in The Iceman Cometh, has cited him as an inspiration. Kris Kristofferson referred to him as one of his favorite actors.

== Filmography ==
Year	Title	Role	Notes
1940	The Ghost Breakers	Intern	Uncredited
1940	Queen of the Mob	Jim	
1940	Golden Gloves	Pete Wells	
1940	North West Mounted Police	Constable Dumont	
1940	The Texas Rangers Ride Again	Eddie	Uncredited
1943	Bombardier	Joe Connors	
1943	The Sky's the Limit	Reginald Fenton	
1943	Behind the Rising Sun	Lefty O'Doyle	
1943	The Iron Major	Father Timothy 'Tim' Donovan	
1943	Gangway for Tomorrow	Joe Dunham	
1943	Tender Comrade	Chris Jones	
1944	Marine Raiders	Capt. Dan Craig	
1947	Trail Street	Allen	
1947	The Woman on the Beach	Scott	
1947	Crossfire	Montgomery	
1948	Berlin Express	Robert Lindley	
1948	Return of the Bad Men	Sundance Kid	
1948	The Boy with Green Hair	Dr. Evans	
1948	Act of Violence	Joe Parkson	
1949	Caught	Smith Ohlrig	
1949	The Set-Up	Stoker	
1949	The Woman on Pier 13	Brad Collins	
1950	The Secret Fury	David Mclean	
1950	Born to Be Bad	Nick	
1951	Hard, Fast and Beautiful	Seabright Tennis Match Spectator	Uncredited
1951	Best of the Badmen	Jeff Clanton	
1951	Flying Leathernecks	Capt. Carl 'Griff' Griffin	
1951	The Racket	Nick Scanlon	
1951	On Dangerous Ground	Jim Wilson	
1952	Clash by Night	Earl Pfeiffer	
1952	Beware, My Lovely	Howard Wilton	
1952	Horizons West	Dan Hammond	
1953	The Naked Spur	Ben Vandergroat	
1953	City Beneath the Sea	Brad Carlton	
1953	Inferno	Donald Whitley Carson III	
1954	Alaska Seas	Matt Kelly	
1954	About Mrs. Leslie	George Leslie	
1954	Her Twelve Men	Joe Hargrave	
1955	Bad Day at Black Rock	Reno Smith	
1955	House of Bamboo	Sandy Dawson	
1955	Escape to Burma	Jim Brecan/Martin	
1955	The Tall Men	Nathan Stark	
1956	The Proud Ones	Marshal Cass Silver	
1956	Back from Eternity	Bill Lonagan	
1957	Men in War	Lt. Benson	
1958	Lonelyhearts	William Shrike	
1958	God's Little Acre	Ty Ty Walden	
1958	The Great Gatsby	Jay Gatsby	Television adaptation of Fitzgerald's novel
1959	Day of the Outlaw	Blaise Starrett	
1959	Odds Against Tomorrow	Earle Slater	
1960	Ice Palace	Thor Storm	
1961	The Canadians	Inspector William Gannon	
1961	King of Kings	John the Baptist	
1962	The Longest Day	Brig. Gen. James M. Gavin	
1962	Billy Budd	John Claggart, Master-at-Arms	
1964	World War One	Narrator	
1965	The Crooked Road	Richard Ashley	
1965	The Dirty Game	General Bruce	
1965	Battle of the Bulge	Gen. Grey	
1966	The Professionals	Ehrengard	
1967	The Busy Body	Charley Barker	
1967	The Dirty Dozen	Col. Everett Dasher Breed	
1967	Hour of the Gun	Ike Clanton	
1967	Custer of the West	Sgt. Patrick Mulligan	
1968	A Minute to Pray, a Second to Die	New Mexico Gov. Lem Carter	
1968	Anzio	General Carson	
1969	The Wild Bunch	Deke Thornton	
1969	Captain Nemo and the Underwater City	Captain Nemo	
1971	Lawman	Marshall Sabbath Cotton Ryan	
1971	The Love Machine	Gregory 'Greg' Austin	
1972	... and Hope to Die	Charley Ellis	
1973	Lolly-Madonna XXX	Pap Gutshall	
1973	The Outfit	Mailer	Released posthumously
1973	Executive Action	Robert Foster	Released posthumously
1973	The Iceman Cometh	Larry Slade	Released posthumously

== Partial stage credits ==
Year	Title	Role	Venue	Notes	Ref.
1939	Too Many Husbands		Max Reinhardt Workshop, Los Angeles		
1941–1942	Clash by Night	Joe W. Doyle	Belasco Theatre, New York	Broadway debut	
1949	Petticoat Fever		La Jolla Playhouse, San Diego		
1950	Born Yesterday		La Jolla Playhouse, San Diego		
1960	Antony and Cleopatra	Mark Antony	American Shakespeare Theatre, Stratford		
1962–1963	Mr. President	Pres. Stephen Decatur Henderson	St. James Theatre, New York		
1968	Our Town	Mr. Charles Webb	Mineola Playhouse, Long Island		
1968	The Front Page	Walter Burns	Mineola Playhouse, Long Island		
1969–1970	The Front Page	Walter Burns	Ethel Barrymore Theatre, New York		
1971	Long Day's Journey into Night	James Tyrone	Promenade Theatre, New York		

== Awards and nominations ==
Award	Year	Category	Work	Result
Academy Award	1948	Best Supporting Actor	Crossfire	Nominated
British Academy Film Award	1963	Best Foreign Actor	Billy Budd	Nominated
Drama Desk Award	1971	Vernon Rice Award	Long Day's Journey into Night	Won
Kansas City Film Critics Circle Award	1973	Best Supporting Actor	The Iceman Cometh	Won (posthumously)
National Board of Review Award	1973	Best Actor	The Iceman Cometh	Won (posthumously)
National Society of Film Critics Award	1974	Special Award	The Iceman Cometh	Won (posthumously)
National Society of Film Critics Award	1974	Best Actor	The Iceman Cometh	2nd Place (posthumously)
