= Mudrasta: Ang Beking Ina! =

2025 Philippine comedy film

- Theatrical release poster
- Directed by: Julius Ruslin Alfonso
- Written by: Jonison Fontanos
- Starring: Roderick Paulate; Elmo Magalona; Tonton Gutierrez; Carmi Martin; Awra Briguela; Celia Rodriguez
- Production company: CreaZion Studios
- Release date: August 20, 2025
- Country: Philippines
- Language: Filipino

Mudrasta: Ang Beking Ina! (lit. 'Stepmother: The Gay Mother!') is a 2025 Philippine family comedy film written by Jonison Fontanos and directed Julius Alfonso. It stars Roderick Paulate, Tonton Gutierrez, Carmi Martin, Elmo Magalona, Awra Briguela and Celia Rodriguez. This is Roderick Paulate's first film following a career hiatus.

== Synopsis ==
The film follows Victor “Beki” Labrador, a flamboyant ex-lover who suddenly reenters his former flame's life and home after inheriting half of his estate. Hilarity and heartache ensue as Beki navigates life with the family he once left behind.

== Cast ==
- Roderick Paulate as Victor “Becky” Labrador / Becky Love
- Elmo Magalona as Nicolai V. Santillanes
- Tonton Gutierrez as Enrique Santillanes
- Arkin Magalona as Andrew V. Santillanes
- Celia Rodriguez as Doña Evita Santillanes, Enrique's mother
- Carmi Martin as Melancio Antonio / May Anne
  - Awra Briguela as Young Melancio Antonio
- Sunshine Teodoro
- Debbie Garcia as Emengard
- Odette Khan as Badette
- Emmanuel Dela Cruz
- Mel Kimura
- Joel Saracho as Anton Labrador, Becky's Father
- Ruby Ruiz as Ernesta Labrador, Becky's Mother

== Marketing ==
The film's last shooting day was posted in a social media on March 12, 2021.

The film's trailer was released in YouTube on July 30, 2025, and gaining 6.35 million views and hitting #11 on YouTube's Top 30 Trailers in the Philippines.

== Music ==
Mudrasta: Ang Beking Ina! OST
No.	Title	Writer(s)	Artist	Length
1.	"Bekiful (Are You Yourself)"		Roderick Paulate
2.	"Mr. Dreamboy"	Snaffu Rigor	Sheryl Cruz	3:24
3.	"My Love Will See You Through"	Nonoy Tan	Marco Sison	4:22
4.	"Mother Figure"		Roderick Paulate
5.	"The Fate of Mudrasta"

== Release ==
The film is supposed to be part of 2021 Metro Manila Film Festival but didn't make it to the final selection. T-Rex Entertainment planned to release the film in 2023 but didn't happen due to Paulate's graft charges after his term as a government official, On July 30, 2025, CreaZion Studios posted in their social media the trailer of the film together with the cast and release date and was released on August 20, 2025.

== Reception ==
Fred Hawson of News.ABS-CBN.com gave the film a rating of 5 over 10 and wrote; The comic chemistry between Paulate and Martin, developed back in the 1980s during their variety show Tonight with Dick and Carmi, was as strong as ever. The transition from Briguela to Martin was so radically different, that casting decision was comedy genius.

Alwin Ignacio of Daily Tribune said about the film; The overall vibe was not only congenial, but communal. Familiarity did not breed contempt at that appointed time.
