= Project X (1949 film) =

1949 American thriller film

- Directed by: Edward Montagne
- Screenplay by: Edward Montagne; Earl Kennedy; Gene Hurley; Joyce Selznick; Mitchell Johnson
- Produced by: Edward Leven
- Starring: Keith Andes; Rita Colton; Jack Lord
- Cinematography: Don Malkames
- Edited by: Theodore Waldeyer
- Music by: Hi Fuchs
- Production company: Trans Continental
- Distributed by: Film Classics
- Release date: October 14, 1949
- Running time: 60 minutes
- Country: United States
- Language: English

Project X is a 1949 American thriller film directed by Edward Montagne and starring Keith Andes. It was also known as Red Bait.

== Cast ==
- Keith Andes as Steve Monahan
- Rita Colton as Sandra Russell
- Jack Lord as John Bates
- Kit Russell as Michael Radik
- Joyce Quinlan as Joan
- Harry Clark as Jed
- Robert Noe as Henderson
- Joanne Tree as Gert
- Craig Kelly as Martin
- Tom Ahearne as Fraser (as Tom Ahearn)
- Dorothy Renard as Secretary Henderson
- William Gibberson as Hadwaiter
