= Back from Eternity =

1956 film by John Farrow

- Theatrical release poster
- Directed by: John Farrow
- Screenplay by: Jonathan Latimer
- Story by: Richard Carroll
- Based on: Five Came Back; 1939 film by John Farrow
- Produced by: John Farrow
- Starring: Robert Ryan; Anita Ekberg; Rod Steiger; Phyllis Kirk; Keith Andes; Gene Barry
- Cinematography: William C. Mellor
- Edited by: Eda Warren
- Music by: Franz Waxman
- Production company: RKO Radio Pictures
- Distributed by: RKO Radio Pictures
- Release date: September 8, 1956 (United States)
- Running time: 100 minutes
- Country: United States
- Language: English
- Box office: $1.5 million (US rentals)

Back from Eternity is a 1956 American drama film about a planeload of people stranded in the South American jungle and subsequently menaced by headhunters. The film stars Robert Ryan, Rod Steiger, Anita Ekberg and Gene Barry. The film is a remake of the 1939 film Five Came Back, also directed and produced by John Farrow. Richard Carroll, who is credited with writing the story for Back from Eternity, wrote the original story for Five Came Back.

== Plot ==
A Douglas DC-2, from a tiny South American airline, is piloted by Captain Bill Lonagan and co-pilot Joe Brooks, bound for Boca Grande. The passengers are: Jud Ellis, a man of privilege escorting his new fiancée Louise Melhorn; repentant political assassin Vasquel, being transported back to the proper authorities by bounty hunter Crimp; mobster Pete Bostwick, accompanying the son of his boss, Tommy; elderly Professor Spangler, accompanied on a research trip by his wife of 42 years; and prostitute Rena, on her way to work a South American casino.

To Louise's disgust, a local tries to sell Tommy a shrunken head at the airport. During the flight, Vasquel, a self-proclaimed student of people, recounts his precise knowledge of cannibals and how they shrink the heads to the Spanglers. He also taunts Crimp, who reads aloud a newspaper article detailing the murder of Tommy's father before Bostwick stops him and tries to distract the boy.

The aircraft enters a rough storm and is dangerously jostled about, resulting in Crimp losing his revolver. A portable oxygen tank is loosened from its mooring and crashes through one of the fuselage doors. Flight attendant Maria Alvarez plummets to her death while trying to keep Tommy away from the open door. After a fire breaks out in the cockpit, the crew is forced to make an emergency landing at a clearing in the remote jungle.

Tensions soon mount, exacerbated by both their plight and clashing personalities. After first trying to attract Ellis, Rena finds herself drawn to the world weary Lonagan. They form a connection, understanding each other's lot in life; he was a highly regarded pilot on major airlines until turning to drink after his wife died, while she is a post-war displaced person unable to get a passport, taken advantage of by men who pushed her into her profession. The group works to repair the plane while Professor Spangler keeps a journal of their situation.

Crimp tries to take charge of the group, but Vasquel stops him, revealing he has Crimp's revolver – which he gives to Captain Lonagan as the legal authority of the stranded group. Late one night, Crimp renders Bostwick temporarily unconscious, steals the revolver, then flees into the jungle.

Ellis is consistently self-serving, to the disappointment of Louise, who finds herself mutually attracted to the brave and upright co-pilot Brooks. When Ellis gets drunk one night and tries to force himself upon Louise, Brooks stops him. Louise soon finds herself attracted to Brooks and suspects the same of Rena. Jealous of Rena, Louise confronts her and the two women, assigned clothes washing duties by Lonagan, have "... a knock-down and drag-out fight" in a nearby stream.

After a fortnight of effort, the aircraft is nearly repaired. Tommy wanders into the jungle but is found by Bostwick and Rena, who discover Crimp's headless body. Rena and Tommy return to camp, but local headhunters kill Bostwick with a poison dart.

Everyone quickly boards the plane, but when Lonagan and Brooks start the engines, they discover an oil leak in one engine. Lonagan patches it, but informs the others that it will not hold long. With only one good engine, the aircraft can carry only five people – Tommy plus four adults – over the mountains.

Everyone but Ellis quickly volunteers to be amongst the four who must stay behind and face the headhunters. With gun in hand, Vasquel takes charge, saying he will stay and will choose the other three via logic. The Spanglers, the most elderly, convince Vasquel they should stay. Vasquel selects Ellis as well, then has to kill him when Ellis grabs for the gun. The aircraft manages to take off.

As the headhunters close in, Vasquel saves the Spanglers from torture by shooting them with the last two bullets, then prays as he awaits a horrible death.

== Cast ==
- Robert Ryan as Bill Lonagan
- Anita Ekberg as Rena
- Rod Steiger as Vasquel
- Phyllis Kirk as Louise Melhorn
- Keith Andes as Joe Brooks
- Gene Barry as Jud Ellis
- Fred Clark as Crimp
- Beulah Bondi as Martha Spangler
- Cameron Prud'Homme as Professor Henry Spangler
- Jesse White as Pete Bostwick
- Adele Mara as Maria Alvarez – Stewardess
- Jon Provost as Tommy Malone
- Tristram Coffin as Paul, Rena's "patron"
- James Burke as Grimsby, Airline Manager
- Tol Avery as Thomas J. Malone
- Joe Gray as Gambler
- Charles Meredith as Dean Simmons
- Harold J. Stone as Dealer

== Production ==
In 1951, RKO producer Sam Wiesenthal hired D. M. Marshman to write a new version of Five Came Back. Marshman was reportedly going to incorporate a recent incident in Rio de Janeiro where a cable car broke down and left people marooned in the air.

John Farrow agreed to direct a remake as part of a three-picture deal with RKO.

Production began in February 1956 and principal photography took place from March 5 to April 26.

The fight scene between Kirk and Ekberg required the creation of a stream on the movie's sound set, equipped with running water and foam rubber rocks to avoid injury to the two actresses and seven takes before final filming. Kirk said she and Ekberg were exhausted after the fight.

The supposed New York airport control tower shown near the beginning of the film is actually that of the Lockheed Air Terminal in Burbank, California.

Barbara Eden made her screen debut in Back from Eternity, in a minor, uncredited role as a photojournalist.

== Reception ==
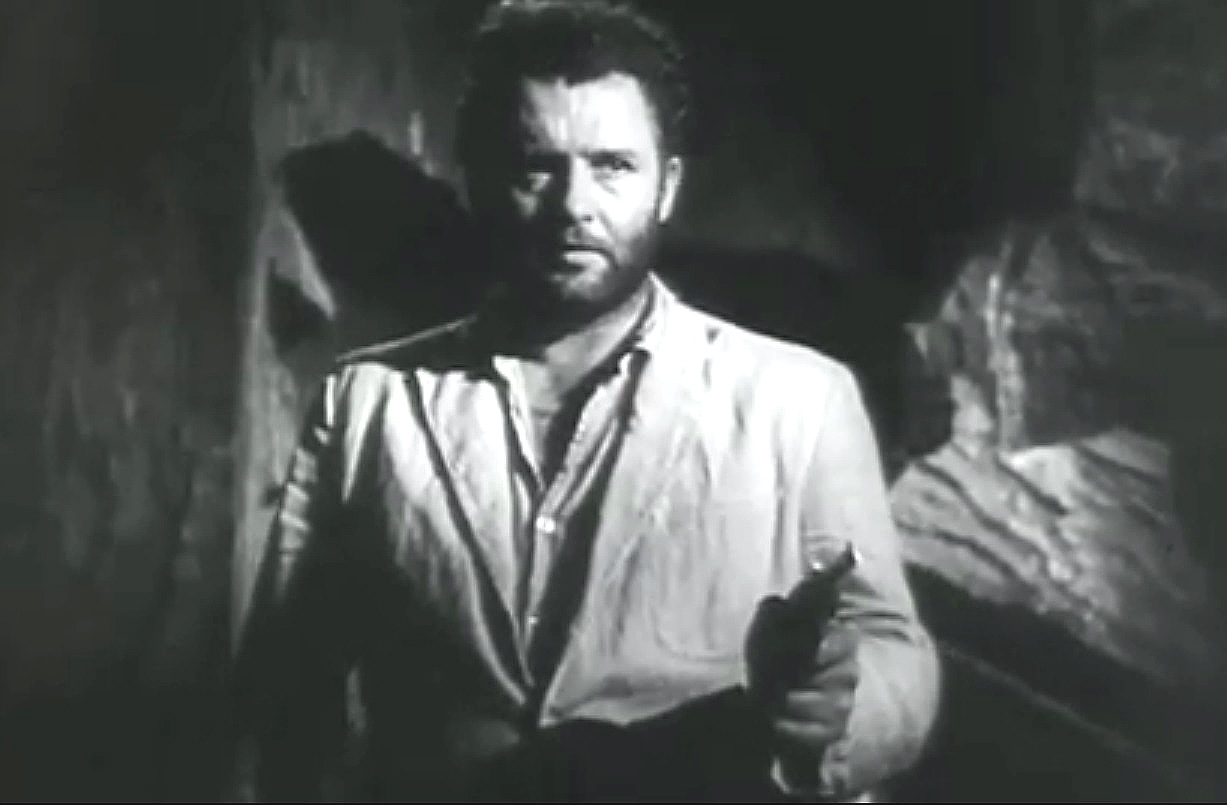
Rod Steiger

Despite its earlier notable screen heritage, Back from Eternity did not have a positive review from film critic Bosley Crowther at The New York Times. He said, in part, " ... the plight of a group of people downed in the South American wilds when the airliner in which they are traveling is forced to crash land by a violent thunderstorm ... This is the undistinguished company, and we hasten to advise that nothing that happens to them is either inspired or interesting. "

== See also ==
- List of American films of 1956
- Survival films
