= The Secret Fury =

1950 film by Mel Ferrer

- Theatrical release poster
- Directed by: Mel Ferrer
- Screenplay by: Lionel Houser
- Story by: Jack Leonard; James O'Hanlon
- Produced by: Jack H. Skirball; Bruce Manning (uncredited)
- Starring: Claudette Colbert; Robert Ryan
- Cinematography: Leo Tover
- Edited by: Harry Marker
- Music by: Roy Webb
- Production company: Loring Theatre Corporation
- Distributed by: RKO Radio Pictures
- Release date: May 27, 1950
- Running time: 85 minutes
- Country: United States
- Language: English

The Secret Fury is a 1950 American noirish psychological thriller starring Claudette Colbert and Robert Ryan. Directed by Mel Ferrer for RKO Radio Pictures, it also featured a rare screen appearance of Broadway legend Jane Cowl, with Paul Kelly also in support.

== Plot ==
Wealthy touring classical pianist Ellen Ewing is standing at the altar with fiancé David McLean when an intruder stops the marriage ceremony and accuses her of already having wed a few months prior. The stranger claims that this can be verified by the registrar at the small seaside village of Fairview (where Ellen's family has a home, and she indeed had spent time overlapping the date of the alleged nuptial). A call is placed by the Ewing family's longtime lawyer, Gregory Kent, accompanied by the district attorney, Eric Lowell, a recent former suitor still smarting sharply from his jilting. A record of the vows is found.

Not only are the wedding guests and groom shocked, so is Ellen. The couple temporarily calls off the wedding and tries to investigate what's going on. With the help of Kent and Lowell, the couple tracks down and questions the justice of the peace that had signed her wedding papers. He instantly recognizes her as the woman he’s married, as does his wife and their housekeeper, who thanks Ellen for the white roses she’d sent her in gratitude for a kindness.

Soon after, they encounter a hotel maid who also claims to recognize Ellen from having attended to her and her husband back on their wedding day. She even sports a pin that she claims Ellen had gifted her, and which had once belonged to Ellen's mother. Kent and Lowell leave, convinced that Ellen is losing her mind.

Frustrated, David and Ellen next visit the man to whom Ellen is accused of having married, Lucian Randall. He leads her into a back room, taunts her, then becomes threatening. A gunshot is heard and a small "pocketbook" automatic falls to the floor. So does Randall. Ellen is accused of murder on the spot. She is held for trial and tormented by her former suitor, who’s not only prosecuting the case himself to avoid the charge of impropriety should he allow a subordinate to do it, but clearly being vengeful towards Ellen for her spurning.

Eventually, confounded both by all the things she knows—or believes—did not happen, with no one believing her, and hectored ceaselessly, Ellen suffers a breakdown on the witness stand. Kent changes her plea from not guilty to insanity, and she is committed to an asylum. Once there she retreats into uncommunicativeness and persists in a waking coma.

Through it all David remains supportive and convinced of Ellen's innocence. David embarks on an errand to the Ewing retreat in Fairfield that all involved hope will help snap her out of her withdrawn state. There, by accident, he finds a seashell among Ellen's things that she had described to David as evidence that could help substantiate her story of her whereabouts and doings on the date of the alleged wedding ceremony. Inspired by this, he attempts to track down another clue, and is successful in locating a dory with a unique name Ellen had said she’d seen beach-combing that day.

David next goes to the home of the justice of the peace, but it’s empty; a passing postman tells him nobody by that name has ever lived there. Armed with these three big breaks David calls Kent and tells him the good news, then says he’s staying in Fairfield to dig some more. He locates the maid, but she stonewalls him. Offering her "big money" for revealing who had put her up to the hoax, David arranges to meet her back at her apartment later that evening.

Before he can learn the truth, she is garroted with a wire by an unseen assailant. David arrives moments later, too late to help or catch the murderer. Failing to call the police, he leaves in his car...and is shortly attacked by the same man, the stranger who'd interrupted his wedding vows. They have a brutal fistfight and David prevails. David wheedles a confession out of the stranger that he'd been put up to everything, and had killed the maid, but not the husband. He refuses to divulge who’s paying him, then dies in a jump from David's car.

David returns to the city and shortly things begin to fall into place. He and Kent visit Ellen and tell her she's been cleared and will be set free, but immediately after appearing to grasp it and return to reality she shrieks in horror and flees. Some time later David, Aunt Clara, Kent and Lowell meet and determine Ellen should be placed back home, with Aunt Clara. Shortly afterwards Aunt Clara retires to bed, only to find a completely clear-headed, ruthless, armed Ellen hiding in her bedroom. She tells Aunt Clara to stay in her room, then stalks Kent, who had given himself away to her by the unique way he folds matches when nervous. Unconcerned, he confesses he’d been behind the whole thing, seeking revenge on Ellen's father, a judge, for an injustice the man had inflicted on him—a four-year sentence in an insane asylum he says he didn't deserve. Now that Ellen is out, Kent insists Ellen kill him (which she would very much love to do) because it will ensure that she'll go back behind the bars of a mental ward for the rest of her life. He tries repeatedly to force her to shoot, which she finds extremely difficult to resist.

Alerted by a call from Aunt Clara, David shows up and immediately struggles with Kent. In their grappling Kent ends up in front of a mammoth wooden framed mirror, held in place by a prop. Scrambling to get up, he knocks it out and is crushed to death.

Ellen and David embrace. The nightmare is over. They will be free to wed.

== Cast ==
- Claudette Colbert as Ellen R. Ewing
- Robert Ryan as David McLean
- Jane Cowl as Aunt Clara Ewing
- Paul Kelly as District Attorney Eric Lowell
- Philip Ober as Gregory Kent
- Elisabeth Risdon as Dr. Twining
- Doris Dudley as Pearl Collins
- Dave Barbour as Lucian Randall
- Vivian Vance as Leah, the hotel maid
- Percy Helton as Justice of the Peace

== Reception ==
Bosley Crowther lambasted the film, especially the screenplay, writing, "Things must be tough in the picture business when such a respectable cast as is in The Secret Fury, now on the Paramount's screen, descends to such cheap and lurid twaddle as this R.K.O. melodrama is, Claudette Colbert, Robert Ryan, Paul Kelly, Philip Ober, Jane Cowl and even José Ferrer in a 'bit' role are the major performers who expend more physical energy than intelligence on this wantonly unintelligible tale.... To lay any blame on the performers for the nonsense that takes place on the screen would be an obvious injustice."
