= Phyllis Kirk =

American actress (1927–2006)

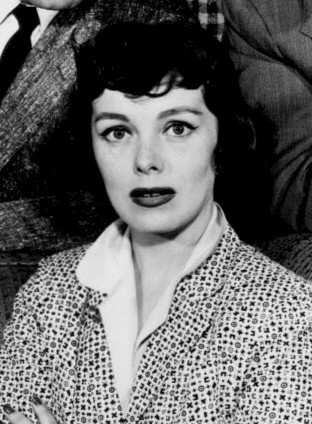
- Kirk in 1955
- Born: Phyllis Kirkegaard; September 18, 1927; Syracuse, New York, U.S.
- Died: October 19, 2006 (aged 79); Woodland Hills, California, U.S.
- Resting place: Arlington National Cemetery
- Occupation: Actress
- Years active: 1949–1970
- Political party: Democratic
- Spouse(s): Warren Bush (m. 1966/1967; died 1991)

Phyllis Kirk (born Phyllis Kirkgaard or Kirkegaard; September 18, 1927 – October 19, 2006) was an American actress.

== Early life ==
Kirk was born in Syracuse, New York, although some sources state her birthplace as Plainfield, New Jersey. She contracted polio as a child, which resulted in health problems for the rest of her life. Kirk grew up in Elizabeth, New Jersey and graduated from Battin High School in 1945.

== Career ==
As a teenager, Kirk moved to New York City to study acting and shortened her last name from Kirkegaard to Kirk. She began her career on Broadway before embarking on a television and film career. Among 1949 stage appearances were My Name is Aquilon in New York and the road company of Present Laughter before beginning her long-term contract with Samuel Goldwyn in Hollywood that summer.

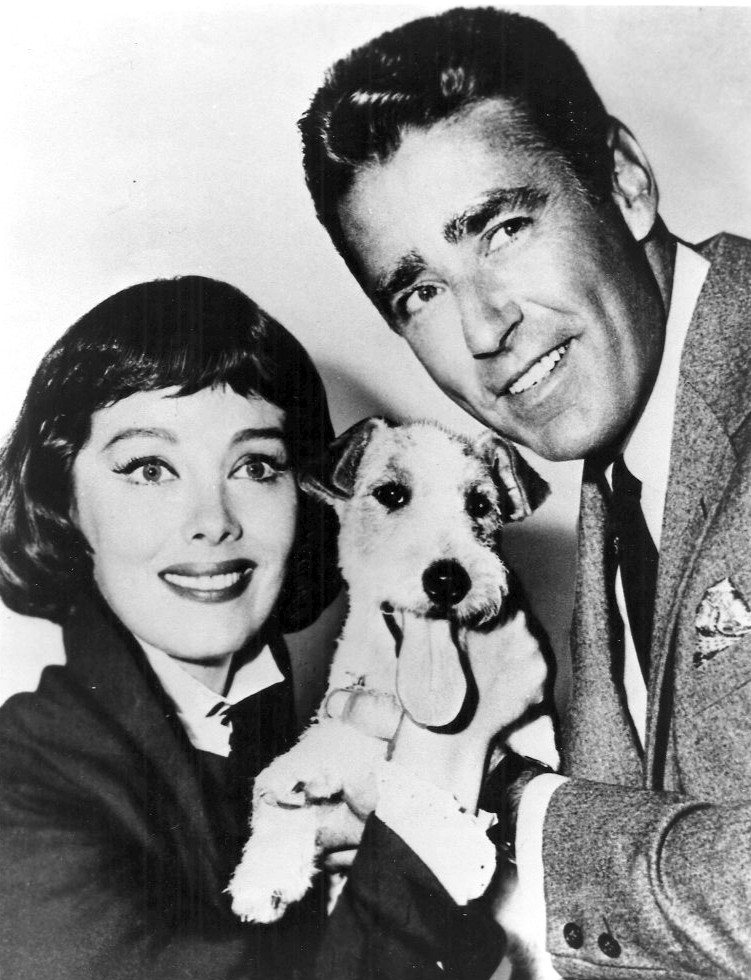
Kirk as Nora Charles with Peter Lawford in The Thin Man television series, 1957

Kirk is best known for her many roles throughout the 1950s. In Two Weeks With Love, she sang and danced with Jane Powell, Richardo Montalban and Debbie Reynolds (1950). She appeared with Vincent Price in the 3D horror film House of Wax (1953), the first major 3D movie. She co-starred as Frank Sinatra's love interest in the western he produced, Johnny Concho (1956). She replaced Gloria Vanderbilt in the role a week before filming began.

Her most notable television role was opposite Peter Lawford in The Thin Man (1957–1959), wherein they played Nick and Nora Charles. A newspaper columnist described what distinguished Kirk's role in the program: "[I]t's her brains that keep her flying high on 'The Thin Man' series." She also received an Emmy nomination as Best Actress in a Leading Role (Continuing Character) in a Dramatic Series in 1959.

She also appeared with Jerry Lewis in his 1957 film The Sad Sack and the 1956 film Back from Eternity. Kirk was a regular on The Red Buttons Show and appeared as a guest on some television programs, including an episode of The Twilight Zone ("A World of His Own"). As her acting career slowed down, Kirk began serving as an activist for various social causes. She vocally opposed death row inmate Caryl Chessman's death sentence and visited Chessman in prison until his execution in 1960. After the Watts Riots in 1965, she funded preschool programs for underprivileged families in South Los Angeles.

She granted interviews and wrote for the American Civil Liberties Union newspaper. Kirk made her last onscreen appearance in a 1970 episode of The F.B.I. before leaving show business altogether to enter public relations. She worked as a publicist for CBS News, and retired in 1992.

== Personal life ==
Kirk's marriage to television producer and screenwriter Warren Bush was announced in the press in early 1967, and lasted until his death in 1991 at the age of 65. A Democrat, she attended the 1960 Democratic National Convention in Los Angeles, California.

On October 19, 2006, Kirk died of a cerebral aneurysm at age 79 in Woodland Hills, California. She was buried with her husband Warren Bush at Arlington National Cemetery in Virginia.

== Filmography ==
=== Film ===
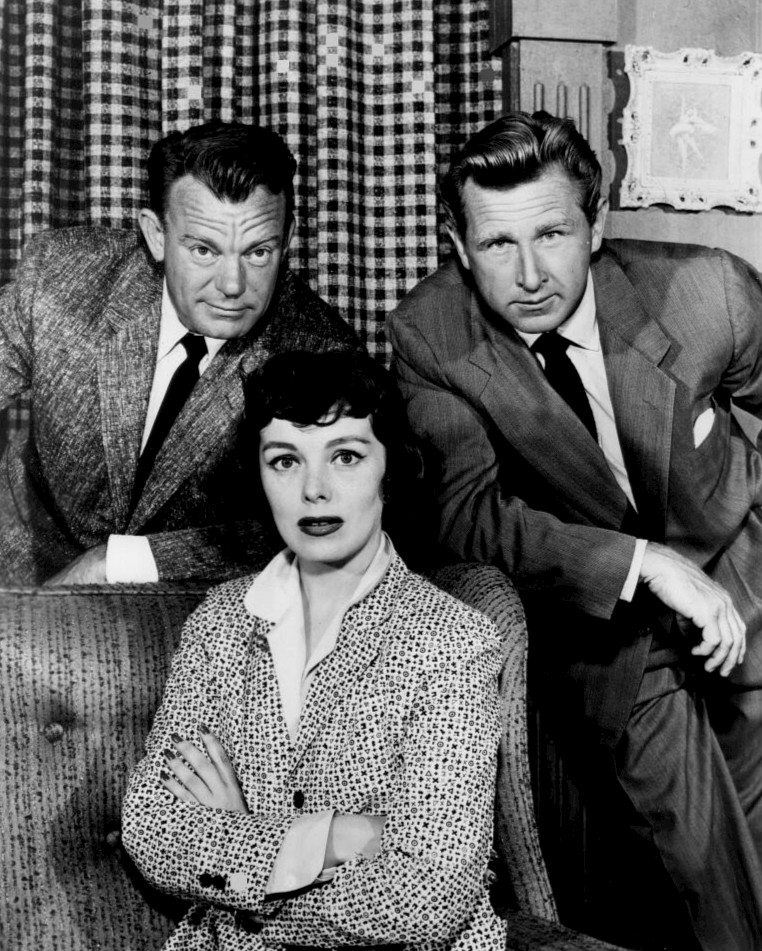
L-R: Dennis O'Keefe, Phyllis Kirk, and Lloyd Bridges in an episode of TV's Climax! (1955)

Year	Title	Role	Notes
1950	Our Very Own	Zaza	
1950	A Life of Her Own	Jerry	
1950	Two Weeks with Love	Valerie Stresemann	
1950	Mrs. O'Malley and Mr. Malone	Kay	
1951	Three Guys Named Mike	Kathy Hunter	
1952	Just This Once	Young Lover on Ferry	Uncredited
1952	About Face	Alice Wheatley	
1952	She's Working Her Way Through College	Co-ed	Uncredited
1952	The Iron Mistress	Ursula de Varamendi	
1952	Stop, You're Killing Me	Nurse	Uncredited
1953	House of Wax	Sue Allen	
1953	Crime Wave	Ellen Lacey	
1953	Thunder Over the Plains	Norah Porter	
1954	River Beat	Judy Roberts	
1955	Canyon Crossroads	Katherine Rand	
1956	Johnny Concho	Mary Dark	
1956	Back from Eternity	Louise Melhorn	
1957	That Woman Opposite	Eve Atwood	
1957	The Sad Sack	Major Shelton	

=== Television ===
Year	Title	Role	Notes
1952	The Philco Television Playhouse	Dolly	1 episode
1952	Tales of Tomorrow	Irene Chappell	1 episode
1952–1956	Studio One	Various Characters	4 episodes
1953	World by the Tail		TV movie
1953	Armstrong Circle Theatre		1 episode
1953	The United States Steel Hour	Betty Lou	1 episode
1953–1954	Lux Video Theatre		2 episodes
1953–1954	Goodyear Television Playhouse	Girl	3 episodes
1953–1954	The Web	Meg Loomis	2 episodes
1953–1957	Robert Montgomery Presents	Various Characters	4 episodes
1954	Suspense		1 episode
1954	Your Show of Shows		1 episode
1954	Justice		1 episode
1955	Appointment with Adventure		(CBS anthology series), 1 episode
1955	Playwrights '56	Girl Friend	1 episode
1955	Letter to Loretta	Jess Blackston	1 episode
1955	The Red Buttons Show	Various Characters	Unknown episodes
1955–1956	Climax!	Various Characters	3 episodes
1956	Schlitz Playhouse of Stars	Barbara Hunter	1 episode
1956	Celebrity Playhouse	Laurie Westbrook	2 episodes
1956	Playhouse 90	Nancy Tennant	1 episode
1956–1957	The Ford Television Theatre	Various Characters	4 episodes
1957	The Errol Flynn Theatre		2 episodes
1957	The 20th Century Fox Hour	Barbara Sherwood	1 episode
1957–1959	The Thin Man	Nora Charles	72 episodes
1958	The Ford Show, Starring Tennessee Ernie Ford	Herself	1 episode
1960	Dick Powell's Zane Grey Theater	Ann Bagley	1 episode
1960	The Twilight Zone	Victoria West	Episode: "A World of His Own"
1970	The F.B.I.	Nora Tobin	1 episode, (final appearance)

== Award nominations ==
Year	Award	Category	Series	Result
1959	Emmy Award	Best Actress in a Leading Role (Continuing Character) in a Dramatic Series	The Thin Man	Nominated
