= Surrender - Hell! =

1959 film by John Barnwell

- Directed by: John Barnwell
- Written by: John Barnwell; Philip Harkins; Charles Martin
- Produced by: Preston Sturges
- Starring: Keith Andes; Susan Cabot; Paraluman; Vic Diaz
- Cinematography: Mike Accion
- Edited by: Gerardo de Leon
- Music by: Francisco Buencamino, Jr.
- Production company: Cory Film Corp.
- Distributed by: Allied Artists Picture Corporation
- Release date: July 26, 1959
- Running time: 85 minutes
- Country: United States
- Language: English

Surrender - Hell! is a 1959 American film based on the exploits of Donald Blackburn in World War II, fighting as a guerrilla leader during the Japanese occupation of the Philippines.

== Plot ==
Don Blackburn is stationed in the Philippines at the outset of World War II. After the order to surrender in 1942, Blackburn flees rather than becoming a prisoner. Helped by civilians, he eventually makes his way into the mountains of Luzon, where he organizes the headhunter tribes into a guerrilla force. Along with other similar forces, they liberate northern Luzon to aid in the reconquest of the Philippines.

== Cast ==
- Keith Andes as Colonel Donald D. Blackburn
- Susan Cabot as Delia Guerrero
- Paraluman as Pilar
- Nestor de Villa as Major Bulao
- Vic Diaz as Village Market Owner (uncredited)
