= Johnny Concho =

1956 film by Don McGuire

- Theatrical release poster
- Directed by: Don McGuire
- Screenplay by: David P. Harmon; Don McGuire
- Story by: David P. Harmon
- Produced by: Henry W. Sanicola
- Starring: Frank Sinatra; Keenan Wynn; William Conrad; Phyllis Kirk
- Cinematography: William C. Mellor
- Edited by: Eda Warren
- Music by: Nelson Riddle
- Production company: Kent Productions
- Distributed by: United Artists
- Release date: July 1956 (United States)
- Running time: 85 minutes
- Country: United States
- Language: English
- Box office: $1.9 million (US)

Johnny Concho is a 1956 American Western film directed by Don McGuire starring Frank Sinatra, Keenan Wynn, William Conrad and Phyllis Kirk. This was Sinatra's first serious Western and the role allowed him to play against type in his portrayal of a person of low repute. The film was unsuccessful for Sinatra, ending a string of 8 hit films (5 in the past 13 months) going back to 1953's From Here to Eternity.

== Plot ==
Johnny Concho is also a coward, but the people of Cripple Creek, Arizona, let him have his way. They know that Johnny's brother, who doesn't live in town, is the gunfighter Red Concho, someone they truly fear.

Mary Dark, daughter of the general store's owner, is in love with Johnny, but isn't yet aware of the kind of man he really is.

Johnny has everyone so cowed that, in a card game, he needn't even show his hand to claim the pot. That lasts until the day a man named Tallman comes to town. Tallman calls the bluff of Johnny at the poker table. Johnny wants the sheriff, Henderson, to take care of this, but Tallman stuns everyone by announcing that he recently stood up to Red Concho in another town and killed him.

Exposed for the yellow-belly he is, Johnny rides off. Mary still loves him and follows, but wherever Johnny goes, word reaches that he is not a man to be trusted or feared. Tallman, meanwhile, has taken over Johnny's role in Cripple Creek, appointing himself as the law and demanding to be paid a percentage from every business in town.

Mary still wants to marry Johnny, but at the wedding his cowardice comes out once more. A man who knew his brother informs him that Red was actually just like Johnny, a blowhard with no guts.

Johnny pulls himself together and returns to Cripple Creek to face Tallman in the street. Tallman wounds him, but the townspeople are impressed by Johnny's bravery and willing to help. Mary's father shoots Tallman and kills him. Johnny prepares to leave town, knowing he's not wanted here, but Mary and the others invite him to stay.

== Cast ==
- Frank Sinatra as Johnny Concho / Johnny Collins
- Keenan Wynn as Barney Clark
- William Conrad as Tallman
- Phyllis Kirk as Mary Dark
- Wallace Ford as Albert Dark
- Dorothy Adams as Sarah Dark
- Christopher Dark as Walker
- Howard Petrie as Joe Helguson, The Blacksmith
- Harry Bartell as Sam Green
- Dan Riss as Judge Earl Tyler
- Willis Bouchey as Sheriff Henderson
- Robert Osterloh as Duke Lang
- Jean Byron as Pearl Lang
- Leo Gordon as Mason
- Claude Akins as Lem
- John Qualen as Jake
- Budd Knapp as Pearson (credited as Wilfred Knapp)
- Ben Wright as Benson
- Joe Bassett as Harry, The Bartender
- Strother Martin as Townsman

== Availability ==
Johnny Concho has never been made available on home video in any form. There is a Region 2 DVD featuring an Italian dub, but it is of questionable legitimacy. A low-quality bootleg exists online, transferred from a VHS taping of a rare TV screening. Despite the fact that the film was produced by Sinatra himself and the copyright is owned directly by the Sinatra estate, there seem to be no plans to release it on physical media or streaming in the near future.
