= Hongkong Holiday =

1957 musical romantic comedy film by Mar S. Torres

- Theatrical release poster
- Directed by: Mar S. Torres
- Screenplay by: Luciano B. Carlos
- Produced by: José O. Vera
- Starring: Gloria Romero; Ric Rodrigo; Dolphy; Paraluman; Daisy Romualdez
- Music by: Nestor Robles; Hongkong Symphony Orchestra
- Production companies: Sampaguita Pictures; Golden City Film Productions
- Release date: January 28, 1957
- Country: Philippines
- Language: Filipino
- Box office: ₱132,000 (₱20.6 million in 2025 Philippine peso)

Hongkong Holiday is a 1957 Filipino musical romantic comedy film directed by Mar S. Torres. The film stars Gloria Romero, Ric Rodrigo, Dolphy, Paraluman and Daisy Romualdez, under the production of Sampaguita Pictures and Golden City Film Production. The film follows the story of Ana, the daughter of a wealthy Chinese magnate, who escaped from her family after finding out about the upcoming arranged marriage.

== Cast ==
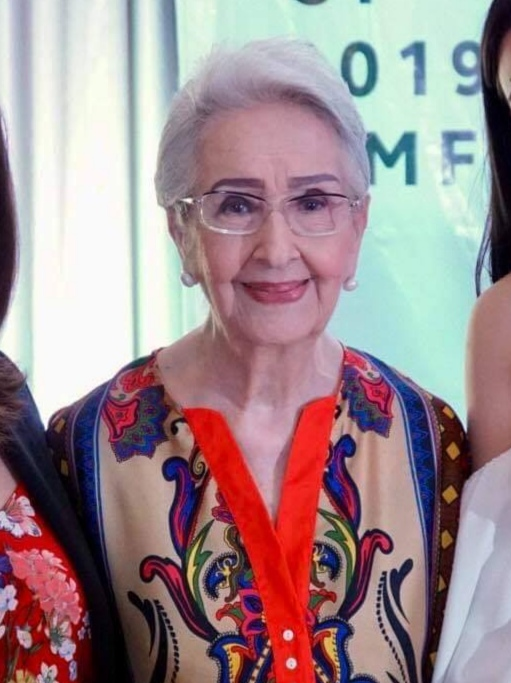
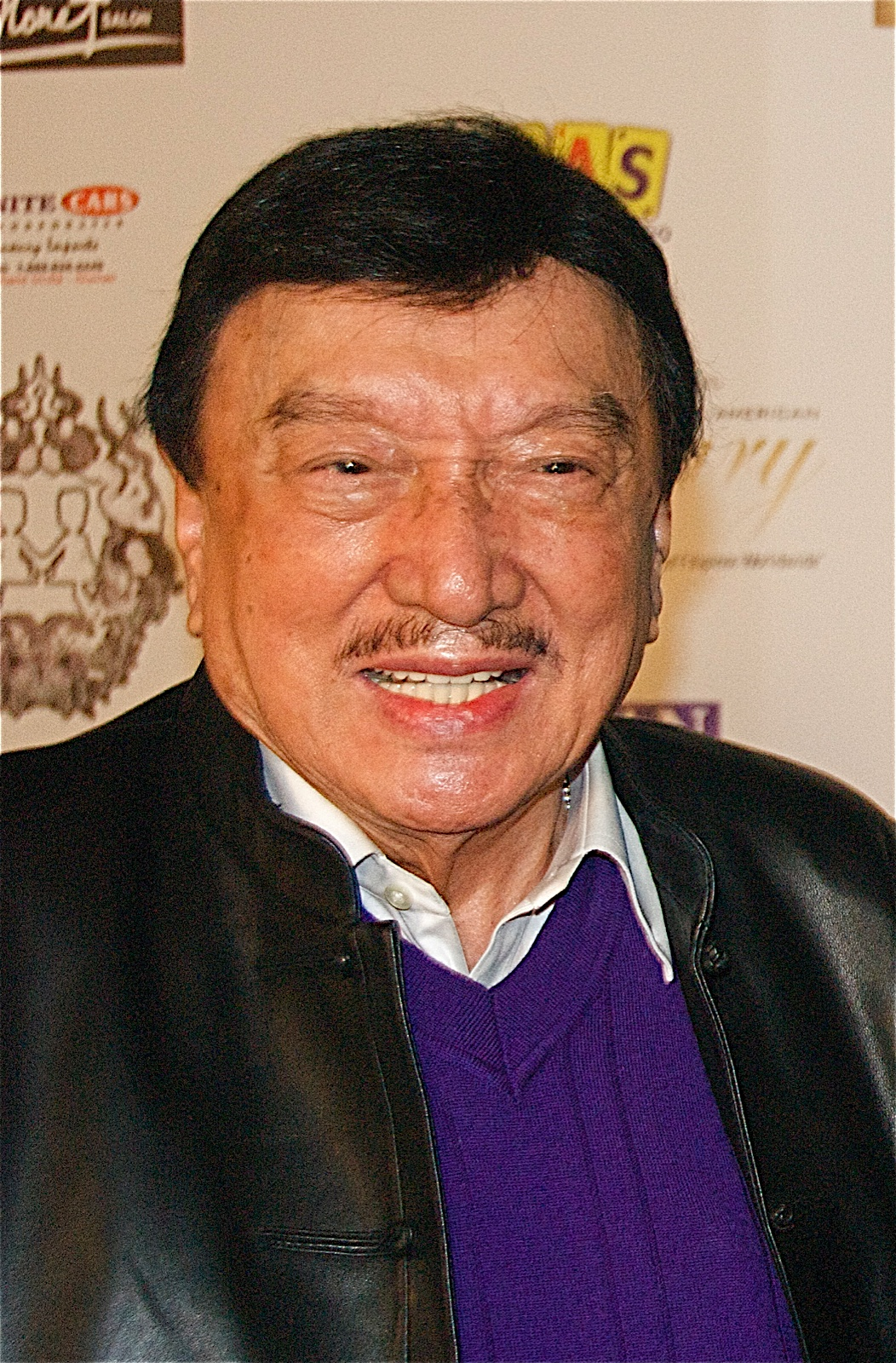
Gloria Romero (left) and Dolphy (right).
- Gloria Romero as Ana
- Ric Rodrigo as Robert
- Dolphy
- Paraluman
- Daisy Romualdez
- Liza Ferrer
- Aring Bautista
- Tony Cayado

== Production ==
Romero revealed in an interview with The Philippine Star that the production flew to Hong Kong in 1955 and stayed for a month to shoot the scenes for the film.

== Release ==
=== Box office ===
Hongkong Holiday was a commercial success upon its release. The film has grossed more in its first four days than any other film in the Philippines at that time, surpassing the box-office record set by Roberta (1951). Hongkong Holiday earned ₱82,793 within its first 10 days and grossed around ₱132,000 throughout its run, becoming the second highest-grossing film of 1957 in the Philippines.

=== Critical reception ===
Ria Limjap of Spot.ph praised Romero and Dolphy's portrayals in the film, with emphasis on Dolphy's performance, saying that he "brought a vaudevillian energy to motion pictures with his lightness of foot and lightness of heart".

== See also ==
- List of Hong Kong films of 1957
