= Clash by Night =

1952 film directed by Fritz Lang

- Theatrical release poster
- Directed by: Fritz Lang
- Screenplay by: Alfred Hayes
- Based on: Clash by Night; 1941 play by Clifford Odets
- Produced by: Jerry Wald; Norman Krasna; Harriet Parsons
- Starring: Barbara Stanwyck; Paul Douglas; Robert Ryan; Marilyn Monroe
- Cinematography: Nicholas Musuraca
- Edited by: George Amy
- Music by: Roy Webb
- Production company: Wald/Krasna Productions
- Distributed by: RKO Radio Pictures
- Release date: May 28, 1952
- Running time: 105 minutes
- Country: United States
- Language: English
- Box office: $1.5 million (U.S. rentals)

Clash by Night is a 1952 American film noir directed by Fritz Lang and starring Barbara Stanwyck, Paul Douglas, Robert Ryan, Marilyn Monroe and Keith Andes. The film is based on the 1941 play by Clifford Odets and was adapted for the screen by writer Alfred Hayes.

== Plot ==
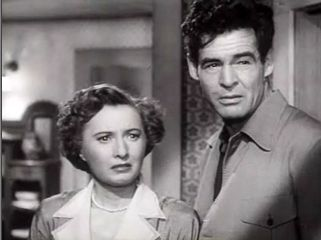
Barbara Stanwyck and Robert Ryan

Mae Doyle returns to her hometown of Monterey, California, after 10 years on the East Coast. Joe, her fisherman brother, is unhappy to see her but accepts her back into the family home. His girlfriend, Peggy, welcomes Mae. When Joe asks Mae about the rich man whom she had been seeing, she explains that he was a married politician. He died and left her some money, but his wife and relatives sued her and won.

Mae begins to date Jerry D'Amato, a good-natured, unsophisticated fisherman with his own boat. She despises Jerry's friend Earl Pfeiffer, a bitter, dissatisfied film projectionist. In stark contrast to Mae's politician lover, who had made her feel confident in herself, Earl has a low opinion of women and makes no attempt to hide it. His wife is a vaudeville performer who is frequently away on tour, and he suspects that she is unfaithful.

Jerry asks Mae to marry him, but she warns him that she is not good for him. Mae and Earl acknowledge that an attraction exists between them, but Mae opts not to explore it. She instead chooses to accept Jerry's proposal, seeking security and hoping that she can change.

About a year later, Mae and Jerry are raising a baby girl, when a very drunk Earl shows up at their house and sleeps over. After Jerry leaves the following morning, Earl forcefully advances on Mae. She initially resists but then begins an affair with him. Jerry's uncle Vince, who bears a grudge against Mae, is aware of the affair and informs his disbelieving nephew. When Jerry confronts the couple, Mae admits that she intends to leave Jerry to be with Earl.

After a few drinks and some prodding by Vince, Jerry finds and starts strangling Earl until Mae arrives and intervenes, prompting Jerry to leave. Mae returns home to take her baby, but finds the crib empty. Earl suggests that they leave without taking the baby, but Mae refuses and instead ends the relationship. Mae goes to Jerry and convinces him to reconcile.

== Cast ==
- Barbara Stanwyck as Mae Doyle D'Amato
- Paul Douglas as Jerry D'Amato
- Robert Ryan as Earl Pfeiffer
- Marilyn Monroe as Peggy
- Keith Andes as Joe Doyle
- Silvio Minciotti as Papa D'Amato
- J. Carrol Naish as Uncle Vince
- Diane and Deborah Stewart as Gloria D'Amato

== Production ==
Clifford Odets' play Clash by Night was originally performed in 1941 as a neorealist Broadway play with Tallulah Bankhead in the lead female role. Robert Ryan, who eventually starred in the film version, was a member of the Broadway cast along with Bankhead at the start of his career.

Joan Crawford was originally scheduled to play the female lead, and her contract was to award her five percent of the film's gross, an unprecedented figure. However, Crawford was forced to withdraw because of her commitments to This Woman Is Dangerous and Sudden Fear. Barbara Stanwyck was announced in August 1951. Marilyn Monroe was cast in the role of Peggy later that month, and Stanwyck and the other stars of the film were so impressed with her work that they lobbied to grant her star billing. The film is Monroe's first to feature her name before the title.

Ryan was cast in December 1950 after renewing a contract with RKO Radio Pictures, but in an unspecified role. Burt Lancaster was rumored to be Crawford's costar, and the producers also sought Richard Carlson, Marlon Brando, Montgomery Clift and Charlton Heston. The search for the male lead caused a delay in production.

Fritz Lang was announced as the director in August 1951. Lang changed the locale from Staten Island to a fishing town in California but preserved the oppressive seacoast atmosphere. However, to satisfy the demands of the Production Code, the tragic ending of the play was changed. Production began on October 8, 1951 with location filming in Monterey, California.

The title of the film, as well as that of the play, is derived from Matthew Arnold's 1851 poem "Dover Beach".

During production, the famous nude calendar photos of Monroe surfaced and reporters hounded her, creating considerable distraction for the filmmakers.

Odets, a former communist, was named by Elia Kazan before the House Un-American Activities Committee shortly before the film's release. RKO studio owner Howard Hughes, a strident anticommunist who had recently stripped communist writer Paul Jarrico of credit for The Las Vegas Story and fired 200 employees in an effort to rid the company of communist influence, was faced with a dilemma. However, a contract with Odets signed two years earlier guaranteed him screen credit, and Hughes feared that a legal battle would force a long delay in the film's release, so Odets' name remained as the credited writer.

== Release ==
Clash by Night premiered in multiple international cities, including New York, Paris and London, on May 28, 1952.

== Reception ==
On the review aggregator Rotten Tomatoes, Clash by Night has a score of 61% based on 18 reviews. On Metacritic, which uses a weighted average, the film has a score of 65 out of 100 based on nine reviews, indicating "generally favorable" reviews.

=== Contemporary ===
In a review for The New York Times, critic A. H. Weiler wrote: "Mr. Odets' play never is the sum of some of its parts. It lacks conviction and distinction despite its hard-working principals. ... Miss Stanwyck is professionally realistic in the role. Paul Douglas is a physically convincing portrait of the simple, muscular and trusting Jerry. But it is difficult to take his extreme idealistic devotion."

Critic Edwin Schallert of the Los Angeles Times wrote: "'Clash by Night' possesses the slashing power of a real drama in the raw. It is contrived excellently and played with high efficiency by its cast nine-tenths of the way."

Variety called the film "a rather aimless drama of lust and passion".

=== Retrospective ===
Louis R. Carlozo of the Chicago Tribune calls the film "super-edgy", while Dave Kehr of the Chicago Reader calls the film "one of Lang's most underrated", praising it's realist naturalism.

Time Out describes Clash by Night as "a very Langian picture of the dangerous undercurrents in emotional relationships, excellently acted by the three principals, interestingly counterpointed by Marilyn Monroe (in her first major role) and Keith Andes as uninhibited young lovers."
