= Split Second (1953 film) =

1953 film by Dick Powell

- Theatrical release poster
- Directed by: Dick Powell
- Screenplay by: Irving Wallace
- Story by: Irving Wallace; Chester Erskine
- Produced by: Edmund Grainger
- Starring: Stephen McNally; Alexis Smith; Jan Sterling; Keith Andes
- Cinematography: Nicholas Musuraca
- Edited by: Robert Ford
- Music by: Roy Webb
- Production company: RKO Pictures
- Distributed by: RKO Pictures
- Release date: May 2, 1953 (US)
- Running time: 85 minutes
- Country: United States
- Language: English

Split Second is a 1953 American film noir thriller directed by Dick Powell about escaped convicts and their hostages holed up in a ghost town, unaware of the grave danger they are in. It features Stephen McNally, Alexis Smith, Jan Sterling, and Keith Andes. It was the only film put into production by the consortium that took over RKO Pictures in late 1952 before previous owner Howard Hughes resumed control of the company.

== Plot ==
Armored car robbers Sam Hurley and Bart Moore escape from a Carson City prison, although Moore is shot in the stomach in the breakout. They are picked up by an accomplice, Dummy, waiting for them on a deserted section of road, who drives them to a gas station where Hurley intends to steal a better car. There he murders the attendant for trying to "play hero" - something Hurley absolutely despises - when the man tries to get the jump on him.

After rifling the register they head for a ghost town on the Nevada Proving Ground to hide out. Along the way, they pick up several hostages, first the wealthy Kay Garven and her lover, insurance man Arthur Ashton, then, when Kay's large luxury sedan runs out of gas she is forced to flag down newspaper reporter Larry Fleming and out-of-work dancer Dorothy "Dottie" Vail in Larry's well-used vintage woody station wagon. They take up quarters in an abandoned saloon, which clearly has been recently inhabited. Later, its sole resident, hermit prospector Asa Tremaine, appears and is also held. Sam calls Kay's husband, Neal, a doctor in Los Angeles, and threatens to kill Kay if he does not come and help Bart. Kay doubts he will come, as she is divorcing him and he knows she has taken up with Arthur.

Larry warns the gangsters that the government is going to conduct an atomic bomb test nearby the next morning, but Sam plans to leave before then, though he leaves it unclear what he plans to do with the hostages. When Arthur tries to be a hero, Sam kills him without a qualm. Despite this, Kay uses her feminine wiles to try to persuade Sam to take her with him. To Kay's surprise, Neal still loves her enough to show up. He successfully operates on Bart, but warns Sam that moving his friend too soon will kill him. Sam waits as long as possible to give Bart time to recuperate.

Unknown to everyone, the test has been moved ahead an hour due to favorable weather conditions. When the five-minute warning sounds earlier than expected, Sam and Bart hurry to Neal's car, and a desperate Kay barges in with them. Larry overpowers Dummy, but Sam drives away. Asa leads Dottie, Larry, and Neal to a nearby mine. Sam initially drives the wrong way, toward the bomb, and the threesome, and Dummy, are killed by the explosion, which incinerates the ghost town, but the others emerge unharmed.

== Cast ==
- Stephen McNally as Sam Hurley
- Alexis Smith as Kay Garven
- Jan Sterling as Dorothy "Dottie" Vail
- Keith Andes as Larry Fleming
- Arthur Hunnicutt as Asa Tremaine
- Paul Kelly as Bart Moore
- Robert Paige as Arthur Ashton
- Richard Egan as Dr. Neal Garven
- Frank de Kova as Dummy

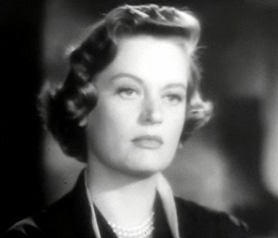
Alexis Smith in the trailer

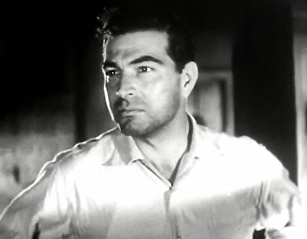
Stephen McNally as the gang leader

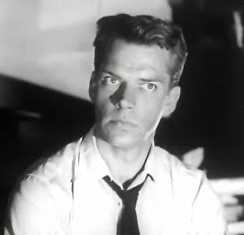
Keith Andes as a reporter and leader of the hostages

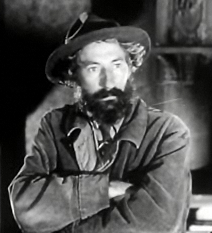
Arthur Hunnicutt as a hermit prospector

== Production ==
Victor Mature and Jane Russell were originally intended as the leads.

Location shooting took place in the Mojave Desert.

== Critical reception ==
When the film was released, The New York Times film critic A. H. Weiler, while praising the cast, gave the film a mixed review, and at the same time encouraged first-time director Dick Powell. He wrote, "In making his directorial debut with Split Second, Dick Powell fortunately acquired a small but enthusiastic and competent cast, a fairly sturdy script and a contemporary peg on which to hang his melodrama ... Unfortunately, however, the pace at which this thriller moves is erratic and while its dénouement is spectacular it is hardly surprising. Split Second is a fairly taut adventure closely tied to the atomic age but it is rarely explosive ... Mr. Powell's initial directorial effort is not likely to startle the cinema world but it is a long step in the right direction."

More recently, film and DVD critic Jamie S. Rich also gave the film a lukewarm review, writing, "The film doesn't have much tension, despite the inherent drama of the scenario. The main reason for this is Hurley. He isn't written as being all that menacing. He's more the know-it-all pessimist who sees through everyone else's charade, rather than the scary murderer who plays mind games with his victims. He stirs up the pot some, but the juiciest stuff emerges all on its own ... the bulk of Split Second is essentially unremarkable. It's a serviceable lower-tier movie that moves at an efficient pace and provides mild entertainment."

Another modern reviewer, Craig Butler from AllMovie, was more positive: "Not as well known as it should be but a favorite of many who know it, Split Second is an incredibly tense film noir-cum-atomic bomb flick that marked an auspicious directorial debut for singer-actor Dick Powell ... Powell is aided in his efforts by the first rate black and white cinematography of Nick Musuraca ... The cast does not disappoint either, with fine work by all ..."

== Bibliography ==
- Jewell, Richard B. Slow Fade to Black: The Decline of RKO Radio Pictures. University of California Press, 2016.
