= Lilet (film) =

1971 Filipino film directed by Gerardo de Leon

- Official movie poster
- Directed by: Gerardo de Leon
- Screenplay by: Pierre Salas
- Story by: Pierre Salas
- Produced by: Mariano Z. Velarde
- Starring: Celia Rodriguez; Ronaldo Valdez; Paraluman; Vic Silayan; Tita Muñoz; Lou Salvador Jr.
- Cinematography: Justo Paulino
- Edited by: Teofilo de Leon
- Music by: Tito Arevalo
- Production companies: Velarde and Associates Productions
- Distributed by: Velarde and Associates Productions
- Release date: 29 January 1971
- Running time: 93 minutes
- Country: Philippines
- Language: Filipino

Lilet is a 1971 Philippine horror film directed by Gerardo de Leon and starring Celia Rodriguez in the title role as a woman with amnesia suffering from hallucinations on return to her family home. It also stars Paraluman, Vic Silayan, and Tita Muñoz as Lilet's family.

Lilet won six FAMAS Awards, including Best Picture, Best Director for de Leon, and Best Actress for Rodriguez.

== Plot ==
Lilet, a woman suffering from amnesia, returns to her family home after several years away. She receives a cold welcome from her parents and her wheelchair-using grandmother. She is driven to hysterics by hallucinations of a masked man wielding a pair of scissors. With the help of her suitor Dr. Edgar, she sheds light on repressed memories that haunt her, revealing her family's dark secrets.

== Cast ==
- Celia Rodriguez as Lilet
- Ronaldo Valdez as Dr. Edgar Leynes
- Paraluman as Amanda
- Vic Silayan as Anton
- Lou Salvador Jr. as Enrico
- Tita Muñoz as Doña Agueda
- Joonee Gamboa as Dr. Antero

== Awards and nominations ==
Award-Giving Body	Category	Recipient	Result
1972 FAMAS Awards
1972 FAMAS Awards	Best Picture	Lilet	Won
1972 FAMAS Awards	Best Director	Gerardo de Leon	Won
1972 FAMAS Awards	Best Actress	Celia Rodriguez	Won
1972 FAMAS Awards	Best Musical Score	Tito Arevalo	Won
1972 FAMAS Awards	Best Cinematography (Colored)	Justo Paulino	Won
1972 FAMAS Awards	Best Editing	Teofilo de Leon	Won
1972 FAMAS Awards	Best Supporting Actor	Vic Silayan	Nominated
1972 FAMAS Awards	Best Supporting Actress	Paraluman	Nominated
1972 FAMAS Awards	Best Supporting Actress	Tita Muñoz	Nominated
