= Bulaklak sa City Jail =

1984 prison drama film by Mario O'Hara

- Official movie poster, released in 1984.
- Directed by: Mario O'Hara
- Written by: Lualhati Bautista
- Based on: City Jail by Lualhati Bautista
- Produced by: Archie Cobarrubias; Cherry Cobarrubias
- Starring: Nora Aunor; Gina Alajar; Celia Rodriguez; Zenaida Amador
- Cinematography: Johnny Araojo
- Edited by: Efren Jarlego
- Music by: Tony Aguilar
- Production company: Cherubim Films
- Release date: December 25, 1984
- Running time: 104 minutes
- Country: Philippines
- Language: Filipino

Bulaklak sa City Jail (English: The Flowers of the City Jail) is a 1984 Filipino neo noir crime prison drama film directed by Mario O'Hara from a story and screenplay written by Lualhati Bautista, based on her novel of the same name that was serialized in Liwayway from 1982 to 1983. Starring Nora Aunor, Gina Alajar, Celia Rodriguez, Perla Bautista, Maya Valdez, Zenaida Amador, and Maritess Gutierrez, the film depicts the situation of women in the city jail.

Produced by Cherubim Films, the film was theatrically released on December 25, 1984, as one of the official entries for the 10th Metro Manila Film Festival. In 2019, it was digitally restored and remastered by ABS-CBN Film Restoration, in association with Kantana Thailand and Wildsound Studios.

== Plot ==
Angela Aguilar, a nightclub singer, was sent to the women's section of the Manila City Jail for the crime of frustrated murder, while awaiting trial. Immediately upon incarceration, she is sexually assaulted by Barbie Berenguer, a lesbian prison overseer, and other women in the jail, and her clothes are taken from her.

Angela shares her cell with Juliet Navarete, who was charged with estafa, Viring, who was imprisoned for killing her husband and is taking care of her daughter inside her jail cell, and Lena, who engages in sexual work inside the jail cell with male prisoners.

The conditions in the jail cell are poor, and the women are subjected to abuse.

- Barbie tries to convince Angela to have sex with Paquito, a male prison warden, upon the latter’s insistence, but it is discovered that Angela is pregnant. Instead, Angela was forced to clean Barbie’s jail cell and latrines.
- Yolly is an inmate who is in a relationship with Kardo, a male inmate, and they sleep together in secret in various jail cells. Yolly catches the attention of Paquito. Paquito and other prison guards and inmates manhandle Kardo, and Kardo tries to convince Yolly to have sex with Paquito and the other senior prison guards, to avoid having him sent to the state penitentiary in Muntinlupa. This is because Kardo is already a convicted felon. However, Kardo was still sent to the state penitentiary. Once Yolly finds out, she hangs herself and her body is discovered by Angela.
- Patricia (Maritess Gutierrez) is imprisoned after causing the death of a college sorority sister in a neophyte hazing incident. On her first day, she is beaten up, similar to the first day of Angela. Angela befriends her and tries to help her. However, she is later killed by Paquito when he tries to coerce her into having sex.
- Lena suddenly finds her son imprisoned. Her son informs her that he was involved in an incident involving the death of a third person, together with his friend group. Her son is unable to give the name of the actual guilty party to the police. Lena breaks down in anger and misery, saying that she had been engaging in sex work even from jail to be able to send money to them, only for her son to find himself in jail as well. Later, her son kills one of the prison guards because he was unable to bear the humiliation that his mother was suffering. He is then taken away to the state penitentiary, to Lena’s despair.
- Juliet seduces one of the prison guards into having sex with her. She steals the prison guard’s firearm and escapes. She can take her son from the family that has taken him and is abusing him. However, she was killed when police tried to apprehend her again.
- Viring reveals that her child was fathered by a police officer who was previously assigned to the jail. After a prison riot, the child, Sarah, was later taken away from Viring and was brought to a foster home. Sarah dies in said foster home, which drives Viring insane. In a later scene, Viring is seen sharpening a spoon into a shiv. She stabs Paquito with the shiv and tries to escape. She is shot repeatedly by Paquito. Paquito tries to leave the premises but is fatally stabbed with the same shiv by Lena. Viring is later seen to have survived the gunshots inflicted on her and is in a wheelchair.

Later, Atty. Diaz (Cris Daluz), Angela's lawyer, advises her to confess to the crime she is charged with, to end the case. He tries to convince her to do so in order for the case to end quickly. He refuses to listen to Angela's explanation of what happened in the matter. Thus, contrary to her counsel’s advice, she pleads not guilty, and her case continues. Angela considers undergoing an abortion and is taken out of the prison compound to do so. However, she reconsiders. She is brought back to prison and is punished by Barbie.

After several months, Angela is in labor and is taken to the hospital to give birth. In the hospital, she escapes and meets a friend who promises to help her. She visits the man who got her pregnant, Crisanto, and plans to kill him, but decides not to. In flashbacks, it is revealed that she did not know that Crisanto was married, and was attacked by his wife, Adela (Gigette Reyes), and she defended herself against said attack. Later, she is near Manila Zoo and is spotted by the police. She hides in the zoo, but the zoo is evacuated of patrons, and a manhunt ensues to recapture her. She hides in the zoo and gives birth on her own. She begs with the police not to take her child away and pleads for mercy.

Later, Angela’s trial commences, where she is assisted by different counsel, Atty. Jacob. She is acquitted, as the prosecution was unable to prove guilt beyond reasonable doubt. She is shown with her son being baptized and the various inmates serving as the child’s godparents.

== Cast ==
- Nora Aunor as Angela Aguilar: A nightclub singer who was charged with frustrated murder
- Gina Alajar as Juliet Navarete: Angela's cellmate, who was charged with estafa and has a son
- Celia Rodriguez as Lena: A prostitute
- Perla Bautista as Viring: A woman who was imprisoned for killing her husband
- Maya Valdez as Barbie Berenguer: A lesbian prison overseer who was charged with arson
- Zenaida Amador as Tonya: The prison mayor who was charged with kidnapping
- Maritess Gutierrez as Patricia
- Gloria Romero as Patricia's mother
- Ricky Davao as Crisanto
- German Moreno as Warden Ambrocio
- Bella Flores as Olga Bella: A prison warden who receives bribes from the inmates
- Shyr Valdez as Yolly
- Tom Olivar as Paquito: A cowboy hat-wearing prison guard with evil intentions
- Augusto Victa as Warden Esteban
- Alvin Enriquez as Juliet's son
- Toby Alejar as Mike
- Gigette Reyes as Adela, Crisanto's wife
- Mandy Bustamante as Leon
- Romy Nario as Totoy
- Carmen Enriquez as Atty. Jacob
- Cris Daluz as Atty. Diaz
- Sarah Gayotin as Viring's daughter
- Edwin O'Hara as Fr. Eusebio

== Release ==
Cherubim Films released the film on December 25, 1984, and it is one of the following entries for the 10th Metro Manila Film Festival. It won six awards, including Best Picture, Best Actress, and Best Director.

=== Digital restoration ===
The restored version of the film premiered on November 11, 2019, at the Ayala Malls Manila Bay in Parañaque City as part of the Cinema One Originals film festival. It was attended by the film's surviving cast and staff members: actors Ricky Davao and Tom Olivar, film producer Cherry Cobarubbias, and former actress and now chef Maritess Gutierrez (she also represented her mother Gloria Romero), as well as the staff and crew of the ABS-CBN Film Archives, and the channel head of Cinema One, Ronald Arguelles. Actress Pinky Amador (niece of the late Zenaida Amador, who died in 2008), actress-producer Ruby Flores-Arcilla (daughter of Bella Flores, who died in 2013), and director Denise O'Hara (niece of Mario O'Hara, who died in 2012) also attended the premiere as the representatives of the cast and staff members who were deceased or unable to attend.

== Reception ==
=== Critical reception ===
Engelbert Rafferty, writing for Film Police Reviews, called the film a "classic" and praised the screenplay written by Lualhati Bautista, which she made alive and fascinated the viewers and the dramatic performances of the cast, particularly Nora Aunor for playing the character who was described as "a woman maltreated by society".

=== Awards and recognition ===
Year	Group	Category	Nominee	Result
1984	Metro Manila Film Festival	Best Picture	Bulaklak sa City Jail	Won
1984	Metro Manila Film Festival	Best Director	Mario O'Hara	Won
1984	Metro Manila Film Festival	Best Actress	Nora Aunor	Won
1984	Metro Manila Film Festival	Best Supporting Actor	Tom Olivar	Won
1984	Metro Manila Film Festival	Best Supporting Actress	Celia Rodriguez	Won
1984	Metro Manila Film Festival	Best Screenplay	Lualhati Bautista	Won
1984	Metro Manila Film Festival	Best Story	Lualhati Bautista	Won
1985	33rd FAMAS Awards	Best Actress	Nora Aunor	Won
1985	33rd FAMAS Awards	Best Supporting Actress	Perla Bautista	Won
1985	33rd FAMAS Awards	Best Picture		Nominated
1985	33rd FAMAS Awards	Best Director	Mario O'Hara	Nominated
1985	33rd FAMAS Awards	Best Screenplay	Lualhati Bautista	Nominated
1985	Gawad Urian Awards (Manunuri ng Pelikulang Pilipino)	Best Actress	Nora Aunor	Nominated
1985	Gawad Urian Awards (Manunuri ng Pelikulang Pilipino)	Best Picture		Nominated
1985	Gawad Urian Awards (Manunuri ng Pelikulang Pilipino)	Best Director	Mario O'Hara	Nominated
1985	Gawad Urian Awards (Manunuri ng Pelikulang Pilipino)	Best Supporting Actress	Perla Bautista	Nominated
1985	Gawad Urian Awards (Manunuri ng Pelikulang Pilipino)	Best Supporting Actress	Celia Rodriguez	Nominated
1985	Gawad Urian Awards (Manunuri ng Pelikulang Pilipino)	Best Screenplay	Lualhati Bautista	Nominated
1985	Gawad Urian Awards (Manunuri ng Pelikulang Pilipino)	Best Editing	Efren Jarlego	Nominated
1985	Gawad Urian Awards (Manunuri ng Pelikulang Pilipino)	Best Production Design	Tony Aguilar	Nominated
1985	Film Academy of the Philippines (Luna Awards)	Best Story Adaptation	Luhalhati Bautista	Won
1985	Film Academy of the Philippines (Luna Awards)	Best Actress	Nora Aunor	Nominated
1985	Catholic Mass Media Awards	Best Actress	Nora Aunor	Won
