= Celia Rodriguez =

Filipina actress (born 1939)

- Born: Cecilia Obsum Rodriguez; June 21, 1939 (age 87); Bulan, Sorsogon, Commonwealth of the Philippines
- Occupation: Actress
- Years active: 1957–present
- Awards: 1971 FAMAS Best Actress

Cecilia Obsum Rodriguez (born June 21, 1939) is a Filipino actress. She has been referred to as "The Original Glamorous Movie Star" for her acting prowess and longevity.

She has appeared in more than 130 movies and television shows. She won four FAMAS Awards in the films Kulay Dugo ang Gabi, The Passionate Strangers, Lilet and Magnifico. She also received an award for Best Supporting Actress in the Metro Manila Film Festival for the movie Bulaklak sa City Jail. She is referred to as the industry's "fashion maverick."

== Early life ==
Cecilia "Celia" Rodriguez was born in Bulan, Sorsogon to a Spanish-Filipino father, Angel Rodriguez, who had roots in Barcelona and a mestiza mother, Perla Obsum. She was raised in their hacienda as the second to the eldest among eight daughters. The sisters attended Colegio de la Milagrosa, a local convent school. After high school, her father sold his abaca and copra business and the family relocated to Legazpi, Albay. Rodriguez graduated at Centro Escolar University in Manila with a secretarial degree. During this time, she resided in the Santa Mesa district.

== Career ==
Rodriguez's acting skills were discovered by Adela Santiago, the head of Premiere Productions. She subsequently joined the movie industry in the late 1950s, appearing in Sa Ngalan ng Espada (1958) and Shirley, My Darling (1958). She performed in movies such as Lilet, released in 1971, Super Gee (1973), Kampanerang Kuba (1974) and Mrs. Eva Fonda, 16 (1976). Other film credits include Zoom, Zoom Superman (1973), Ang Boyfriend Kong Baduy (1975), Elektrika, Kasi Eh (1976), Star (1979), Katorse (1980), Anak (1981), Angkinin Mo Ako (1983), Ang Boyfriend Kong Kano (1983), Dapat Ka Bang Mahalin (1984), Room 69 (1984) and Bulaklak ng City Jail (1984). She was known as the antagonist Valentina in Darna movies.

Rodriguez went on an acting hiatus twice, first in the 1960s, when she worked as a fashion model in Europe, and in the 1980s and 1990s, when she resettled in the United States and at one point, took on two jobs simultaneously.

In 1999-2001 she starred in an afternoon drama called May Bukas Pa which aired on RPN 9 and IBC-13 and 2002-2003 played Cherie Gil's mother again in Bituin as Dona Virginia Gaston. Since 2004, she has starred in numerous television shows for GMA-7's and in two more incarnations of Darnas as the main villain. She was included in the GMA Network TV sitcom Who's Your Daddy Now? (2007) and the romantic-comedy series I Heart You, Pare! (2011) starring Dingdong Dantes and Regine Velasquez. In 2013, she returned to afternoon television in the highly acclaimed Magkano Ba ang Pag-ibig? with Maryo J. de los Reyes at the helm.

== Personal life ==
Rodriguez is unmarried but has three children from previous relationships, one of whom, Jackie, was her daughter with a doctor and died from an aneurysm in 1995. She describes herself as a born-again Christian since 1995.

== Awards and nominations ==
FAMAS (Filipino Academy of Movie Arts and Sciences Awards)
Year	Nominated work	Category	Result
2004	Magnifico	Best Supporting Actress	Won
1984	Ang Boyfriend kong Kano	Best Supporting Actress	Nominated
1972	Lilet	Best Actress	Won
1967	The Passionate Strangers	Best Supporting Actress	Won
1965	Blood Is The Color Of Night	Best Supporting Actress	Won

Gawad Urian
Year	Nominated work	Category	Result
2005	Magnifico	Best Supporting Actress	Nominated
1985	Bulaklak sa City Jail	Best Supporting Actress	Nominated

Luna Awards
Year	Nominated work	Category	Result
2007	Ligalig	Best Supporting Actress	Nominated

Metro Manila Film Festival
Year	Nominated work	Category	Result
2006	Magnifico	Best Actress	Nominated
1984	Bulaklak sa City Jail	Best Supporting Actress	Won

== Filmography ==
=== Television ===
Year	Title	Role
1995	Maalaala Mo Kaya: Latay	Elena
1996	Maalaala Mo Kaya: Holen	Anita
1996–1997	Familia Zaragoza	Doña Elvira
1997	Wansapanataym: Andi-Patika, Sulp-Anita, Mal-Ditas	Episode guest
1998	!Oka Tokat: Death Wish	Episode guest
1998–1999	Halik sa Apoy	Doña Tuding
1999	Pwedeng Pwede	Pearl
1999–2001	Rio Del Mar	Candida
2000–2001	May Bukas Pa	Conchita Suarez
2001–2002	Biglang Sibol, Bayang Impasibol	Nena
2002–2003	Bituin	Doña Virginia Gaston
2005	Ganda ng Lola Ko	Laura
2005	Mars Ravelo's Darna	Braguda
2005–2006	Daisy Siete: Ang Pitong Maria	Doña Asuncion Santiago
2006	Noel	
2006	Atlantika	Doña Segunda
2006–2007	Makita Ka Lang Muli	Olympia Van Helden
2007	Who's Your Daddy Now?	Mamu Candy
2007	Mga Mata ni Anghelita	Leticia Manresa / Rasfelina / Corazon
2009	Ang Babaeng Hinugot sa Aking Tadyang	Madam Laurenna Alcaraz
2009	All About Eve	Doña Concepcion Gonzales
2009	Mars Ravelo's Darna	Perfecta
2010	Sine Novela: Basahang Ginto	Doña Marina Vergara
2010	Claudine: Fraternity	
2011	I Heart You, Pare!	Marita Castillo
2011	Spooky Nights: Snow White Lady & the Seven Ghosts	Basya
2011	Iglot	Lola Idang Salvador
2012	Broken Vow	Doña Ofelia "Amorcita" Rastro
2012	Coffee Prince	Mamita Ochoa
2013	Home Sweet Home	Madame Pandora
2013	Magkano Ba ang Pag-ibig?	Doña Hilaria Buenaventura
2015	2½ Daddies	Mommy Vi
2015	Kalyeserye	Doña Celia Rodriguez viuda de Ungasis
2015–2016	Because of You	Feliza Salcedo
2017–2018	Haplos	Bettina "Lola Biring / Inang" Alonzo
2018	Dear Uge	Lola Florencia
2020	Anak ni Waray vs. Anak ni Biday	Zenaida Agpangan
2020	Dear Uge	Ima
2023–2024	Stolen Life	Corazon "Azon / Mamita" Rigor
2025	FPJ's Batang Quiapo	Doña Pilar Guerrero

=== Film ===
Year	Title	Role
1958	Shirley, My Darling	
1958	Sa Ngalan ng Espada	
1960	Hong Kong Honeymoon	
1961	Konsiyerto ng Kamatayan	
1964	Lagalag	
1965	Hong Kong 999	
1966	Wanted: Johnny L	
1971	Lilet	
1973	Zoom, Zoom, Superman!	The Spiderwoman
1974	Huwag Tularan: Pito ang Asawa Ko	
1974	Biktima	Monica Valdez
1975	Lulubog Lilitaw sa Ilalim ng Tulay	
1976	Mga Rosas sa Putikan	
1977	Maligno	
1978	Bomba Star	Estrella Montana
1979	Roberta	
1980	Aguila	Margo Cepeda
1980	Katorse	Doña Margarita Arkanghel
1980	Angela Markado	Rona
1981	Kapitan Kidlat	
1981	Bata Pa Si Sabel	Doña Raymunda
1981	Bakit Ba Ganyan?	Mrs. del Oro
1982	Mother Dear	Nilda
1982	Palengke Queen	Doña Carmela
1982	Diary of Cristina Gaston	Donya Madonna
1983	Angkinin Mo Ako	
1984	Bagets	Adie's mother
1984	Bulaklak sa City Jail	Luna
1984	14 Going Steady	Miss Victoria Imaculata
1985	Sanay	Elisa
1996	Tukso Layuan Mo Ako 2	
1997	Lihim Ni Madonna	Viring
1997	Ikaw Pala ang Mahal Ko	Corinne Balmaceda
1998	Kahit Saan... Kung Puwede	
1999	Bullet	Flor
2003	Magnifico	Ka Doring
2004	Naglalayag	Mrs. Roces
2006	Ligalig	Martha
2009	Tarot	Lola Nena
2009	Fuchsia	Priscilla
2010	I'll Be There	Madam Conching Collins
2011	Shake, Rattle & Roll 13	Aling Epang
2012	Thy Womb	
2012	My Kontrabida Girl	
2025	Mudrasta: Ang Beking Ina!	Doña Evita
2025	Kontrabida Academy	History Teacher
