= Tita Muñoz =

Filipina actress (1926?–2009)

- Born: Maria Theresa Sanchez Muñoz; 1927
- Died: April 11, 2009 (aged 81–82)
- Occupation: Actress
- Years active: 1950–2003

Maria Theresa "Tita" Sanchez Muñoz (1926/27 – April 11, 2009) was a Filipina actress. Muñoz started her career in radio in the 1950s. She moved to Sampaguita Pictures where she played mostly character roles. She received a FAMAS Best Supporting Actress nomination, for Lilet (1971). During the 1960s, Muñoz and Ronald Remy became the first actors to ever kiss on Philippine television.

In 1990, Muñoz portrayed the mother of Leslie Cheung's character in Wong Kar-wai's Days of Being Wild.

== Personal life ==
Tita is survived by brothers Rafael and Cayetano, sisters-in-law, nieces and nephews including the Muñoz actor-brothers Leandro, Carlo and Angelo (sons of Tita's late younger brother Louie) who are now based in the United States.

== Death ==
Muñoz suffered from health problems in her later years and died from heart failure on April 11, 2009, in Parañaque, Metro Manila. Her remains have been cremated. The wake was held at the Sampaguita Chapel of the Funeraria Paz at the Manila Memorial Park in Sucat, Parañaque, until Tuesday, April 14. A necrological Mass was held at 7:00 p.m.

== Filmography ==
=== Film ===
- Tulisang Pugot (1951)
- Kasaysayan ni Rudy Concepcion (1952)
- Texas (Ang Manok Na Nagsasalita) (1952)
- Ang Pagsilang ng Mesiyas (1952)
- El Indio (1953)
- Flight of the Sparrow (1966)
- Operation: Discotheque (1967)
- Cover Girls (1967)
- Suicide Seven (1967)
- Blackhawk Commandos (1968)
- Pussy Cat (1969)
- Santa Teresa de Avila (1970)
- The Evil Within (1970)
- Now! (1971)
- Stardoom (1971)
- Lilet (1971)
- Paru-parong Itim (1973)
- Dalawang Muka ng Tagumpay (1973)
- Daigdig ng Sindak at Lagim (1974)
- Sugat sa Ugat (1983)
- Muntinlupa 1958 (1984)
- Balimbing (Mga Taong Hunyango) (1986)
- Pahiram ng Isang Umaga (1989)
- Days of Being Wild (1990)
- Inay (1993)
- Madrasta (1996)

=== Television ===
- Trianggulo (1987)
- The Maricel Drama Special: "May Mata ang Puso" (1990)
- Sana ay Ikaw na Nga as Doña Amparo Zalameda (2001–2003)
