= The Girl Most Likely =

1957 film by Mitchell Leisen

- theatrical release poster
- Directed by: Mitchell Leisen
- Written by: Paul Jarrico; Devery Freeman
- Produced by: Stanley Rubin
- Starring: Jane Powell; Cliff Robertson; Keith Andes; Kaye Ballard; Tommy Noonan; Una Merkel
- Cinematography: Robert H. Planck
- Edited by: Doane Harrison; Harry Marker
- Music by: Nelson Riddle; Bob Russell; Hugh Martin; Ralph Blane
- Distributed by: RKO Radio Pictures; Universal Pictures
- Release date: February 1958 (US)
- Running time: 98 minutes
- Country: United States
- Language: English

The Girl Most Likely is a 1958 American musical comedy film about a young woman who becomes engaged to three men at the same time. The film, a remake of Tom, Dick and Harry (1941), was directed by Mitchell Leisen, and stars Jane Powell, Cliff Robertson, and Keith Andes. The choreography is by Gower Champion.

This was the last film produced by RKO Radio Pictures and was distributed by Universal Pictures. It was also the final film directed by Leisen.

== Plot ==
Dodie lives with her parents and dreams of marrying a millionaire. At home in California, near the ocean, her boyfriend Buzz is a real-estate agent of modest means. He proposes marriage and she accepts, but tells her pal Marge that she has doubts.

A yacht arrives, owned by wealthy Neil Patterson, which gets Dodie's fantasies going. She leaps into the water and swims to meet him. Asked on a date, Dodie is thrilled until she learns that the man isn't Neil at all but Pete, his poor mechanic.

It isn't long before Pete is smitten and proposes. He also infuriates Buzz by pretending to buy a house and bringing Dodie along as his fiancée.

A drunk Neil has an accidental meeting with Dodie and invites her onto the yacht. At first, she's annoyed by his advances, but in Tijuana, she gets tipsy and has a great time. Neil is the rich suitor of her dreams, one who even buys a taxi rather than just hailing a ride from one.

After being out till 4 a.m., Dodie is brought home by Neil, only to find Buzz and Pete impatiently waiting on her doorstep. Asking time to sleep on a decision, Dodie tells them the next morning that she has made her choice: Neil.

The guys reluctantly accept, and Dodie goes off with her new betrothed. But the minute Pete kisses her goodbye, she promptly changes her mind.

== Cast ==
- Jane Powell as Dodie
- Cliff Robertson as Pete
- Keith Andes as Neil Patterson Jr.
- Kaye Ballard as Marge
- Tommy Noonan as Buzz
- Una Merkel as Mother
- Kelly Brown as Sam Kelsey
- Judy Nugent as Pauline
- Frank Cady as Pop
- Joseph Kearns as Mr. Schlom, Bank Manager

== Soundtrack ==
- "The Girl Most Likely"
  - Music by Nelson Riddle
  - Lyrics by Bob Russell
  - Sung over the opening credits by The Hi-Los
- "I Don't Know What I Want"
  - Written by Hugh Martin and Ralph Blane
  - Sung by Jane Powell
- "We Gotta Keep Up with the Joneses"
  - Written by Hugh Martin and Ralph Blane
  - Sung by Jane Powell and Tommy Noonan (dubbed by Robert C. Oates)
- "Travelogue"
  - Written by Hugh Martin and Ralph Blane
  - Sung by Jane Powell, Cliff Robertson (dubbed by Hal Derwin), Kaye Ballard, Kelly Brown and Ensemble
- "Balboa"
  - Written by Hugh Martin and Ralph Blane
  - Sung and danced by Jane Powell and Ensemble
- "Crazy Horse"
  - Written by Hugh Martin and Ralph Blane
  - Sung and danced by Jane Powell and Children's Chorus
- "All the Colors of the Rainbow"
  - Written by Hugh Martin and Ralph Blane
  - Sung and danced by Jane Powell, Keith Andes, Kaye Ballard, Kelly Brown and Ensemble

== Production notes ==
The Girl Most Likely was a remake of the 1941 RKO picture Tom, Dick and Harry. RKO produced the film in 1956, but after the breakup of the studio, Universal bought the release rights.

Jane Powell had been under contract to MGM for 14 years until November 1955. She signed a three-picture deal with MGM. In February 1956, she signed a three-picture deal with RKO, the first film which was to be The Girl Most Likely.

Carol Channing, who was under contract to RKO to make 10 films over five years (she had already made The First Traveling Saleslady), signed to costar along with Ralph Meeker.

In July 1956, Gower Champion signed to do the choreography.

In August, Tom Noonan and Keith Andes signed to costar and Mitchell Leisen to direct. Channing refused to do the film, unhappy with her role. RKO released her from her contract, and she was replaced by Kaye Ballard.

Meeker dropped out, and Cliff Robertson was borrowed from Columbia.

Filming took place from early September to early November 1956; additional scenes were shot the week of 8 Jan 1957.

== Release ==
The film was completed by November 1956 but not released until November 1958. Producer Stanley Rubin later said the film "is really an orphan. Her father, RKO, died; her mother, U-I (which is releasing), is in a coma. The little girl is having to fend for itself."

RKO meant to follow it up with Tempo starring Marge and Gower Champion, but it never was made.

== See also ==
- List of American films of 1957
