= 1972 FAMAS Awards =

Filipino Award for Arts and Sciences in 1972

20th FAMAS Awards
- Date: 1972
- Site: Philippines

Highlights
- Best Picture: Lilet (Velarde and Associates Productions)
- Most awards: Lilet (Velarde and Associates Productions) (6 wins)

The 20th Filipino Academy of Movie Arts and Sciences Awards Night was held in 1972 for the Outstanding Achievements for the year 1971.

Lilet, a Velarde and Associates production, won the most awards with 6 wins including the FAMAS Award for Best Picture and Best Actress for Celia Rodriguez.

== Awards ==
=== Major Awards ===
Winners are listed first and highlighted with boldface.

Best Picture	Best Director
**Lilet — Velarde and Associates Productions**; Asedillo — FPJ Productions; Hukom Bitay — Trans-Asia Films; Lumuha pati mga Anghel — Lea Productions; Nympha — Joy Productions; Pagdating sa Dulo — Frankesa Productions; Ang Uliran — Premiere Productions	**Gerardo de Leon — Lilet**; Arsenio Bautista — Hukom Bitay; Emmanuel H. Borlaza — I Love Mama, I Love Papa; Celso Ad. Castillo — Nympha; Ishmael Bernal — Pagdating sa Dulo; Lino Brocka — Stardoom; Augusto Buenaventura — Ang Uliran
Best Actor	Best Actress
**Fernando Poe Jr. — Asedillo**; Romy Diaz — Buhay na Manika; Joseph Estrada — Hukom Bitay; Tony Ferrer — I Love Mama, I Love Papa; Eddie Garcia — Lumuluha pati mga Anghel; Dindo Fernando — Ang Uliran; Ray Marcos — Verde	**Celia Rodriguez — Lilet**; Rosemarie Sonora — Cadena de Amor; Boots Anson-Roa — I Love Mama, I Love Papa; Riza — Nympha; Rita Gomez — Pagdating sa Dulo; Amalia Fuentes — Divina Bastarda; Lolita Rodriguez — Stardoom
Best Supporting Actor	Best Supporting Actress
**Max Alvarado — Ang kampana sa Santa Quiteria**; Jerry Lerma — Hukom Bitay; Joe Sison — Hukom Bitay; Vic Silayan — Lilet; Ronaldo Valdez — Lumuha pati mga anghel; Eddie Garcia — Pagdating sa Dulo; Mario O'Hara — Stardoom	**Marissa Delgado — Lumuha pati mga Anghel**; Rosanna Ortiz — Ang kampana sa Santa Quiteria; Paraluman — Lilet; Tita Muñoz — Lilet; Caridad Sanchez — Stardoom; Zenaida Amador — Pagdating sa Dulo
Best Child Actor	Best Child Actress
**Arnold Gamboa — Lumuha pati mga Anghel**	**Lorna Tolentino — Lumuha pati mga Anghel**
Best in Screenplay	Best Story
**Ishmael Bernal — Pagdating sa Dulo**	**Arsenio Bautista — Hukom bitay**
Best Sound	Best Musical Score
**Angel Avellana — Asedillo**	**Tito Arevalo — Lilet**
Best Cinematography (black and White)	Best Cinematography (Colored)
**Loreto Isleta — Nympha**	**Justo Paulino — Lilet**
Best Editing	Best Theme Song
**Teofilo de Leon— Lilet**	**Victor Laurel — Imelda: Ang Uliran**

=== Special Awardees ===
- **Dr. Ciriaco Santiago Memorial Award**
  - **Atty. Espiridion Laxa**

- **Gregorio Valdez Memorial Award**
  - **Joseph Estrada**
