= Keith Andes =

American actor (1920–2005)

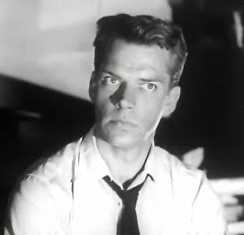
- Andes in the 1953 movie Split Second
- Born: John Charles Andes; July 12, 1920; Ocean City, New Jersey, U.S.
- Died: November 11, 2005 (aged 85); Newhall, California, U.S.
- Education: Temple University (Bachelor of Education)
- Occupation: Actor
- Years active: 1932–1980
- Spouses: Jean Alice Cotton (m. 1946; div. 1961); Shelah Hackett (m. 1961; div. 19??)
- Children: 2, including Mark Andes
- Military career
- Allegiance: United States
- Branch: United States Army Air Forces
- Conflicts: World War II

Keith Andes (born John Charles Andes, July 12, 1920 – November 11, 2005) was an American actor. He is known for films such as Blackbeard the Pirate (1952) and Clash by Night (1952).

== Early life ==
Andes was born to William Gardner Andes (1889–1964) and Elsie S. Andes (née Metzger, 1889–1972) in Ocean City, New Jersey. By the age of 12, he was featured on the radio.

He attended St Edward's School in Oxford, England, and graduated from Temple University in Philadelphia in 1943 with a bachelor's degree in education. While at Temple, he was a member of Sigma Pi fraternity, and did not participate in the university's theater program. Instead, he spent his time working as a disc jockey for several Philadelphia-area radio stations, including KYW, WFIL, and WIP.

== Career ==
=== Early performances ===
Andes began his acting career while serving in the United States Army Air Forces during World War II. He served three years and sang and acted in United Service Organization shows. He was cast in the play Winged Victory and then cast by 20th Century Fox in the film Winged Victory (1944).

In 1947, Andes received a Theater World Award for his Broadway debut performance in a revival of the operetta The Chocolate Soldier.

In 1947, he had a role in the movie The Farmer's Daughter, the film that won Loretta Young her Best Actress Oscar. Andes, Lex Barker and James Arness played the title character's powerfully built and highly protective brothers.

Andes's first leading role in a feature film came with Project X (1949), a low-budget, independent movie.

In June 1950, he joined the cast of Kiss Me, Kate on Broadway, taking over the lead from Alfred Drake, starring in the show for over a year, in New York and on tour. This re-ignited Hollywood's interest in him.

=== RKO and Universal ===
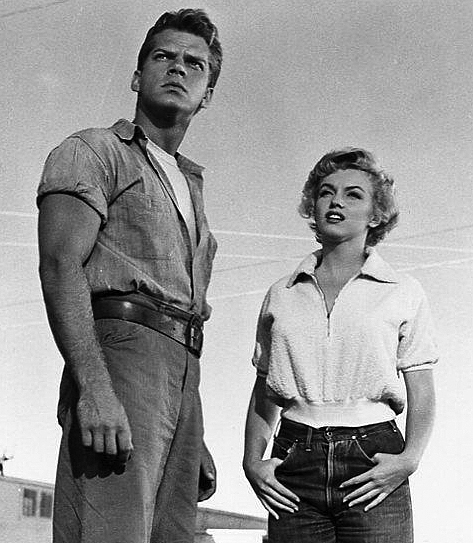
Andes with Marilyn Monroe in Clash by Night

Andes appeared as Marilyn Monroe's sweetheart and Barbara Stanwyck's brother in the film Clash by Night (1952), directed by Fritz Lang and co-written by Clifford Odets, for RKO.

Also for that studio, he played the heroic Lt. Maynard in Blackbeard, the Pirate (1952) and a supporting role in Split Second (1953).

In 1953, he starred in a short-lived Broadway musical, Maggie.

In 1954, he signed a new contract with RKO even though that studio had kept him idle for a year, causing him to miss a part in The High and the Mighty. He was under contract to RKO for three years.

He co-starred with Angela Lansbury in the film noir A Life at Stake (1954) and was one of several male leads in The Second Greatest Sex (1955) at Universal, where he signed a long-term contract.

Andes begin guest starring on TV shows like Celebrity Playhouse, The Ford Television Theatre, Matinee Theatre, The Loretta Young Show, Conflict and Playhouse 90. He also starred in TV adaptations of The Great Waltz (playing Johann Strauss, Jr.), Bloomer Girl (1956) and Holiday (based on The Grand Tour) (1956).

He made two films with Jeff Chandler at Universal, Away All Boats (1956) and Pillars of the Sky (1956) and did Back from Eternity (1956) at RKO. In 1956, he starred in a pilot for the series Doctor Mike, that was not picked up.

At Universal, he had a role in Interlude (1957), then he appeared in The Girl Most Likely (1958), the last film made by RKO.

Andes guest starred on Jane Wyman Presents The Fireside Theatre, Goodyear Theatre, Alcoa Theatre and The Gale Storm Show: Oh! Susanna.

In 1958, Andes starred as crusading former Louisiana State Police Superintendent Francis Grevemberg in the film Damn Citizen at Universal.

He starred in two low-budget features: Model for Murder (1959) in England and Surrender - Hell! (1960) in the Philippines.

=== Television ===
Andes was cast in a regular series, playing Frank Dawson in the police drama This Man Dawson (1959–60), the story of a former United States Marine Corps colonel who is hired to stop police corruption in a large, unnamed city.

On Broadway, Andes starred opposite Lucille Ball in the musical Wildcat (1960–61) which ran for 175 performances.

When Wildcat ended Andes resumed his television career, guest starring on Sea Hunt, Have Gun - Will Travel, Follow the Sun, Vacation Playhouse and The Rifleman.

In 1963, Andes was cast in the episode "Firebug" of the anthology series GE True, hosted by Jack Webb. In the story line, Victor Buono portrays Charles Colvin, a barber in Los Angeles, who is by night a pyromaniac. The United States Forest Service works to find Colvin before he can set more fires.

Later in 1963, Andes was cast in a regular role as the lawyer-husband on the 1963 sitcom Glynis, starring Glynis Johns as his wife, a mystery writer and amateur sleuth. In 1964 Andes played Professor Peter Wayne in the "Expanding Human" episode of the second season of Outer Limits.

He had a notable guest star appearance in Star Trek in 1967 as Akuta in "The Apple."

He guest-starred on 77 Sunset Strip, Perry Mason (in the episodes "The Case of the Skeleton's Closet" and "The Case of the Illicit Illusion"), Mickey Rooney's short-lived sitcom Mickey, The Littlest Hobo, Death Valley Days, The Outer Limits, Valentine's Day, Branded, The Lucy Show and Run for Your Life.

Andes starred as the manager of a radio station in the serial Paradise Bay, which debuted September 27, 1965.

He returned to guest-star roles in Daniel Boone, The Andy Griffith Show and I Spy.

His work included voice acting in the animated Birdman and the Galaxy Trio (1967) as Birdman. In 1967, he toured in a production of Man of La Mancha.

=== Later career ===
He appeared as General George C. Marshall in the film Tora! Tora! Tora! and in the biker movie Hell's Bloody Devils (1970).

He guest-starred on Petticoat Junction, The Bold Ones: The New Doctors, Dan August, The Streets of San Francisco, Search, Gunsmoke, Cannon, Caribe and The Magical World of Disney ("Twister, Bull from the Sky").

His later appearances included the films ...And Justice for All (1979) and The Ultimate Impostor (1979) as well as playing Minister Darius in the Buck Rogers in the 25th Century episode "Buck's Duel to the Death".

Following his final appearance in the TV movie Blinded by the Light (1980), he retired. He later said "I was divorced, my kids were grown and that is when I bought a boat and lived on it and ran charters on it over to Catalina and down to Mexico and back. I just had a ball."

== Personal life ==
On November 30, 1946, Andes married nurse Jean A. Cotton in Upper Darby Township, Pennsylvania. The couple divorced in 1961. They had two sons: musicians Mark (in bands Spirit, Jo Jo Gunne, Firefall and Heart) and Matt (also a member of Spirit and Jo Jo Gunne).

In 1961, he married Sheila Hackett during a break in Wildcat.

== Death ==
On November 11, 2005, Andes was found dead at his home in Santa Clarita, California. He was 85. He had been suffering from bladder cancer and other ailments (he had been a smoker). His death was ruled as suicide by asphyxiation according to a report from the Los Angeles County Coroner's Office.

== Filmography ==
Year	Title	Role	Notes
1944	Winged Victory	Flyer	Uncredited
1947	The Farmer's Daughter	Sven Holstrom	
1949	Project X	Steve Monahan	
1952	Clash by Night	Joe Doyle	
1952	Blackbeard the Pirate	Robert Maynard	
1953	Split Second	Larry Fleming	
1954	A Life at Stake	Edward Shaw	
1955	The Second Greatest Sex	Rev. Peter Maxwell	
1956	Away All Boats	Doctor Bell	
1956	Back from Eternity	Joe Brooks	
1956	Pillars of the Sky	Capt. Tom Gaxton	
1957	Interlude	Dr. Morley Dwyer	
1957	The Girl Most Likely	Neil Patterson, Jr.	
1957	Turn of Fate	David Cramer	ep29 - The Lady Takes A Stand
1958	Damn Citizen	Col. Francis C. Grevemberg	
1959	Model for Murder	David Martens	
1959	Surrender - Hell!	Col. Donald D. Blackburn	
1961	Sea Hunt	Todd Webster	Season 4, Episode 37
1962	The Rifleman	Reynolds	Season 4, Episode 23
1964	The Tattooed Police Horse	Narrator	Voice
1964	Perry Mason	Dr. Young	Season 7, Episode 25
1967	Star Trek	Akuta	Episode: "The Apple"
1970	Hell's Bloody Devils	Joe Brimante	
1970	Tora! Tora! Tora!	General George C. Marshall	
1979	...And Justice for All	Marvin Bates	
