= List of crossword designers =

A game designer is a person who invents games at the conceptual level. Crossword designers are also known as crossword compilers, cruciverbalists, crossword writers, crossword constructors, or crossword setters. The following is a list of notable crossword designers.

Designer	Notable work	Honors	Ref.
Erik Agard	crossword puzzle creator for the Los Angeles Times and The New York Times; crossword editor of USA Today		
David Astle	creates crossword puzzles under the pseudonym DA for The Age and The Sydney Morning Herald		
Adrian Bell	first compiler of The Times crossword		
Tracy Bennett	edits The New York Times Games products Wordle and Strands		
Jacques Bens	head of crosswords for L'Express and Lire		
Patrick Berry	crossword puzzle creator for the The New York Times, The New Yorker, and Harper's Magazine	Merl Reagle MEmoRiaL Award	
Harold T. Bers	crossword creator for The Atlanta Constitution, The Washington Post, and the New York Herald-Tribune; credited with inventing the themed crossword puzzle while working for The New York Times	Crossword Puzzle Hall of Fame	
Seth Bisen-Hersh	contributor for The New York Times crossword		
Joyce Cansfield	crossword setter for The Times and crossword compiler The Listener. under the pseudonym Machiavelli		
Alan Connor	crossword editor for The Guardian and sets the Everyman cryptic crossword for The Observer		
Nuala Considine	crossword compiler for The Irish Times, The Daily Telegraph, The Spectator, Financial Times, Woman's Realm, The Washington Post, and New Scientist		
Emily Cox	wrote a monthly cryptic crossword with her husband Henry Rathvon for The Atlantic and The Wall Street Journal under the pseudonym Hex		
Ruth Crisp	compiled crosswords for The Guardian under the names Crispa and Vixen		
Jonathan Crowther	crossword puzzle setter for The Observer with the pseudonym Azed		
John Derek Crozier	compiler of the cryptic crossword in The Irish Times, with the pseudonym Crosaire		
Leonard Dawe	crossword compiler for The Daily Telegraph		
Colin Dexter	crosswords for The Oxford Times		
Tom Driberg	compiler of a regular, highly risqué cryptic crossword puzzle for Private Eye as Tiresias		
Jacques Drillon	head of the crossword section of Le Nouvel Observateur		
Roy Earle	compiler of a cryptic crossword published daily in The Irish Times under the pseudonym Mac An Iarla		
Sam Ezersky	crossword constructor for the New York Times games department		
Joel Fagliano	compiler of the Mini Crossword and The New York Times crossword		
Margaret Farrar	first crossword puzzle editor for The New York Times and editor of crossword books	Crossword Puzzle Hall of Fame	
Jeremiah Farrell	contributor to The New York Times crossword		
John Finnemore	created cryptic crosswords under the pseudonym Emu for The Listener and The Times		
Vic Fleming	created crosswords for numerous publications and also I Swear puzzles book		
Matt Gaffney	created crosswords for Billboard, Chicago Tribune, The Daily Beast GAMES magazine, Los Angeles Times, and The New York Times		
Mangesh Ghogre	created crossword puzzles published in The New York Times, The Wall Street Journal, and Los Angeles Times		
Walter B. Gibson	created crossword puzzles for Philadelphia publications		
Bernice Gordon	created crossword puzzles for the The New York Times and Los Angeles Times		
Dave Gorman	cryptic crosswords setter for The Independent as Bluth, The Daily Telegraph as Django, and The Guardian as Fed		
John Galbraith Graham	cryptic crossword compiler for The Guardian under the pseudonym Araucaria		
Paul Green	created around 300 CommuniCrostics crosswords for the IEEE Communications Magazine		
Barbara Hall	crosswords puzzles editor for The Sunday Times; also created and set puzzles for the Daily Mail, The Yorkshire Post, and The Observer		
John Halpern	cryptic crossword compiler for The Guardian, The Independent, The Times, The Daily Telegraph, and Financial Times		
Sarah Hayes	crossword and advanced cryptics creator associated with The Daily Telegraph, The Guardian, The Independent, New Statesman, Financial Times, and The Times, using the names Anarche, Aranya, and Rosa		
Francis Heaney	puzzle writer and editor-at-large for GAMES Magazine		
Tyler Hinman	crossword contributor to the The New York Times and The Onion		
Henry Hook	created crosswords and cryptics for Games and was a crossword creator for King Features Syndicate, The New York Times, and The Boston Globe Sunday edition		
Helene Hovanec	crossword puzzle book writer for children		
Margaret Irvine	set cryptic crosswords for The Guardian under the pseudonym Nutmeg		
Maura Jacobson	contributed weekly to The New York Times crossword for 31 years		
Daniel Larsen	constructed crossword puzzles for The New York Times when he was thirteen years old		
Wendy Law	set cryptic crosswords for The Guardian and the Financial Times		
Frank W. Lewis	created weekly crossword for The Nation for fifty years		
Wyna Liu	crossword creator and editor of The New York Times Connections		
Aimee Lucido	crossword constructor and editor for The New York Times crossword		
William Lutwiniak	crossword co-editor of The Washington Post magazine and contributor to the New York Herald Tribune		
Derrick Somerset Macnutt	crossword contributor to The Observer under the pseudonym Ximenes		
Eugene T. Maleska	crossword puzzle constructor who edited The New York Times crossword		
Don Manley	crossword contributor to The Guardian and crossword editor of Church Times, under the pseudonyms Bradman, Duck, Giovanni, and Quixote		
Edward Powys Mathers	pioneer of the cryptic crossword; created crossword for The Observer as Torquemada		
Andrea Carla Michaels	contributor for The New York Times crossword		
Jeremy Morse	writer of cryptic crossword clues for The Observer and word puzzles for Word Ways: The Journal of Recreational Linguistics		
Stanley Newman	editor of the Newsday crossword puzzle		
Manny Nosowsky	crossword contributor to The New York Times, the Wall Street Journal		
Juan Ostoic	wrote crossword puzzles for La Tercera using the pseudonym Jota O		
Trip Payne	crossword contributing editor to Games World of Puzzles		
Georges Perec	created crossword-puzzles for Le Point		
John Pidgeon	crossword compiler for the The Daily Telegraph under the pseudonym Petitjean		
Brendan Emmett Quigley	created crossword for The New York Times, The Washington Post, The Wall Street Journal, and The Boston Globe		
A. N. Prahlada Rao	Kannada-language crossword compiler		
Henry Rathvon	wrote a monthly cryptic crossword with his wife Emily Cox for The Atlantic and The Wall Street Journal under the pseudonym Hex		
Merl Reagle	crossword constructor for the San Francisco Chronicle; syndicated in more than fifty papers		
Alistair Ferguson Ritchie	crossword compiler for in The Sketch and The Listener, under the pseudonym Afrit		
Anna Shechtman	constructs crossword puzzles for The New Yorker and The New York Times		
Mike Shenk	crosswood puzzle editor of The Wall Street Journal		
Will Shortz	puzzle designer for The New York Times crossword	Sam Loyd Award	
Evelyn E. Smith	crossword compiler		
Bob Smithies	compiler of cryptic crossword for The Guardian under the pseudonym Bunthorne		
Stephen Sondheim	credited with introducing British cryptic crosswords to the US through a series he created for New York magazine, later consolidated as Stephen Sondheim's Crossword Puzzles		
Roger Squires	recognised by Guinness World Records as "The World's Most Prolific Crossword Compiler"; crossword editor at the Birmingham Post; and crossword compiler for The Daily Telegraph, The Times, The Guardian, The Sun, and The Financial Times, using the pseudonyms Bower, Dante, Hodge, Icarus, and Rufus		
David Steinberg	editor of the Universal Crossword, a daily puzzle published by Andrews McMeel Syndication; former crossword constructor for The New York Times and Los Angeles Times		
Benjamin Tatar	created crossword puzzles for Dell Publishing		
Jan Buckner Walker	creator of the Tribune Media Services' Kids Across Parents Down family crossword		
Will Weng	crossword puzzle editor for The New York Times		
Arthur Wynne	Invented the modern crossword puzzle while working for the New York World	Crossword Puzzle Hall of Fame	

== See also ==
- List of game designers
