= Wendy Law =

British crossword compiler (1960–2026)

Wendy Anne Law (29 July 1960 – 4 June 2026) was a British crossword compiler and librarian. She created cryptic crosswords for The Guardian under the pseudonym Hectence, creating 217 crosswords over 27 years, and for The Financial Times under the pseudonym Zamorca. She was the most prolific setter for The Guardian's 'Quiptic' puzzle and, at the time of her death, was the only setter to have appeared every year.

== Early life and career ==
Law was born on 29 July 1960 in Manchester to Derek Sherwin and his wife Pat (nee Smethurst). Her father worked as a chemist and the family moved to Melton Mowbray for his work. Her mother would do a cryptic crossword every day from the Daily Mail and later the Daily Telegraph and Sunday Times. Law and her father would help her mother when she got stuck. Law attended King Edward VII School and then Leeds University. She first studied art history before changing to study English and Italian and graduated in 1982.

Law worked in administrative jobs at the Ministry of Agriculture and the Official Receiver, before starting to work for South Cambridgeshire district council in education finance. As part of the council's professional development, she chose to become a librarian and worked at the library in Willingham from 1999. She commented that she "[ended] up where [she] should have started, in libraries." Law continued to work there, becoming the manager of five village libraries, before her retirement in 2019.

== Puzzle compiling ==
Law started making crosswords for her parents to solve. In 1998, she sent one of her cryptic crosswords to Hugh Stephenson, the crossword editor at The Guardian, and upon receiving a reply that they would "keep it on file", took it to be a rejection. However, the next year, Stephenson used her submitted crossword as the fourth installment of the 'Quiptic' crossword, a puzzle to encourage solvers of the quick crossword to try solving cryptics. Her first crossword for the Financial Times was published in 2019.

Law was known for her accessible setting, describing her puzzles as "the easiest end of the cryptic crossword difficulty scale." She noted Araucaria, Crispa, Arachne and Nutmeg as among her favourite setters.

She also set crosswords, codewords and sudokus for her village magazine, the Willingham News, of which she was a volunteer editor.

=== Pseudonyms ===
Law's Guardian pseudonym 'Hectence' came from her imaginary friends as a child, Potence and Hectence. According to Law, Hectence "was quite a mischievous character." Her Financial Times pseudonym 'Zamorca' comes from the Bosnian for 'guinea pig'; Law kept guinea pigs and had looked up their name in lots of different languages, choosing Bosnian because "Zamorca sounded a bit dangerous!"

== Personal life and death ==
Law met her husband Derek Law at university where they solved crosswords from the Leeds University student newspaper together. The couple married in 1982 and had two daughters. She was a Manchester City F.C. fan and a cinephile.

Law was diagnosed with cancer in 2019, prompting her retirement. She died on 4 June 2026.
