= Roger Squires =

British crossword compiler (1932–2023)

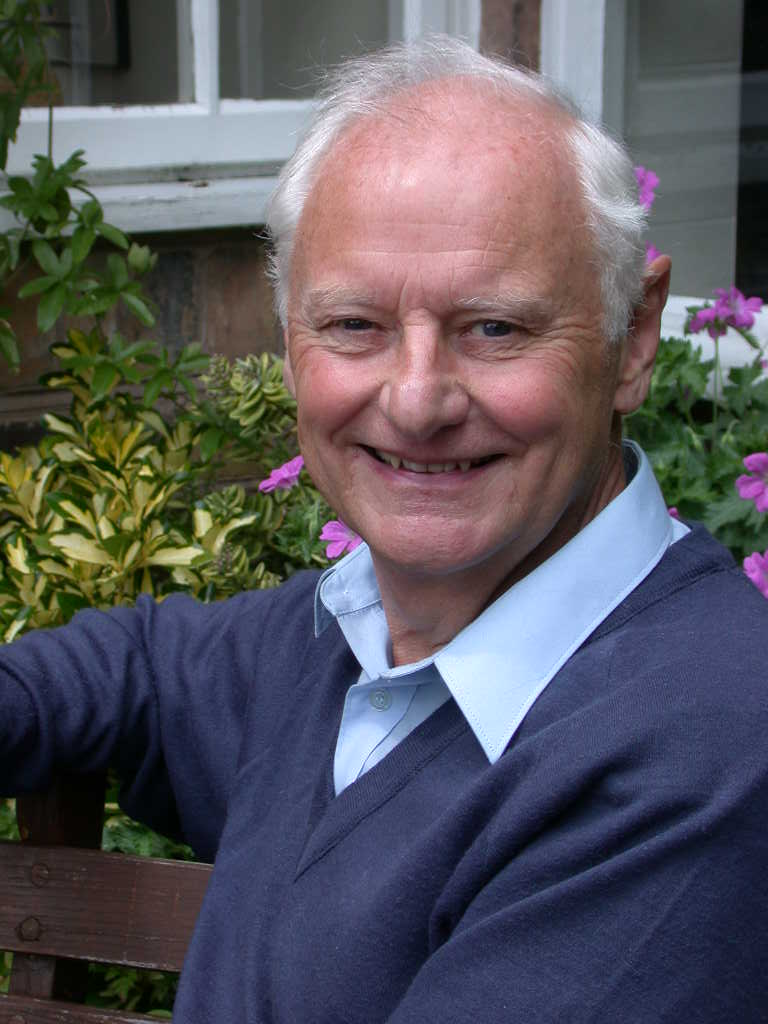
Squires in 2005

Roger Squires (22 February 1932 – 1 June 2023) was a British crossword compiler/setter, who lived in Ironbridge, Shropshire. He was best known for being the world's most prolific compiler. He compiled under the pseudonym Rufus in The Guardian, Dante in The Financial Times and was the Monday setter for the Daily Telegraph.

== Early life ==
Squires was born in Tettenhall, Wolverhampton on 22 February 1932. educated at Wolverhampton Grammar School where he gained his School Certificate before joining the Royal Navy at age 15 as a Boy Seaman.

Squires served 15 years in the Fleet Air Arm, in which he trained as an observer and gained commission as its youngest ever officer and visited 44 countries, including being in the first aircraft to land in Port Said in the 1956 Suez Crisis. In March 1961 he survived an aircraft crash in the Indian Ocean off the coast of Ceylon, escaping from his Gannet AEW 60 feet below the sea surface and qualifying to become a member of the Goldfish Club (for survivors of aircraft ditchings).

Squires wrote, produced and appeared in a number of shows for the forces during his service. A keen sportsman, Squires represented the Royal Navy and Fleet Air Arm at football and cricket and became a qualified Football Association Coach and Referee.

His first published puzzle appeared in 1963, the year that he left the Navy and briefly worked as an entertainments manager for Butlin's, in the Wolverhampton Express & Star. The first national was the Radio Times, and in the same year he became a regular compiler with the Birmingham Post. He then started compiling for syndicates that supplied puzzles for newspapers in the UK and abroad.

== Career ==
In 1981 Squires joined The Guardian, the Times Educational Supplement,"The Glasgow Herald" and Financial Times and became the Birmingham Post crossword editor for 22 years. In 1986 he joined the Daily Telegraph and The Independent. He compiled for The Sun (1992–1998), The Times (1993–2005) and the Times Educational Supplement (1981–2006). He has set crosswords under pseudonyms including Rufus, Dante, Icarus, Hodge and Bower.

In 1990 he captained the Great Britain crossword team in the 12 nation International Crossword Marathon in Bjelovar, Yugoslavia.

He registered his company name of "Cryptic Crosswords" in the early 1970s.

Squires published over 70,000 crosswords in total, and on 14 May 2007 what was estimated to be his two millionth clue was published in the Daily Telegraph. The clue was 'Two girls, one on each knee (7)'.

He was recognised by Guinness World Records as "The World's Most Prolific Crossword Compiler". He appeared in the Guinness Book of Records from 1978 until all crossword records were dropped in 2002. An update to December 2005 was included in the 2008 print edition.

His puzzles appeared in 32 countries outside the UK. In 2013, he celebrated his 50th year as a professional setter, on the same day as the Crossword's First Centenary. By 30 June 2013 he had compiled 74,634 crosswords, equivalent to 2.25 million clues. He holds the record for the longest word used in a published puzzle, the Welsh place name: Llanfairpwllgwyngyllgogerychwyrndrobwllllantysiliogogogoch, which he clued as an anagram: "Giggling troll follows Clancy, Larry, Billy and Peggy who howl, wrongly disturbing a place in Wales (58)". He is one of only four setters to have been on the regular teams of all five quality newspapers (The Times, Daily Telegraph, The Guardian, The Independent and Financial Times). He holds the Guinness Record for the Longest Published Crossword – at 8 feet long, because Onsworld Ltd were unable to publish the whole 24 ft puzzle. He has also produced a 3D crossword that fits on a Rubik's Cube.

== Publications ==
Many crossword anthologies, including The Times, Guardian, Telegraph, Financial Times, and the Herald include cryptic puzzles by Squires, including one book devoted solely to 100 of his Guardian cryptics. In collaboration with Ken Guy he produced three general knowledge books on "The 1950s", "The 1960s" and "The 1970s".

Squires was featured in a number of crossword books about Squires' inclusion in "A Display of Lights (9)".

In 2000 the Times Educational Supplement published an article titled "Clued up" in which he was interviewed.

== Other various appearances ==
Apart from crosswords, Squires was qualified for membership of Mensa and The Magic Circle.

From 1964 to 1977 he made over 250 appearances on TV as a comedy magician.

Squires was featured talking about crosswords in the TV programme How To Solve Cryptic Crosswords (BBC4) in 2009, and in the BBC One Show (BBC1) in 2011. Aside from crossword-related matters, he did a three months' stint appearing in bit parts in the ITV series Crossroads and also appeared on BBC TV in Crackerjack! and Rolf Harris shows.

== Personal life and death ==
In 1977 Squires's first marriage foundered and he gave up professional acting and magic to work from home so that he could look after his two pre-teenage sons. He later married Anna.

Squires died on 1 June 2023, at the age of 91. His death was cryptically announced by means of the Guardian's prize crossword, partly set by his colleague John Halpern ("Paul"), on 10 June 2023. Several old clues composed by "Rufus" were incorporated. This echoed the paper's late solver Araucaria announcing his cancer diagnosis in a crossword grid.

== See also ==
- John Galbraith Graham
