= Klebs =

Klebs is a German surname. Notable people with the surname include:

- Arnold Klebs (1870–1943), Swiss microbiologist and physician; son of Edwin Klebs
- Edwin Klebs (1834–1913), German-born Swiss pathologist and army medic; father of Arnold Klebs
- Elimar Klebs (1852–1918), German historian; brother of Georg Klebs
- Georg Klebs (1857–1918), German botanist; brother of Elimar Klebs

== See also ==
- KLEB, American radio station in Louisiana
- Rosa Klebb, fictional villain in From Russia with Love (Ian Fleming novel, 1957/Terence Young film, 1963)
- Sarah Hayes (crossword compiler) (pen named Rosa Klebb; born ?), British cryptic crossword setter
