= Sarah Hayes =

Sarah Hayes may refer to:

- Sarah Hayes (crossword compiler), British crossword setter also known as Arachne
- Sarah Hayes (musician), British folk artist
- Sarah Hayes (writer), author of books illustrated by Barbara Firth including The Grumpalump (1991)

== See also ==
- Sarah Hay (born 1987), American actress and ballet dancer
