= Margaret Irvine =

British crossword compiler (1948–2023)

Margaret Irvine (20 January 1948 – 24 June 2023) was a British crossword compiler. She created hundreds of cryptic crosswords between 2006 and 2023 mostly for The Guardian under the pseudonym Nutmeg. She also set puzzles in The Times, The Church Times and, as Mace, in the New Statesman. As of January 2023, Irvine was The Guardian's 7th most prolific current cryptic crossword setter and the 24th most prolific all-time setter.

== Early life ==
Irvine was born on 20 January 1948 in Crosby, Merseyside; she was the only child of Malcolm Irvine, a tax collector, and his wife Kitty. When she was 11, they moved to Bispham, near Blackpool and two years later they moved again to Fetcham, Surrey. As a child, Irvine and her family would do the cryptic crossword from that day's paper each evening. She learned Latin for two years at school which she later credited as being helpful for creating puzzles because it was useful to understand the meaning and construction of words.

== Education and career ==
Irvine studied maths and economics at the University of York before going to work at the Home Office. She later worked in the computer science department of the University of Manchester, staying there until her early retirement in 2005 and living in Chorlton. In retirement, Irvine volunteered at a primary school, where she undertook literacy work, and at a toddlers' group.

== Crossword compiling ==
Irvine set puzzles for The Guardian, The Times, the New Statesman, The Church Times, the i newspaper's Inquisitor, The Sunday Telegraph's Enigmatic Variations, The Listener, and The Magpie Crossword Magazine. Her first crossword published in The Guardian was a 2006 'Quiptic' puzzle; her first cryptic crossword for the Guardian was No. 26,058, published in September 2013. Irvine set over 180 cryptic crosswords for The Guardian over the course of her career.

In 2014, Irvine featured on Woman's Hour alongside John Halpern to talk about gender disparity in crossword setting.

In 2016, she joined compilers Arachne and Puck to create a crossword to mark UN World Toilet Day under the joint pseudonym 'Bogus'. The three also set puzzles for World Smile Day in October 2017 and World Naked Gardening Day in May 2021.

In a 2017 interview, Irvine said she aimed to do seven or eight clues per day and to finish a complete crossword in four days before coming back to "tweak and polish it" later. She noted that The Times was "less permissive" with its crosswords than The Guardian which she said "allows more variation and individuality". Irvine used the Collins English Dictionary, the Concise Oxford English Dictionary, the Chambers Dictionary and its Crossword edition, and the Bradford's Crossword Solver's Dictionary.

She was invited to compile crosswords for the New Statesman in 2018 and created 29 for the magazine under the pseudonym Mace; her last puzzle was No. 592, published on 15 July 2022.

=== Pseudonyms ===
Irvine's most well-known pseudonym was 'Nutmeg' - from Meg, a diminutive of Margaret, and because "she was happy to be considered a slightly eccentric 'nut'". In the New Statesman, she compiled under 'Mace', another spice made from the nutmeg seed.

== Personal life ==
Irvine was active in Girlguiding, being a Brown Owl for a Brownie pack for almost 20 years and winning a Queen's Guide Award. She enjoyed cricket and was a life member of Lancashire County Cricket Club. Her other interests included classical music and genealogy.

Irvine suffered a fall in 2022 from which she never recovered; she died in 2023.
