= Crossword abbreviations =

Crossword clue technique

Cryptic crosswords often use abbreviations to clue individual letters or short fragments of the overall solution. These include:

- Any conventional abbreviations found in a standard dictionary, such as:
  - "current": AC (for "alternating current"); less commonly, DC (for "direct current"); or even I (the symbol used in physics and electronics)
- Roman numerals: for example the word "six" in the clue might be used to indicate the letters VI
- The name of a chemical element may be used to signify its symbol; e.g., W for tungsten
- The days of the week; e.g., TH for Thursday
- Country codes; e.g., "Switzerland" can indicate the letters CH
- ICAO spelling alphabet: where Mike signifies M and Romeo R
- Conventional abbreviations for US cities and states: for example, "New York" can indicate NY and "California" CA or CAL.

The abbreviation is not always a short form of the word used in the clue. For example:

- "Knight" for N (the symbol used in chess notation)

Taking this one stage further, the clue word can hint at the word or words to be abbreviated rather than giving the word itself. For example:

- "About" for C or CA (for "circa"), or RE.
- "Say" for EG, used to mean "for example".

More obscure clue words of this variety include:

- "Model" for T, referring to the Model T.
- "Beginner" or synonyms such as "novice" or "student" for L, as in L-plate.
- "Bend" for S or U (as in "S-bend" and "U-bend")
- "Books" for OT or NT, as in Old Testament or New Testament.
- "Sailor" for AB, abbreviation of able seaman.
- "Take" for R, abbreviation of the Latin word recipe, meaning "take".

Most abbreviations can be found in the Chambers Dictionary as this is the dictionary primarily used by crossword setters. However, some abbreviations may be found in other dictionaries, such as the Collins English Dictionary and Oxford English Dictionary.

== A ==
- Aboard – SS, or a word inside the letters SS
- About – C or CA (circa) or RE
- Abstainer – TT (teetotaller)
- Academic – DD (doctor of divinity) or PROF
- Acceleration – G
- Accepted – A
- Account – AC
- Accountant – CA (chartered accountant)
- Ace – A or AI (A-1)
- Adult – A
- Advanced – A
- Advert – AD
- African organisation – ANC (African National Congress)
- Afternoon – PM
- Against – V or VS (versus)
- Agent – REP (representative)
- Agricultural – AG
- Air conditioning – AC
- Airman – AC (aircraftsman), LAC (leading aircraftsman) or PO (pilot officer)
- Airmen – RAF (Royal Air Force)
- Alien – ET (extraterrestrial)
- Also known as – AKA
- Aluminium – AL (chemical symbol)
- Alumnus – OB (old boy) or OG (old girl)
- Ambassador – HE (his/her excellency)
- America – A, AM, US or USA (United States of America)
- American – GI (U.S. soldier)
- American ship – USS
- Amnesty – AI (Amnesty International)
- Anglican – CE (Church of England)
- Answer – A
- Arbiter – REF (referee)
- Archdeacon – VEN (Venerable)
- Area – A
- Army cop – MP (Military Policeman)
- Army corps – REME (Royal Electrical and Mechanical Engineers (British army)) or RE (Royal Engineers)
- Arsenic – AS (chemical symbol)
- Article – A, AN (indefinite articles) or THE (definite article)
- Artificial intelligence – AI
- Artillery – RA (Royal Artillery)
- Artist – RA (Royal Academy)
- At – A (Similar to the @ symbol)
- At home – IN
- Atmosphere – AT
- Attorney – DA (District Attorney) or PA (Practicing Attorney)
- Australia – A, AUS or OZ (slang name for Australia)
- Avenue – AVE
- Award – OM (Order of Merit)

== B ==
- Bachelor of Arts – BA
- Bachelor of Medicine – BM, MB
- Base – E (base of natural logarithms) or TEN (base of common logarithms)
- Basque nationalists – ETA
- Bearing – N, E, S, W, NE, NW, etc. (points of the compass)
- Beginner – L (for Learner)
- Bend – S or U (U-bend and S-bend)
- Bible – AV (King James bible Authorized Version)
- Bill – AC (account), IOU, TAB
- Bishop – B or RR (Right Reverend) or DD (Doctor of Divinity)
- Boat – SS (screw steamer)
- Bob – S (shilling)
- Book (or books) – B, NT (New Testament), OT (Old Testament), MS (Manuscript), GEN (Genesis), AV (King James bible Authorized Version)
- Bowled – B (Cricket scorecard)
- Boy – B
- Bridge player – N, E, S, W
- British – B
- Broadcaster – BBC (British Broadcasting Corporation)
- By – X (multiplication)
- Byte – B

== C ==
- Calcium – CA
- California – CA
- Cape – C
- Car – T (Model T), RR (Rolls-Royce)
- Cardinal – N, E, S, W, RED (a vivid shade of red, which may get its name from the cassocks worn by Catholic cardinals)
- Care of – CO
- Caught – C or CT
- Celsius – C
- Cent – C
- Centigrade – C
- Century – C
- Certificate – X, U, PG, R, G (from the film certificates)
- Champion – CH
- Charge – Q (Electric charge)
- Charged – ION
- Charlie – C (NATO phonetic alphabet)
- Chartered accountant – CA
- Check or Checkmark – V (Similar shape to a checkmark)
- Chief – CH
- Chlorine – CL (chemical symbol)
- Chromosome – X or Y
- Church – CH or CE (Church of England) or RC (Roman Catholic)
- Circa – C
- Circle – O (the letter O is a circle)
- City – NY (New York), LA (Los Angeles), or EC (postcode for City of London)
- Closed – TO (like a door)
- Club – Y (YMCA)
- Coin – P (penny), D (from the Latin denarius) or C (cent) – D or C would usually have "old" or "American" as well as "coin".
- College – C
- Cold – C
- Colonel – COL
- Colt – C
- Commander-In-Chief – CINC, CIC (less common)
- Commercial – AD
- Committee – COM
- Communist – RED, CHE (Che Guevara)
- Companion – CH (Order of the Companions of Honour)
- Company – CO
- Compare – CF (abbreviation of the Latin confer)
- Compass point – N, E, S, W (and other bearings)
- Computer – PC
- Concerning – RE
- Conservationists – NT (National Trust)
- Conservative – C, CON, TORY, BLUE
- Constable – PC (police constable)
- Constant – E, PI, K, C or G
- Contralto – C
- Copper – P (penny), D (denarius), CU (chemical symbol), PC (police constable)
- Corner – .SE, NW, NE, SW
- Councillor – CL, CLR, CLLR
- Court – CT
- Credit – CR
- Criminal – CON
- Cross – X
- Current – AC (alternating current), DC (direct current), I (electric current), AD (Anno Domini) or AMP (ampere)
- Current account – CA
- Cystic fibrosis – CF

== D ==
- Date – D
- Daughter – D
- Day – D
- Dead or Died – D, DEC (deceased), EX, OB (abbreviation)
- Debts – IOUS (IOU)
- Deceased – D, DEC, EX
- Decoration – VC (Victoria Cross), GC (George Cross), MM (Military Medal)
- Degree – DEG, C (Celsius or Centigrade), F (Fahrenheit), BA (Bachelor of Arts), MA (Master of Arts).
- Democrat – D
- Departs – D
- Detective – DC (Detective Constable), DS (Detective Sergeant), DI (Detective Inspector) or PI (Private Investigator)
- Detective inspector – DI
- Detectives – CID (Criminal Investigation Department), YARD (Scotland Yard)
- Deutschmark – DM
- Dial – O
- Dictionary – OED (Oxford English Dictionary)
- Dinner jacket – DJ
- Direction – N, E, S, W (and other points of the compass)
- Director – D
- Disc – O (the letter O is round, like a disc), EP (extended play), LP (long play), CD (compact disc)
- Disease – TB (tuberculosis), ME (myalgic encephalomyelitis)
- Doctor – DOC, BM (Bachelor of Medicine), MB (Medicinae Baccalaureus), MD (Medicinae Doctor), MO (medical officer), NO (Dr. No), GP (General Practitioner), DR, WHO (Doctor Who)
- Doctor of Divinity – DD
- Donut – O
- Drama – NOH (Japanese drama Noh)
- Drama Company – REP
- Drip – IV (intravenous drip)
- Drug – C (cocaine), E, X (both short for ecstasy) or H (heroin)
- Drunk/Drunkard – sot (an old-fashioned word for drunkard)
- Dry – TT (teetotal) or AA (Alcoholics Anonymous)
- Duck – O (from the cricket score of 0)
- Ducks – OO
- Duke – D

== E ==
- Each – EA
- Earl – E
- East – E
- East Germany – GDR (German Democratic Republic)
- Echo – E
- Economists – LSE (London School of Economics)
- Ecstasy – E or X (slang names for the drug)
- Editor – ED
- Egg – O (the letter O loosely resembles the shape of an egg)
- Elected – IN
- Electricity – AC (alternating current), DC (direct current)
- Eleven – II (II looks similar to 11), or XI (Roman numerals)
- End of war – VE (Victory in Europe, the end of World War II)
- Energy – E, J (joule)
- Engagement – GIG
- Engineer – CE (civil engineer), RE (Royal Engineer), REME (Royal Electrical and Mechanical Engineers) or ME (mechanical engineer)
- English – E, EN, ENG
- Escape – ESC
- Established – EST
- Estimated time of arrival – ETA
- Europe – EU (European Union), EC (European Community)
- European – E
- [for] Everyone – U ('Universal' BBFC rating)
- Excellent – AI (looks like 'A1' (first-class, first-rate, top-notch))
- Exercise – PE (physical education), PT (physical training), TRAIN
- Extra – W (from the extra runs in cricket for a wide ball)
- Extra large – XL
- Extra terrestrial – ET

== F ==
- Fahrenheit – F
- Father – DA, DAD, FR, PA
- Fellow – F
- Female – F
- Fifty – L (Roman numeral (lower case L))
- Fighter (plane) – MIG (type of plane)
- Fine – F
- Firm – CO (company)
- Fish – Ling (an old-fashioned name for salted Atlantic cod, but can also refer to other fish such as common ling)
- Five – V (Roman numeral)
- Five hundred – D (Roman numeral)
- Fleet – RN (Royal Navy)
- Fliers – RAF (Royal Air Force)
- Flying bomb – VI (looks like V1)
- Following – F
- Football association – FA
- Football club – FC
- For example – EG (e.g., short for the Latin exempli gratia)
- Force – F, G (gravity), N (newton)
- Former – EX
- Four – IV (Roman Numeral)
- France – F
- Frenchman – M (Monsieur)
- Friend – PAL

== G ==
- Game – RU (Rugby Union)
- Gangster/gang leader – AL (Al Capone)
- Gas – H (hydrogen), O (oxygen), N (nitrogen), CS (tear gas)
- Genetic code – DNA or RNA
- Georgia – GA (as in, the US state of Georgia)
- German submarine – U (U-boat)
- Germany – GER, D (Deutschland)
- Glasses – OO
- Gold – AU (chemical symbol), OR (in heraldry)
- Good – PI (pious)
- Good Man – S or ST (abbreviations for saint)
- Government – G
- Graduate – BA, MA (university degrees), BED (Bachelor of Education)
- Gram – G
- Grand – G, M (Roman numeral for 1000), K (kilo-)
- Grand prix – GP
- Group – GP
- Grunt – GI (General Infantryman)
- Gunners/Gunmen – RA (Royal Artillery)
- Gym – PE (Physical Education) or PT (Physical Training)

== H ==
- Hand – N, E, S, W (Bridge hands) or L, R (left and right)
- Hard – H
- Hear – T (Position on hearing aid)
- Hectare – HA
- Helium – HE
- Henry – H
- Heroin – H
- Hesitation – ER
- Hire purchase – HP
- Hole – O
- Holy man – ST (saint)
- Home – IN (opposite of 'out')
- Home counties – SE (South East England)
- Honour – A, J, Q, K (honours in bridge)
- Honours – BA or MA (see Degree)
- Horse – G, GG (slang), H
- Hospital – H, SAN (short for Sanatorium)
- Hospital Department – AE (Accident & Emergency), ENT (Ear, Nose & Throat)
- Hour – H, HR
- House – HO
- Houses of Parliament – HP
- Hug – O (the symbol for a hug)
- Hundred – C (Roman numeral), TON
- Husband – H
- Hydrogen – H

== I ==
- Iceland – IS (country code)
- Image – PIC
- Inch – IN
- Independent – I or IND
- Information technology – IT
- Initials – inits.
- Inspector – DI (Detective inspector)
- Intelligence – IQ
- International – I or INT
- Internet/internet provider – ISP (internet service provider)
- Iodine – I (chemical symbol)
- Ireland – IRE
- Irish Republican Army – IRA
- Iron – FE (chemical symbol)
- Island – IS or I
- Israel – IL
- Isle of Man – IOM

== J ==
- Jack – J, TAR, AB (sailor)
- Jet – MIG (type of plane)
- Jolly – RM (Royal Marine)
- Journalist – ED (editor)
- Judge – J, REF
- Junction – T (T-junction)
- Junior – JR
- Japan – YEN

== K ==
- Kelvin – K
- Kentucky – KY
- Key – A, B, C, D, E, F or G (musical keys), ALT, ESC, DEL (computer keyboard keys)
- Kick off – KO
- Kilo – K
- King – K, R (from the Latin rex), HM (His Majesty), or GR (George Rex), or CR (Charles Rex). Also BB (B.B. King, singer-songwriter)
- Kiss – X (the symbol for a kiss)
- Knave – J (Jack)
- Knight – K, KT, KBE (Knight Commander of the Order of the British Empire) or KG (Knight of the Garter) or N (the symbol for a knight on a chessboard)
- Knock out – KO
- Knot – KT

== L ==
- Labour – LAB
- Lake – L or LA
- Landlord – LETTER (somebody who lets property)
- Large – L, OS (oversize)
- Large number – C, D, M (Roman numerals) or K (kilo-)
- Last – Z (the last letter of the alphabet)
- Last month – ULT (ultimo)
- Latin – L or LAT
- Lawrence – DH (D. H. Lawrence) or TE (T. E. Lawrence)
- Lawyer – DA
- Lead – PB (chemical symbol)
- Learner – L
- Lecturer – L
- Left – L
- Leg – ON (cricket: 'on' side = leg side)
- Liberal – L or LIB
- Lieutenant – LT
- Line – L
- Lines – LL, RY (railway), BR (British Rail)
- Literary/Literature – LIT
- Litre – L
- local – PH or PUB (public house)
- Local area network – LAN
- London Philharmonic Orchestra – LPO
- London police – MET (Metropolitan Police Service)
- Long playing record – LP
- Long wave – LW
- Look – LO
- Lord – LD
- Los Angeles – LA
- Loud – F (forte) or FF (fortissimo)
- Love – O (zero score in tennis)

== M ==
- Madame – MME (as in French)
- Maiden – M (cricket terminology for no runs in an over)
- Male – M, HE or PA
- Manager – MIC (man in charge)
- Many – Any Roman numeral(s) of considerable size
- Map-makers – OS (Ordnance Survey)
- Marines – RM (Royal Marines)
- Married – M
- Master – M
- Master of Arts – MA
- Master of ceremonies – MC
- Master's – MA (Master of Arts degree)
- Medal – VC (Victoria Cross), GC (George Cross), OBE (Order of the British Empire), OM (Order of Merit)
- Medic – DOC (short for doctor), BM (Bachelor of Medicine), MB (Medicinae Baccalaureus), MD (Medicinae Doctor), MO (medical officer), GP (General Practitioner), DR (short for doctor)
- Mediterranean Sea – MED
- Mega – M
- Megabyte – MB
- Member – MP (same as Member of Parliament (below)), ARM, LEG, words for male genitals
- Member of Parliament – MP
- Men – OR (Other ranks)
- Messerschmitt – ME
- Metre – M
- Middle East – ME
- Midfielder – L (the 'mid' letter of 'fielder')
- Military Police – MP
- Million – M
- Miners – NUM (National Union of Mineworkers)
- Minister – MP, Rev
- Ministry of Defence – MOD
- Minute – M
- Model – T (Model T Ford)
- Monarch – CR (Charles Rex), ER (Elizabeth Regina), GR (George Rex), Q (queen), K (king) or R (rex/regina)
- Money – M
- Monsieur – M
- Morning or Half Day – AM
- Mother – MA
- Motor racing – FI (as in F1, Formula One)
- Motorists – AA (The Automobile Association), RAC (Royal Automobile Club)
- Motorway – M or MI (looks like M1)
- Murderer – CAIN (killed his brother Abel in the Book of Genesis)
- Museum – VA (Victoria and Albert museum in London)

== N ==
- Namely – SC, SS (both from the Latin scilicet), alternative to IE
- National Trust – NT
- Navy – RN (Royal Navy), ABS (able-bodied seamen) or TARS (slang for seamen)
- Nazis – SS (Schutzstaffel)
- Neon – NE (chemical symbol)
- Never-never – HP (synonym for hire purchase)
- New – N
- New Testament – NT
- News – NN (N[ew] + N[ew])
- Newspaper – RAG, FT (Financial Times)
- Newton – N (scientific unit of force)
- Nil – O (the letter)
- Nitrogen – N
- No – N or X
- No ball – NB (cricket terminology)
- Noon – M, N
- North – N
- Not applicable – NA
- Note – NB (from the Latin nota bene), PS (from postscript at the end of a letter) or A, B, C, D, E, F, G (musical notes) or DO, RE, MI, FA, SO/SOH, LA, TE/TI (musical notes). LA is most commonly referenced.
- Nothing – O (the letter O looks like the number 0), FA (from Fanny Adams)
- Notice – D (from D-Notice)
- Now – AD (from the Latin Anno Domini)
- Number – NO, V, X, C, D, M, L (Roman numerals)
- Nurse – EN (enrolled nurse), SEN (State Enrolled Nurse) or RN (registered nurse)

== O ==
- Odds – SP (starting price)
- Officer – OC (Officer Corps) or CO (Commanding Officer)
- Old – O, OL (e.g. "good ol' boy")
- Old man – PA, DAD
- Old person – OAP
- Old Testament – OT
- One – I (I is the Roman numeral for 1) or rarely A, AN (not normally used in British crosswords), ACE (playing card), UNIT
- Operating system – OS
- Operation – OP
- Order – OM (Order of Merit)
- Ordinary Seaman – OS, Rating
- Oriental – E (East)
- Other Ranks – OR (military term for non-commissioned ranks)
- Ounce – OZ (abbreviation)
- Outside broadcasting – OB
- Outsized – OS
- Outstanding – OS
- Over – O
- Over the top – OTT
- Overdose – OD
- Oversize – OS
- Oxygen – O

== P ==
- Page – P
- Painters – RA (Royal Academy)
- Pair – PR
- Papers – ID (identity document)
- Paramilitaries – ETA (Basque Nationalists), IRA (Irish Republican Army), UFF (Ulster Freedom Fighters), UDA (Ulster Defence Association)
- Paratrooper – PARA
- Parking – P
- Party – LAB, LIB or LD, CON or C or TORY (UK political parties), DO
- Peacekeepers – UN (United Nations)
- Pencil – HB
- Penny – P, D (old penny), CU (copper)
- Phone company – BT or EE
- Physical education – PE
- Physical training – PT
- Physicists – CERN (European Organization for Nuclear Research)
- Piano – P
- Pig – SOW
- Pint – PT
- Place – PL, SET, SITE, SPOT
- Plane – MIG (type of plane)
- Plate – L or P (L-plate and P-plate)
- Please – O (as in 'O..!', an interjection sometimes used as a plea in poetry)
- Poem – IF (Kipling)
- Poet – PO, TS (T.S. Eliot)
- Point – N, E, S, W (and other compass bearings)
- Pole – N (north) or S (south)
- Policeman/men – PC (Police Constable), DI (Detective Inspector), MET (Metropolitan Police), CID (Criminal Investigation Department)
- Politician – MP
- Posh – U (short for upper class)
- Post office – PO
- Potassium – K (chemical symbol)
- Pound – LB (weight), L (from £)
- Power – P
- Presenter – DJ (disk jockey) or MC (master of ceremonies)
- Priest – P, PR, REV (reverend), RR (Right Reverend), DD (Doctor of Divinity), FR (Father), ELI (Eli (Bible))
- Prime Minister – PM
- Prince – P, PR
- Prisoner – CON (Convict)
- Prisoner of war – POW
- Promises – IOUS (I owe yous)
- Promotion – AD (Advertisement)
- Province – NI (Northern Ireland)
- Pub – PH (Public House)
- Pudding – PUD

== Q ==
- Quarter – N, S, E, W (compass direction)
- Quartet – IV (four in Roman numerals)
- Queen – Q, ER (Elizabeth Regina), HM (Her Majesty)
- Quiet/quietly – P (piano), SH

== R ==
- Race – TT (Isle of Man TT)
- Railway – R, RY, BR (British Rail), EL (Chicago "L")
- Rated – X (film rating)
- Rechabite – TT (Rechabite – tee-total)
- Record – EP (extended play), LP (long play)
- Ref – UMP (referee – umpire)
- Regina – R
- Religious – PI (pious)
- Religious education – RE
- Republican – R, REP, GOP (Grand Old Party)
- Resistance – R (physics)
- Retired – RET
- Reverend – RR (Right Reverend), DD (Doctor of Divinity), REV
- Revolutionary — CHE (i.e. Che Guevara)
- Rex – R
- Right – R
- Right Reverend – RR
- Ring – O (the letter O looks like a ring)
- River – R, MA (Ma River), PO (Po River), OB (Ob River), DEE (Dee River), URE (Ure River),
- Road – RD or AI (looks like A1)
- Rolls-Royce – RR
- Roman Catholic – RC
- Rook – R
- Round – O (the letter O is round)
- Royal Academy – RA
- Royal Artillery – RA
- Royal Engineers – RE
- Royal Marines – RM
- Royal Navy – RN
- Rugby (Union) – RU
- Run – R
- Rural Dean – RD

== S ==
- Sailor – AB (able seaman), TAR (slang), RN, SALT, JACK, HAND, OS (ordinary seaman)
- Saint – ST or S
- Same – DO (ditto)
- Sappers – RE (the Royal Engineers equivalent of "private")
- Satisfactory – S
- Say – EG (e.g., short for the Latin exempli gratia)
- Seaman – AB (able seaman)
- Second – S or MO (moment)
- Secret service – SS
- Secretary – PA (personal assistant)
- Section – OR (Other Ranks – a 'section' of the British Armed Forces)
- See – LO
- Senior Service – RN (Royal Navy)
- Sergeant Major – SM
- Serial or Series – SER
- Service – RAF (Royal Air Force)
- Setter – I, ME, ONE (meaning the setter of the crossword)
- Setter's – MY (meaning the setter of the crossword)
- Sex appeal – IT (after Clara Bow – the It girl) or SA
- Shilling – S
- Ship – SS (screw steamer)
- Ship's officer – PO (petty officer)
- Shirt – T
- Short wave – SW
- Side – LEG, OFF, ON
- Significant other – SO
- Silk – QC or KC (From Queen's—or King's—Counsel)
- Silver – AG (chemical symbol)
- Singer – RAT (Rat Pack)
- Sixth sense – ESP (extrasensory perception)
- Sleep – Z or ZZ
- Small – S
- Snake – S
- Socialite – DEB (debutante)
- Socially acceptable – U (upper class)
- Society – S or SOC
- Sodium – NA (chemical symbol)
- Softly – P (musical notation)
- Soldier – RM (Royal Marine), RE (Royal Engineer), GI (General Infantryman), OR (Other Ranks), ANT, VET
- Soldiers – MEN, OR (Other Ranks)
- Son – S
- South – S
- Spade – S (playing card suit)
- Spain – E (International vehicle registration code)
- Special – S, SP
- Spectacles – OO
- Spies – CIA (Central Intelligence Agency), MI (Military Intelligence)
- Sport – RL (Rugby League), RU (Rugby Union)
- State – any abbreviation of an American State (e.g. CA, FL ..)
- Steam Ship – SS
- Stone – ST
- Street – ST
- Student – L (learner) or NUS (National Union of Students)
- Study – CON, DEN, READ
- Stumped – ST
- Submarine – U (U-boat) or SUB
- Succeeded – S
- [Suitable] for all [to see] – U (BBFC film classification)
- Superintendent – SUPT (police rank)
- Sweat – BO (body odor)

== T ==
- Tabloid – SUN, RAG
- Take – R (from Latin recipe, meaning "take")
- Tar – AB (able seaman)
- Tax – VAT (value added tax)
- Teacher – DON, B ED (Bachelor of Education)
- Teachers – NUT (National Union of Teachers)
- Team – XI (Roman numerals for eleven players in a football or cricket team)
- Teetotal – TT or AA (from Alcoholics Anonymous)
- Ten – X (Roman numerals) or IO (IO looks like 10)
- Tense – T (in dictionary entries, usually PT for past tense)
- Territorial Army – TA
- Terrorists – ETA (Basque Nationalists), IRA (Irish Republican Army), UFF (Ulster Freedom Fighters), UDA (Ulster Defence Association)
- Thanks – TA
- That is – IE (from the Latin id est) or SC, SS (both from the Latin scilicet meaning namely = that is)
- Theatre – REP (The Rep)
- Theologian – DD (Doctor of Divinity)
- This month – INST (from the Latin instante mense)
- Thousand – G (grand), M (Roman numeral), or K (kilo-)
- Thus – IE (short for the Latin id est), SO, SIC
- Time – T, S, M, AGE
- Times – BY, X (multiplication), TT (T[ime] + T[ime])
- Toilet – WC (water closet)
- Tory – CON (slang for Conservative)
- Trendy – IN (euphemism)
- Tripod – Y (shape of a Tripod)
- Troop – RM (Royal Marine)
- Tungsten – W (chemical symbol)
- Tyro – L (for learner)

== U ==
- Ulster – NI (Northern Ireland)
- Ulster Defence Association – UDA
- Ulster Freedom Fighters – UFF
- Ultimate – Z (last or ultimate letter of the alphabet)
- United – U (Man U., common abbreviation of Manchester United F.C.)
- United Nations – UN
- Universal – U
- University – U or OU (Open University) or UP (in the UK one goes up to university)
- Unknown – X, Y or Z (mathematical variable)
- Up or Upper – U or N (North)

== V ==
- Value added tax – VAT
- Variable – X, Y or Z (mathematical unknown)
- Vermouth – IT (from a cocktail called Gin and It which is made with gin and Italian vermouth - a forerunner of a martini)
- Version – V
- Versus – V or VS
- Very – V
- Vessel – SS
- Viscount – VIS (abbreviation)
- Volunteers – TA (Territorial Army)
- Vote – X

== W ==
- Way – RD (road), ST (street), AVE (avenue)
- Weekend – SS (Saturday/Sunday)
- Weight – G (gram), LB (pound)
- Westminster – HP (Houses of Parliament)
- Wheel – O
- Whistle-blower – REF (referee)
- Wide – W (cricket)
- Wife – W
- With – W
- Without – WO
- Work – W, OP (operation), OPUS (classical music)
- Worker – ANT, BEE, ARM, HAND (e.g. hired hand)
- Workers – TU (trade union)
- Writing – MS (manuscript)

== X ==
- X – IO (The letters IO look like the number 10)

== Y ==
- Yard – YD or Y
- Year – Y or YR
- Yen – Y
- Yes – Y
- You – U
- Yours truly – ID or I

== Z ==
- Zero – O (the letter O looks like the number 0) or Z
