= Queen's Guide =

- Awarded for: Highest attainable award for members of Girlguiding
- Sponsored by: Girlguiding UK
- Country: United Kingdom

The Queen's Guide award is the highest attainable award for members of Girlguiding.

Although originally awarded to Guides, it is now only attainable by members of the Senior Section (including Rangers, Young Leaders and Leaders) aged between 16 and 30. It is a challenging programme comparable to the King's Scout and higher than Gold Duke of Edinburgh's Award. In the 60 years between the awards creation in 1946, and 2006, 20,000 young women had gained the award.

The award's syllabus has changed numerous times, but the current version is split into five areas: service in guiding, personal skill development, community action, outdoor challenge and a residential experience. The syllabus must be completed within three years and before the Guide's 31st birthday. The emphasis in the current syllabus is on self challenge, rather than a prescribed set of tasks. The participant should complete a plan and submit it to the county Queen's Guide Advisor on commencing the award. It is possible to take a break of 12 months part way through the award in addition to the three year time limit, but no activities done during this time will count for the award.

== Syllabus ==
=== Service in Guiding ===
This section encourages the participant to take an active part in Guiding at a range of different levels, from local to national. There are four elements all of which must be completed and one element must involve at least two sections.

- Do at least 60 hours practical Guiding service, 20 hours of this must be on one project.
- Attend a residential event that lasts two days and nights and accept a responsibility that is new to you or furthers your experience.
- Take an active part in planning an event that will involve at least two units.
- Get involved with a working group at either national or regional level, or get involved with an association issue. Feedback on what you have done to a local unit.

=== Personal skill development ===
- Take up a new skill, or take an existing skill further, this should take a minimum of 60 hours over a 12-month period.

=== Community action ===
Over a 12-month period the participant should do two projects in this area, one should be research orientated and the other practical.

- Each project should include: researching, planning, carrying out, and evaluating the project. It should be of a local or regional nature, and allow further research at a regional/national and international level.
- At the end of the 12 months the evaluation from the practical project and the research should be presented to a suitable group of people.

=== Outdoor challenge ===
This section aims to develop the leadership and teamwork skills of the participant in an outdoor environment, an exploration has the same base throughout the challenge, an expedition moves to a new base each night. The mode of transport on an expedition can be foot, bicycle, horse, sail boat, canoe, or power cruiser. Different guidelines exist for distances and durations that should be travelled depending on mode of travel.

- The participant must complete challenges one to seven of the Lead Away Permit or Going Away With Licence.
  - They must also undertake further training as necessary to equip them for the challenge.
- Then undertake an Exploration or an Expedition lasting four days (three nights) accompanied by their peers.
  - Members of the groups must be between 14 and 30 (inclusive), need not be members of Girlguiding UK, only one other member of the group must be female.
  - Under 18s must have written permission from an adult with parental responsibility, and the adult must be informed if the group will contain males.
  - All participants should complete a Girlguiding UK Health Form.
  - There must be a minimum of four group members, and a maximum of seven.
  - Guiding rules, regulations and recommendations should be followed.
  - A report should be produced at the end of the trip.

=== Residential experience ===
The participant should attend a residential event lasting three days (two nights) where the majority of the other attendees are unknown to the participant. This event can be run by Girlguiding UK or another agency.

== Completion ==
On completion the participant is presented with a silver brooch, and a certificate signed by The King. The participant usually has a presentation and celebration in her local area, but national celebration are held occasionally in London. All Queen's Guides who have recently completed the award are invited. The presentation is usually performed by the Association President the Duchess of Edinburgh, although the Chief Guide has also officiated at presentation events.

== Notable Queen's Guides ==
- Margaret Irvine
- Kate Silverton

== See also ==
- List of highest awards in Scouting
- GirlGuiding New Zealand
