= Frank W. Lewis =

Frank Waring Lewis (August 25, 1912 – November 18, 2010) was an American cryptographer and cryptic crossword compiler. His puzzles were printed in The Nation for over 60 years, for a total of 2,962 puzzles. Leonard Bernstein, Kurt Vonnegut, and Katha Pollitt were listed among the fans of his puzzles.

== Personal life and career ==
Lewis was born on August 25, 1912, in Salt Lake City, Utah. His father was from England.

Lewis attended secretarial school and the University of Utah, from which he later earned a degree in absentia. He passed the federal civil service test, and earned a master's degree in music from The Catholic University of America in Washington, D.C.

In Washington, Lewis worked at government secretarial jobs. Just before World War II, Lewis was approached by Col. William F. Friedman, head of the U.S. Army's cryptography section, who was looking for "very smart" people. Lewis was hired as a civilian and helped break the code used to coordinate Japanese ships. After the war, he joined the National Security Agency (NSA). He was awarded the Decoration for Exceptional Civilian Service by both the War Department and the NSA. He may be only person to have won two such medals. Much of his work remains classified.

In 1969, he retired with his wife to the Caribbean, but they relocated to Massachusetts after the eruption of the Montserrat volcano.

He died on November 18, 2010, at age 98. He was survived by his wife of 74 years, Sylvia (née Shosteck) (October 7, 1915 - August 11, 2013). They had six children.

== Puzzles ==
Lewis discovered British-style cryptic crosswords while stationed during the war at the Bletchley Park code-breaking station in England. Lewis took over as The Nation's puzzle setter in 1947. When The Nation started running his puzzles every other week instead of weekly starting in 2008, the public outcry was so great it resumed printing the puzzles weekly. Lewis published his last puzzle in The Nation in December 2009, after which the magazine began reprinting old ones. After Lewis's death, the magazine continued to reprint old puzzles while it searched for a new puzzle setter.

== Works ==
- Lewis, Frank (1989). Problem Solving with Particular Reference to the Cryptic (or "British") Crossword and other "American Puzzles", Part One.
- Lewis, Frank (1992). Solving Cipher Problems, Cryptanalysis, Probabilities and Diagnostics. Aegean Park Press. ISBN 0-89412-178-2.
- Lewis, Frank (2006). Cryptic Crosswords from The Nation. Nation Books. ISBN 1-56025-872-1.
