= Seth Bisen-Hersh =

American author and theatre-maker

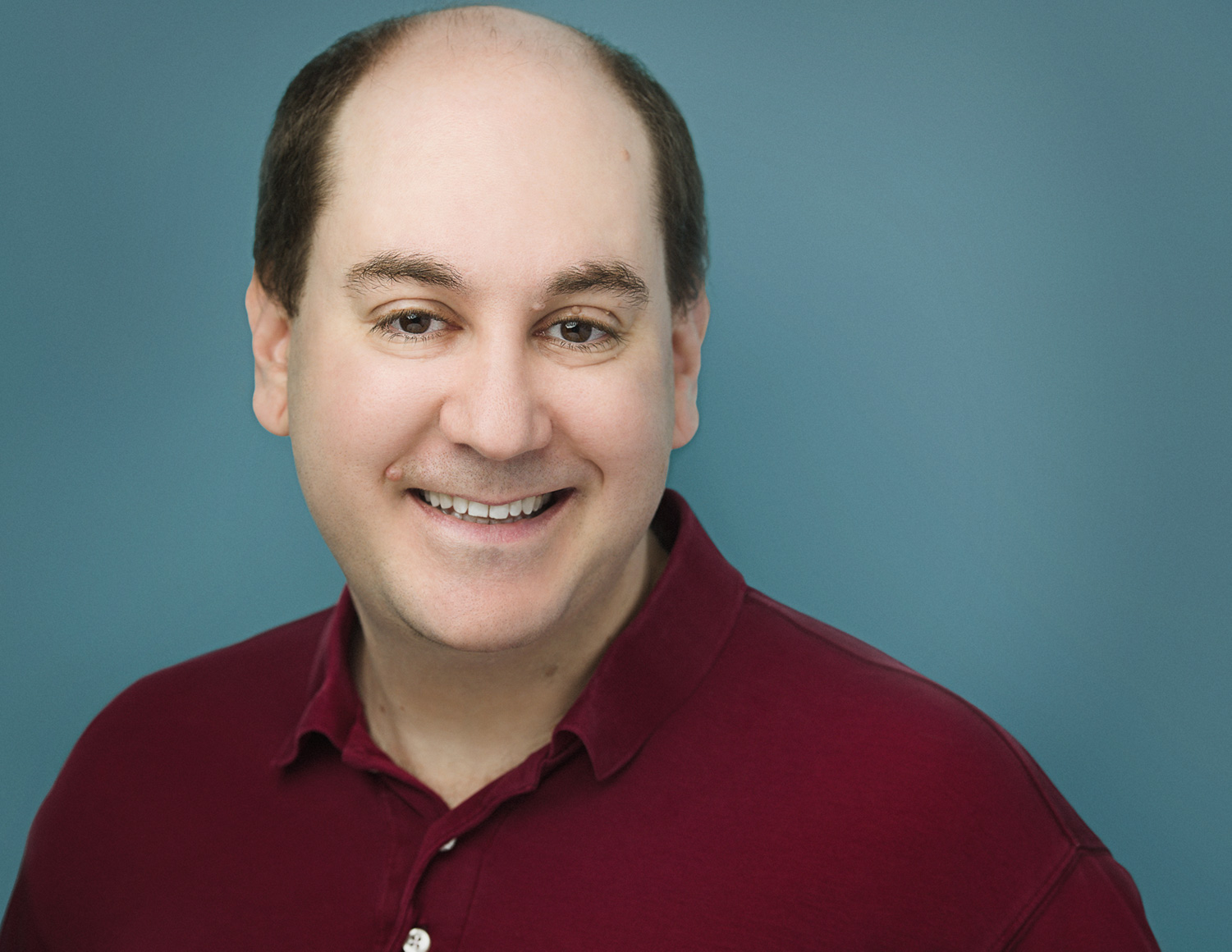
- Bisen-Hersh in 2018
- Born: East Brunswick, New Jersey
- Education: Massachusetts Institute of Technology; New York University
- Website: sethbh.com

Seth Bisen-Hersh is an American author, performer, composer/lyricist, producer, and crossword puzzle constructor.

== Early life and education ==
Bisen-Hersh grew up in East Brunswick, New Jersey. He graduated from the Massachusetts Institute of Technology with two bachelor's degrees (in Computer Science and Music) in 2001, then earned a master's degree in Music Technology from New York University in 2003.

== Career ==
Bisen-Hersh's interest in musical theater started young, and he grew up performing in children's theater productions during summers, as well as performing with local performing arts groups. He started producing and writing shows during his undergraduate studies at MIT, and became serious about pursuing a career in musical theatre during his time at graduate school in New York. His first professional musical theater production was Meaningless Sex which premiered at the 2003 New York International Fringe Festival, where it won the Audience Favorite Award.

The following year he won the NYC Fringe Festival's Audience Favorite Award for a second time, with his new musical The Spickner Spin.

He has written the score (music and lyrics) for numerous musical theatre productions, including Meaningless Sex, The Spickner Spin, More to Love, Stanley’s Party, Love Quirks, The Diamond as Big as the Ritz, Malka and Agatha Christie’s The Secret Adversary.

In 2010, he wrote a children's stage show titled Stanley’s Party, based on the popular books Stanley’s Wild Ride and Stanley’s Party by Linda Bailey. The production had a six-week run at the Manhattan Children's Theatre.

In 2014, Bisen-Hersh wrote the music for More to Love, which debuted at the West Village Musical Theatre Festival, where it won an award for Best Lyrics.

In 2016, Bisen-Hersh turned his web series, Every Day a Little Seth into a sitcom pilot.

His musical Love Quirks started life as a song cycle for a cabaret night at famed NY cabaret venue Don't Tell Mama. Bisen-Hersh worked with director Brian Childers and book writer Mark Childers to create a musical theatre show around some of his most popular cabaret songs, with a plotline revolving around a group of roommates exploring the bizarre tribulations of love and friendship. Love Quirks had a three-week run at Theatre 54 in 2014. In 2020, after some years of development, the show transferred to the off-Broadway venue St. Luke's Theater where preview performances were disrupted by the COVID-19 pandemic, the production was ultimately cancelled three days before opening night. Love Quirks finally opened at the AMT Theater in Manhattan in 2022, where it ran for twelve weeks, winning four BroadwayWorld Awards, including Best New Score for a Musical.

In 2017, he wrote the music and lyrics to a musical theatre production adapted from F. Scott Fitzgerald’s The Diamond as Big as the Ritz (with book written by R.C. Staab), which had successful readings in 2017 and 2018. The production is scheduled for a three-week run at ATA Theatre in September 2024. One of the songs from the musical, Enough Already, was turned into a music video starring Mario Lopez and was a finalist in London's prestigious 2019 Stiles & Drewe Best New Song Prize.

In April 2024, Bisen-Hersh's Broadway-bound musical Agatha Christie’s The Secret Adversary: A Mystery Musical (also adapted from the novel, and with book by R.C. Staab) had its first reading.

In June 2024, Bisen-Hersh produced a short musical film inspired by his grandmother’s Holocaust experience. The short, titled Malka, starred Tovah Feldshuh.

== Cabaret ==
Bisen-Hersh has produced over 800 cabarets at NYC’s famous cabaret venue Don’t Tell Mama, including his weekly showcase series, which started in 2017. He has also produced dozens of concerts of his songs with Broadway performers over the years. Additionally, he wrote 10 cabaret song cycles of his work: And Then She Dumped Me (2003), The Gayest Straight Man Alive (2004), Meaningful Sex (2005), Neurotic Tendencies (2006), Why Am I Not Famous Yet? (2007), Writers Block (2008), I’ll Relax When I’m Dead (2010), If Adele Can Do It, So Can I (2013), Not Your Grandma’s Cabaret (unless she’s really naughty) (2014), and Self-Isolation Song Cycle.

== Books ==
Bisen-Hersh has self-published four books.

His first, published in 2015, was a memoir titled Sleep. Write. Now: Emerging from a dark year of insomnia, anxiety and depression from loss composed of journal entries, emails, poems and song lyrics, exploring his year of struggling with mental illness. In 2016 he published an essay collection linked to his webseries, titled Every Page a Little Seth. 2018 saw the publication of his third, Millennials are Ruining the World!, a collection of humorous essays on the generation divide, which was turned into an audio book in 2019. His fourth book, The Making of a Musical: the 12 year journey of Love Quirks was released in February 2024.

== Podcast ==
In 2019, Bisen-Hersh turned his third book into a podcast Millennials are Ruining the World? an Xennial perspective". The podcast has since completed 5 seasons and 53 episodes.

== Crossword Puzzles ==
Bisen-Hersh made his debut as a crossword puzzle writer in the LA Times on 23 September 2019, and has since been published in the New York Times, The Wall Street Journal, and Universal crossword.

== Recognition and honours ==
- 2021, BroadwayWorld Awards, Best New Score of a Musical for Love Quirks.
- 2019, Stiles & Drewe Prize, Best New Song for Enough Already (from The Diamond as Big as the Ritz).
- 2014, West Village Musical Theatre Festival Best Lyrics award for More to Love.
- 2004, Theatermania FringeNYC Audience Favorite Award for The Spickner Spin.
- 2003, Theatermania FringeNYC Audience Favorite Award for Meaningless Sex.

== Work ==
=== Stage ===
- Meaningless Sex (New York International Fringe Festival, 2003)
- The Spickner Spin (New York International Fringe Festival, 2004)
- Stanley’s Party (Manhattan Children's Theatre, 2010)
- More to Love (West Village Musical Theatre Festival, 2014)
- Love Quirks (Theatre 54, 2014; St. Luke's Theater, 2020; AMT Theater, 2022)
- F. Scott Fitzgerald’s The Diamond as Big as the Ritz (ATA Theater, 2024)
- Agatha Christie’s The Secret Adversary (Reading at Ripley Grier, 2024)

=== Screenwriting ===
- Malka (short film)
- Every Day a Little Seth (pilot)
