= Mangesh Ghogre =

Indian-American crossword constructor (born 1980)

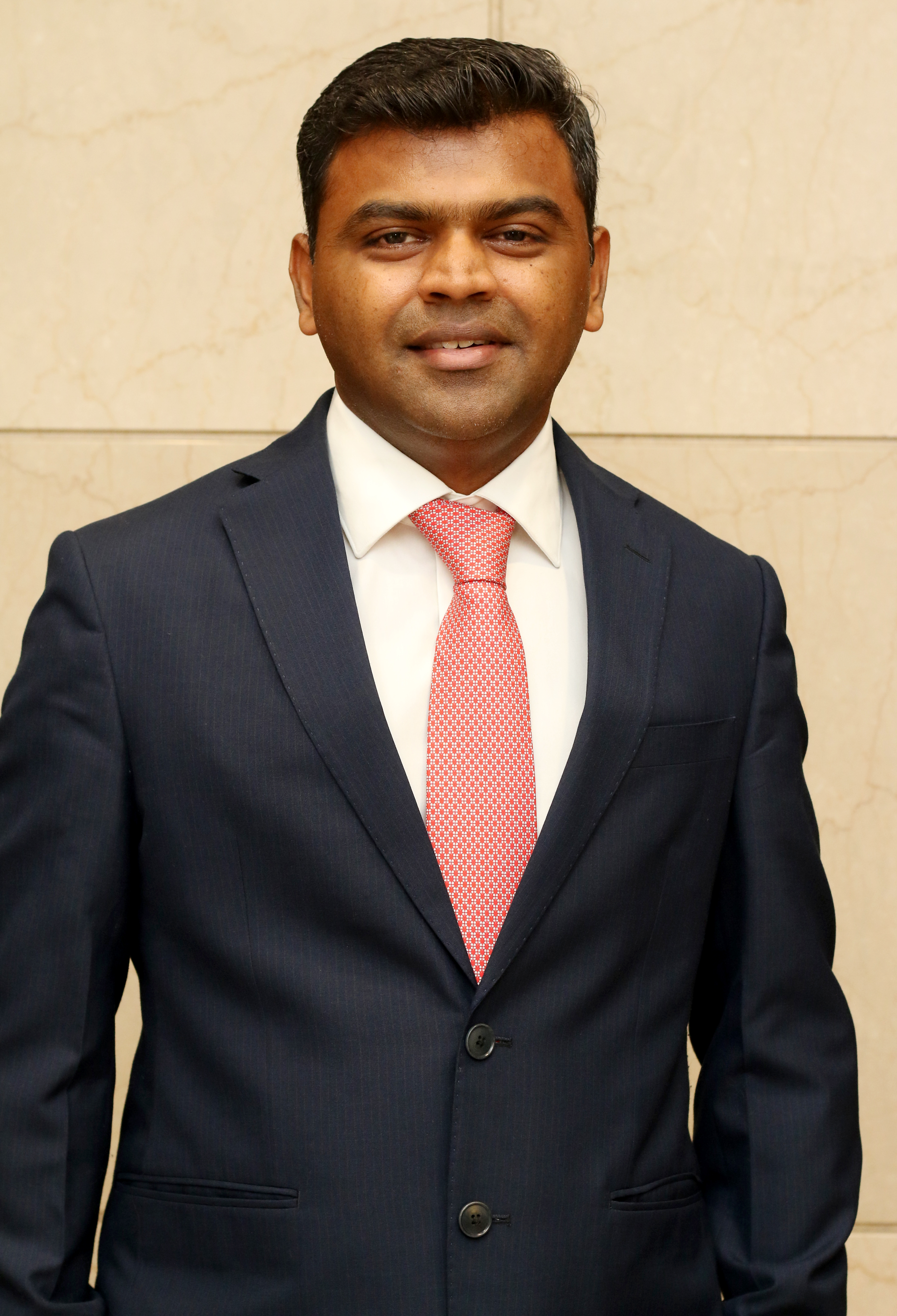
- Ghogre in 2019
- Born: 1980 (age 44–45); Chandrapur, India
- Education: Veermata Jijabai Technological Institute (VJTI), NMIMS
- Occupations: Investment banker; crossword constructor

Mangesh Ghogre (born 1980) is an Indian crossword constructor who has had puzzles published in The New York Times, The Wall Street Journal and the Los Angeles Times. He is credited as being the first Indian to have constructed crosswords for the LA Times and Wall Street Journal. His crosswords have also been featured in publications like Games and World of Puzzles.

Ghogre was recognized as the first India-based crossword constructor for the Los Angeles Times in 2010 and in 2012 became the first Indian to judge the American Crossword Puzzle Tournament. In 2014, The New York Times published one of Ghogre's crosswords for the US Independence Day edition on July 4 which was aimed at bringing the people of India and the US closer together.

In 2019, Mangesh Ghogre created a Mahatma Gandhi–themed crossword to celebrate his 150th birth anniversary, which The New York Times published on October 2.

== Career ==
Ghogre was born in Chandrapur in 1980 and grew up in Mumbai.

His interest in crosswords began in the year 1997, when, in order to develop a good vocabulary for the GMAT, he started solving crosswords originally published in the Los Angeles Times.

After several rejections, his first crossword was published in the Los Angeles Times. As a tribute to the city of Mumbai, he published another crossword in the LA Times with the byline "Mangesh Mumbaikar Ghogre".

Ghogre is an investment banker by profession. Ghogre graduated from Veermata Jijabai Technological Institute (VJTI) as a mechanical engineer received an MBA degree from NMIMS with specialisation in finance.
In June 2019, Ghogre was featured in Fortune magazine's annual list of the 40 under-40 sharpest minds in business.

Ghogre also contributes to the "Speaking Tree" column of the Times of India.

In 2022, he was granted the prestigious EB-1 visa ("Einstein visa") for his extraordinary skills in making American crosswords.

In December 2022, Mangesh Ghogre resigned from Nomura and moved to the US. According to The Economic Times, Nomura completed 27 IPOs while Ghogre was employed as the head of the bank's equity capital markets division, including a number of deals worth over $500 million.
