= Bob Smithies =

British journalist (1934–2006)

Robert Smithies (4 April 1934 – 31 July 2006) was a British photographer, journalist and crossword compiler. He was born in Middleton, near Rochdale, Lancashire.

Smithies began his career from school at the Manchester Evening News as a darkroom assistant, progressing to the post of photographer there and later at the Manchester Guardian.

Smithies joined Granada Television in the mid-1970s and presented a number of television programmes between then and 2005, including the regional news programme Granada Reports and Down To Earth.

Since his first cryptic crossword was accepted by The Guardian newspaper in 1966, Smithies was a regular compiler for the newspaper, under the pseudonym Bunthorne, the name taken from the leading character in the Gilbert and Sullivan light opera Patience.

As a crossword setter his clues became known for requiring potentially obscure general knowledge, ranging from Austen and Dickens to French cheeses. One of his most famous clues was "Amundsen's forwarding address (4)" – (mush).

== Photography exhibitions ==
- A Long Exposure: 100 Years of Pictures from Guardian Photographers in Manchester (1908–2008), The Lowry (Salford), October 2008 – March 2009. With Walter Doughty, Tom Stuttard, Graham Finlayson, Neil Libbert, Don McPhee and Denis Thorpe.
