= John Halpern =

Cryptic crossword compiler (born 1967)

John Halpern aka 'Paul' from The Guardian
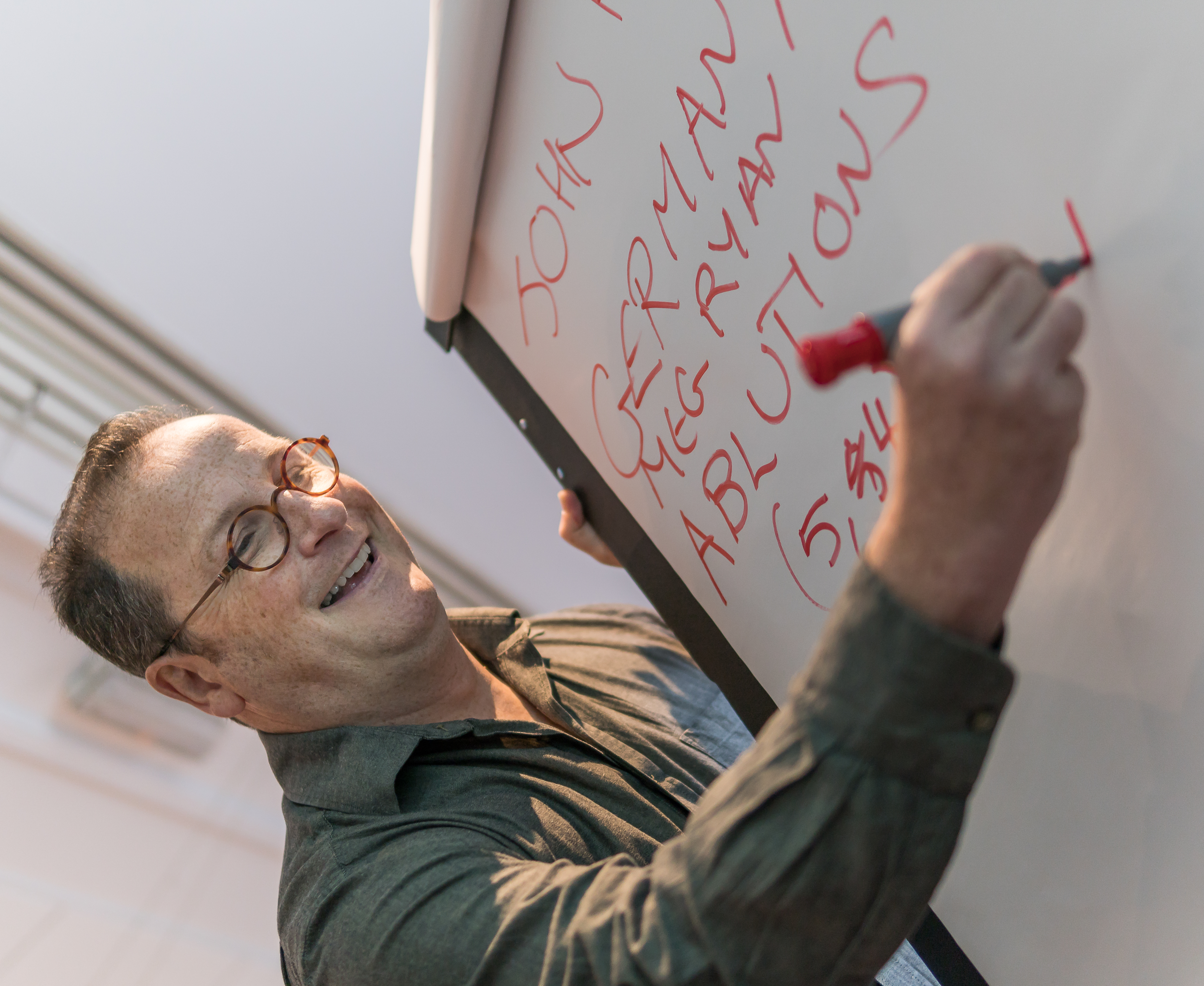
- Halpern writing cryptic crossword clues
- Born: 21 June 1967 (age 59); Cuckfield, Sussex, United Kingdom
- Notable work: The Guardian

Comedy career
- Years active: 1979—present
- Medium: Cryptic crossword setter
- Genre: Cryptic crossword
- Subjects: Crosswords, British culture
- Website: johnhalpern.co.uk

John Halpern (born Cuckfield, Sussex, 21 June 1967) is a cryptic crossword compiler for newspapers including The Guardian (as Paul), The Independent (as Punk), The Times, the Daily Telegraph (as Dada) and The Financial Times (as Mudd).

Halpern's interest in The Guardian cryptic crossword puzzle began when he was a student in Canterbury, and he wondered if the compilers could possibly be human beings. After completing a puzzle for the first time, he set about creating two of his own to send to his hero John Galbraith Graham, known as "Araucaria", and accomplished this two and a half years later. He now writes three or four a week for a variety of publications.

Having studied music and maths, Halpern became a local reporter, barman, warehouse packer, bank clerk and lab technician. He taught English in Rome, but found that hands-on examples of the present continuous kept causing him to lead his students out of the classroom, on to the street and into bars where he would put their understanding of his lesson to the test: ‘You are buying me a drink’.

Halpern’s favourite clue of his own is "To make cheese, how do you milk a Welsh hedgehog? (10)" (answer: CAERPHILLY). The first clue he ever wrote for the Guardian was "Name sewn into footballers' underwear (8)" (answer: KNICKERS – N for name, in KICKERS).

In March 2012, Halpern and Graham hosted a crossword show at The Guardian offices. He is working on a film and follow-up tour. Halpern is a By-Fellow at Churchill College, Cambridge.

== Early years ==
Halpern grew up in a house in the woods in Sussex. He was inspired by the surrounding countryside, and by his parents' love of wordplay; they both solved cryptic crosswords regularly. His father Tony would make wordplay jokes at the dinner table every night, where meals would include toad-in-the-hole, renamed 'frog-in-the-bog', and a strawberry mousse dubbed 'pinky stuff', which became 'stinky puff'. An avid reader of nonsense poetry, and a fan of Monty Python, as a boy Halpern would write poems, stories and songs – and was a member of a band at school named Xerox, where lyrics were often chosen randomly by opening a dictionary while blindfolded and choosing random words.

== Death of Halpern's father and brother ==
Two major events were to shape Halpern's early adulthood. His father died suddenly at the age of 53, when John was eighteen. The second event of Halpern's early adulthood was the death of his only brother, Paul, in a car accident. Paul had been John's best friend and he was saddened he never got the chance to fulfil his dreams. In his honour, John felt he must do everything he could to fulfil his own dreams as well as help others along the way.

== Student years (1990–94) and learning to become a cryptic crossword setter ==
When Paul died at the age of 27, Halpern was 21. Not particularly academic, and often panicking in exams, Halpern failed to achieve the grades he wanted to study music or biology, and took a few menial jobs before reapplying for universities soon after his brother's death. At Canterbury Christ Church College he took a BSc in maths and music, though he very soon abandoned his lectures, instead devoting himself to practising writing cryptic clues.

Halpern felt that The Times published elegant puzzles, whereas The Guardian crosswords contained more humour (especially those by his hero, John Graham, with the pseudonym Araucaria). Halpern realised that if he could create a puzzle that combined the best of elegance and humour, then he would be taken on by The Guardian, his favourite newspaper. He chose the pseudonym Paul, in honour of his brother.

Practising writing clues from early in the morning until midnight, seven days a week, Halpern forgot about his degree. He’d read it takes 10,000 hours to become an expert – so chose to do 20,000 hours. An entire crossword would be written, and the best clue only chosen to go in its replacement puzzle – the others would be discarded. That process would be repeated over and over again until he had a puzzle he thought was good enough, which he posted to 'Araucaria, care of The Guardian'. Amazingly, Araucaria replied, inviting Halpern to meet him – and that was the start of his crossword-setting career.

== Early crossword years ==
After the publication of the first 'Paul' Guardian crossword on 19 April 1995, Halpern would supplement his crossword pay with full-time jobs, including a reporter on the East Grinstead Courier and from 1999 as a puzzle editor for Puzzler Media Ltd. All the time John was looking to get more crosswords published, across more UK national newspapers, the plan being to write cryptic crosswords full-time.

== Full-time cryptic crossword setter ==
In the years since 1995, Halpern has compiled crosswords for the Financial Times as Mudd, the Times (anonymous), the Telegraph as Dada and the Independent as Punk.

He married his wife Taline in 2011. The couple have a son and now live in Brighton and Hove, UK.
