= Ruth Crisp =

British crossword compiler

Ruth Crisp (1918–2007) (born Margery Ruth Edwards, who compiled under the names "Crispa" and "Vixen") was one of The Guardian's most noted crossword compilers – producing puzzles for them from 1954 to 2004. She also produced crosswords for The Daily Telegraph, The Times, The Independent, the Financial Times, The Sunday Times, and other publications. Crisp's favourite clue of her own creation was: Men's my one failing, (mother of nine) (9). The solution is Mnemosyne.
