= John Galbraith Graham =

British crossword compiler

The Reverend John Graham MBE
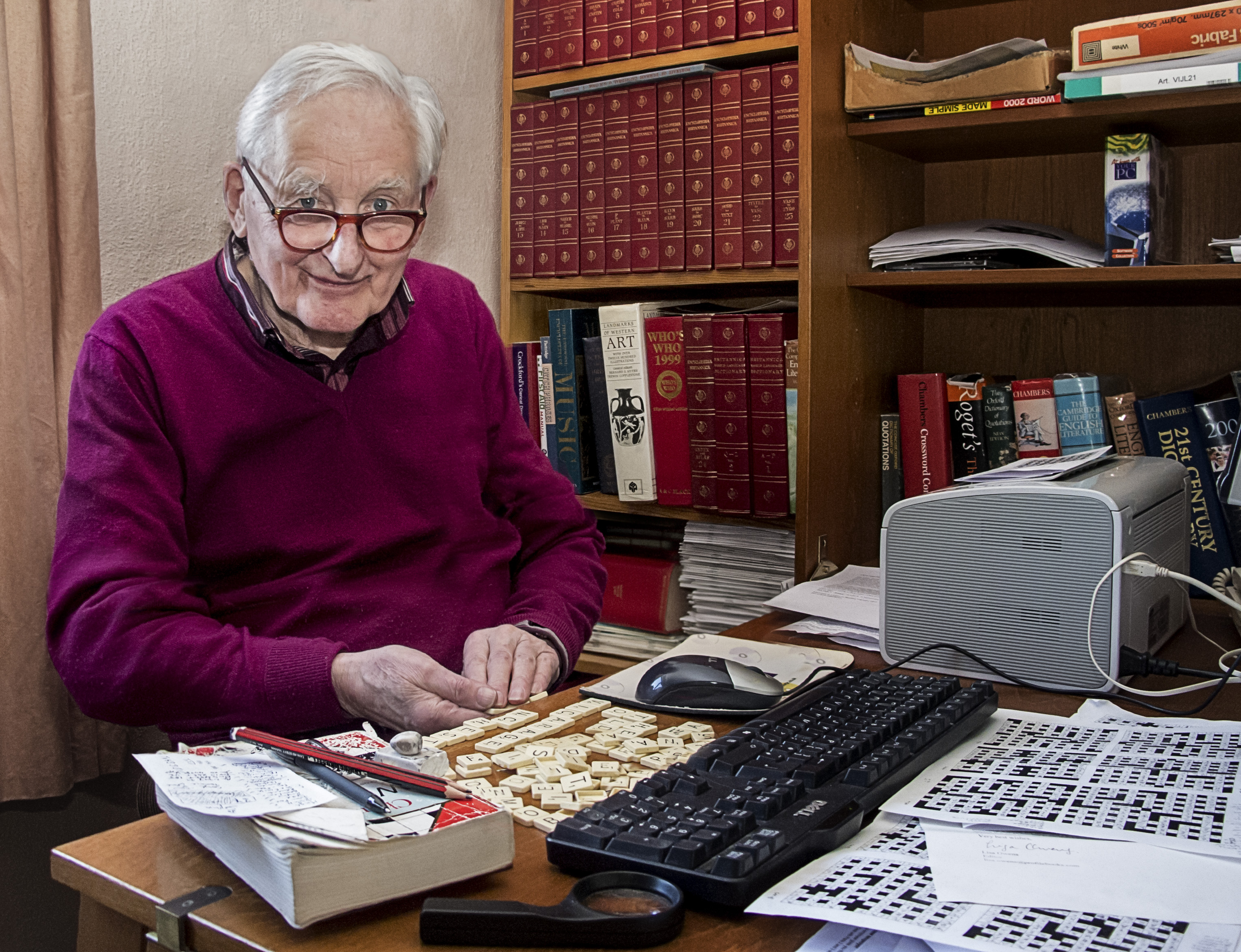
- John Graham in 2013
- Born: 16 February 1921
- Died: 26 November 2013 (aged 92)
- Other names: Araucaria; Cinephile
- Occupations: Crossword setter; priest
- Parents: Eric Graham (father); Phyllis Norton Buckle (mother)

John Galbraith Graham MBE (16 February 1921 – 26 November 2013) was a British crossword compiler, best known as Araucaria of The Guardian. He was also, like his father Eric Graham, a Church of England priest.

== Career ==
Graham was born in Oxford, where his father, Eric Graham, held the post of dean of Oriel College. The family moved to a country rectory in Wiltshire. After attending St Edward's School, Oxford, he obtained a place to read classics at King's College, Cambridge, leaving to join the RAF when the Second World War began. After the war he returned to King's to read theology. In 1949 he joined the staff of St Chad's College, Durham as Chaplain and Tutor where he worked until 1952. On Graham's departure the Principal, Theo Wetherall, paying tribute to his good nature, wrote that "he squandered his sensitive taste and knowledge of Classics on 1B Greek with unfailing patience enlivened by rare expressions of nausea". He later became a vicar in Huntingdonshire.

Writing his first puzzle for The Guardian in July 1958, he eventually took to compiling crosswords full-time when his divorce in the late 1970s lost him his living as a clergyman (he was reinstated after the death of his first wife). In December 1970, The Guardian began publishing its crosswords under the pseudonyms of their compilers, at which point Graham selected the name "Araucaria".

Besides Araucaria's cryptic crosswords in The Guardian, of which he produced around six per month, he also set around a third of the quick crosswords for The Guardian, cryptic crosswords as Cinephile in the Financial Times and puzzles for other publications. In 1984, he founded 1 Across magazine as a way of providing more of his puzzles to subscribers who wanted them; the magazine still publishes five crosswords monthly: four new puzzles by various setters, and one by Araucaria taken from the extensive 1 Across archive.

He took his pseudonym from the monkey-puzzle tree, whose Latin name is Araucaria araucana. Another name for this tree is the "Chile Pine", of which "Cinephile" is an anagram, demonstrating his love for film.

Graham lived in Somersham, Cambridgeshire. He was made a Member of the Order of the British Empire in the 2005 New Year's Honours, for services to the newspaper industry. In July 2011 Graham was the subject of the BBC radio programme Desert Island Discs, in which he revealed that he always used Scrabble tiles as an aid when compiling.

The December 2012 issue of 1 Across magazine printed an Araucaria puzzle which revealed that Graham had oesophageal cancer. The puzzle was reprinted as Guardian cryptic No. 25,842 on 11 January 2013. The puzzle had a supplementary narrative beginning "Araucaria has 18 down of the 19, which is being treated with 13 15". Those who solved the puzzle found the answer to 18 down was "cancer", to 19 "oesophagus", and to 13 and 15 "palliative" and "care". Other clues had answers such as "Macmillan Nurse", "stent", "chemotherapy", "endoscopy" and "sunset". Araucaria said this particular puzzle had not taken him very long, adding that a crossword had seemed the most fitting way to make the announcement. "It seemed the natural thing to do somehow," he said. "It just seemed right."

The last Araucaria puzzle published before Graham's death also had some hidden meanings: it included answers such as "cottage hospital", "nil by mouth" and "time to go". Fellow Guardian crossword compiler and friend Sandy Balfour was with Graham on the night of his death, reading to him. A year after his death, on 27 November 2014, The Guardian published a crossword with the grid and some clues compiled by him but completed by his friend and fellow compiler 'Philistine'. He was described as having a "mischievous erudition, humility and courage."

== Style ==
Graham's clue-writing style made him one of the best-loved of all setters. His style falls into a grouping sometimes referred to as "Araucarian". This style, of which The Guardian's Bunthorne was another notable exponent, has influenced most of the current crop of Guardian setters and contrasts with the more rigid "Ximenean" style favoured by The Times.

Widely admired for his clever use of cross-references and special themes, he was usually called upon to produce the extra-large puzzles printed in The Guardian on bank holidays; these sometimes even included two grids, with complicated rules governing the placing of answers in each.

He is also credited with creating a new format of crossword, the "alphabetical jigsaw" in which the clues are labelled with letters rather than numbers, and the grid has no markers to indicate the placement of solutions. Instead the clues are arranged in alphabetical order of their answer – usually labelled with the beginning letter, with either one or two clues for each letter. The answers are to be placed "jigsaw-wise, however they may fit," though of course only one arrangement will work. These puzzles have been christened 'araubeticals' by fans on the crossword website www.fifteensquared.net. Araucaria's clues to the alphabetical jigsaws are often in the form of rhyming couplets in iambic pentameter. In a few puzzles, an additional clue is given which describes a phrase or set of words placed around the edge of the grid (alternate squares of the perimeter being black) to give a starting point for placing some of the answers.

His clues often included long anagrams, with a famous one (which he went as far as to say he was 'modestly proud' of) appearing in the Guardian's cryptic crossword 16,176:

O hark! the herald angels sing the Boy's descent which lifted up the world (anag), and in what circumstances (5,9,7,5,6,2,5,3,6,2,3,6),

which contains an anagram of "While shepherds watched their flocks by night, all seated on the ground" (surprisingly, this did not appear in a Christmas special crossword, but instead in a routine mid-week puzzle).

Another much-quoted example of his brilliance in clue-setting is the following:

Poetical scene with surprisingly chaste Lord Archer vegetating (3, 3, 8, 12)

which yields "The Old Vicarage, Grantchester". This is the title of a poem by Rupert Brooke. The anagram was a topical reference to Jeffrey Archer who was the vicarage's current owner and was lying low there at the time following a sex scandal.

== Books ==
Several collections of his crosswords have been published. His crosswords have also been included in many other compilations, not listed here.

- Monkey Puzzles (2002)
- Monkey Puzzles volume 2 (2004)
- Chambers Book of Araucaria Crosswords Volume 1 (2003)
- Chambers Book of Araucaria Crosswords Volume 2 (2005)
- Chambers Book of Araucaria Crosswords Volume 3 (2006)
- Chambers Book of Araucaria Crosswords Volume 4 (2008)
