= Sarah Hayes (crossword compiler) =

British crossword setter

- Other names: Arachne (Guardian, others); Anarche (Independent); Rosa Klebb (Financial Times); Aranya (New Statesman)
- Occupation: Crossword setter

Sarah Hayes, usually known as Arachne, is a British cryptic crossword setter. She sets puzzles for The Guardian, The Independent (as Anarche), the Financial Times (as Rosa Klebb), the New Statesman (as Aranya), and The Times, and advanced cryptics for The Listener crossword (The Times), Enigmatic Variations (The Daily Telegraph) and the Inquisitor (The Independent). Hayes's clues are often smutty or political and make frequent use of the generic she.

== Biography ==
Hayes holds an MPhil in Russian and between 1979 and 1997 was a lecturer in Russian studies at the Victoria University of Manchester, where she published A Study of English Nautical Loanwords in the Russian Language of the Eighteenth Century. Hayes's first crossword was published in the Independent Saturday Magazine on 25 May 1996, and after setting some advanced barred grid cryptics for various papers on a freelance basis, she was hired by The Guardian to help set up their beginner-level "Quiptic" crossword. From there, she got a regular slot in The Guardian and other broadsheets. Hayes also took part in the BBC Radio 4 series David Baddiel Tries to Understand..., setting a beginner's crossword for the show and putting together a guide to solving cryptics.

After retiring as a lecturer in 1997, Hayes studied for a diploma in intelligence and international relations. She currently lives in Burnage, Manchester, and for several years ran an online bookshop with her husband Nick.

== Style ==
Hayes describes herself as an "anarcho-horizontalist" and her crosswords often reflect her political leanings – one of her most often cited clues reads "Throw shoe! Bugger invaded Iraq! (6,4)", which has the solution GEORGE BUSH (an anagram of "shoe bugger") and references the Bush shoeing incident. Her other political crosswords have commented on current affairs, such as a puzzle in The Independent during the Leveson inquiry that referenced many of the main players in the case, or drawn attention to injustices: one puzzle included hidden messages "JUSTICE NOT DONE" and "DANIEL MORGAN" in the form of ninas as part of a campaign against police corruption, while another included the names of undercover police officers from the Special Demonstration Squad who had deceived protesters into sexual relationships.

After her clue "Woman in charge of automobile club (6)" (DRIVER, a double definition of "motorist" and "golf club") proved surprisingly controversial, Hayes has also made a point of including women and the generic she where possible in clues.

Arachne puzzles often use sexual innuendo, to the extent that she is sometimes reined back by her editors.

== Pseudonyms ==
Her Guardian pseudonym, also used in The Listener and other puzzles, is drawn from the mythical Greek weaver Arachne, and references her hobby of amateur weaving. "Anarche", used in The Independent, is an anagram of "Arachne" and hints at her political views. "Rosa Klebb", used in the Financial Times, is taken from the James Bond villain, and references Hayes's background in Russian and her politics – the name is itself a pun on the Soviet feminist slogan khleb i rozy. "Aranya", her pseudonym in the New Statesman, is the Catalan for "spider".
