= Lollapuzzoola =

Crossword-solving tournament

An American-style crossword with a 15×15 grid layout.

Lollapuzzoola is a crossword-solving tournament held annually on a Saturday in August. Founded in 2008 by Brian Cimmet and Ryan Hecht, it is the second-largest crossword tournament in the United States, and the only major tournament in New York City. The term "Lollapuzzoola" was coined by Amanda Yesnowitz, as a play on the Lollapalooza music festival. Lollapuzzoola 18 took place on August 9, 2025, and was cohosted by Brian Cimmet and Brooke Husic.

For its first three years, Lollapuzzoola was held at the First Methodist Church in Jackson Heights, New York, but owing to its increasing popularity, in 2011 the tournament moved to All Souls Church in New York, New York. In 2018, the tournament relocated again, still within New York City, to Riverside Church.

Lollapuzzoola typically consists of a main slate of five themed crosswords followed by a championship final puzzle in two skill divisions. There are many other games and puzzles throughout the day, including a pre-tournament social mixer, a multi-crossword meta suite, and a variety puzzle suite. Puzzles are commissioned by the tournament, and are designed to fit a full-day theme, giving the tournament a certain unity. Themes have included Theme Park (2024), Sweet 16 (2023, for the tournament's 16th year), Television (2020, when the COVID pandemic forced the tournament online), and The Olympics (2017). Crossword constructors who have contributed to Lollapuzzoola include Erik Agard, Brendan Emmett Quigley, Peter Gordon, Patrick Berry, Ashish Vengsarkar, Dan Feyer, Doug Peterson, Mike Nothnagel, Tony Orbach, Barry C. Silk, Elizabeth C. Gorski, Karen M. Tracey, Byron Walden, Andrea Carla Michaels, Deb Amlen, Matt Gaffney, Joe Krozel, Neville Fogarty, Patrick Blindauer, Joon Pahk, Aimee Lucido, Zoe Wheeler, Kevin Der, and Tyler Hinman.

Lollapuzzoola and its founders are discussed in David Astle's book "Puzzled." Lollapuzzoola has also been frequently mentioned on the weekly crossword podcast Fill Me In, which is cohosted by Cimmet and Hecht.

Four times during Lollapuzzoola's history, New York Times crossword editor Will Shortz purchased puzzles commissioned for the tournament for publication in the newspaper. On September 5, 2009, Mike Nothnagel's final puzzle from Lollapuzzoola 2 was published in the New York Times (see XWordInfo.com page). On August 20, 2011, Byron Walden's final puzzle from Lollapuzzoola 4 was published (see XWordInfo.com page). On September 11, 2014, Patrick Blindauer's puzzle "Change of Heart" from Lollapuzzoola 7 was published (see XWordInfo.com page). On August 9, 2016, Andrea Carla Michaels's puzzle from Lollapuzzoola 4 was published in advance of the upcoming tournament, and (in part) as a promotion of Lollapuzzoola (see XWordInfo.com page). Each time, an additional block of text was added to the puzzle to tell solvers that this puzzle had appeared in a national tournament and to give information about the winner and their solving speed. In the case of Walden's puzzle, the byline was extended to include "edited by Brian Cimmet and Patrick Blindauer", the first instance of an editor besides Shortz since he began working for the Times.

Mark Goodliffe, a British puzzle solver who broadcasts on his YouTube channel "Cracking the Cryptic" solved a Lollapuzzoola puzzle online in 2021. Wyna Liu discussed one of Lollapuzzoola's puzzles at length in her article "The Loading ... Puzzle" in 2022. Hayley Gold wrote about Lollapuzzoola 15 in her article "A Crossword Tournament Returns to NYC for its Quinceañera" in 2022.

== Participants and divisions ==
Anyone can participate. There are two skill divisions, a rookie division, a pairs division, and for those who can't attend in person, an at-home division. Prizes are awarded in all divisions, with trophies and cash/gift certificate prizes for the top winners in the two skill divisions. For the purposes of prizes contestants compete simultaneously in all divisions for which they are eligible, with no more than one cash prize per contestant.

Division	Definition
Express	Everyone
Local	Contestants who have not ranked in the top 20% at either the American Crossword Puzzle Tournament or a previous Lollapuzzoola in the last three years.
Pairs	Contestants can work in groups of two, but do not qualify for the Express, Local, or Rookie Division prizes.
At-Home	Contestants can solve from home (via an emailed PDF), but do not qualify for the Express, Local, Pairs, or Rookie Division prizes.
Down Clues Only	Players may voluntarily enter this division, in which they are only given the down clues for each puzzle.
Rookies	Contestants competing for their first time at any tournament. (This has not been offered as a separate division since 2019.)

== Format ==
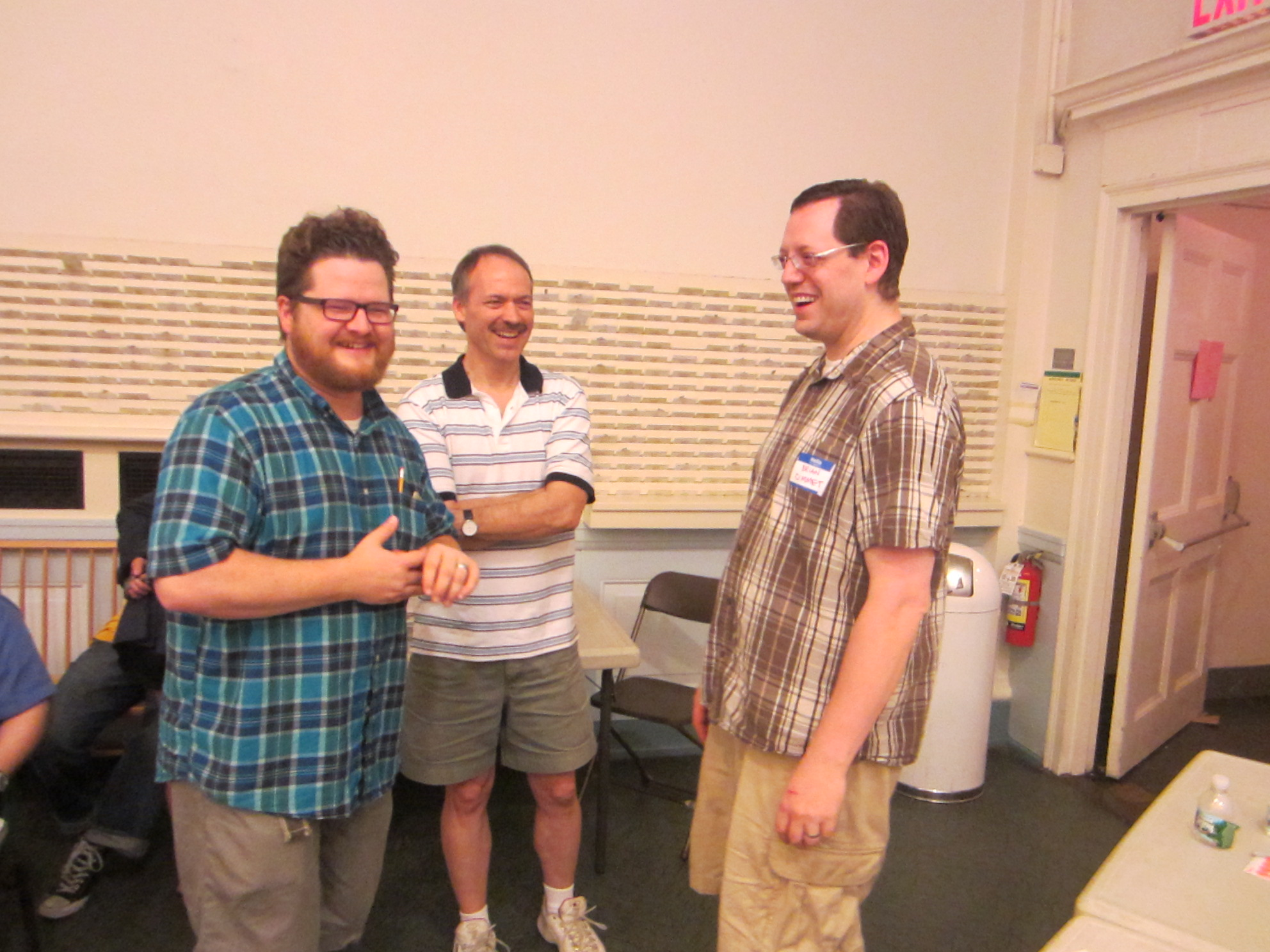
L-R: Patrick Blindauer, Will Shortz, and Brian Cimmet.

The tournament consists of five rounds, each with a puzzle that all competitors solve. There are three rounds in the morning and two in the early afternoon. Puzzles vary in size and difficulty from round to round. The puzzles are commissioned by the tournament directors from the top constructors in crosswords, with the fourth puzzle the hardest of the set. The puzzles vary in size, shape, and difficulty, although the first one is traditionally a relatively easy 15x15 grid. The puzzles are always themed, and frequently themed in off-center, wacky ways not commonly seen in newspaper-published crosswords. For example, puzzles have included a "Name That Tune" gimmick; a post-solve Twister game; a puzzle that instructs the solver to eat a Chips Ahoy cookie upon completion; and a puzzle that required the entire room of solvers to make noises from their chairs, and thus perform an impromptu rendition of John Cage's 4'33''. Judges score the solved puzzles on accuracy and speed.

After these five rounds, the top three solvers in the two skill divisions progress to the final round, which consists of solving a very difficult crossword on an oversize grid onstage at the front of the room. The competitors in this round wear noise-blocking headphones. The solvers hold a sheet of clues and write their answers on the grid with a dry-erase marker for all to see. The competitors are ranked by fewest mistakes, then time. The winner of this round is declared the champion. The top three competitors in the Express and Local divisions compete on the same puzzle with different sets of clues for their titles.

== Tournament history ==
Date	Title	Location	Constructors
August 23, 2008	Lollapuzzoola	Jackson Heights, NY	Brian Cimmet (1), Dan Feyer (2), Mike Nothnagel (3), Doug Peterson (4), Barry C. Silk (5), Ashish Vengsarkar (6)
August 22, 2009	Lollapuzzoola 2: Son of Puzzoola	Jackson Heights, NY	Todd McClary (1), Brian Cimmet (2), Peter Gordon (3), Brendan Emmett Quigley (4), Doug Peterson (5), Mike Nothnagel (finals)
August 14, 2010	Lollapuzzoola 3: The Great Pickle Giveaway	Jackson Heights, NY	Deb Amlen (1), Mike Nothnagel (2), Joe Krozel (3), Tyler Hinman (4), Neville Fogarty (5), Doug Peterson (finals)
August 6, 2011	Lollapuzzoola 4: Crosswords Take Manhattan	New York, NY	Andrea Carla Michaels (1), Patrick Blindauer and Tony Orbach (2), Doug Peterson (3), Mike Nothnagel (4), Elizabeth C. Gorski (5), Byron Walden (finals)
August 4, 2012	Lollapuzzoola 5: Amanda Goes Express	New York, NY	Tony Orbach and Patrick Blindauer (1), Mike Nothnagel (2), Elizabeth C. Gorski (3), Matt Gaffney (4), Doug Peterson (5), Karen M. Tracey (finals)
August 10, 2013	Lollapuzzoola 6: Words, Nerds, and Birds (NO BIRDS)	New York, NY	Aimee Lucido and Zoe Wheeler (1), Mike Nothnagel (2), Patrick Blindauer and Tony Orbach (3), Kevin G. Der (4), Doug Peterson (5), joon pahk (finals)
August 9, 2014	Lollapuzzoola 7: It Ain't Over 'til It's Over	New York, NY	Cathy Allis (1), Mike Nothnagel (2), Tony Orbach (3), Patrick Blindauer (4), Doug Peterson (5), Patrick Berry (finals)
August 8, 2015	Lollapuzzoola 8? LOLLAPUZZOCHO!	New York, NY	Patrick Blindauer (1), Anna Shechtman (2), Mike Nothnagel (3), joon pahk (4), Doug Peterson (5), Kevin G. Der (finals)
August 13, 2016	Lollapuzzoola 9: It's Hip to Be Squared	New York, NY	Mike Nothnagel (1), Patrick Blindauer (2), Doug Peterson (3), Evan Birnholz (4), Francis Heaney (5), Sam Donaldson (finals)
August 19, 2017	Lollapuzzoola 10: Passing the Torch	New York, NY	Paolo Pasco (1), C.C. Burnikel (2), Erik Agard (3), Francis Heaney (4), joon pahk (5), Mike Nothnagel and Doug Peterson (finals)
August 18, 2018	Lollapuzzoola 11: Back to School	New York, NY	Aimee Lucido (1), Erik Agard and Yacob Yonas (2), Patti Varol (3), Jeff Chen (4), Paolo Pasco (5), Mike Nothnagel and Doug Peterson (finals)
August 17, 2019	Lollapuzzoola 12: Be Part of the Future	New York, NY	C.C. Burnikel (1), Stella Zawistowski (2), Paolo Pasco (3), Maddie Gillespie and Doug Peterson (4), Robyn Weintraub (5), Mike Nothnagel (finals)
August 15, 2020	Lollapuzzoola 13: Don't Touch That Dial!	online only	Brooke Husic (1), Sid Sivakumar (2), Rachel Fabi (3), joon pahk (4), Stella Zawistowski (5), Robyn Weintraub (finals)
August 21, 2021	Lollapuzzoola 14: This Time, It's Virtual ... Again.	online only	Robyn Weintraub (1), Amanda Rafkin (2), Sid Sivakumar (3), Brooke Husic (4), Patti Varol (5), Wyna Liu (finals)
August 27, 2022	Lollapuzzoola 15: Live From New York ... It's Saturday!	New York, NY and online	Pao Roy (1), Ella Dershowitz (2), Paolo Pasco (3), Francis Heaney (4), Will Nediger (5), Brooke Husic (finals)
August 19, 2023	Lollapuzzoola's Sweet 16	New York, NY	Matthew Gritzmacher & Doug Peterson (1), Sara Cantor (2), Ricky Cruz (3), Kevin G. Der (4), Rebecca Goldstein (5), Erica Hsiung Wojcik (finals)
August 24, 2024	Lollapuzzoola 17: Theme Park	New York, NY	Madeline Kaplan (1), Doug Peterson (2), Adam Aaronson & Alina Abidi (3), Hoang-Kim Vu (4), Chandi Deitmer (5), Neville Fogarty (finals)
August 9, 2025	Lollapuzzoola 18: We put the zoo in Lollapuzzoola	New York, NY	Hannah Slovut-Einertson (1), Mark Valdez (2), Kate Hawkins (3), Brooke Husic (4), Kareem Ayas (5), Malaika Handa (finals)
August 15, 2026	Lollapuzzoola 19: Around the World	New York, NY	Trenton Charlson, Carina da Rosa, Will Nediger, Ada Nicolle, Adam Wagner, Amie Walker

== Past champions and finalists ==
As of 2023, there have been two repeat winners: Jeffrey Harris and Will Nediger. Past champions traditionally return in subsequent years as judges and/or constructors.

Year	Express Division			Local Division Winner	Pairs/Group Division Winners	Rookie of the Year	At-Home Division Winner
Year	1st	2nd	3rd	Local Division Winner	Pairs/Group Division Winners	Rookie of the Year	At-Home Division Winner
2008	Howard Barkin	Will Irving	Patty Buethe	[n/a]	[n/a]	[n/a]	[n/a]
2009	Dan Feyer	Francis Heaney	Howard Barkin	Will Irving	[n/a]	Matthew Matera	[n/a]
2010	Jeffrey Harris	joon pahk	Jon Delfin	Jeffrey Dubner	Amy Goldstein & Evan O'Donnell	Maureen Rekrut	[n/a]
2011	Jeffrey Harris	Dave Tuller	Al Sanders	Andy Kravis	Amy Goldstein & Evan O'Donnell	David Blake	Anne Ellison
2012	joon pahk	Francis Heaney	Kiran Kedlaya	Glen Ryan	Peter Coe & Caitlin Van Ness	Glen Ryan	David Plotkin
2013	Al Sanders	Francis Heaney	Trip Payne	Jonathon Brown	Julian Ochrymowych & Marcia Hearst	Jonathon Brown	David Plotkin
2014	Jon Delfin	Francis Heaney	Scott Weiss	Patti Varol	Julian Ochrymowych & Marcia Hearst	Rebecca Moody	Trip Payne
2015	Francis Heaney	Trip Payne	Erik Agard	Simon Porzak	Julian Ochrymowych & Marcia Hearst	Seth Kleinerman	David Plotkin
2016	Erik Agard	Eric Maddy	Kiran Kedlaya	Paolo Pasco	Julian Ochrymowych & Marcia Hearst	Paolo Pasco	David Plotkin
2017	Andy Kravis	Glen Ryan	Eric Maddy	Simon McAndrews	Michael Sharp & Penelope Harper	Matt Gritzmacher	David Plotkin
2018	Stella Zawistowski	Glen Ryan	Sam Ezersky	Joseph Burke	Peter & Claire Rimkus	Hannah Krug	David Plotkin
2019	Simon Porzak	Katie Hamill	Al Sanders	Kathryne Bevilacqua	Evan Birnholz & Vicki Jones	Kathryne Bevilacqua	David Plotkin
2020	David Plotkin	Jeff Davidson	Jenna LaFleur	Ryan Booker	Kevin Carde, Vivian Kuperberg & Yuval Wigderson	[not awarded]	[n/a]
2021	Will Nediger	Tyler Hinman	Jeff Davidson	Roman Koshykar	Vivian Kuperberg & Yuval Wigderson	[not awarded]	[n/a]
2022	Matt Gritzmacher	Max Kurzman	Gavin Byrnes	Ada Nicolle	Peter & Claire Rimkus	[not awarded]	Tyler Hinman
2023	Will Nediger	Dan Schwartz	Jenna LaFleur	Simon Henriques	Peter & Claire Rimkus	[not awarded]	Paolo Pasco
2024	Ada Nicolle	Dan Schwartz	Allegra Kuney	John Kromer	Sam Mattson & Max Blechman	[not awarded]	Will Nediger
2025	Jenna LaFleur	Dan Schwartz	Glen Ryan	Patrick Kingchatchaval	Shannon Rapp & Will Eisenberg	[not awarded]	Will Nediger
2026	Glen Ryan	Stella Zawistowski	Ryan Judge	Zachary Obsniuk	Patrick Aquino & Christopher Adams	[not awarded]	Chris Baker
