= Douglas Hoylman =

American crossword solver (1943–2015)

- Born: Douglas John Hoylman; July 2, 1943; Kalispell, Montana, U.S.
- Died: November 2, 2015 (aged 72); Chevy Chase, Maryland, U.S.
- Education: Massachusetts Institute of Technology (BS); University of Arizona (PhD)
- Occupations: Actuary; crossword solver
- Known for: 6× American Crossword Puzzle Tournament champion (1988, 1992, 1994, 1996, 1997, 2000)

Douglas John Hoylman (July 2, 1943 – November 2, 2015) was an American competitive crossword puzzle solver. He was the first six-time American Crossword Puzzle Tournament (ACPT) champion (since surpassed by Jon Delfin, Tyler Hinman, and Dan Feyer).

== Life and career ==
Hoylman was born in Kalispell, Montana, to Nona Marie (née Velten) and Byron G. Hoylman, and had a younger brother. His parents ran a heating and air conditioning business. He grew up as a "self-described 'typical nerd'", "solitary kind of person", and big reader. He began solving crosswords around age ten, taking after his mother, and also became a competitive Scrabble and Trivial Pursuit player.

Hoylman graduated from Flathead High School in Kalispell in 1960. He received his bachelor's degree in mathematics from the Massachusetts Institute of Technology in 1964. He earned his PhD in mathematics at the University of Arizona in 1969. He eventually settled in Chevy Chase, Maryland, where he worked as an actuary for the insurance company GEICO, retiring in the 1990s.

Hoylman began competing in crossword tournaments in 1986. He won the American Crossword Puzzle Tournament (ACPT) for the first time in 1988, defeating Jon Delfin and Ellen Ripstein in the final with a time under 11 minutes. He added subsequent victories in 1992, 1994, 1996, 1997, and 2000. ACPT director Will Shortz said Hoylman became known for "his cool, deliberate manner of solving ... His nickname was 'Iceman'. When you'd watch him on the big board during the playoff round, he seemed to be moving so slowly that you'd think he couldn't possibly win. So you'd watch the other contestants instead. Then you'd look back and Doug would be way ahead of everyone else, and you'd think, 'How'd he do that?'" With his last win in 2000, he became the oldest champion in ACPT history (aged 56) and the first six-time winner (since surpassed by Delfin, Tyler Hinman, and Dan Feyer).

Hoylman died of heart disease at his home in Chevy Chase, Maryland, at the age of 72 on November 2, 2015. That year, he placed in the top 40 at the ACPT.
