= Wyna Liu =

American puzzle creator

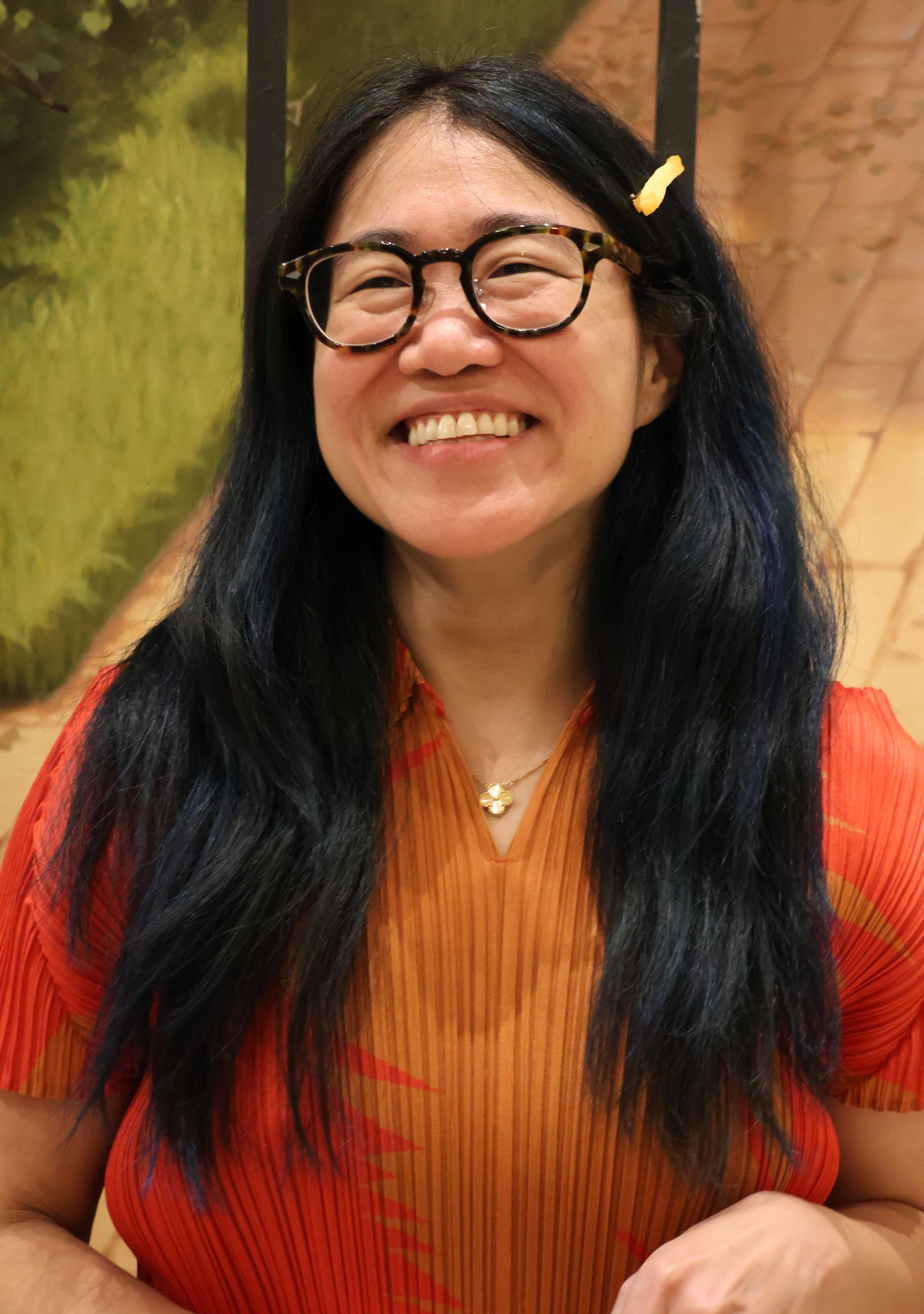
- Liu at the 2024 American Crossword Puzzle Tournament
- Education: Oberlin College (B.A.); NYU's Interactive Telecommunications Program (M.A.)
- Occupations: Puzzle editor; jewelry artist
- Known for: The New York Times Connections
- Website: www.wynaliu.com

Wyna Liu (/ˈwɪnə ˈluː/ WIN-ə LOO) is an American puzzle curator and editor of the New York Times game Connections.

== Career ==
Liu's introduction to puzzles was reading Games magazines as a child. In her late 20s, she began solving crosswords, namely the puzzles of Brendan Emmett Quigley. She regards these events as the main contributors to her love of puzzles.

In 2017, Liu and her mother attended a seven-night New York Times crossword-themed cruise, where she met Times editor Joel Fagliano and became inspired to begin constructing her own puzzles. In 2018 she met the constructors Erik Agard and Ben Tausig, who began mentoring her.

Her first published crossword puzzle appeared in the American Values Club Crossword in January 2019. Her first New York Times crossword was published in February 2019.

In 2020, Liu was hired as an associate puzzle editor in the New York Times games department. She is also an assistant editor at the American Values Club Crossword. In 2022, Liu constructed the final round puzzle for the American Crossword Puzzle Tournament.

Liu is the editor of Connections, a New York Times game officially introduced in 2023. Since its inception, Connections has been one of the most popular games on the New York Times list. Liu constructs boards for the game herself and releases them daily. Liu has commented that she largely stays away from social media and instead hears people's opinions of her puzzles through her friends and colleagues.

== Personal life ==
Liu attended Oberlin College, where she taught an experimental course on the history of Britpop. In 2014, she earned a master's degree from NYU's Interactive Telecommunications Program.

As of 2020, Liu was a resident of Chinatown in Manhattan, New York. Liu is an artist who uses "laser cutting and traditional craft techniques to create fluid and movable sculptures." She also designs jewelry.
