= Matt Gaffney =

American crossword constructor and author

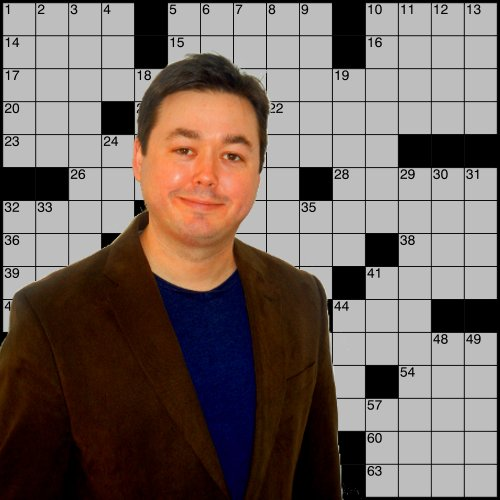
- Born: November 13, 1972 (age 53); Washington, D.C.
- Occupation: Crossword constructor
- Spouse: Kristin Goins Gaffney
- Children: 2

Matt Gaffney is a professional crossword puzzle constructor and author who lives in Staunton, Virginia. His puzzles have appeared in Billboard magazine, the Chicago Tribune, the Daily Beast, Dell Champion Crossword Puzzles, GAMES magazine, the Los Angeles Times, New York magazine, the New York Times, Newsday, The Onion, Slate magazine, the Wall Street Journal, the Washington Post, Washingtonian Magazine, The Week, and Wine Spectator.

Gaffney was thirteen when his first crossword puzzle was published in Dell Champion Crossword Puzzles, and has gone on to create more than 4,000 crossword puzzles over the past 25 years. His puzzles have been published in the New York Times 58 times. He has served as judge for Will Shortz's American Crossword Puzzle Tournament and won the Junior division as a contestant in 1997. He has created puzzles for Lollapuzzoola and guest-constructed for Brendan Emmett Quigley. He was previously a contributor to the Onion A.V. Club crossword, edited by Ben Tausig. Since June 6, 2008, he has created a weekly crossword puzzle contest (MGWCC), and since September 21, 2011, he has created a daily crossword puzzle (MGDC). On October 11, 2013, Gaffney started a Gaffney on Crosswords blog covering all things crossword related. In July 2014 Gaffney's "Murder by Meta" Kickstarter project was released. In July 2023 Gaffney created a weekly crossword for Merriam-Webster’s website. It’s a puzzle type called "The Missing Letter". Twenty five entries in the grid are defined using their Merriam-Webster dictionary definition, and these each begin with a different letter of the alphabet. The only one not represented each week is "The Missing Letter".

== Matt Gaffney's Weekly Crossword Contest ==
MGWCC is a combination crossword puzzle and "metapuzzle" (puzzle within a puzzle). It is posted every Friday afternoon and solvers generally have until the next Tuesday at noon to submit the correct answer. Instructions are provided each week, and the difficulty level increases as the month progresses. The first Friday of the month is about the level of a Monday New York Times Puzzle, where the last Friday of the month is about the Saturday New York Times (or harder) difficulty level. There are prizes awarded weekly and monthly; normally a customized MGWCC pen, pencil and notepad set. Once the weekly deadline passes, Joon Pahk provides a writeup and summary on the Diary of a Crossword Fiend blog where MGWCC #169 entitled "Moving Day" won the 2011 Puzzle of the Year Award and Gaffney won the 2012 Constructor of the Year Award.

MGWCC celebrated 5 years of puzzles on June 14, 2013 with MGWCC #263 "Bring Forth the Fourth". Gaffney has stated the MGWCC will run for exactly 1,000 weeks, meaning the last one will be published on Friday, Aug. 6, 2027.

== Timothy Parker crossword scandal ==
On March 4, 2016, the website FiveThirtyEight said it had found similarities between puzzles Timothy Parker had edited and published through USA Today and Universal Uclick (now Andrews McMeel Syndication) and ones previously published. Parker said he had not deliberately copied any puzzles, but Gaffney's Slate article "How to Spot a Plagiarized Crossword" presents evidence to the contrary. It was confirmed in mid-March that Parker had stepped back as an editor for USA Today and Universal. On April 18, 2016, Universal Uclick announced that it had confirmed some of the allegations and that Parker would take a three-month leave of absence. It stated that he would "(confirm) that his process for constructing puzzles uses the best available technology to ensure that everything he edits is original". On May 10, 2016, USA Today, and its parent company Gannett, announced that they would not publish any future puzzles from Parker, though they would continue to receive their puzzles from Universal Uclick. At the end of 2018, Universal Uclick declined to renew its contract with Parker.

== Publications ==
Author

- Gridlock: Crossword Puzzles and the Mad Geniuses Who Create Them
- The Brain Works: 20-Minute While-You-Wait Crossword Puzzles
- The Brain Works 20-Minute On-the-Road Traveling Crossword Puzzles
- The Complete Idiot's Guide to Crossword Puzzles and Word Games
- The Pocket Idiot's Guide to Brain Games
- The Pocket Idiot's Guide to Kaidoku
- Sip & Solve: Hard Crosswords (Hard Crosswords)
- Sip & Solve: Hard Crosswords (Commuter Crosswords)
- Golf Crosswords
- mental_floss Crosswords: Rich, Mouthwatering Puzzles You Need to Unwrap Immediately!
- The Complete Idiot's Guide to Word Search Puzzles
- The Complete Idiot's Guide to More Word Search Puzzles
- Bite-Size Crosswords

Co-author

- The Complete Idiot's Guide to Spanish - English Crossword Puzzles
- Sweet Smell of Crosswords
- USA Today Sports Crosswords

Editor

- USA TODAY Movie Crosswords
- Classic Movie Crosswords
- Sports Crosswords: 50 All-New All-Star Puzzles
- Literary Crosswords: 50 All-New Puzzles from Austen to Zola
- Gaffney, Matt. Gridlock: Crossword Puzzles and the Mad Geniuses Who Create Them. New York: Thunder's Mouth Press, 2006, p. 87
- "XWI -- Matt Gaffney thumbnails"
