= United States Open (crosswords) =

Crossword-solving tournament

The United States Open was a crossword puzzle-solving tournament that lasted from 1982 (44 years ago) to 1986 (40 years ago). Sponsored by Games Magazine and directed by Will Shortz, it attracted thousands of potential competitors and was, along with the American Crossword Puzzle Tournament, one of the two largest crossword tournaments in recent decades.

A qualifying puzzle ran in Games Magazine. Solvers of the puzzle could decide whether they wanted to be Nonparticipants or Participants. Nonparticipants with correct solutions were eligible for a random drawing, the winner of which would receive a cash prize. Participants with correct solutions were mailed four very difficult tiebreaker crosswords, many of which had deliberately tricky crossings and unannounced gimmicks (for example, the long entries in a puzzle might reveal that all of the across clues were in reverse order). The 250 solvers with the best scores on the tiebreak puzzles were invited to New York City to participate in the tournament.

First prize at the tournament was $1500 and a six-foot-tall pencil.

== Tournament history ==
Year	Contestants	Location	Winner	Runners-up (in order)	Ref.
1982	250	New York City	Stanley Newman	Rebecca Kornbluh, John Chervetes	
1983	260	New York City	John McNeill		
1984	250	New York City	Rebecca Kornbluh	John McNeill, Stanley Newman	
1985	271	New York City	Rebecca Kornbluh (2)	Ellen Ripstein, Stanley Newman	
1986	247	New York City	Rebecca Kornbluh (3)	Jon Delfin, George Henschel	
