= Manny Nosowsky =

American crossword constructor (1932–2026)

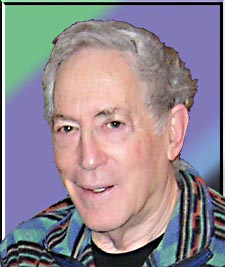
0.8

Emanuel Ezra Nosowsky (January 3, 1932 – May 20, 2026) was an American crossword puzzle creator. A medical doctor by training, he retired from a San Francisco urology practice and, beginning in 1991, created crossword puzzles that have been published in The New York Times, the Wall Street Journal, and many other newspapers. Will Shortz, the crossword puzzle editor for The New York Times, has described Nosowsky as "a national treasure" and included four Nosowsky puzzles in his 2002 book Will Shortz's Favorite Crossword Puzzles. Nosowsky had 254 crossword puzzles published in the Times, ranking him fourth all-time at the time of his death, despite not having had a puzzle published there since 2010. Nosowsky also produced a number of puzzles for the American Crossword Puzzle Tournament.

== Crossword career ==
Nosowsky was known for constructing puzzles with wide-open grids, often published later in the week, for expert solvers. On July 24, 1998, he set an early record by publishing a standard 15x15 daily crossword puzzle with only 21 black squares. This record stood until 2001, when Joe DiPietro published a 20-black-square puzzle. On March 11, 2005, the Times published a Nosowsky puzzle that set the new record: 19 black squares; this record was finally broken on August 22, 2008, when an 18-black-square puzzle by Kevin Der was published. On a popular web site for crossword constructors, Nosowsky published an article describing his method for making the record-breaking puzzle; he also was featured discussing the puzzle in the bonus material for the DVD of the 2006 documentary Wordplay.

His puzzle "Double Digit Inflation" was the first to be published in the Wall Street Journal, which now has a crossword as a weekly feature.

He worked to encourage new puzzle constructors to the field, particularly through contributions to cruciverb.com. In one article, he argued for the importance of "sparkle" in a puzzle's construction. He was recognized for clever, sometimes misleading (though "fair"), clues for puzzle entries. Examples include "Browning piece?" for ELECTRIC TOASTER and "Northern air" for O CANADA. His cleverness extends to his themed puzzles, as well. A student of Latin, Nosowsky once produced a puzzle in which common Latin phrases were changed by one letter: QUID PRO QUO became QUID PRO DUO with the jocular clue, "You scratch my back and I'll do the both of us?" In the same puzzle, TABULA NASA was clued as "Blackboard for rocket scientists?" and others followed in a similar vein.

== "Puzzle Lady" mysteries ==
In collaboration with the mystery novelist Parnell Hall, Nosowsky produced puzzles that appear in Hall's "Puzzle Lady" novels, such as You Have the Right to Remain Puzzled. Hall's narrative sets the storyline, and in four of his novels, Nosowsky's puzzles drop clues for the reader.

== Personal life and death ==
Nosowsky was born in San Francisco, California, on January 3, 1932. He resided in the Diamond Heights neighborhood of the city with his wife Debby until his death in San Francisco on May 20, 2026, at the age of 94.
