= Paolo Pasco =

American crossword constructor (born 2000)

- Pasco in 2025
- Born: May 10, 2000 (age 26)
- Education: Harvard University (BA)
- Occupations: Crossword constructor; puzzle editor; game show contestant
- Known for: 2× American Crossword Puzzle Tournament champion (2024, 2025); Jeopardy! Tournament of Champions champion (2026)

Paolo Pasco (born May 10, 2000) is an American crossword puzzle constructor. He is a two-time American Crossword Puzzle Tournament (ACPT) champion, seven-game Jeopardy! champion, and Jeopardy! Tournament of Champions winner. He is the games editor for TED Conferences.

== Early life and education ==
Pasco grew up in San Diego. He is of Filipino descent. He grew up solving volumes of sudoku and Dell crosswords and began solving The New York Times crossword in eighth grade. He also began constructing puzzles in middle school. He attended Santa Fe Christian Schools in Solana Beach, California, where he was co-president of the math club and part of the improv comedy team, graduating in 2018. He graduated from Harvard University with a Bachelor of Arts in computer science in 2022. During college, he wrote for the Hasty Pudding Theatricals and The Harvard Lampoon.

== Crossword constructing and editing ==
Pasco had his first New York Times crossword published in July 2015, becoming one of the youngest constructors in Times history at 15 years old. He has since published more than 25 puzzles in the Times. He became known for his youthful voice as a constructor, often introducing new language and answers to the grid, and his sense of humor. He has also constructed crosswords for other publications, such as The Atlantic, AVCX (formerly the American Values Club), BuzzFeed, Los Angeles Times, The Wall Street Journal, and USA Today. He launched his own crossword blog, Grids These Days, in 2017.

Pasco began an internship at Andrews McMeel Universal in the summer of 2020, helping edit and construct crosswords for the syndicated Universal crossword and USA Today. Later in college, he became an assistant crossword editor at The Atlantic, collaborating with editor Caleb Madison. He has also been an assistant editor at AVCX for many years. In May 2024, he became LinkedIn's inaugural games editor. In August 2025, he became the games editor for TED Conferences.

== Crossword solving ==
Pasco began speed-solving crosswords in high school and won the Lollapuzzoola Local Division at age 16 in 2016. Improving his ability by doing "a sick number of reps", he has said that enough practice helps solvers start to intuit answers: "There's a lot to be said about vibing". He made his American Crossword Puzzle Tournament (ACPT) debut in 2021, placing fourth in the tournament's only virtual edition during the COVID-19 pandemic. He attended the tournament at the Stamford Marriott for the first time in 2022, winning the B Division and placing sixth overall.

In 2023, Pasco finished as ACPT runner-up to nine-time champion Dan Feyer, losing the final by one second after hesitating over his final square. He won his first national crossword title in 2024, defeating David Plotkin and Will Nediger in the final. He defended his title over Nediger and Feyer in 2025, completing the final puzzle in less than four minutes. Gothamist called Pasco a "legend in the world of crossword puzzles".

== Jeopardy! ==
Pasco began studying trivia to improve his geography knowledge after his runner-up finish at ACPT in 2023. In September 2025, he appeared on the television quiz show Jeopardy! and won seven games, for a total of US$195,717 in prize money. With his performance, he earned a berth in the Jeopardy! Tournament of Champions (TOC) in February 2026, where he swept the finals to win the US$250,000 grand prize. The victory gave him a berth in that year's Jeopardy! Masters, where he placed fourth, behind Andrew He, Victoria Groce, and Yogesh Raut, and received US$100,000.
