= Francis Heaney =

American crossword constructor and editor

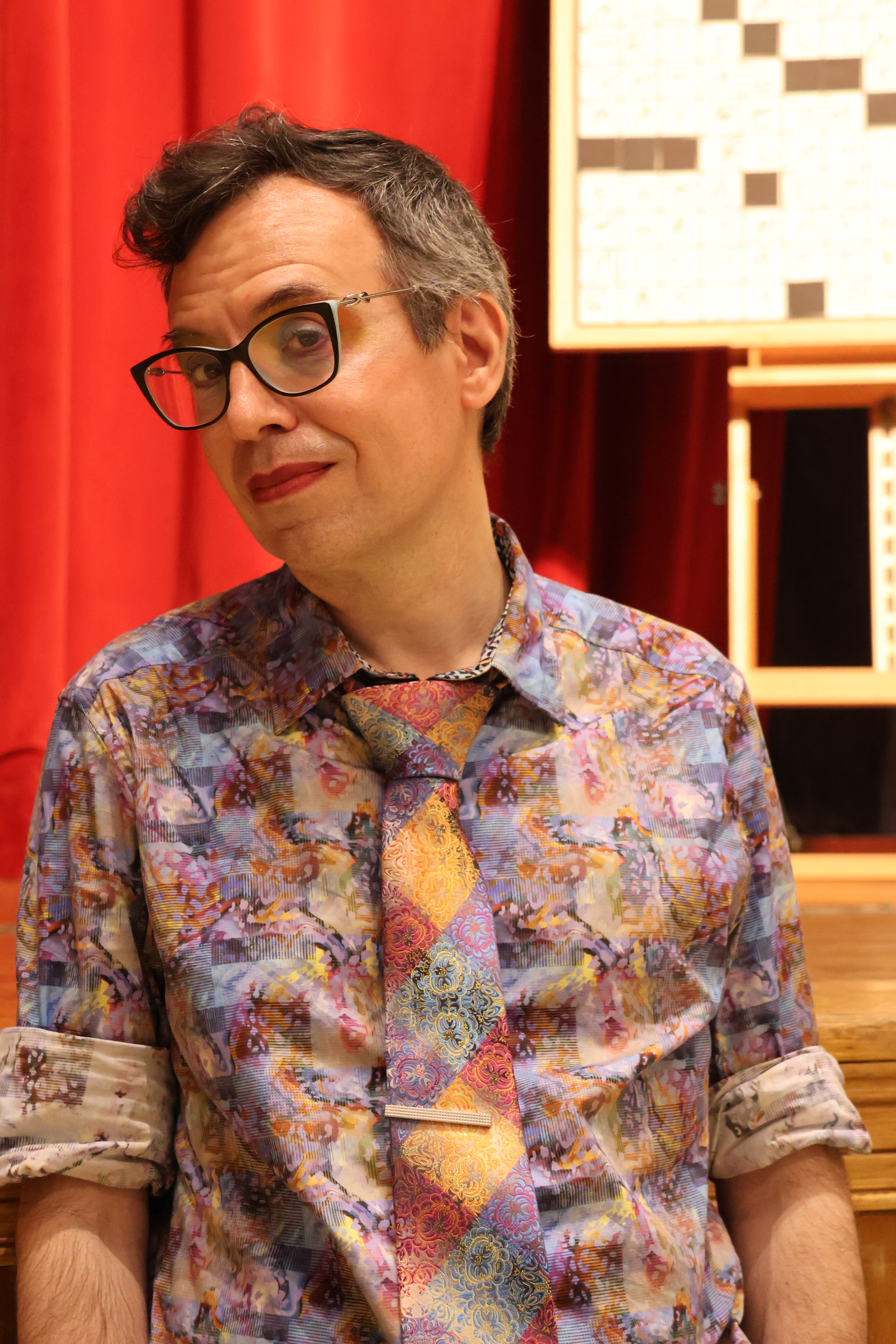
Heaney at Lollapuzzoola in 2023

Francis Heaney is a professional puzzle writer and editor (and a former editor-at-large) for GAMES Magazine, as well as a former editor of Enigma, the official publication of the National Puzzlers' League; the composer and co-lyricist (with playwright James Evans) of the Off-Off-Broadway musical We're All Dead; and the author of the webcomic Six Things.

Heaney finished in third place in the 2007 and 2009 American Crossword Puzzle Tournament out of approximately 700 participants. They won Lollapuzzoola 8 in 2015, after making the finals (but not winning) four previous times (2009, 2012, 2013, and 2014).

In 2004, they published Holy Tango of Literature, a collection of their literary parodies which had previously appeared in Modern Humorist.
