= Helene Hovanec =

American children's puzzle book writer

- Born: Brooklyn, New York, United States
- Known for: Children's puzzle books

Helene Hovanec is a former elementary school teacher who has authored 66 puzzle books, 59 of which are for children.

Hovanec earned a B.S. in Child Development from Cornell University and an M.S. in Early Childhood Education from Hunter College. She taught elementary school in New York and New Jersey. Her children's puzzle books, which are geared for kids between the ages of three and 12, have sold over two million copies worldwide.

In addition to her books Hovanec is involved in the grown-up puzzle world, mainly through her connection to Will Shortz. With Shortz she:

- Met Margaret Farrar, the pioneering crossword editor, and wrote about her contribution to the world of crossword puzzles.
- Helped reinstitute the annual conventions of The National Puzzlers' League.
- Helped form the World Puzzle Championship. She was the coordinator for the first and ninth WPCs and was the chairwoman of the captains' committee for several years.
- Is the coordinator for The American Crossword Puzzle Tournament, the world's oldest and largest event of its kind.

An interview with Hovanec was published on Jim Horne's New York Times Wordplay blog on August 30, 2009.
