= The New York Times Connections =

Daily category-matching puzzle

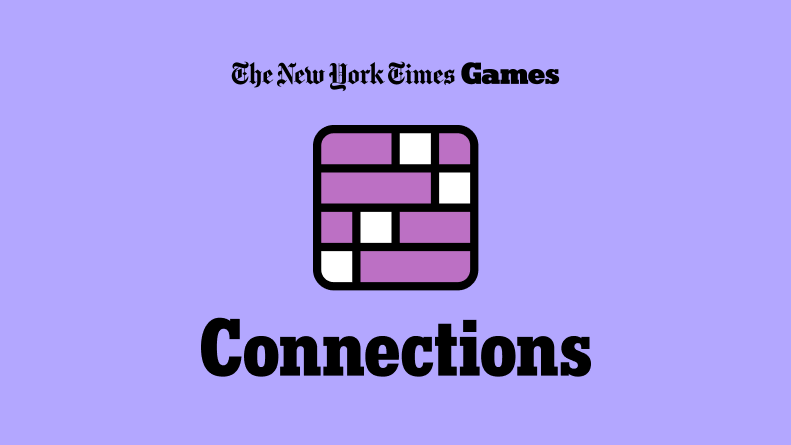
- Developer: The New York Times
- Publisher: The New York Times Games
- Writer: Wyna Liu
- Platforms: Web, iOS, Android
- Release: June 12, 2023
- Genre: Word game
- Mode: Single-player

Connections is a daily category-matching puzzle developed and published by The New York Times as part of The New York Times Games. It was released on June 12, 2023, during its beta phase. It is the second-most-played game that is published by The New York Times, behind Wordle. The puzzles are written by editor Wyna Liu.

== Gameplay ==
March 12, 2024

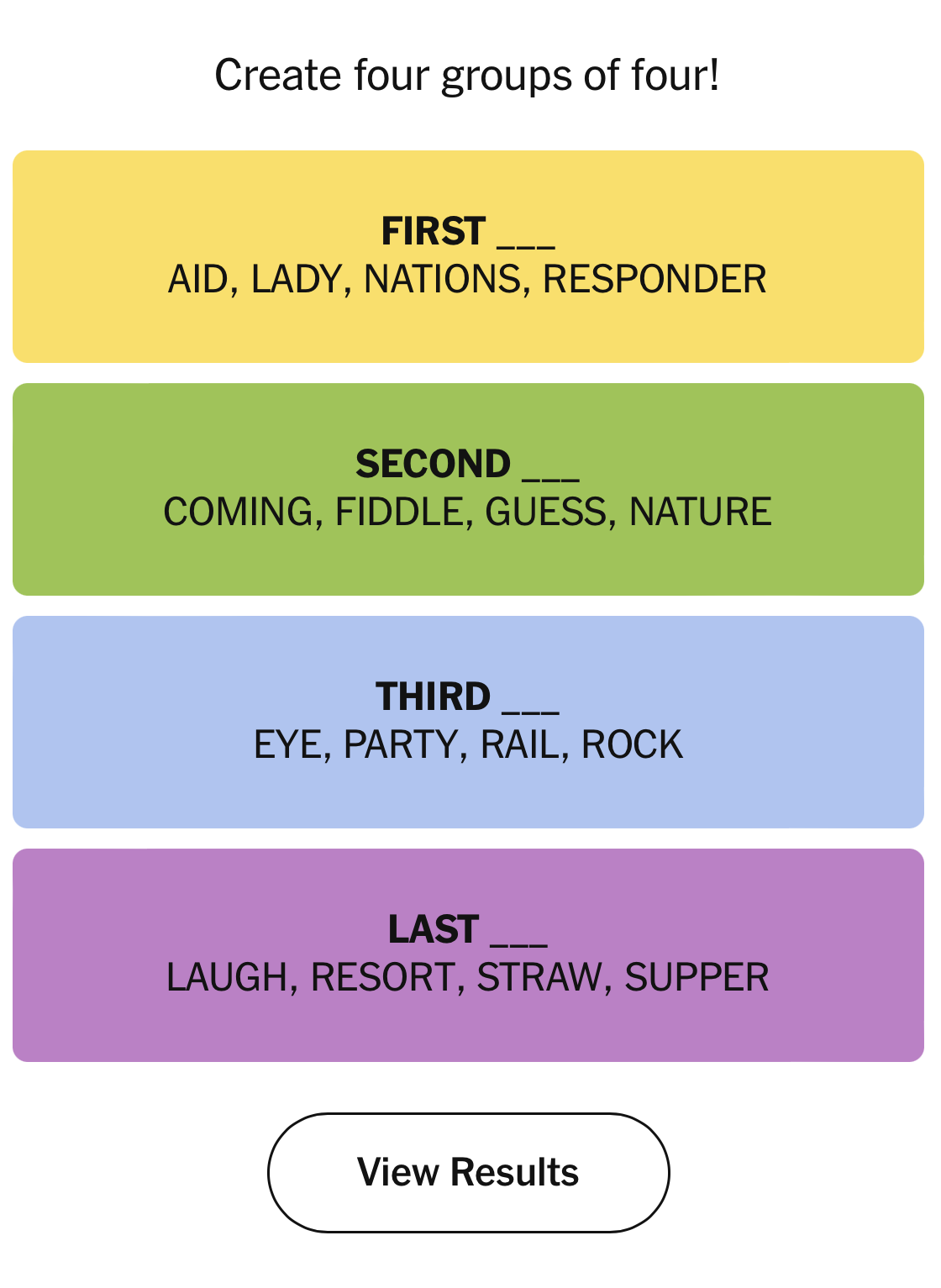
July 31, 2025

A partially completed game (March 12, 2024) and a completed game (July 31, 2025) of Connections. The remaining answers for the partial game are: "Also, And, Plus, With" in green for "Including", and "Daddy, Harlem, Howl, If" in purple for "Famous poems". In the completed game, the theme words also correspond to the game's color/difficulty scale (with yellow said to be the least difficult, and purple the hardest).

In Connections, the goal is to divide a grid of sixteen terms into four groups of four such that the terms in each group belong to a specific category (e.g., "dog", "cat", "fish", and "parrot" for the category "Household Pets"). The categories may involve wordplay such as palindromes or homophones, increasing the difficulty. Red herrings frequently occur, with groups of four which seemingly belong together (such as "north", "south", "east" and "west") but are actually to be sorted into different categories based on different, more subtle connections with other words. When a player successfully identifies a group, its category is revealed along with a color-coded difficulty level: categories are rated yellow, green, blue, or purple, with yellow being the most straightforward and purple being the most difficult. Each Connections game has one category from each difficulty level.

The puzzle on April 1, 2024 (April Fools' Day) used emojis instead of words. For April Fools' Day in 2025, the game consisted of symbols and letters. For April Fool's Day in 2026, the terms were rebus puzzles.

For the 1,000th edition of Connections on March 7, 2026, the puzzle used a symbol of the game's icon for one of the playing tiles.

== Development ==
The games department of The New York Times hosts an annual game jam in which participants suggest ideas for upcoming games to release to the website. Connections had been in development for a year before releasing in its beta phase on June 12, 2023. The puzzles are written by Wyna Liu, who is also a crossword editor at The New York Times. Liu cited cartoonist Robert Leighton as an inspiration for lateral and visual word play.

Several people associated with Only Connect, a British television quiz show, have commented on the similarity between Connections and the Connecting Wall segment of the program.

== Sports edition ==
Connections Sports logo

On September 24, 2024, The Athletic, in partnership with The New York Times Games, launched a sports edition of Connections in beta. The sports edition features the same gameplay as the regular version, with each grouping sports-themed. The game was officially launched on February 9, 2025, to coincide with Super Bowl LIX. Games are written by The Athletic's managing editor for news, Mark Cooper, who became the site's puzzle editor with the launch. Cooper said that unlike the original version, which he called a word game, the sports edition relied more on a trivia component to solve, with Cooper trying to include one category each game that is trivia based. Additionally, Cooper tries to have the purple category feature wordplay like the original. With the game's official launch, an optional timer for completing the puzzle was added.

In September 2025, themed puzzles for all 32 NFL teams were created to coincide with the start of the 2025 NFL season, and were available for the entire month. A separate soccer-themed version was launched in June 2026 to run concurrent with the 2026 FIFA World Cup, being available for the duration of the World Cup. Because of its popularity, it continued as a daily game from July 20, following the conclusion of the World Cup.
