= Brendan Emmett Quigley =

American crossword constructor (born 1974)

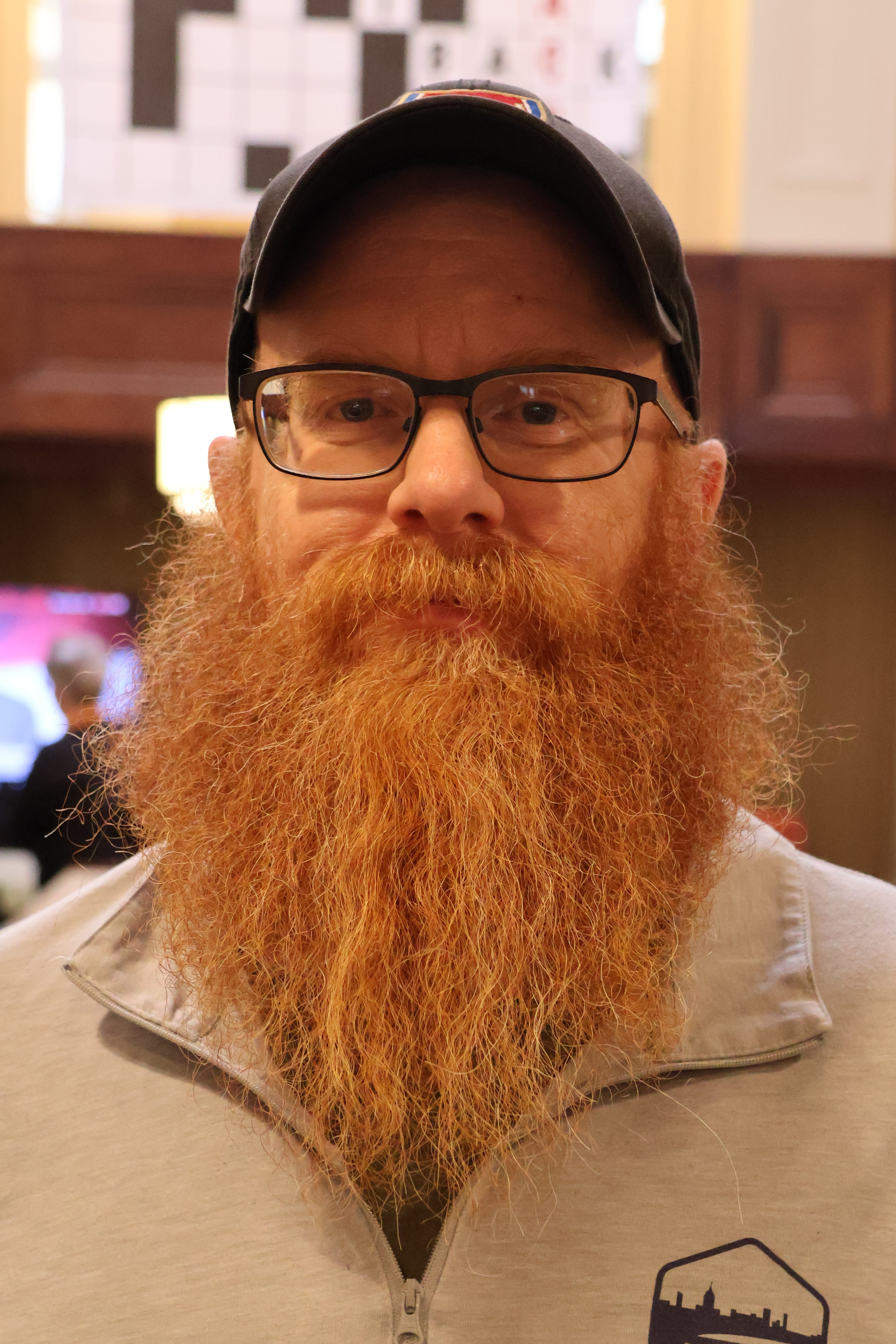
- Quigley in 2024
- Born: 1974 (age 51–52); Norwood, Massachusetts
- Occupation: crossword constructor
- Website: brendanemmettquigley.com

Brendan Emmett Quigley (born 1974) is an American crossword constructor. He has been described as a "crossword wunderkind". His work has been published in The New York Times, The Washington Post, The Wall Street Journal, The Boston Globe, by the Los Angeles Times Syndicate, and The Onion. He appeared in the documentary Wordplay and the book Crossworld: One Man's Journey into America's Crossword Obsession.

In a 2007 interview, The Boston Globe Magazine credited Quigley with "making the New York Times crossword hip."

== Career ==
Quigley was born in Norwood, Massachusetts. He became interested in crosswords while studying at the University of New Hampshire. Will Shortz bought his first submission to The New York Times.

He lists Merl Reagle, Frank Longo, Elizabeth Gorski and Patrick Berry among his influences.

He has constructed puzzles for the American Crossword Puzzle Tournament, the Boston Crossword Puzzle Tournament, and Lollapuzzoola. As a tournament competitor, Brendan finished second in the E Division at the American Crossword Puzzle Tournament in 2001, and second in the Local Division at Lollapuzzoola 5 in 2012.

Quigley is also a musician, playing in such Boston-area bands as The Campaign For Real-Time and Hip Tanaka. He is currently a member of the Boston Typewriter Orchestra.

Quigley maintains a blog, entitled "Crossword Puzzles by Brendan Emmett Quigley."
