= Mike Shenk =

American crossword puzzle editor (born 1958)

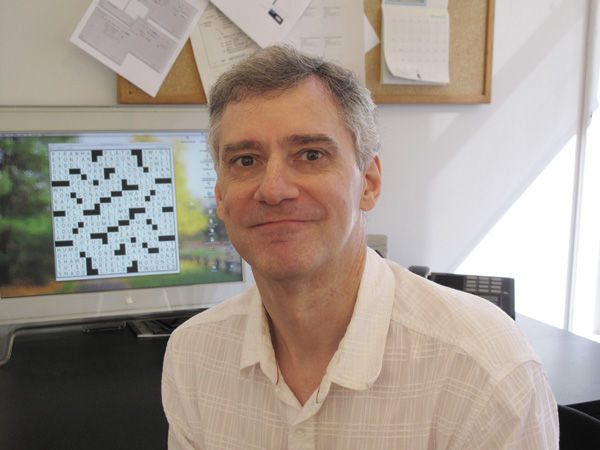
- Shenk c. 2014
- Born: 1958 (age 67–68); Manheim, Pennsylvania, U.S.
- Education: Penn State University (BS)
- Occupations: Puzzle creator; puzzle editor
- Website: www.mikeshenk.com

Mike Shenk (born 1958) is an American crossword puzzle creator and editor. He has been the editor of the Wall Street Journal crossword puzzle since 1998. He is considered one of the foremost crossword constructors of his time.

== Career ==
Shenk grew up as one of four siblings on a family farm in Manheim, Pennsylvania. He solved his mother's Dell crossword books and taught himself to construct puzzles in his youth. After graduating from Manheim Central High School in 1975, he went to Penn State University, where he became the Daily Collegian's first daily crossword constructor, publishing five new puzzles a week for three years. He graduated with a bachelor's degree in mathematics in 1979 and spent a year working as a math teacher at a vocational high school in York, Pennsylvania.

In 1980, Shenk began submitting crosswords to Games magazine, after having the previous year entered a crossword contest curated by Will Shortz for Bantam Books. Shortz, then also an editor at Games, liked his puzzles and recommended him to be hired as an assistant editor in 1981. He worked for Games as a constructor and editor until 1996 except for one year when it was briefly discontinued. He also wrote puzzles for syndication by King Features. After leaving Games, he and former Games editors Amy Goldstein and Robert Leighton founded the puzzle-writing company Puzzability in 1996.

The Wall Street Journal hired Shenk as its first crossword puzzle editor in 1998. The newspaper started with weekly 21×21 puzzles on Fridays and added variety puzzles on Saturdays when the paper's weekend edition launched in 2005. Monday crosswords ran in some editions for a few years before the Journal introduced daily weekday crosswords in September 2015; the 21×21 puzzle moved to the weekend, and Friday crosswords became meta contest puzzles. He formerly credited his own constructions to anagrammatic pseudonyms such as Marie Kelly ("really Mike") and Colin Gale and Alice Long ("Collegian").

Shenk has invented several variety puzzle formats, such as Spell Weaving and Snowflake. He has been a judge and constructor at the American Crossword Puzzle Tournament (ACPT). At ACPT in 2005, he hand-constructed, clued, and printed copies of a new puzzle in an hour, a feat recorded during the making of the documentary Wordplay, and the puzzle ran in the Times two weeks later. He was awarded the Merl Reagle MEmoRiaL Award "for lifetime achievement in crossword construction" at ACPT in 2019.

== Personal life ==
As of 2014, Shenk lives in Manhattan, New York City.
