= Holy Tango of Literature =

2004 anthology

Holy Tango of Literature is a 2004 anthology of absurdist poetry and drama in the style of various poets and playwrights, written by Francis Heaney with illustrations by Richard Thompson. It was published by Emmis Books, after some of its content originally appeared in Modern Humorist in 2000 and 2001. Heaney later released the full work online under the Creative Commons license.

The content is dedicated to anagrams (hence the title: "Holy Tango" is an anagram of "anthology"), with each work's title being an anagram of a noted poet or playwright's name. The content of the work is based on that title, and written to mimic one of the original author's most noted works. For example, Gerard Manley Hopkins is anagrammed into "Kong Ran My Dealership", which parodies Hopkins' The Windhover, and describes how King Kong was hired to manage a car dealership.

== Reception ==
Publishers Weekly considered it "brilliantly funny" and "terribly clever", while in the Spectator, Sam Leith called it a "complete joy". Neil Gaiman found it to be "really sharp", and Douglas Wolk thought it was "awesome".
