= Trip Payne =

American crossword compiler

Norman "Trip" Payne is an American professional puzzle maker. He is known by many as a three-time champion of the American Crossword Puzzle Tournament (ACPT). With his first victory in 1993, at age 24, Payne became the youngest champion ever in the tournament's history, a record he held until 2005.

== Early life and education ==
Payne was born in Rock Hill, South Carolina. He grew up in nearby Spartanburg, attending Spartanburg High School, and has been making puzzles professionally since publication in Games in November 1983. He attended Emory University in Atlanta, graduating with a degree in English in 1990.

== Career ==
Payne interned at Games during his college summer vacations, where one of his pseudonyms was the anagram "Art Pipeny"; he was expected to go on to work there full-time after college, but two days before his graduation, the magazine folded temporarily. In 1990 he also served on the four-person American team that won the International Crossword Marathon.

In 1992, he was awarded CROSSWRD's "Wynner Award" for creating the best unthemed crossword puzzle of the year.

After graduation, he moved to New York City and was editor-in-chief of Herald Tribune Crossword Puzzles Only, Large Print Crosswords, and Crosswords & Other Word Games magazines, 1990–1991. He moved back to Atlanta in 1991 to embark upon a full-time freelance puzzlemaking career. He is a former contributing editor to Games, Games World of Puzzles, and Crossword magazines, and a former proofreader for Creators Syndicate, Dell Champion Crossword Puzzles, and other magazines.

In 1999, Payne was the third contestant to appear on the U.S. version of Who Wants to Be a Millionaire, and was the first to earn $32,000.

In 2002, one of his crosswords was voted Puzzle of the Year by solvers of the New York Times crossword puzzle.

A member of the National Puzzlers' League since 1986, he served as vice president from 1991 to 1992 and hosted the group's annual convention in Atlanta in 1998. He created or co-created vast multi-puzzle team games for the 1991 and 1993 conventions.

In 2006, Payne was one of the crossword solvers profiled in the documentary Wordplay. He also appeared briefly on a number of other television shows, including an episode of Nightline about the American Crossword Puzzle Tournament.

In 2014, he won Lollapuzzoola's At-Home Division, edging out David Plotkin by five points. Mathematically, Plotkin would have finished first had both contestants competed at the live tournament in New York City.

Payne was the "Word Expert" on the CBS game show Million Dollar Password. He authors the wordoku puzzle in TV Guide. He also occasionally writes puzzles for The New York Times, The New York Sun, and The Wall Street Journal, and usually creates one or two puzzle books per year for Sterling Publishing. He has been ranked among the top 50 Scrabble players in North America.

He made five crosswords a week for Yahoo!, Daily Crossword with Hints.

== Publications ==
- 365 Mind-Challenging Cryptograms
- The Little Giant Encyclopedia of Word Puzzles (co-author)
- Crosswords to Strain Your Brain
- Pop Culture Crosswords
- Sit & Solve Scratch Movie Trivia
- Sit & Solve Crosswords (volumes 1–3)
- Crosswords for Kids (volumes 1–8)
- Cosmopolitans & Crosswords
- Tiptop Crisscross Puzzles

Payne has also been published in New York Newsday; the Atlanta Journal-Constitution; the New Yorker; Dell Champion Crossword Puzzles; Creators Syndicate; United Feature Syndicate; the Simon & Schuster crossword puzzle book series; the Expert's Book of Crosswords; Masterpiece Crosswords; Random House Ultrahard Crosswords; and Random House Editor's Choice Crosswords. Small magazines and by-mail crossword clubs for more dedicated solvers include Tough Puzzles, Tough Cryptics, Cryptics Monthly, Uptown Crossword Club, and Crossword Puzzles of the Month Club.

Magazines that have run specially commissioned puzzles from Payne include Golf Magazine, Manhattan File, American Times, Out, and many more; corporate clients have included IBM, NPR, Amtrak, MetLife, Dodge, Fox TV, Hanna-Barbera, Fruit of the Loom, and Kleenex.
