= Maura Jacobson =

American crossword puzzle creator

Maura Jacobson (April 28, 1926 – December 25, 2017) was an American crossword puzzle constructor, who created 1,400 puzzles during 30 years constructing a weekly crossword puzzle for New York magazine and another 66 puzzles for The New York Times.

== Career ==
Jacobson had prior experience with trivia, winning $3,150 on three episodes of the game show Jeopardy!, on shows that aired a few weeks after the show debuted in 1964. She tried her hand at creating crossword puzzles, submitting some samples to Margaret Farrar, the first crossword puzzle editor at The New York Times, who rejected her offerings but offered some constructive suggestions for future improvements. After injuries suffered in a 1971 car accident restricted her activities for a year, she began constructing puzzles while recuperating. Her first puzzle appeared in The Times on January 17, 1954; her 66th and final Times puzzle was printed on September 16, 2009. She started writing puzzles for Cue magazine in 1978 and shifted to New York magazine when that publication acquired Cue in 1980. She worked at New York for more than three decades until her retirement from the publication in 2011, publishing a puzzle that she created on a weekly basis without missing an issue for 30 years; in the year before she retired, she began submitting puzzles in alternating weekly issues with Cathy Allis creating puzzles in the other weeks. Through 2011, she had created a puzzle every year for the American Crossword Puzzle Tournament, since it began in 1978.

== Crossword construction style ==
She listed some of her crossword puzzle construction techniques as starting the puzzle from the top left with simpler clues and answers that invite participation, as well as avoiding two obscure answers crossing each other. She preferred to avoid the unusual words often used by other constructors.

== Personal life ==
Born Maura Bandler in Brooklyn in 1926, she graduated from Hunter College at the age of 19 and became a teacher. She married Dr. Jerome Jacobson in 1948.

== Death ==
Jacobson died at the age of 91 on December 25, 2017, in White Plains, New York.
