= Boston Typewriter Orchestra =

American experimental comedy band

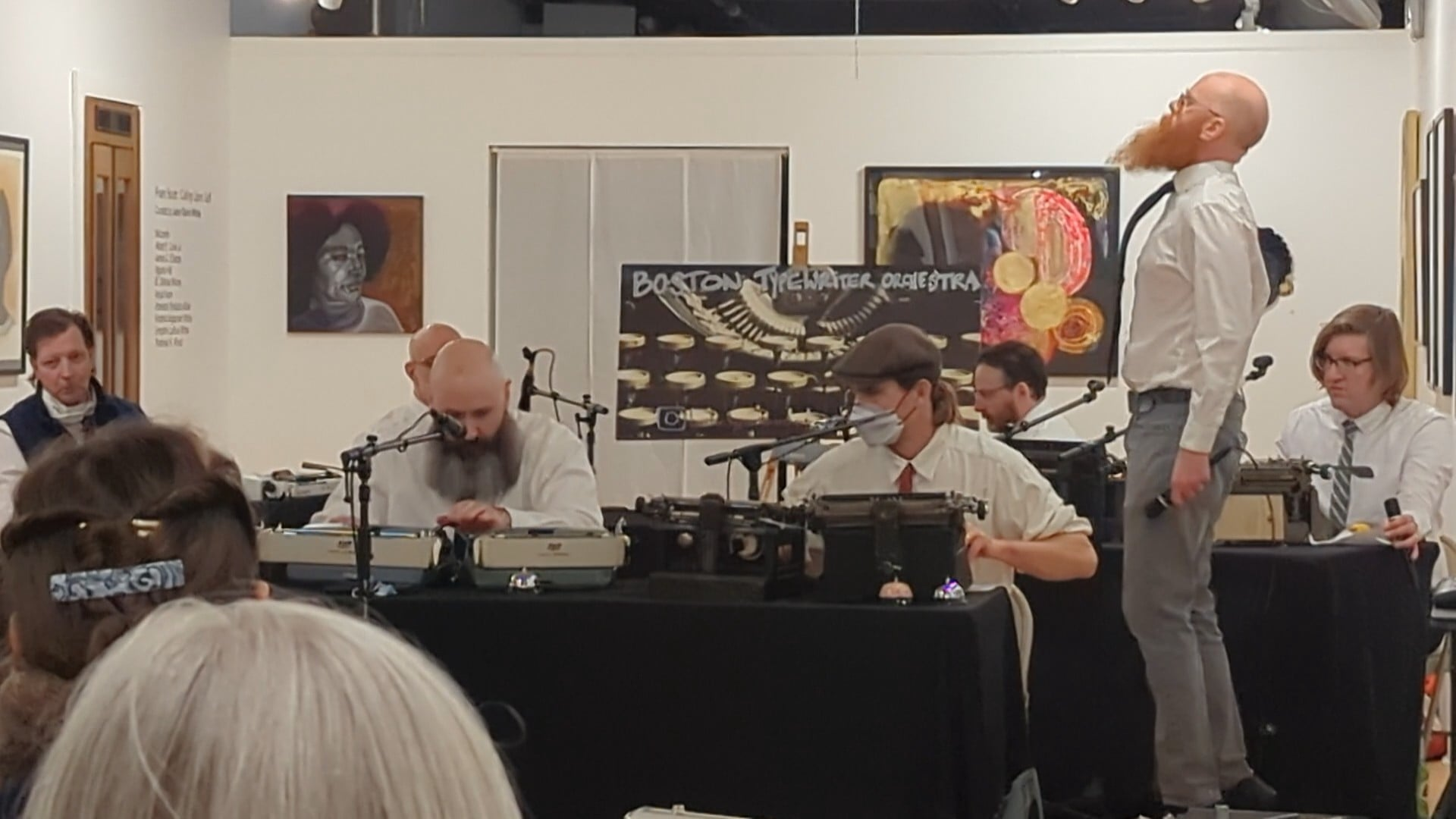
- Boston Typewriter Orchestra in 2022. From left to right: James O'Grady, Steve Mazzulli, Derrik Albertelli, Alex Holman, Chris Keene, Brendan Emmett Quigley, James Brockman

Background information
- Origin: Boston, Massachusetts, US
- Genres: Experimental music; comedy
- Years active: 2004–present
- Members: Derrik Albertelli; James Brockman; Eric Donohue; Alex Holman; Chris Keene; Giordana Mecagni; James O'Grady; Brendan Emmett Quigley
- Past members: Jim Barnes; Jeff Breeze; Tim Devin; James Hodge; Erik Lindahl; Richard Maddalo; Steve Mazzulli; Tom S; Chris Webb
- Website: bostontypewriterorchestra.com

The Boston Typewriter Orchestra (BTO) is an American collective percussion ensemble for typewriter and voice, based in the Boston area. It was founded in 2004.

== Formation ==
One night in 2004, Boston-area artist Tim Devin was presented with the gift of a child's typewriter at a bar. His typing eventually annoyed the waitress who asked him to stop, whereupon he responded "It's OK, ma'am. I'm the conductor of the Boston Typewriter Orchestra." Thinking there was something to the idea, he assembled a group of interested performers on the night of October 20th, 2004 in Somerville, Massachusetts.

An office setting was quickly decided upon as an overarching theme for live performances. The members (usually numbering between four and eight people) perform wearing white shirts and neckties, engage in typical workplace banter and write office-themed lyrics to satirical or comedic effect. The typewriters are utilized in a rhythmic fashion while melodic elements are supplied by the vocalists. The group uses several varieties of manual typewriters from such manufacturers as Underwood, Smith Corona, Hermes, Remington and Royal.

The Boston Typewriter Orchestra began performing at house parties, eventually expanding venues to clubs, arts festivals, and museums. Local and national media appearances soon followed. The group appears in the documentary California Typewriter, and their song "Entropy Begins at the Office" has been used in promotional ads for the film The Post.

== Notable performances and appearances ==
- November 27, 2006 – Paradise Rock Club with Amanda Palmer
- February 4, 2007 – Weekend Today, NBC
- October 9, 2008 – Boston Orchestra Makes Typewriters Sing, NPR
- June, 21 2011 – America's Got Talent, NBC
- January 31, 2015 – Langston Hughes Google Doodle
- September 2, 2016 – California Typewriter (documentary film)
- April 5, 2017 – Playing Against Type, Great Big Story (CNN)
- September 27, 2017 – Outlook, BBC World Service
- December 30, 2017 – The Post (promotional video)
- February 9, 2020 - The Blunderwood Portable
- August 17, 2020 - The Kelly Clarkson Show, NBCUniversal Television Distribution
- July 22, 2022 - WBZ-TV, CBS Boston
- December 7, 2023 - NBC Nightly News,

== Discography ==
Albums

- The Revolution Will Be Typewritten! (2006)
- Overtime at the Piano Factory – Live (2008)
- Termination Without Prejudice, Volume 1 (2017)
- Workstation to Workstation (2020)
- Delegation: The Remixes (2021)

Singles

- The Revolution Will Be Typewritten (2010)
- Entropy Begins at the Office (2013)
- Underwood Blues (2013)
- An Autographed Picture of the Boss' Wife (Demo, 2014)
- At the Staff Meeting (2020)
- State Trooper / Ghost Rider (2025)

Music Videos

- Underwood Blues (2013)
- Mail Guy (2019)
- At the Staff Meeting (2020)
- Left Blank (2023)
- Selectric Funeral (2024)
- Floating Holiday (2024)
- This Could Have Been an Email (2025)

Miscellany

- Beyond Yacht Rock Bumpers (2016)
- Beyond Yacht Rock Bumpers II: Analog Boogaloo (2018)
- Elevator Music 8 (Gallery Aferro exhibition soundtrack, 2022)
