= Parnell Hall (writer) =

American novelist (1944–2020)

- Born: October 31, 1944; Culver City, California, U.S.
- Died: December 15, 2020 (aged 76)
- Occupations: Novelist, short story writer
- Writing career
- Pen name: JP Hailey
- Period: 1980s–2020
- Genres: Crime fiction, mystery fiction
- Website: parnellhall.com

Parnell Hall (October 31, 1944 – December 15, 2020) was an American mystery writer. His works include the Puzzle Lady and the Stanley Hastings series, as well as the screenplay to 1984's C.H.U.D. He collaborated with Manny Nosowsky for crossword puzzles and with Will Shortz for sudoku puzzles incorporated in Puzzle Lady stories.

He also wrote under the pen name J.P. Hailey, under which he wrote the Steve Winslow series. He co-authored "Smooth Operator" with Stuart Woods.

In 2019, Malice Domestic gave him an award for Lifetime Achievement.

Hall died on December 15, 2020, at the age of 76.

== Bibliography ==
=== The Stanley Hastings Mysteries ===
1. Detective (1987)
2. Murder (1988)
3. Favor (1988)
4. Strangler (1989)
5. Client (1990)
6. Juror (1990)
7. Shot (1991)
8. Actor (1993)
9. Blackmail (1994)
10. Movie (1995)
11. Trial (1996)
12. Scam (1997)
13. Suspense (1998)
14. Cozy (2001)
15. Manslaughter (2002)
16. Hitman (2007)
17. Caper (2010)
18. Stakeout (2013)
19. Safari (2014)
20. A Fool for a Client (2015)

=== The Puzzle Lady Mysteries ===
1. A Clue for the Puzzle Lady (1999)
2. Last Puzzle & Testament (2000)
3. Puzzled to Death (2001)
4. A Puzzle in a Pear Tree (2002)
5. With This Puzzle, I Thee Kill (2003)
6. And a Puzzle to Die On (2004)
7. Stalking the Puzzle Lady (2005)
8. You Have the Right to Remain Puzzled (2006)
9. The Sudoku Puzzle Murders (2008)
10. Dead Man’s Puzzle (2009)
11. The Puzzle Lady vs. The Sudoku Lady (2010)
12. The KenKen Killings (2011)
13. $10,000 in Small Unmarked Puzzles (2012)
14. Arsenic and Old Puzzles (2013)
15. NYPD Puzzle (2014)
16. Puzzled Indemnity (2015)
17. Presumed Puzzled (2016)
18. A Puzzle to Be Named Later (2017)
19. The Purloined Puzzle (2018)
20. Lights! Camera! Puzzles! (2019)

=== Teddy Fay novels (with Stuart Woods) ===
All these novels also feature Woods' popular character Stone Barrington.

1. Smooth Operator (2016)
2. The Money Shot (2018)
3. Skin Game (2019)
4. Bombshell (June 2, 2020)

=== Herbie Fisher novels (with Stuart Woods) ===
Also features Stone Barrington.

1. Barely Legal (2017)

=== As J.P. Hailey ===
==== The Steve Winslow Courtroom Dramas ====
1. The Baxter Trust (1988)
2. The Anonymous Client (1989)
3. The Underground Man (1990)
4. The Naked Typist (1990)
5. The Wrong Gun (1992)
6. The Innocent Woman (2011)

==== Thriller ====
1. Chasing Jack (2020)

=== Anthologies and collections ===
Anthology or Collection	Contents	Publication Date	Comments
Crime Square	Times Square Shuffle		Edited by Robert J. Randisi
Crimes by Moonlight: Mysteries from the Dark Side	Death of a Vampire	April 2010	Edited by Charlaine Harris
Dead Man's Hand: Crime Fiction at the Poker Table	Deal Me In		
Murder at the Foul Line	Fear of Failure		
Murder Most Crafty	Oh, What a Tangled Lanyard We Weave		
Show Business is Murder	Line Reading		
Death Dines In	Lethal Luncheon		
Most Wanted	Faking it		An anthology of short stories by past presidents of the Private Eye Writers of America
Murder Most Feline	The Witness Cat		JP Hailey
The Shamus Game	The Missing Heir		
Canine Christmas	Clicker Training		
Dark City Lights: New York Stories			

== Filmography ==
Cannibalistic Humanoid Underground Dwellers (C.H.U.D) – 1984 – screenplay
