= Dan Feyer =

American crossword puzzle solver

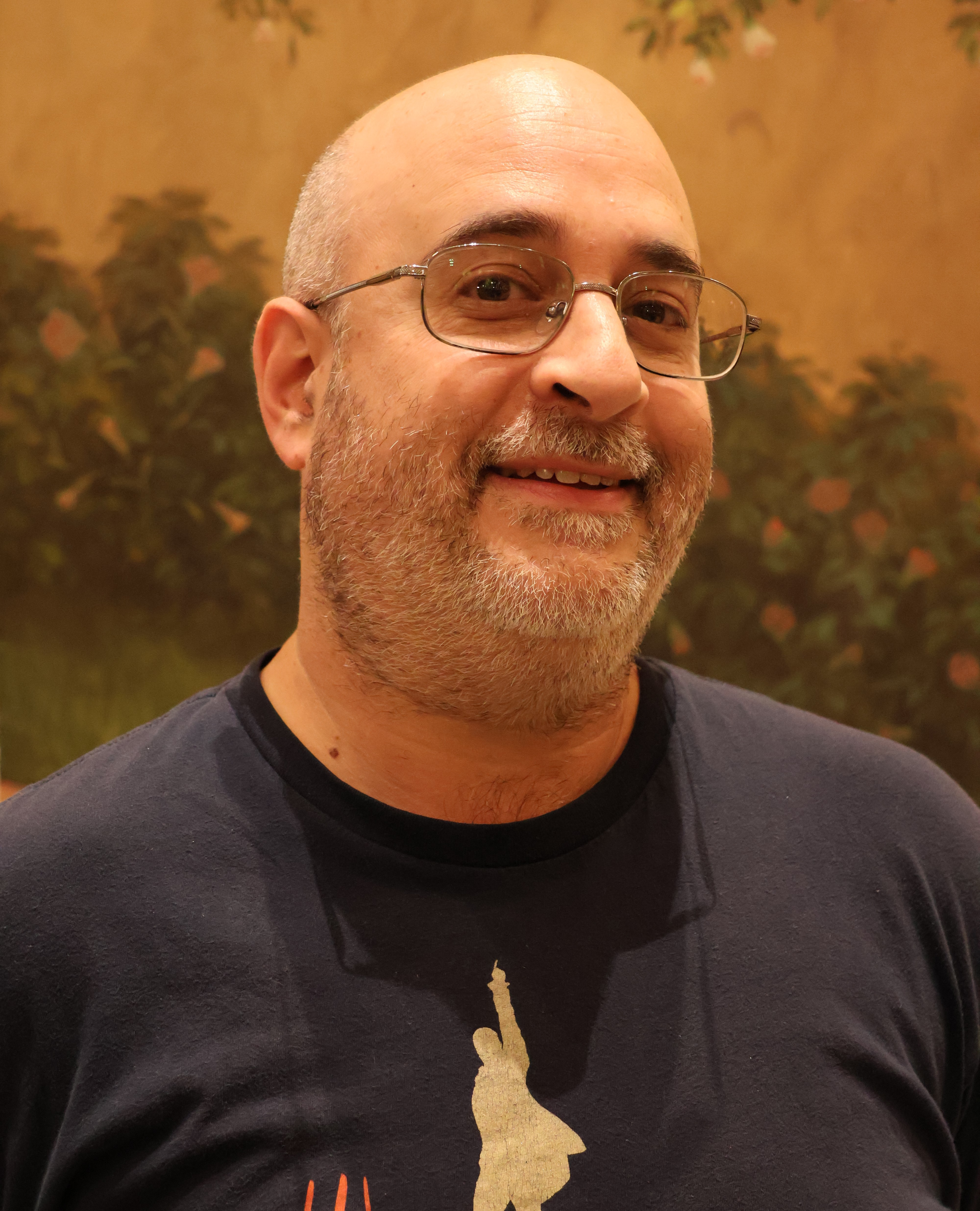
- Feyer at the 2024 American Crossword Puzzle Tournament

Personal information
- Nationality: American

Sport
- Sport: Crosswords

Achievements and titles
- National finals: 2010–2015, 2017, 2019, 2023: American Crossword Puzzle Tournament Champion

Dan Feyer is an American crossword puzzle solver and editor. He holds the record for the most American Crossword Puzzle Tournament (ACPT) championships, with nine wins, and the most consecutive championships, with six. He was described by The New York Times as "the wizard who is fastest of all", solving the Times's Saturday crossword in an average of 4:03 minutes each week and the Sunday crossword in an average of 5:38 minutes.

== Puzzle career ==
Feyer began solving puzzles seriously in 2006, after watching the documentary Wordplay about the ACPT. He first entered the ACPT in 2008, placing 45th. In 2009 he placed 4th. From 2010 until 2015, he placed 1st; in 2016, he placed 2nd to Howard Barkin; in 2017, he placed 1st; in 2018, he placed 2nd to Erik Agard; and, in 2019, he again placed 1st. In 2021, the tournament was held virtually for the first time, and Feyer finished 8th.

In 2009, Feyer won the Express Division of the Lollapuzzoola puzzle tournament, for which he has also constructed.

In 2014, his rivalry with Tyler Hinman was described by Time as "America's most elite crossword puzzle rivalry," with veteran crossword editor Will Shortz describing them as "in a class of their own, the type who can flawlessly tear through a New York Times Sunday crossword in under four minutes."
