= Lynn Lempel =

American crossword constructor (born 1946)

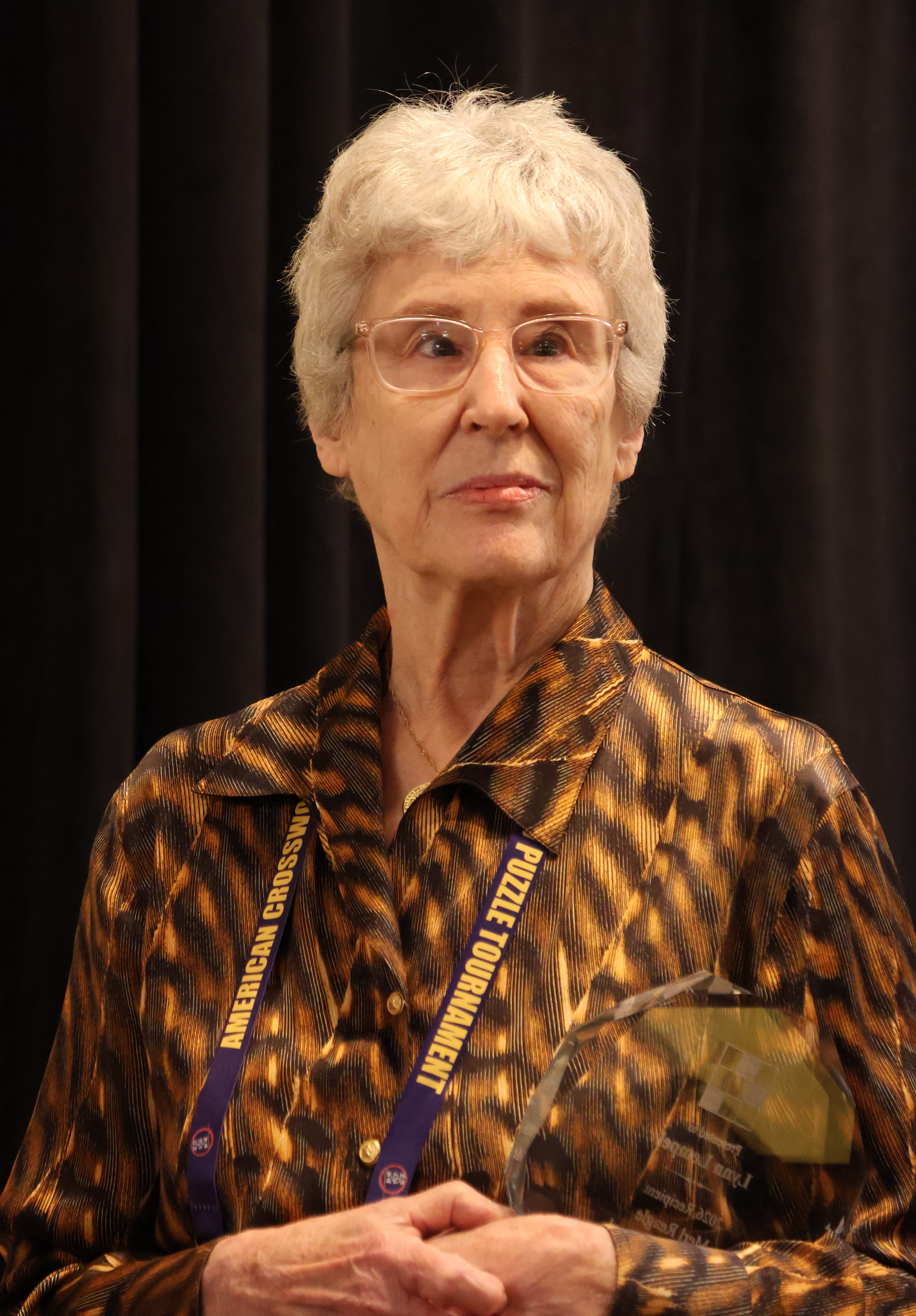
- Lempel in 2026
- Born: December 27, 1946 (age 79)
- Education: Syracuse University (PhD)
- Occupation: Crossword constructor
- Known for: The New York Times crossword puzzles (1979–present)

Lynn Gilbert Lempel (born December 27, 1946) is an American crossword puzzle constructor. She has created crosswords for many publications, including more than 100 puzzles for The New York Times since 1979.

== Crossword career ==
Lempel began constructing crosswords in the 1970s, creating them for the weekly newspaper News for You published by Laubach Literacy, the adult literacy organization where she worked. She decided to start because she thought the previous puzzles were too obscure for the newspaper's audience, and she continued making them every week decades after leaving the job. One of her co-workers encouraged her to submit a puzzle to The New York Times. Her first effort was rejected by editor Eugene T. Maleska, but her second was accepted and published on Sunday, December 9, 1979.

Under editor Will Shortz, Lempel came to specialize in the Monday crossword for The New York Times – the easiest puzzle of the week to solve but not necessarily create – and gained the nickname "Queen of Mondays" (sharing the moniker with Andrea Carla Michaels). She has also had puzzles published by the Los Angeles Times, Games magazine, The New York Sun, The New Yorker, USA Today, The Washington Post, the CrosSynergy Syndicate, Crosswords with Friends, and various crossword books. In 2019, Sterling Publishers published a book of her CrosSynergy puzzles as the collection Easy as Falling Off a Log Crosswords. In 2023, she had her milestone 100th crossword published in the New York Times.

In 2026, Lempel was presented the Merl Reagle MEmoRiaL Award at the American Crossword Puzzle Tournament for "lifetime achievement in crossword construction".

== Personal life ==
Lempel grew up loving puzzles, including Dell crosswords and math puzzles, and had a pun-loving grandfather who always solved the Sunday New York Times crossword. She earned her PhD in adult education from Syracuse University. In 1980, she and her husband, Leonard, moved to Daytona Beach, Florida, where she taught reading and composition at Daytona Beach Community College for ten years, before leaving the job to write puzzles full time. She has also been active with the League of Women Voters and Friends of the Library and been involved in political campaigns.
