= Aimee Lucido =

American writer (born 1990)

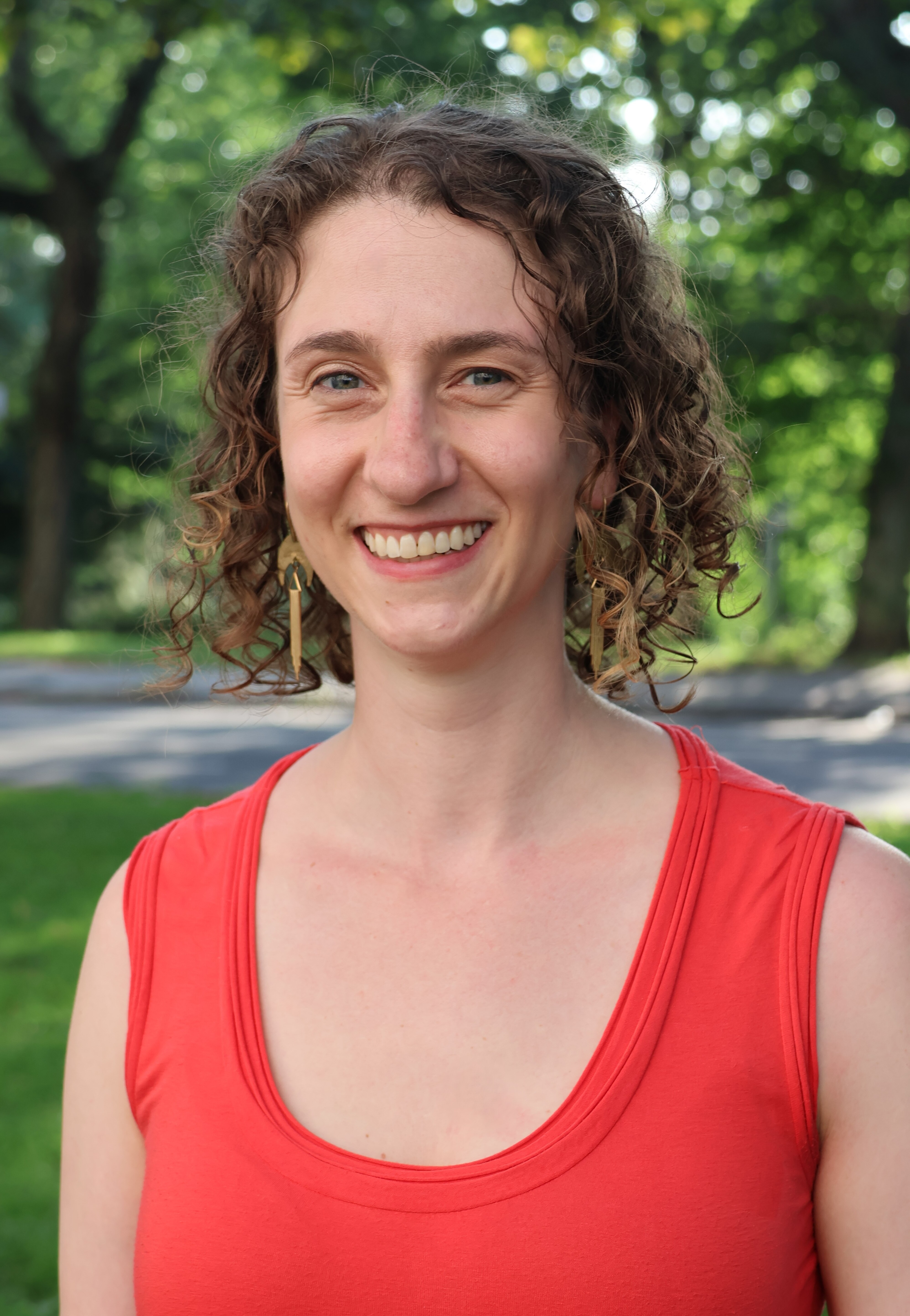
- Lucido in 2024
- Born: October 30, 1990 (age 35)
- Education: Brown University (BAS); Hamline University (MFA)
- Occupations: Author; crossword constructor
- Website: aimeelucido.com

Aimee Lucido (born October 30, 1990) is an American children's author and crossword puzzle constructor. Her books include Emmy in the Key of Code (2019) and Recipe for Disaster (2021).

== Early life and education ==
Lucido studied computer science at Brown University and became a software engineer for Facebook and Uber. While working at Uber, she completed a master's degree at Hamline University in literature for children and young adults. In 2019, she left the company to pursue writing full-time.

== Career ==
=== Crosswords ===
Lucido began writing crosswords during college when a group of Brown students wrote all the puzzles for one week in The New York Times. Her debut kicked off the series on Monday, September 13, 2010. Since then, she has had more than 15 more puzzles published in the Times as of 2024. She has also constructed puzzles for The New Yorker, Scientific American, and the independent outlet AVCX.

=== Writing ===
Lucido's first book, Emmy in the Key of Code, was published by HarperCollins in 2019. It is a story in verse about a girl at a new school who learns the programming language Java and rediscovers her love of music. Her second book, Recipe for Disaster, followed in 2021, telling the story of a girl, Hannah, who studies to have a bat mitzvah against her parents' wishes. Lucido's picture book Pasta Pasta Lotsa Pasta, about a busy family dinner, and her novel Lucky Penny, about a girl on the day of Rosh Hashanah, were published in 2024.

== Bibliography ==
- Lucido, Aimee (September 24, 2019). Emmy in the Key of Code. Illustrated by Abigail Dela Cruz. HarperCollins. ISBN 978-0358040828.
- Lucido, Aimee (September 14, 2021). Recipe for Disaster. HarperCollins. ISBN 978-0358386919.
- Lucido, Aimee (July 2, 2024). Pasta Pasta Lotsa Pasta. Illustrated by Mavisu Demirağ. Beach Lane Books. ISBN 978-1534473638.
- Lucido, Aimee (September 10, 2024). Lucky Penny. Illustrated by Jon Davis. Apples & Honey Press. ISBN 978-1681156484.
