= Robert Leighton (cartoonist) =

American cartoonist

- Born: May 23, 1960 (age 66)
- Education: Northwestern University
- Occupations: Cartoonist, puzzle writer, illustrator, humorist
- Spouse: Valerie Green
- Children: Kyle Leighton
- Website: www.robert-leighton.com

Robert Leighton is an American cartoonist, writer, artist, puzzle writer, illustrator, and humorist. He lives and works in New York City. His cartoons have appeared regularly in The New Yorker and other periodicals. In 1996, with Mike Shenk and Amy Goldstein, Leighton co-founded Puzzability, a puzzle-writing company. As part of Puzzability, Leighton has coauthored many books of puzzles, as well as puzzle-oriented Op-Ed pieces for The New York Times.

Asked why he creates cartoons and puzzles, two apparently different kinds of work, Leighton replied: "I think a puzzle is like a cartoon, like a joke, because the puzzle is the setup and the solution is the punch line. A good puzzle keeps you in suspense while you’re working on it, like a cartoon. And the ‘aha!’ is the equivalent of the laugh when a joke is resolved.”

== Cartooning ==
Since 2002, Leighton has been a regular contributor of single-panel cartoons to The New Yorker. He has also created comic strips and humorous illustrated puzzles. In 2006, with his partners at Puzzability, Leighton wrote The New Yorker Book of Cartoon Puzzles and Games, which used approximately 700 New Yorker cartoons and their captions as the basis for a variety of puzzle types.

Work that Leighton both wrote and drew has also appeared in the Wall Street Journal, Games, Nickelodeon Magazine, Slate, and SpongeBob Comics.

While he was at Northwestern University, Leighton wrote and drew a comic strip called "Banderooge". He also cofounded and edited the college humor magazine Rubber Teeth.

== Puzzle writing ==
After Leighton graduated from college, he was interested in the possibility of finding employment as both a humor writer and illustrator, and so he went to work as an editor for Games magazine, which hired him on the basis of his humor writing; at that time he had no experience writing puzzles. After leaving Games, he and Mike Shenk and Amy Goldstein, who also had both worked at Games, went on to form a puzzle company called Puzzability. As one of the three principals of Puzzability, Leighton has co-authored a number of puzzle books ranging from crosswords to puzzles for children:

- 2005, Celebrity Crosswords, by Puzzability
- 2006, The Brainiest Insaniest Ultimate Puzzle Book!, by Amy Goldstein, Robert Leighton and Mike Shenk
- 2006, The New Yorker Book of Cartoon Puzzles and Games by Puzzability The book won the Parents Choice Gold Award, 2010.
- 2010, Bananagrams! For Kids, by Puzzability
- 2019, Puzzlelopedia by Robert Leighton with Amy Goldstein and Mike Shenk. Illustrated by Robert Leighton.

=== Puzzle-based Alternate Reality Game ===
In May 2014, Puzzability was hired by Campbell Ewald advertising agency to create an ARG (Alternate Reality Game) for the U.S. Navy’s cryptology division. The resulting puzzle-based game, Project Architeuthis, won 11 advertising awards and resulted in a sequel, Operation Sleeper Shark. Both games played out in real time on Facebook.

== Humor writing ==
Leighton's first published work appeared in Bananas magazine. This was edited by R. L. Stine, who went on to create the Goosebumps series of children's books. While at Northwestern University, Leighton cofounded and edited the college humor magazine "Rubber Teeth."

Leighton was a contributor of cartoons, puzzles, and other humorous articles to Nickelodeon Magazine for its entire run (1993–2009) as well as a contributing writer and editor at National Lampoon magazine in the early 90s.

=== Comedy writing ===
Leighton did some TV comedy writing, including a CBS sitcom which was cancelled before his episode aired. He also wrote individual episodes for live action and animated cable shows including Bear in the Big Blue House, Cartoon Network's Ed, Edd n Eddy and Nickelodeon's The Off-Beats with creator Mo Willems.

== Illustrating ==
Leighton has illustrated a number of books, including What's Going on Down There?, a book about puberty, and Poop Happened! A History of the World From the Bottom Up, a book about human sanitation throughout history.
