= Patrick Berry =

American puzzle creator (born 1970)

- Born: 1970 (age 54–55)
- Occupations: Puzzle creator; puzzle editor; author
- Years active: 1993–present
- Website: aframegames.com

Patrick D. Berry (born 1970) is an American puzzle creator and editor who constructs crossword puzzles and variety puzzles. He had 227 crosswords published in The New York Times from 1999 to 2018. His how-to guide for crossword construction was first published as a For Dummies book in 2004. One of the most revered constructors of his time, Berry has been called the "Thomas Pynchon of crosswords".

== Career ==
Berry grew up in Boca Raton, Florida, and often solved Dell Magazines variety puzzles and tried to write his own crosswords in his youth. He discovered cryptic crosswords in 1992 and had his first cryptic constructing effort accepted by Games magazine. His first published variety puzzle appeared in Games's April 1993 issue.

Berry continued writing puzzles for outlets such as The New Yorker, Harper's Magazine, and the American Crossword Federation's Tough Cryptics newsletter. He invented several variety puzzle formats, such as Rows Garden, Some Assembly Required, Boxing Rings, and Snake Charmer. After the publishing house he worked for shut down in late 1997, he became a full-time "freelance puzzler" ("a very dubious career choice"). He began constructing and editing American-style crosswords for Games World of Crosswords, a sister publication of Games, on a freelance basis. His first New York Times crossword was published on Friday, September 17, 1999.

Wiley, the publisher of the For Dummies book series, approached Berry around 2003 to write a book of crossword puzzles; Berry wanted the book to include a how-to guide on crossword construction, an idea that Wiley approved. Crossword Puzzle Challenges for Dummies, marketed more as a puzzle book than as a resource for aspiring constructors, was published in March 2004. After it had gone out of print, Berry reacquired the rights, updated it, and republished it as a PDF ebook, the Crossword Constructor's Handbook, in 2015.

Most of Berry's 227 crosswords for the Times—published from 1999 to 2018—were themelesses or Sundays. He constructed a six-puzzle meta suite (a series of related puzzles) for the week of October 17, 2011, at the request of editor Will Shortz. He has regularly written variety puzzles for The Wall Street Journal and formerly edited the Chronicle of Higher Education crossword. He began writing weekly novelty word puzzles for the New York Times variety page in 2015 and has been on The New Yorker's puzzle roster since 2018. Puzzle suites are occasionally released on his website, A-Frame Games.

Berry was awarded the Merl Reagle MEmoRiaL Award "for lifetime achievement in crossword construction" at the American Crossword Puzzle Tournament in 2021.

== Personal life ==
As of 2018, Berry lives in an A-frame house in Athens, Georgia.
