= Andrea Carla Michaels =

American crossword constructor

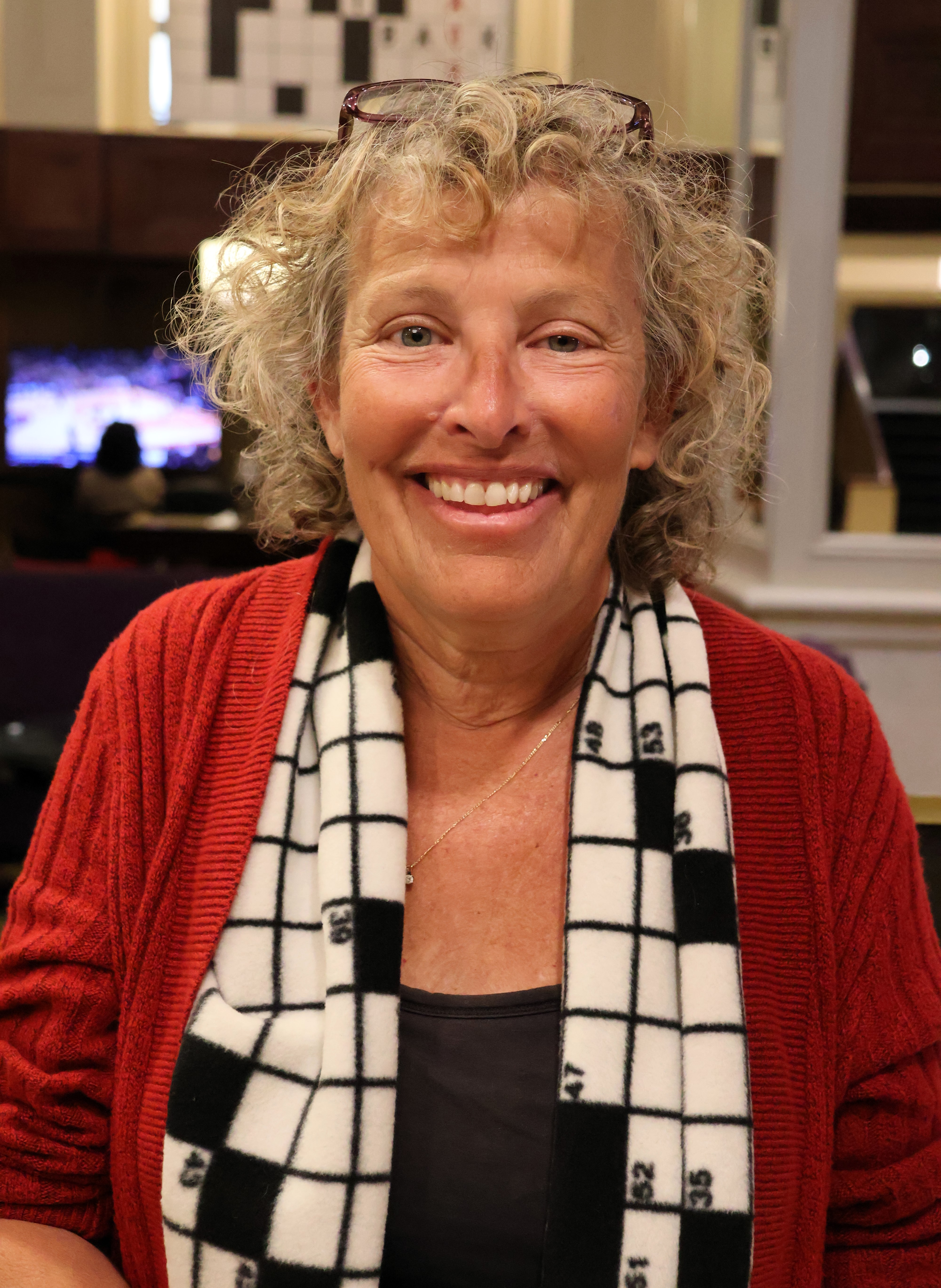
- Michaels at the 2024 American Crossword Puzzle Tournament
- Born: Andrea Carla Eisenberg
- Other names: "ACME"; "Pizza Lady"
- Education: Harvard University
- Occupations: Comedian; writer; crossword constructor; naming consultant
- Known for: The New York Times crossword puzzles (2000–present)
- Website: andrea-carlamichaels.squarespace.com

Andrea Carla Michaels (née Eisenberg) is an American crossword puzzle constructor and corporate naming consultant. She worked as a comedian and television writer after graduating from Harvard University in 1980, has played competitive chess and Scrabble, and appeared on Jeopardy! and Wheel of Fortune. More than 85 crosswords by her have been published in The New York Times since 2000. In San Francisco, she has become known as the "Pizza Lady" for her efforts to feed homeless people in her community.

== Early life and education ==
Andrea Carla Michaels grew up in Minneapolis, Minnesota, the youngest of three daughters of Carol (née Kossin) and M. Michael Eisenberg, a surgeon at the University of Minnesota. She liked solving jigsaw puzzles, playing board games, and helping her father with the Sunday New York Times crossword as a child. She learned chess at age five and played competitively from ages 11 to 15, winning five straight Minnesota women's championships and three national junior titles.

After skipping a grade and a half, Michaels graduated from Northrop Collegiate School in Minneapolis (later the Blake School) in 1976. She graduated from Harvard University with a degree in psychology at age 20 in 1980.

== Career ==
In the 1980s, Michaels moved to Los Angeles and began working in comedy — performing in clubs, writing humor articles for periodicals, and appearing on TV comedy specials. She was named one of the five funniest young comedians in America by the Showtime network in 1984. In Los Angeles, she adopted the stage surname "Michaels", adapted from her father's name. She worked in television as a writer for game shows such as Wordplay and The Challengers, a chaperone on The Dating Game, and a writer for the sitcom Designing Women. She also competed on game shows such as Jeopardy! in 1988 (where she came second to the then-record single-day prize winner) and Wheel of Fortune in 1991 (where she won a motorhome). She joined a Scrabble club, and became a nationally ranked tournament player and instructor.

Michaels moved to San Francisco in 1984. After having previously freelanced as a namer for other firms, she founded a company, Acme Naming, which invents names for companies and products. Not only is the name a reference to the ubiquitous company seen in Looney Tunes, but it also represents her initials (including an “E” for Eisenberg). In 2012, she wrote an essay about childlessness for Henriette Mantel's collection No Kidding: Women Writers on Bypassing Parenthood (2013).

Michaels's puzzle-writing career began in the 1980s with word games and trivia for Games magazine and crosswords for TV Guide. Her first New York Times crossword was published on June 12, 2000, featuring an earthquake theme and "jagged" grid design. New York Times crossword editor Will Shortz said that "it was the first time we'd ever done" that kind of visual innovation, adding, "It was literally and figuratively a groundbreaking crossword." She co-constructed one puzzle with college friend Neil deGrasse Tyson in 2017. As of December 2024, she has had 87 crosswords published in the Times, including 56 collaborations and 63 published on Mondays (the easiest puzzle of the week to solve but not necessarily create), earning the nickname the "Queen of Mondays" (a distinction she shares with Lynn Lempel). Shortz said of Michaels, "Andrea has earned the title 'Queen of Mondays' for her playful, entertaining themes and expertly filled grids composed of lively, familiar vocabulary. Just what Monday puzzles should be."

Michaels has also constructed or co-constructed over 60 puzzles in other publications, including The New Yorker, The Los Angeles Times, and The Wall Street Journal. She was awarded the Merl Reagle MEmoRiaL Award for "lifetime achievement in crossword construction" at the 2024 American Crossword Puzzle Tournament.

== “Pizza Lady” ==
On Christmas Eve 2015, Michaels began serving the homeless community in her neighborhood in San Francisco by handing out pizza and occasionally other donated items, becoming known as the "Pizza Lady". She asked Nobhill Pizza & Shawarma in Nob Hill to set aside leftover slices instead of composting them, and then reheat them for her to give away on Polk Street, where she distributed around twenty slices daily. After the pizzeria began only making pizzas to order during the COVID-19 pandemic in 2020, she handed out food from Golden Veggie Market with "faux sell-by dates" as well as donated clothing. As of 2023, she has continued to deliver leftover pizza from Nobhill Pizza, and she started a website in her effort to identify and return stolen luggage discarded in the area. On October 17, 2023, the San Francisco Board of Supervisors presented a certificate of honor in recognition of her service as Pizza Lady, her efforts to return stolen items, and her work in support of rent control. She has continued to rescue and redistribute food from local shops and restaurants as well as other discarded items that would otherwise end up in landfills.
