= Stanley Newman (crossword editor) =

American puzzle creator (born 1952)

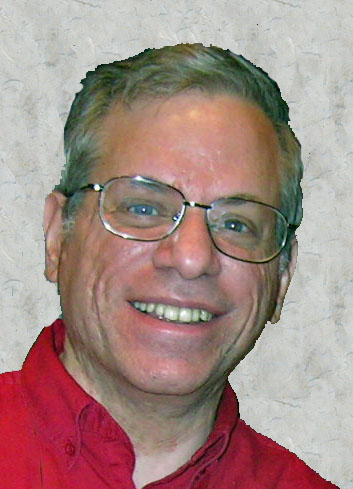
Newman in 2007

Stanley Newman (born July 19, 1952) is an American puzzle creator, editor, and publisher. Newman has been the editor of the Newsday Sunday crossword puzzle since 1988 and the editor of the Newsday daily crossword puzzle since 1992. He is also a trivia buff and the co-author of a trivia encyclopedia, 15,003 Answers.

Newman is a native of Brooklyn, New York, and is a Phi Beta Kappa graduate of Brooklyn College, where he majored in mathematics. He went on to earn a master's degree in statistics from Rutgers University.

Newman's puzzle career started after he won the inaugural U.S. Open Crossword Championship in 1982. He also won the American Crossword Puzzle Tournament that year. Newman founded the American Crossword Federation and started a crossword newsletter in 1983 and began creating his own crosswords soon thereafter.

In 1990, Newman appeared as a contestant on The Challengers television game show and was its biggest winner, finishing with a grand total of $112,480. Over half of that came from his win in the series' Invitational Tournament of Champions, along with a $31,000 Ultimate Challenge win (Unfortunately for Newman, his final day ended with him in negative territory, and thus he was unable to compete in the Final Challenge). He currently is a regular contestant at the Allentown, Pennsylvania Trivia Bowl, held twice annually.

Newman lives in Massapequa Park, New York with his wife and has three grown children.
