= Erik Agard =

American cruciverbalist (born 1993)

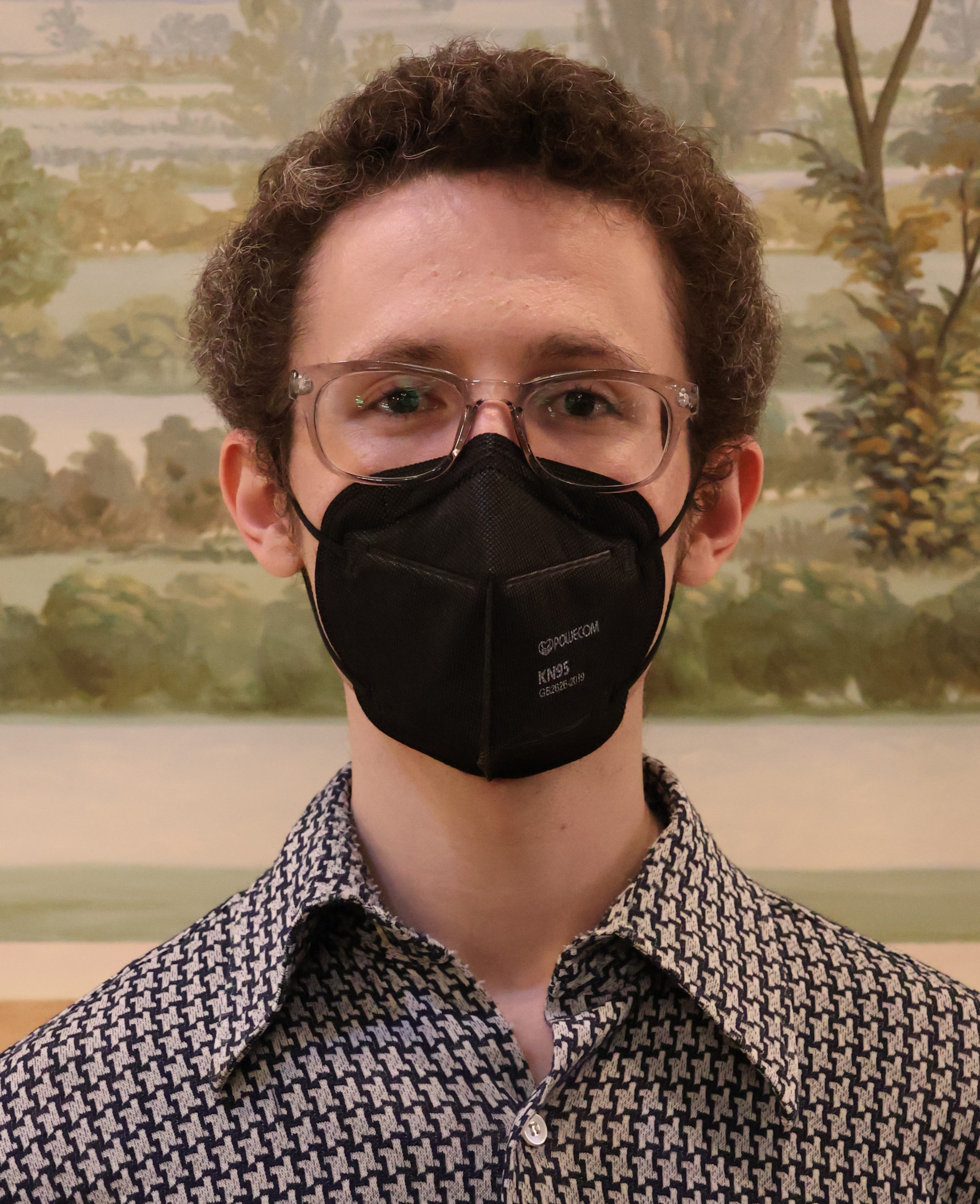
- Agard in 2026

Personal information
- Nationality: United States
- Born: 1993 (age 32–33)
- Education: University of Maryland

Achievements and titles
- National finals: American Crossword Puzzle Tournament champion: 2018, 2026

Erik Agard (born 1993) is an American crossword puzzle constructor, editor, and solver. He is the winner of the 2016 Lollapuzzoola Express Division, the 2018 and 2026 American Crossword Puzzle Tournament (ACPT), a frequent contributor to the New York Times crossword puzzle, a crossword constructor for The New Yorker, a former USA Today crossword editor, and a former Jeopardy! contestant. He is currently a crossword editor at Apple News+.

In 2013, The Washington Post called Agard "the nation's top teen crossword puzzle solver". He has been celebrated for helping to increase diversity and inclusion in crosswords: the puzzles he edited at USA Today were primarily constructed by women and people of color and contain references to media and culture that other mainstream outlets do not consider "standard knowledge". For instance, the February 19, 2022 crossword puzzle contained the clue ["you're telling me a cis ___ built this chapel?" (@RileyJohnSavage tweet)] for the entry TEEN.

During his appearance on Jeopardy!, his use of a meme in answer to a question gained widespread notice. After beating five-time champion Alan Dunn, he won $66,802 in four appearances.

In 2018, Agard was featured on a Real Sports with Bryant Gumbel segment about crossword puzzles.
