= Tyler Hinman =

American crossword solver (born 1984)

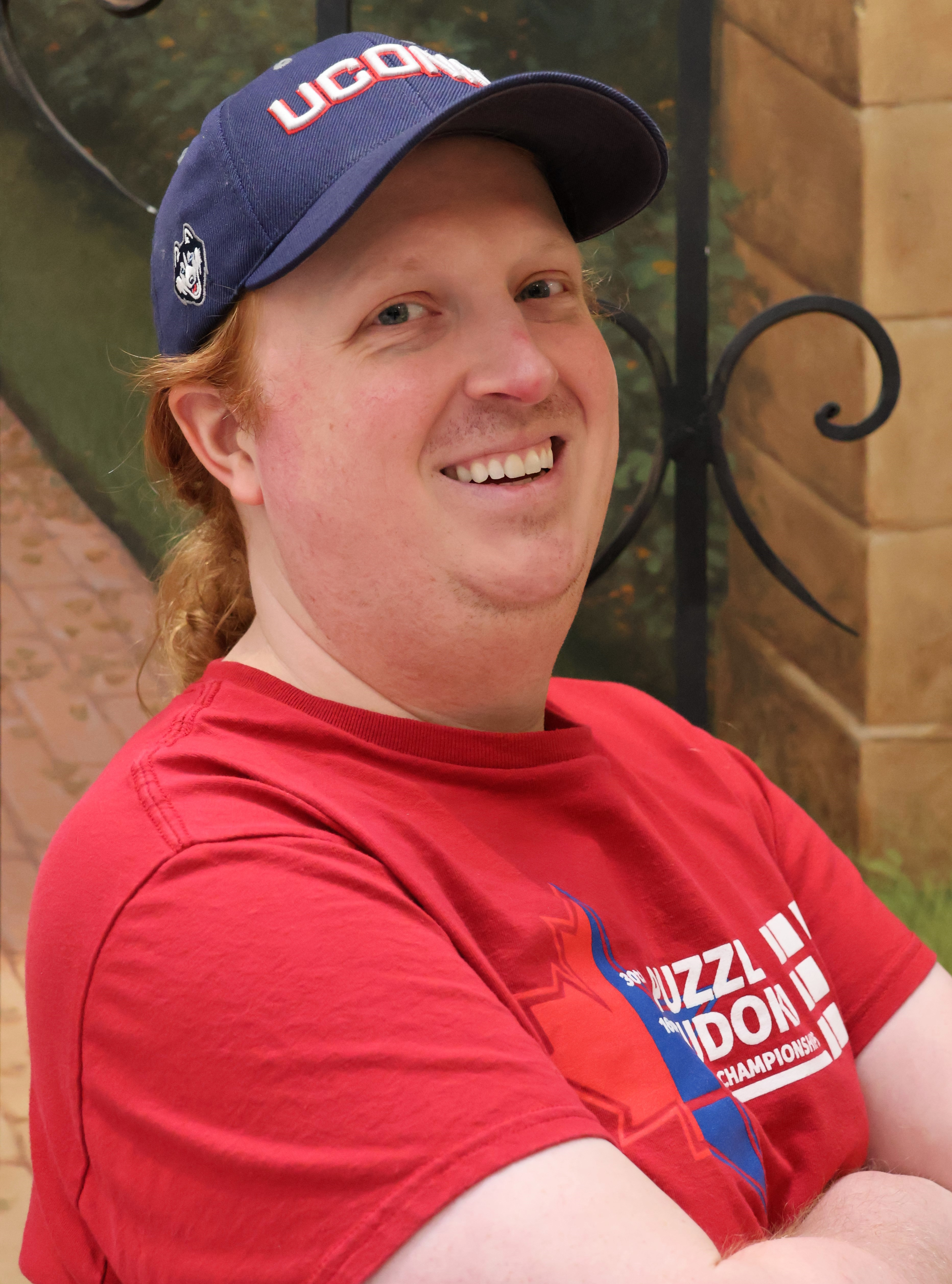
- Hinman at the 2024 American Crossword Puzzle Tournament

Personal information
- Nationality: United States
- Born: November 5, 1984 (age 41) Hartford, Connecticut, U.S.
- Home town: San Francisco, California, U.S.

Sport
- Sport: Crosswords

Achievements and titles
- National finals: American Crossword Puzzle Tournament 2005–2009, 2021–2022: A-Division Champion; 2005–2009, 2021: Regional Division Champion; 2005–2009: Juniors Division Champion 2003: B-Division Champion

Tyler Hinman (born November 5, 1984) is an American competitive crossword puzzle solver and constructor and a seven-time winner of the American Crossword Puzzle Tournament (ACPT). He holds the tournament record for youngest champion ever, winning as a 20-year-old in 2005, and he formerly held the record for consecutive titles with five, a feat matched and bested by six-time champion Dan Feyer. He was one of the featured players in the award-winning 2006 documentary film Wordplay.

== Early life ==
Hinman was born in Hartford, Connecticut, and raised in Connecticut and in England. While a 9th-grade student at The American School in England (TASIS), Hinman was introduced to The New York Times crossword puzzle and became immediately interested. He first entered the ACPT as a 16-year-old in 2001, finishing 101st out of the 322 entered contestants.

== Education and career ==
After graduating from TASIS The American School in England in 2002, Hinman returned to the United States to attend Rensselaer Polytechnic Institute (RPI) where he earned a bachelor's degree in Information Technology in 2006 and joined the Phi Mu Delta fraternity. After graduating, he accepted a job in Chicago, Illinois as a bond trader at Darwin Capital Trading through a connection from the producer of the film Wordplay. After a little more than a year, Hinman left the industry, and he moved to San Francisco in 2008 to work in software development.

== Puzzle career ==
Hinman first entered the ACPT as a sixteen-year-old in 2001, finishing 101st in a field of 322 competitors. He continued to enter each year, capturing the tournament title for the first time in 2005 as a 20-year-old, making him the youngest-ever winner of the tournament. He won the next four tournaments even as they were growing in both size and competitiveness. In 2009, there were nearly 700 competitors, and with his fifth win Hinman had solved forty consecutive tournament puzzles without making a single error. His winning streak came to an end in 2010 when he finished fourth overall in the tournament. For the years 2011–2015, he finished second four times. He won his sixth title in the online-only tournament in 2021, and his seventh ACPT in person in April 2022.

Hinman is also a crossword puzzle constructor, creating original puzzles for publications including The New York Times and The Onion. He was also a contributor to the CrosSynergy Syndicate, and to the American Values Club Xword, edited by Ben Tausig. Hinman, along with fellow puzzlemaker Jeremy Horwitz, received national attention when they fulfilled a wish of San Francisco Giants pitcher Brian Wilson by including his name in a puzzle for the Times. The theme consisted of World Series–winning pitchers who share a name with vocalists on No. 1 hits.

In 2017, Hinman appeared in the FOX game show Superhuman and competed in a race against time to complete five word puzzles.

== Book ==
Hinman has published one book of crossword puzzles.

- Winner's Circle Crosswords: Puzzles from a Five-Time Champion. Sterling Publishing Company. 2013. ISBN 9781402788208.
