= Wordplay (film) =

2006 documentary about the New York Times crossword

- Promotional film poster
- Directed by: Patrick Creadon
- Written by: Patrick Creadon; Christine O'Malley
- Produced by: Christine O'Malley; Michael Creadon; Patrick Walsh
- Edited by: Doug Blush
- Music by: Peter Golub
- Distributed by: IFC Films
- Release date: 2006
- Country: United States
- Budget: $100,000
- Box office: $3.1 million

Wordplay is a 2006 documentary film directed by Patrick Creadon. It features Will Shortz, the editor of the New York Times crossword puzzle, crossword constructor Merl Reagle, and many other noted crossword solvers and constructors. The second half of the movie is set at the 2005 American Crossword Puzzle Tournament (ACPT), where the top solvers compete for a prize of $4000. Wordplay was the best reviewed documentary film of 2006, according to Rotten Tomatoes.

Wordplay was acquired for distribution for $1,000,000 by IFC Films and The Weinstein Company after being nominated for the Grand Jury Prize at Sundance 2006. It was released theatrically on June 16, 2006. The film ran in over 500 theaters across the United States, including at least one theater in all fifty states. Wordplay went on to gross $3,100,000 in domestic box-office, then ranking it among the Top 25 highest grossing documentaries of all time.

A 2008 episode of The Simpsons, "Homer and Lisa Exchange Cross Words", is based on the film. James L. Brooks got the inspiration for the episode after watching Wordplay. "We felt both Will and Merl were very compelling, off-the-beaten-track personalities [in Wordplay], who would fit into our universe very well," Brooks said. The episode was written by Tim Long, and directed by Nancy Kruse, and guest starred crossword puzzle creators Merl Reagle and Will Shortz as themselves.

Creadon and his wife, producer Christine O'Malley, borrowed $100,000 from family and friends to make Wordplay over the course of 2005–06.

== Critical response ==
National Board of Review nomination "Best Documentary 2006"
Critics Choice Award nomination "Best Documentary 2006"
Grand Jury Prize nomination at Sundance "Best American Documentary 2006"
Rottentomatoes.com – "Golden Tomato Award For Best Reviewed Documentary of 2006"

The movie focuses on the following crossword solvers:

- Ellen Ripstein: editor living in New York City and 2001 ACPT champion. She is also known for her baton twirling.
- Trip Payne: professional puzzlemaker living in South Florida and three-time ACPT champion. He held the record as the youngest champion after winning the tournament in 1993 at the age of 24.
- Tyler Hinman: student at Rensselaer Polytechnic Institute in Troy, New York. At the 2005 ACPT, he challenged Trip Payne for the title of youngest champion ever.
- Jon Delfin: pianist living in New York City and seven-time ACPT champion.
- Al Sanders: project manager at Hewlett-Packard in Fort Collins, Colorado. He is a frequent finalist at the ACPT.

The film contains appearances by many celebrity fans of the Times puzzle, including Bill Clinton, Bob Dole, Jon Stewart, Ken Burns, Mike Mussina, Daniel Okrent, and the Indigo Girls.

Wordplay features a theme song, "Every Word", written and performed by Gary Louris of The Jayhawks. The Wordplay DVD features a music video of "Every Word".

On review aggregator website Rotten Tomatoes, the film holds an approval rating of 94% based on 121 reviews, with an average rating of 7.5/10.
