= American Crossword Puzzle Tournament =

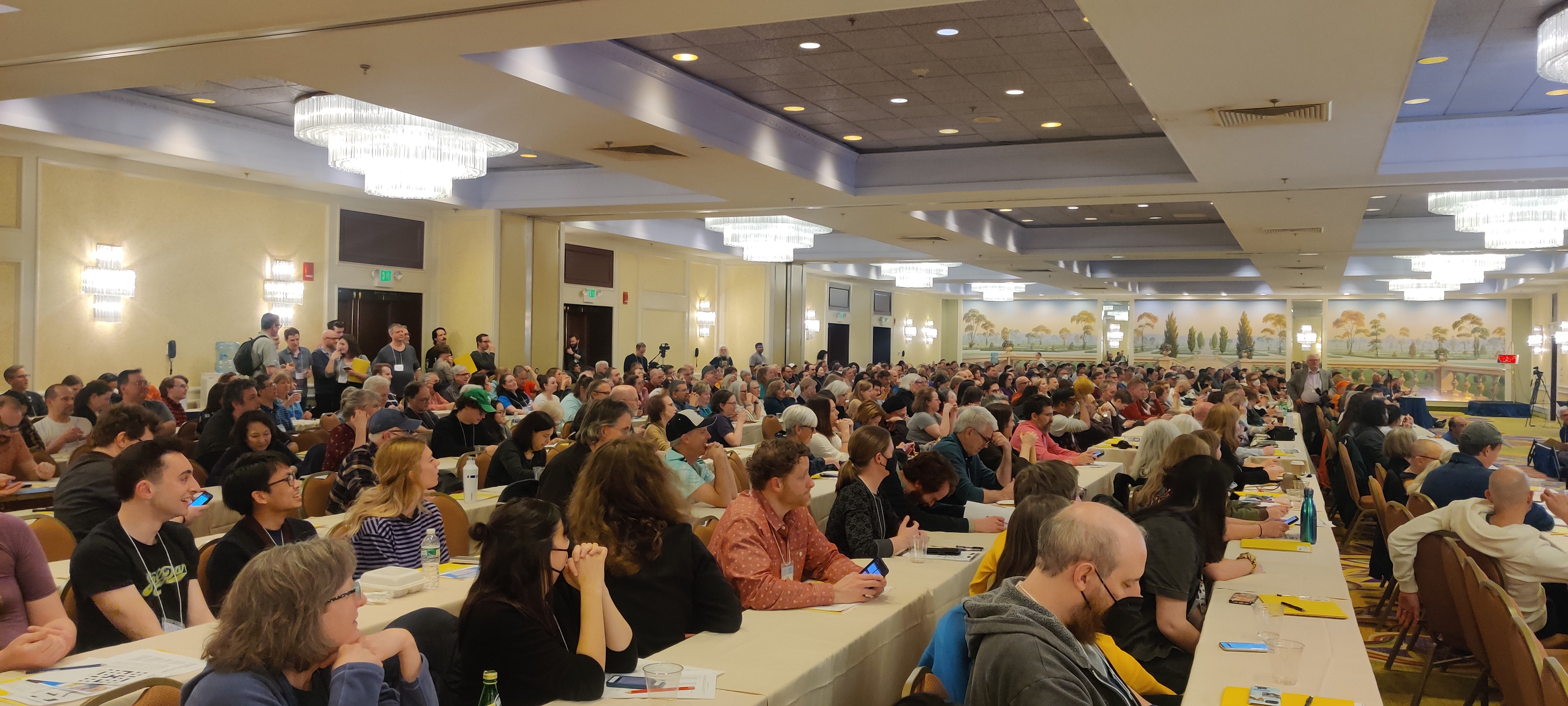
Contestants at the 2023 American Crossword Puzzle Tournament during Friday night warm-up puzzles

The American Crossword Puzzle Tournament (ACPT) is a crossword-solving tournament held annually in February, March, or April. Founded in 1978 by Will Shortz, who still directs the tournament, it is the oldest and largest crossword tournament held in the United States; the 2023 event set an attendance record with more than 750 competitors.

For its first 30 years the contest was held at the Marriott in Stamford, Connecticut, but owing to increasing popularity, in 2008 it moved to the larger Marriott Brooklyn Bridge in Brooklyn, New York. In 2015, the tournament returned to Stamford. In 2027, it will be held in Philadelphia.

The tournament traditionally begins Friday evening with social games and a wine-and-cheese reception. More games are played on Saturday evening, many of them adaptations of television game shows.

Due to the COVID-19 pandemic, the 2020 tournament was canceled. In April 2021, the 43rd tournament was held virtually. The tournament resumed in person in 2022.

== Participants and divisions ==
Anyone can participate, although registration is limited. Participants compete as members of at least two divisions, with prizes awarded based on division. All participants are members of Division A and a regional division; those 25 years old or younger, or at least 50, are also members of an age division. Membership in Divisions B–E and the Rookie Division is based on the participant's past or present tournament status. For the purposes of prizes contestants compete simultaneously in all divisions for which they are eligible, with no more than one cash prize per contestant.

The 11 regional divisions include ten U.S. divisions and a "Foreign" division for the rest of the world. Geographically, three of the 10 U.S. divisions – West, Midwest, and South – span most of the country. The remaining seven divisions are in the northeastern United States, with three of the seven located in the state of New York.

Division	Definition	
A	Everyone	
B	Contestants who have not won a Division A or Division B prize during their last seven tournaments	
C	Contestants who have not finished in the top 20% during their last three tournaments	
D	Contestants who have not finished in the top 40% during their last three tournaments	
E	Contestants who have not finished in the top 65% during their last three tournaments	
Age; Divisions	Juniors	25 years and under
Age; Divisions	Fifties	50–59 years old
Age; Divisions	Sixties	60–69 years old
Age; Divisions	Seventies	70–79 years old
Age; Divisions	Seniors	80+ years old
11 Regional Divisions (locations in italics are for illustrative purposes only)
11 Regional Divisions (locations in italics are for illustrative purposes only)	(Northeast)	New York City, Long Island, Westchester/Upstate New York, New Jersey, Connecticut, Other New England, Other Mid-Atlantic
11 Regional Divisions (locations in italics are for illustrative purposes only)	South	Texas, Oklahoma, Arkansas, Louisiana, Kentucky, Tennessee, Mississippi, Alabama, North Carolina, South Carolina, Georgia, Florida
11 Regional Divisions (locations in italics are for illustrative purposes only)	Midwest	Minnesota, Iowa, Missouri, Michigan, Wisconsin, Illinois, Indiana, Ohio
11 Regional Divisions (locations in italics are for illustrative purposes only)	West	Washington, Oregon, California, Nevada, Idaho, Utah, Arizona, Montana, Wyoming, Colorado, New Mexico, North Dakota, South Dakota, Nebraska, Kansas, Alaska, Hawaii
11 Regional Divisions (locations in italics are for illustrative purposes only)	Foreign	(outside of the United States)
Rookies	Contestants competing for their first time. Rookies are not eligible for "D" or "E" prizes.	

In 2024 a "Pairs" division was added in which pairs of individuals work collaboratively to solve the same puzzles solved by the individual participants. Scoring and other rules are the same. Pairs participants are not included in the various geographic and age divisions.

== Format ==
The main part of the tournament consists of seven rounds, each featuring a puzzle that all competitors solve. There are three rounds in the late morning and three in the early afternoon on Saturday, and the seventh round is on Sunday. Puzzles vary in size and difficulty from round to round. The puzzles are commissioned by Shortz from the top constructors in crosswords, with the fifth puzzle the hardest of the first six. The two three-round sessions consist of puzzles with 15, 17 and 19 squares in each row and column respectively. The Sunday puzzle is appropriately 21 x 21 squares, the size of regulation Sunday puzzles in newspapers. Tournament judges score the solved puzzles on accuracy and speed, and the puzzles are scanned and ranked. Judges typically include many of the nation's most prolific and/or well known crossword constructors and editors.

After these seven rounds, the top three solvers in the top three divisions progress to the final round, which consists of solving a very difficult crossword of 15 × 15 size on an oversize grid on a stage at the front of the tournament room. The competitors in this round wear noise-blocking headphones so that a team of commentators can remark upon the action for the spectators. The solvers hold a sheet of clues and write their answers on the grid with a dry-erase marker for all to see. Accuracy and speed are important as the competitors are ranked by fewest mistakes, then time. The winner of this round is declared the U.S. crossword tournament champion. The top three competitors in the B and C divisions also compete on the same puzzle, though with different sets of clues, for their division titles.

== Tournament history ==
As of 2026, there are eight multiple winners: Dan Feyer (9 tournaments), Tyler Hinman (7), Jon Delfin (7), Douglas Hoylman (6), David Rosen (4), Trip Payne (3), Paolo Pasco (2), and Erik Agard (2). Three women have won the tournament: Nancy Schuster in 1978, Miriam Raphael in 1979, and Ellen Ripstein in 2001. 22 of the 76 (29%) second- and third-place finishers have been female.

A plot of the total number of contestants attending the American Crossword Puzzle Tournament

A bar chart of the top American Crossword Puzzle Tournament 1st-place winners

Year	Contestants	Location	Winner	Runners-up (in order)
1978	149	Stamford, Connecticut	Nancy Schuster (1)	Eleanor Cassidy, Murray Leavitt
1979	154	Stamford, Connecticut	Miriam Raphael (1)	Nancy Schuster, Merl Reagle
1980	128	Stamford, Connecticut	Daniel Pratt (1)	Miriam Raphael, Joel Darrow
1981	125	Stamford, Connecticut	Philip Cohen (1)	Joel Darrow, John Chervokas
1982	132	Stamford, Connecticut	Stanley Newman (1)	Philip Cohen, Joseph Clonick
1983	146	Stamford, Connecticut	David Rosen (1)	Stanley Newman, Ellen Ripstein
1984	115	Stamford, Connecticut	John McNeill (1)	David Rosen, Stanley Newman
1985	110	Stamford, Connecticut	David Rosen (2)	Rebecca Kornbluh, Eric Schwartz
1986	130	Stamford, Connecticut	David Rosen (3)	Rebecca Kornbluh, Ellen Ripstein
1987	118	Stamford, Connecticut	David Rosen (4)	Ellen Ripstein, Ed Bethea
1988	137	Stamford, Connecticut	Douglas Hoylman (1)	Jon Delfin, Ellen Ripstein
1989	134	Stamford, Connecticut	Jon Delfin (1)	Douglas Hoylman, Ellen Ripstein
1990	143	Stamford, Connecticut	Jon Delfin (2)	Ellen Ripstein, Douglas Hoylman
1991	149	Stamford, Connecticut	Jon Delfin (3)	George Henschel, Douglas Hoylman
1992	172	Stamford, Connecticut	Douglas Hoylman (2)	Ellen Ripstein, Trip Payne
1993	192	Stamford, Connecticut	Trip Payne (1)	Ellen Ripstein, Douglas Hoylman
1994	216	Stamford, Connecticut	Douglas Hoylman (3)	Al Sanders, George Henschel
1995	232	Stamford, Connecticut	Jon Delfin (4)	Douglas Hoylman, Ellen Ripstein
1996	239	Stamford, Connecticut	Douglas Hoylman (4)	Trip Payne, Jon Delfin
1997	255	Stamford, Connecticut	Douglas Hoylman (5)	Ellen Ripstein, Trip Payne
1998	251	Stamford, Connecticut	Trip Payne (2)	Jon Delfin, Ellen Ripstein
1999	254	Stamford, Connecticut	Jon Delfin (5)	Douglas Hoylman, Al Sanders
2000	286	Stamford, Connecticut	Douglas Hoylman (6)	Ellen Ripstein, Trip Payne
2001	310	Stamford, Connecticut	Ellen Ripstein (1)	Patrick Jordan, Al Sanders
2002	401	Stamford, Connecticut	Jon Delfin (6)	Zack Butler, Al Sanders
2003	495	Stamford, Connecticut	Jon Delfin (7)	Trip Payne, Al Sanders
2004	478	Stamford, Connecticut	Trip Payne (3)	Jon Delfin, Al Sanders
2005	455	Stamford, Connecticut	Tyler Hinman (1)	Trip Payne, Al Sanders
2006	498	Stamford, Connecticut	Tyler Hinman (2)	Kiran Kedlaya, Ellen Ripstein
2007	698	Stamford, Connecticut	Tyler Hinman (3)	Al Sanders, Francis Heaney
2008	699	Brooklyn, New York	Tyler Hinman (4)	Trip Payne, Howard Barkin
2009	675	Brooklyn, New York	Tyler Hinman (5)	Trip Payne, Francis Heaney
2010	643	Brooklyn, New York	Dan Feyer (1)	Howard Barkin, Anne Erdmann
2011	655	Brooklyn, New York	Dan Feyer (2)	Tyler Hinman, Anne Erdmann
2012	592	Brooklyn, New York	Dan Feyer (3)	Tyler Hinman, Anne Erdmann
2013	572	Brooklyn, New York	Dan Feyer (4)	Anne Erdmann, Tyler Hinman
2014	580	Brooklyn, New York	Dan Feyer (5)	Tyler Hinman, Howard Barkin
2015	567	Stamford, Connecticut	Dan Feyer (6)	Tyler Hinman, Howard Barkin
2016	575	Stamford, Connecticut	Howard Barkin (1)	Dan Feyer, David Plotkin
2017	619	Stamford, Connecticut	Dan Feyer (7)	Joon Pahk, Tyler Hinman
2018	674	Stamford, Connecticut	Erik Agard (1)	Dan Feyer, David Plotkin
2019	741	Stamford, Connecticut	Dan Feyer (8)	Joon Pahk, David Plotkin
2020	No tournament due to COVID-19			
2021	1287	Online	Tyler Hinman (6)	Erik Agard, David Plotkin
2022	474	Stamford, Connecticut	Tyler Hinman (7)	Dan Feyer, David Plotkin
2023	775	Stamford, Connecticut	Dan Feyer (9)	Paolo Pasco, Tyler Hinman
2024	805	Stamford, Connecticut	Paolo Pasco (1)	David Plotkin, Will Nediger
2025	889	Stamford, Connecticut	Paolo Pasco (2)	Will Nediger, Dan Feyer
2026	915	Stamford, Connecticut	Erik Agard (2)	Will Nediger, David Plotkin

== 2006 documentary ==
The 2006 documentary Wordplay, directed by Patrick Creadon, focuses on Will Shortz and the 2005 American Crossword Puzzle Tournament. It includes interviews with many of the top competitors and climaxes with the final round of the 2005 tournament. The DVD release includes video from the final round of the 2006 tournament. Shortz credits the film as the main reason for the dramatically increased attendance (an increase of 200 contestants) at the 2007 event, which necessitated the subsequent move to Brooklyn.

== Dr. Fill ==
Dr. Fill, a computer program, was an unofficial competitor from 2012 to 2021. In 2021, Dr. Fill outscored all human competitors for the first time.

== MEmoRiaL Award ==
The MEmoRiaL Award "for lifetime achievement in crossword construction", named in honor of Merl Reagle, has been presented at the tournament since 2016.

- 2016 – Maura Jacobson
- 2017 – Manny Nosowsky
- 2018 – Nancy Salomon
- 2019 – Mike Shenk
- 2021 – Patrick Berry
- 2022 – Emily Cox and Henry Rathvon
- 2023 – Rich Norris
- 2024 – Andrea Carla Michaels
- 2025 – Stanley Newman
- 2026 – Lynn Lempel
