= Online platforms of The New York Times =

Newspaper online services

The online platforms of The New York Times encompass the established applications, websites, and other online services developed by The New York Times for its operations.

== Website ==
nytimes.com in March 2024

nytimes.com has undergone several major redesigns and infrastructure developments since its debut in January 1996. In April 2006, The New York Times redesigned its website with an emphasis on multimedia. In preparation for Super Tuesday in February 2008, the Times developed a live election system using the Associated Press's File Transfer Protocol (FTP) service and a Ruby on Rails application; nytimes.com experienced its largest traffic on Super Tuesday and the day after.

nytimes.com is supported by online advertising and subscriptions. In response to legislation such as the General Data Protection Regulation in the European Union and California Consumer Privacy Act in California, The New York Times developed its own advertising data program for its direct-sold advertising business in June 2020.

The New York Times began using live blogs as chats for the 2012 Republican Party presidential debates, later using Slack for the 2016 Republican debates, and covered the November 2015 Paris attacks with a live blog. Live blogs begin with a primary post affixed before the live updates to overview the event. The Times has used several other live formats, including a live chat—used during the inauguration of Joe Biden to provide side-by-side commentary with live coverage, a live briefing—used during the COVID-19 pandemic for incremental updates over a longer span of time, and a live blog—used during the trial of Derek Chauvin for quickly-changing events. Live blogs feature long-form articles woven with short observations. The COVID-19 pandemic shifted The New York Times's approach, requiring synchronous collaboration from reporters in different time zones and necessitating the use of email, encrypted apps, chat groups, Google Docs, and phones; the live briefing for the pandemic is the longest-running briefing the Times has run. The COVID-19 pandemic involved the use of relays from New York to Hong Kong, Seoul, and London.

The New York Times added an anonymous tip page in December 2016 with support for WhatsApp, Signal, encrypted email, and SecureDrop as part of an initiative by deputy investigations editor Gabriel Dance and then-information security director Runa Sandvik. By March 2017, the additional channels had revealed audio from Hillary Clinton in reaction to the 2016 Democratic National Committee email leak, queries from Donald Trump's transition team indicating skepticism of foreign aid, and regulations preventing Wells Fargo from offering severance pay in the aftermath of a cross-selling scandal in September 2016. The article on the Federal Bureau of Investigation's raid of Michael Cohen's office began with an online tip. The Times receives hundreds of tip submissions per day. The submissions were initially added to a spreadsheet managed by Dance, but are now added to a database. In October 2017, The New York Times added Tor network support to nytimes.com using Enterprise Onion Toolkit. The Times rebuilt its Onion service and issued a new address in 2021.

In late 2007, The New York Times introduced a comments section to its articles. The Times's comments section is manually moderated; as of 2017, twelve moderators are responsible for approving comments at a rate of twelve thousand comments per day. The New York Times's comment section does not tolerate, among other things, personal attacks, obscenities, and profanity, in an effort to ensure cogency. The moderation team uses an internal rulebook to determine potentially rule-breaking comments. In one comment, the community desk questioned the use of the word "prostitute" in a comment critiquing Republican lawmakers for having "sold themselves to the privileged few", with one moderator stating that it was acceptable as a verb. The comment was rejected nonetheless. Comments are enabled on an individual basis. As a result, fewer articles are opened for comments on weekends. In June 2017, The New York Times partnered with Jigsaw and Instrument to develop Moderator, a moderation tool that uses machine learning trained on the Times's sixteen million comments to determine if a comment should be approved. The introduction of Moderator allowed the Times to expand the number of articles with comments enabled.

== Applications ==
The NYTimes application debuted with the introduction of the App Store on July 10, 2008. Engadget's Scott McNulty wrote critically of the app, negatively comparing it to The New York Times's mobile website. An iPad version with select articles was released on April 3, 2010, with the release of the first-generation iPad. In October, The New York Times expanded NYT Editors' Choice to include the paper's full articles. NYT for iPad was free until 2011. The Times applications on iPhone and iPad began offering in-app subscriptions in July 2011. The Times released a web application for iPad—featuring a format summarizing trending headlines on Twitter—and a Windows 8 application in October 2012.

Efforts to ensure profitability through an online magazine and a "Need to Know" subscription emerged in Adweek in July 2013. In March 2014, The New York Times announced three applications—NYT Now, an application that offers pertinent news in a blog format, and two unnamed applications, later known as NYT Opinion and NYT Cooking—to diversify its product laterals.

== Podcasts ==
The Daily is the modern front page of The New York Times.

— Sam Dolnick, speaking to Intelligencer in January 2020

The New York Times manages several podcasts, including multiple podcasts with Serial Productions. The Times's longest-running podcast is The Book Review Podcast, debuting as Inside The New York Times Book Review in April 2006.

The New York Times's defining podcast is The Daily, a daily news podcast hosted by Michael Barbaro and, since March 2022, Sabrina Tavernise. The podcast debuted on February 1, 2017.

In October 2021, The New York Times began testing "New York Times Audio", an application featuring podcasts from the Times, audio versions of articles—including from other publications through Audm, and archives from This American Life. The application debuted in May 2023 exclusively on iOS for Times subscribers. New York Times Audio includes exclusive podcasts such as The Headlines, a daily news recap, and Shorts, short audio stories under ten minutes. In addition, a "Reporter Reads" section features Times journalists reading their articles and providing commentary.

== Games ==
The New York Times has used video games as part of its journalistic efforts, among the first publications to do so, contributing to an increase in Internet traffic. The Times began publishing Persuasive Games's newsgames in May 2007, including Food Import Folly, a video game about the Food and Drug Administration's import inspection process. The New York Times released Gauging Your Distraction, a video game about mobile phones and driving safety developed by psychology professors David Strayer and David E. Meyer, in July 2009. In November 2016, the Times released The Voter Suppression Trail, a video game inspired by The Oregon Trail (1985). In the game, players play as either a white programmer from California, a Latina nurse from Texas, or an African-American salesman from Wisconsin, and attempt to vote in the 2016 presidential election. While the white programmer is able to vote with ease, the Latina nurse and African-American salesman experience long voting lines, strict voter identification laws, and election observers supportive of Donald Trump. The Voter Suppression Trail was developed by Chris Baker, Brian Moore, and Mike Lacher of GOP Arcade and is the first game to debut on the Op-Docs page.

The New York Times has developed its own video games. In 2014, The New York Times Magazine introduced Spelling Bee, a word game in which players guess words from a set of letters in a honeycomb and are awarded points for the length of the word and receive extra points if the word is a pangram. The game was proposed by Will Shortz, created by Frank Longo, and has been maintained by Sam Ezersky. In May 2018, Spelling Bee was published on nytimes.com, furthering its popularity. In February 2019, the Times introduced Letter Boxed (in which players form words from letters placed on the edges of a square box), followed in June 2019 by Tiles (a matching game in which players form sequences of tile pairings), and Vertex (in which players connect vertices to assemble an image). In July 2023, The New York Times introduced Connections, in which players identify groups of words that are connected by a common property. In April, the Times introduced Digits, a number-based game; Digits was shut down in August.

In January 2022, The New York Times Company acquired Wordle, a word game developed by Josh Wardle in 2021, at a valuation in the "low-seven figures". The acquisition was proposed by David Perpich, a member of the Sulzberger family who proposed the purchase to Knight over Slack after reading about the game. The Washington Post purportedly considered acquiring Wordle, according to Vanity Fair. At the 2022 Game Developers Conference, Wardle stated that he was overwhelmed by the volume of Wordle facsimiles and overzealous monetization practices in other games. Concerns over The New York Times monetizing Wordle by implementing a paywall mounted; Wordle is a client-side browser game and can be played offline by downloading its webpage. Wordle moved to the Times's servers and website in February. The game was added to the NYT Games application in August, necessitating it be rewritten in the JavaScript library React. In November, The New York Times announced that Tracy Bennett would be the Wordle's editor.

In April 2009, The New York Times released a crossword application for iOS developed by Magmic. A sudoku application developed by Magmic was released in October. NYT Crosswords debuted on the Google Play Store in November 2016. In April 2017, the application was added to the Amazon Appstore. NYT Crosswords supports saving across devices and nytimes.com. In March 2023, NYT Crosswords was renamed to NYT Games to address the application's other games, including Wordle, Spelling Bee, Tiles, and Sudoku. According to Jonathan Knight, chief executive of The New York Times Games, the Times was concerned over how the application would rank in search results for "crossword". In May 2007, The New York Times released The New York Times Crosswords for the Nintendo DS. The game, developed by Budcat Creations and published by Majesco, features The New York Times crossword puzzles from March 2004 to November 2006. The New York Times Crosswords includes a campaign mode, in which the player solves seven successive puzzles with increasing difficulty.

== Social media ==
In October 2017, The New York Times issued guidelines for its journalists, exercising neutrality, transparency, and professionalism. The Times revised its guidelines in November 2020 to reflect the use of blocking and muting on Twitter. Then-executive editor Dean Baquet urged journalists to use social media less in a letter to employees in April 2022, removing the requirement to maintain a presence on social media. The letter followed a public feud between outgoing technology reporter Taylor Lorenz and White House correspondent Maggie Haberman on Twitter and the resignations of opinion editors James Bennet and Bari Weiss in 2020 following backlash online; Lorenz faced social media harassment following a segment on Tucker Carlson Tonight in March 2021, in which eponymous host Tucker Carlson accused Lorenz of being privileged. The New York Times subsequently released a statement defending Lorenz and calling Carlson's comments "calculated and cruel". Baquet additionally announced an initiative to support journalists experiencing harassment. Times reporter Ryan Mac was among several journalists suspended on Twitter in December 2022. @nytimesworld was mistakenly suspended in November 2017 after tweeting about Canadian prime minister Justin Trudeau's apology to indigenous peoples in Newfoundland and Labrador.

The New York Times maintains a social media presence for breaking news events and has fifty-five million followers on Twitter as of March 2023. Following reports that Twitter would charge businesses US$1,000 per month to retain their verification status in February 2023, The New York Times stated that it would not pay for verification in a statement in April. Twitter chief executive Elon Musk removed @nytimes's verification status after the statement was released, though it was reinstated later that month. Other affiliated accounts, such as @nytimesarts, retained their verification status. Musk repeatedly insulted the Times after making the decision, writing that the paper was "propaganda". In August, Musk criticized The New York Times for publishing an article describing South African political party Economic Freedom Fighters leader Julius Malema's chants of dubul' ibhunu as a literal call to violence; the article quoted Musk as stating that Malema was advocating for white genocide. A report from The Washington Post revealed that Twitter was throttling links by five seconds to the Times from its link shortener t.co. In October, @nytimes's verification status was removed.

== Virtual and augmented reality ==
In February 2018, The New York Times published an augmented reality article for iOS devices, allowing readers to view three-dimensional models of Olympic athletes Nathan Chen, J. R. Celski, Alex Rigsby, and Anna Gasser. Augmented reality technology was used in a David Bowie feature in March, with support for Android's ARCore platform.

== Other services ==
In June 2012, The New York Times signed a content deal with news aggregation service Flipboard, allowing users to read content from the Times on the service. The New York Times Company and German mass media company Axel Springer invested US$3.8 million in Dutch online news platform Blendle, a service that allows users to pay for access to individual articles, acquiring a joint stake in the company. The New York Times signed a deal to license its content on Blendle in the Netherlands and Germany by 2015. Blendle debuted in the United States in March 2016 with the Times, The Wall Street Journal, The Economist, and the Financial Times, releasing a mobile application in May. In March 2011, Amazon announced that subscriptions to The New York Times through its Kindle e-readers would grant access to nytimes.com, followed by the Barnes & Noble Nook in April. In March 2023, Amazon ceased sales on newspaper subscriptions through Kindle Newsstand and canceled existing subscriptions in September. In February 2013, the Times offered fifteen free articles to Starbucks customers per day, an offer added to the company's loyalty program in 2016.

The New York Times was formerly available on Apple's news aggregator service Apple News and was among several publications to partner with Apple, debuting with the service in November 2015. A study by the Tow Center for Digital Journalism found that the Times was among the largest publications on Apple News. In March 2019, The New York Times dramatically reduced the coverage it provides to Apple ahead of the company's announcement of a subscription service for Apple News; then-chief executive officer Mark Thompson stated that the Times should be "intelligent in the way [it thinks] about [its] partnerships with these platforms" and announced a similar reduction it would impose on Facebook. The New York Times was not included in Apple News+. In June 2020, the Times ceased distributing its articles in Apple News. Then-chief operating officer Meredith Kopit Levien stated that Apple News does not allow for the Times to control the "presentation of [its] report". Apple told The Verge that The New York Times only provided a few stories per day. In May 2023, The Wall Street Journal reported that The New York Times Company had signed an agreement with Google to feature the Times's content on Google News for US$100 million over three years. In December, Wirecutter and The Athletic joined Apple News+.
