= The New York Times Games =

Casual games by The New York Times

- Developer: The New York Times Company
- Publisher: The New York Times
- Platforms: Newspaper; Web iOS; Android
- Release: August 21, 2014
- Genre: Various
- Modes: Single-player, Multi-player

The New York Times Games (NYT Games) is a collection of casual print and online games published by The New York Times, an American newspaper. Originating with the newspaper's crossword puzzle in 1942, NYT Games was officially established on August 21, 2014, with the addition of the Mini Crossword. Most puzzles of The New York Times Games are published and refreshed daily, mirroring The Times' daily newspaper cadence. Its most popular game is Wordle.

The New York Times Games is part of a concerted effort by the paper to raise its digital subscription as its print-based sales dwindle. Since its launch, NYT Games has reached viral popularity and has become one of the main revenue drivers for The New York Times. As of 2024, NYT Games has over 10 million daily players across all platforms and over one million premium subscribers. According to one member of staff, "the half joke that is repeated internally is that The New York Times is now a gaming company that also happens to offer news."

== History ==
=== 1942–2014: The New York Times Crossword ===
Although crosswords became popular in the early 1920s, The New York Times initially considered them frivolous, calling them "a primitive form of mental exercise", and did not run a crossword until February 15, 1942, in its Sunday edition. It was published under a pseudonym Farrar occasionally used, "Anna Gram".

The motivating impulse for the Times to finally run the puzzle (which took over 20 years even though its publisher, Arthur Hays Sulzberger, was a longtime crossword fan) appears to have been the bombing of Pearl Harbor; in a memo dated December 18, 1941, an editor conceded that the puzzle deserved space in the paper, considering what was happening elsewhere in the world and that readers might need something to occupy themselves during blackouts. The puzzle proved popular, and Sulzberger himself authored a Times puzzle before the year was out.

The New York Times has used video games as part of its journalistic efforts, among the first publications to do so, contributing to an increase in Internet traffic; In the late 1990s and early 2000s, The New York Times began offering its newspaper online, and along with it the crossword puzzles, allowing readers to solve puzzles on their computers. This marked the beginning of a digital expansion that would later include a variety of games beyond crosswords.

=== 2014–2022: Release ===
In 2014, The New York Times officially launched The New York Times Games with the addition of the Mini Crossword. In the same year, The New York Times Magazine introduced Spelling Bee, a word game in which players guess words from a set of letters in a honeycomb and are awarded points for the length of the word and receive extra points if the word is a pangram. The game was proposed by Will Shortz, created by Frank Longo, and has been maintained by Sam Ezersky. In May 2018, Spelling Bee was published on NYTimes.com, furthering its popularity. In February 2019, the Times introduced Letter Boxed, in which players form words from letters placed on the edges of a square box, followed in June 2019 by Tiles, a matching game in which players form sequences of tile pairings, and Vertex, in which players connect vertices to assemble an image.

=== 2022–2024: Acquisition of Wordle ===
In January 2022, The New York Times Company acquired Wordle, a word game developed by Josh Wardle in 2021, at a valuation in the "low-seven figures". The acquisition was proposed by David Perpich, a member of the Sulzberger family who proposed the purchase to Knight over Slack after reading about the game. The Washington Post purportedly considered acquiring Wordle, according to Vanity Fair. At the 2022 Game Developers Conference, Wardle stated that he was overwhelmed by the volume of Wordle facsimiles and overzealous monetization practices in other games. Concerns over The New York Times monetizing Wordle by implementing a paywall mounted; Wordle is a client-side browser game and can be played offline by downloading its webpage. Wordle moved to the Times's servers and website in February. The game was added to the NYT Games application in August, necessitating it be rewritten in the JavaScript library React. In November, The New York Times announced that Tracy Bennett would be Wordle's editor.

In March 2023, the NYT Crosswords app was renamed to NYT Games to address the application's other games, including Wordle, Spelling Bee, Tiles, and Sudoku. According to Jonathan Knight, chief executive of The New York Times Games, the Times was concerned over how the application would rank in search results for "crossword". In April, the Times introduced Digits, a number-based game; Digits was shut down in August 2023. In July 2023, The New York Times introduced Connections, in which players identify groups of words that are connected by a common property.

=== 2024–present: Further growth ===
In 2024, NYT Games playerbase grew exponentially. In June 2025, according to official statistics of the previous year shared with The Verge by New York Times spokesperson Jordan Cohen, NYT Games puzzles were played 11.1 billion times, while Wordle, Connections, and Strands were played 5.3 billion, 3.3 billion, and 1.3 billion times, respectively.

In March 2024, The New York Times introduced the beta game Strands, a word game in which players connect letters in a grid to reveal a group of words sharing a common theme. It left the beta stage and became a full game in late June 2024 while also being added to the NYT Games app. In August 2024, it was announced that Vertex would be discontinued at the end of the month. In September 2024, The Athletic, in partnership with The New York Times Games, launched a sports edition of Connections in beta. The next month, Zorse, a phrase guessing game where every puzzle is a mash-up of two phrases, entered beta in Canada. Connections: Sports Edition officially launched on February 9, 2025, to coincide with Super Bowl LIX.

On April 18, 2025, Pips, a logic puzzle in which players place dominoes on a gameboard in order to satisfy certain conditions, entered beta in Canada; On June 10, 2025, NYT Crossplay, a multiplayer word game with gameplay similar to Scrabble and Words with Friends, was launched in beta in New Zealand on iOS. Crossplay is their first standalone app outside the NYT Games app. On August 18, 2025, Pips left beta and was officially launched; the launch made Pips the second logic puzzle besides Sudoku on NYT Games, and its first original logic puzzle. By the end of August 2025, the Mini Crossword was changed from free-to-play to requiring a subscription to play daily, with Tiles and Letter Boxed also moving behind the subscription. Additionally, the Spelling Bee no longer allowed players to play for free to the "Good" or "Solid" levels, instead only allowing a few word plays before requiring a subscription. In September 2025, a Strands archive was introduced.

Crossplay left beta and launched in the United States on January 21, 2026. The following month, a mid-sized variant of the crossword, the Midi was launched as a digital-only puzzle. Midi crosswords were previously available as purchasable packs from 2015–2021, and as a weekly puzzle in the New York Times gameplay newsletter from July 2025 until the daily launch.

== List of games ==
=== NYT Games app & website ===
==== Crosswords ====
Active New York Times Games
Name	Description	Subscription requirement	
Name	Description	Daily	Archives & additional
The Daily Crossword	The Crossword is a daily crossword puzzle both online and in newspaper, syndicated to more than 300 other newspapers and journals. The puzzle is created by various freelance constructors and has been edited by Will Shortz since 1993. The crosswords are designed to increase in difficulty throughout the week, with the easiest puzzle on Monday and the most difficult on Saturday. The larger Sunday crossword, which appears in The New York Times Magazine, is an icon in American culture; it is typically intended to be as difficult as a Thursday puzzle. Typically, the standard daily crossword is 15 by 15 squares, while the Sunday crossword measures 21 by 21 squares.	Yes	
The Midi Crossword	The Midi Crossword (or simply The Midi) is the mid-sized version of the Crossword edited by Ian Livengood, ranging from 9x9 to 11x11. All the puzzles are themed, and can occasionally include two-letter words or repeating answers. As well, once a week the puzzle has a visual effect at the start or end of solving.	Yes	
The Mini Crossword	The Mini Crossword (or simply The Mini) is the smaller version of the Crossword edited by Joel Fagliano, which is 5×5 Sunday through Friday and 7×7 on Saturdays, and is significantly easier than the traditional daily puzzle.	Yes	

==== Other games ====
Active New York Times Games
Name	Description	Subscription requirement	
Name	Description	Daily	Archives & additional
Spelling Bee	Spelling Bee is a word game in which players are presented with a hexagonal grid of 7 letters arrayed in a honeycomb structure. The player scores points by using the letters to form words consisting of four or more letters.	No until Good or Solid rank (~15% of points); Yes after	Yes (for 10 most recent puzzles)
Wordle	Wordle is a web-based word game created and developed by Welsh software engineer Josh Wardle. Players have six attempts to guess a five-letter word, with feedback given for each guess in the form of colored tiles indicating when letters match or occupy the correct position. The game was acquired by The New York Times in January 2022 for an undisclosed seven-figure sum; the game was moved to the Times website in February 2022. In 2024, Wordle was played 5.3 billion times.	No	Yes (for archive)
Pips	Pips is a logic puzzle in which players place dominoes on a gameboard in order to satisfy certain conditions. It entered beta on April 18, 2025, in Canada, and was officially released on August 18, 2025. Pips is NYT Games' second logic puzzle besides Sudoku, and its first original logic puzzle.	No	—N/a
Strands	Strands is a word game in which players connect letters in a grid to reveal a group of words sharing a common theme. In 2024, Strands was played 1.3 billion times.	No	Yes (for archive)
Connections	Connections is a word puzzle in which the player has four attempts to clear a grid of sixteen squares. They must select four squares at a time that fit under a specific category (e.g., dog, cat, fish, and parrot for the category "Household Pets"). It was released for PC on June 12, 2023, during its beta phase. As of 2023, it was the second most played game published by Times, behind Wordle. In 2024, 3.3 billion Connections games were successfully completed.	No	Yes (for archive)
Letter Boxed	Letter Boxed is a word puzzle that requires players to create words using letters around a square.	Yes	—N/a
Tiles	Tiles is a visual game in which players match identical shapes or backgrounds in every tile.	Yes	
Sudoku	The New York Times Games also provides Sudoku in the app and online, with puzzles split into three levels of difficulty and refreshing daily.	No (for first chosen daily level)	Yes (for the other two levels)

=== Others and betas ===
Other New York Times Games
Name	Description	Location	Status
Connections: Sports Edition	Connections: Sports Edition is the sports edition of Connections which requires knowledge of teams, athletes, coaches, records, and trivia across various sports. The game was launched in beta on September 24, 2024, in collaboration with The Athletic, and formally launched on February 9, 2025. With the game's official launch, an optional timer for completing the puzzle was added. A separate soccer-themed version was launched in June 2026 to run concurrent with the 2026 FIFA World Cup, being available for the duration of the World Cup. Because of its popularity, it continued as a daily game from July 20, following the conclusion of the World Cup.	The Athletic app & website	Public
Crossplay	Crossplay is a multiplayer word game with gameplay similar to Scrabble and Words with Friends. It was launched in beta in New Zealand on iOS. Crossplay is the first standalone app from NYT that is not folded into the main NYT Games app. Crossplay exited beta and launched in the United States on January 21, 2026.	NYT Crossplay app	Public

=== The New York Times Magazine variety puzzles ===
The smaller puzzle, which would occupy the lower part of the page, could provide variety each Sunday. It could be topical, humorous, have rhymed definitions or story definitions or quiz definitions. The combination of these two would offer meat and dessert, and catch the fancy of all types of puzzlers.

— Margaret Farrar, the Times' eventual first crossword editor, in a December 18, 1941 memo during the paper's crosswords consideration.

In addition to the primary crossword, the Times publishes a second Sunday puzzle each week of varying types in The New York Times Magazine. Currently, every other week features a rotating selection, including an acrostic (long written by Emily Cox and Henry Rathvon); other kinds of crosswords (cryptic "British-style crosswords", puns and anagrams, spiral, diagramless, etc.); word puzzles of other formats (Split Decisions, Marching Bands, etc.); and, more rarely, other types (some authored by Shortz himself—the only puzzles he has created for the Times during his tenure as crossword editor).

As well as a second word puzzle on Sundays, the Times publishes a KenKen numbers puzzle (a variant of the popular sudoku logic puzzles) each day of the week. The variety page also includes three smaller puzzles: a Spelling Bee by Frank Longo (different from the one online), one of several word puzzle formats by Patrick Berry, and a series of Japanese-style logic puzzles by Wei-Hwa Huang and others. The Times also offers a monthly bonus crossword with a theme relating to the month.

==== Acrostic puzzles ====
The acrostic, in particular, has the longest history. The puzzle began publishing on May 9, 1943, authored by Elizabeth S. Kingsley, who is credited with inventing the puzzle type, and continued to write the Times acrostic until December 28, 1952. From then until August 13, 1967, it was written by Kingsley's former assistant, Doris Nash Wortman; then it was taken over by Thomas H. Middleton for a period of over 30 years, until August 15, 1999, when the pair of Cox and Rathvon became just the fourth author of the puzzle in its history. The name of the puzzle also changed over the years, from "Double-Crostic" to "Kingsley Double-Crostic", "Acrostic Puzzle", and, finally since 1991, just "Acrostic".

=== Former ===
Former New York Times Games
Name	Description	End date	Status
Digits	Digits was a number puzzle in which players used six provided numbers and basic arithmetic (add, subtract, multiply, or divide) to reach as close to the target number as possible. Each number can only be used once. The game was launched in beta on April 10, 2023, and was shut down on August 8, 2023. Several publications commented on Digits' similarity to the "numbers" round of the British game show Countdown and its original French version, Des chiffres et des lettres.	August 8, 2023	Beta only
Vertex	Vertex was a subscription-only visual game in which players draw lines between points to create triangles, eventually revealing a hidden image. The game was one of the earlier games that was part of NYT Games growing success, offered since at least 2020. Vertex was retired in August 2024, with the last playable game August 29.	August 29, 2024	Full game
Zorse	Zorse was a phrase guessing game where every puzzle was a mash-up of two phrases. The game's name itself referenced zorse, the offspring of a zebra and a horse. It entered beta in October 8, 2024, in Canada. It was discontinued on January 13, 2025.	January 13, 2025	Beta only
Capture	Capture was a chess-themed game, involving several chess pieces capturing other pieces until only the king remains. It was launched in beta in Canada on December 15, 2025, in association with Chess.com. It was discontinued on February 27, 2026.	February 27, 2026	Beta only

== Computational complexity ==
Computer scientists have studied the computational complexity of solving several NYT Games. This allows one to understand, for example, whether a computer can solve these puzzles efficiently (i.e. with polynomial-time algorithms). Several variants of these problems are known to be computationally hard to solve.

Solving Pips puzzles is known to be NP-Complete, and hence there is no polynomial-time algorithm to solve Pips puzzles (unless P=NP). This result also applies to Pips puzzles in which all the tiles are either 1-1 (display one dot on each face) or 0-0 (display no dot on either face).

It is also NP-Complete to:

- Decide whether an instance of Strands of variable size can be covered with words in an arbitrary dictionary;
- Decide, given a dictionary $D$ and a positive integer $\ell$, whether there is a strategy that guarantees one find the secret word in Wordle (with words taken from $D$) in at most $\ell$ guesses;
- Decide whether one can solve a (variable size) Letter Boxed puzzle in at most $k$ words from a given dictionary.

For Letter Boxed, however, the problem becomes easy (polynomial-time solvable) under the assumption that some parameters of interest remain constant, for example, if the cardinality of the alphabet (the number of distinct letters used) is constant.

== Popularity ==
=== Playerbase ===
Since its inception, The New York Times Games' playerbase has grown rapidly. In 2020, more than 28 million people played at least one game. Within one year from October 2022 to 2023, the number of average daily active users in the Games app tripled from 886,000 to over 2.6 million. As of 2024, Games has over 10 million daily players across all platforms, both app and website, with 11.1 billion puzzles played. In the same year, Wordle, Connections, and Strands were played 5.3 billion, 3.3 billion, and 1.3 billion times, respectively.

=== Social ===
NYT Games has had major impact on popular culture and discourse, including online. Social media in particular contributed to its rising popularity, with users posting their NYT Games' puzzle results en masse thanks to Games' ease of sharing. Wordle results were shared 1.2 million times on Twitter (now X) between January 1 and 13, 2022, while Connections results similarly trending. On TikTok as of May 2024, 140,000 videos with the hashtag #wordle were present, with videos about Connections "regularly rack up hundreds of thousands of views". Accounts dedicated to solving NYT Games' crosswords and puzzles amassed millions of followers, with several figures converting these accounts into full-time jobs.

Thanks to its popularity, some NYT Games' editors reached celebrity status, such as Will Shortz, the NYT Crossword editor since 1993; Sam Ezersky, editor of Spelling Bee; Wyna Liu, editor of Connections; and Tracy Bennett, editor of Wordle. Some editors get tagged frequently on Twitter by their game's "die-hard" fan base, albeit sometimes negatively due to complaints about the day's puzzle construction itself.

== Impact ==
=== Cognitive ===
The rise in popularity of the NYT Games has led to increased interest in the cognitive impact daily games have on the people playing them. Regularly playing games like Connections and Crosswords require classification, pattern recognition, and problem-solving, helping players develop mental flexibility. Even if players don't solve a puzzle specifically, they often expand their knowledge by learning new words or concepts. Another cognitive benefit is overcoming mental resistance. Connections pushes players to engage in difficult tasks, challenging the human tendency to avoid discomfort. This mental exercise strengthens perseverance and adaptability, which are valuable cognitive skills. Beyond these skill enhancements, regular puzzle-solving has been associated with slower brain shrinkage, particularly in the hippocampus and cortex, with crossword solvers showing 0.5% to 1% less shrinkage over 18 months. While there are proven cognitive benefits for older adults, the impact on people with normal cognition is less studied. However, the problem-solving and memory benefits likely extend to younger individuals as well and can serve as a productive break from passive screen time, providing mental stimulation instead of aimless scrolling.

=== User experience research ===
The New York Times Games employs editors and a structured research process to develop and refine its games. For games like Wordle, editor Tracy Bennett works roughly one month in advance, and spends around two hours every week selecting and arranging the upcoming words for the game. The process involves randomly selecting candidate words from a database, researching their meanings, and evaluating the different letter combinations to identify potential "lucky guess" words that could take on user strategy.

User feedback also plays a key role in the development process. The Times collects responses from players through various forms such as community forums, social media, and direct emails. From there, they review this feedback weekly to identify any recurring concerns or themes. In response to player feedback, specifically through experiments with holiday-related words, the Times decided to avoid themed puzzles for Wordle as they received negative responses from players who felt it disrupted the game's random nature.

Since early 2023, the Times has implemented an external testing process for Wordle and other games. Approximately 35 testers receive puzzles three to four weeks before public release. Their role is to provide feedback that helps decide difficulty levels and establish variety through puzzles. Along with qualitative feedback, the development team also utilizes quantitative data such as solve rates to guide improvements that balance analytics and creativity.

According to Everdeen Mason, editorial director for NYT Games, "Data is very important in what we do... But I really want [the editors] to have a lot of creative freedom and passion, because I think it does make the puzzles better."

The New York Times Games team occasionally publishes research about technical experiments it conducts. In 2024, NYT Games AI Engineer Shafik Quoraishee published an in depth article on introducing handwriting recognition via on-device AI models onto the New York Times Games App Crosswords. Shafik and Wyna have also collaborated on building tools that aide puzzle analysis and research for Connections. The Times has also published details on experimentation regarding Connections and graph neural networks.

=== Business impact and revenue ===
Games has become one of the main revenue drivers for The New York Times. As of 2023, NYT Games has "over one million" premium subscribers, with then chief product officer Alex Hardiman credited Games as one of the large factor in the Times' overarching news subscriber growth, mentioning "a lot of people are actually buying the bundle through our Games product." In an SEC filing, Games has more popularity and interaction than any other products The New York Times offers, including its core news offering. According to one member of staff, "The half joke that is repeated internally is that The New York Times is now a gaming company that also happens to offer news," as reportedly "[p]eople who engage with both news and games on any given week have the best long-term subscriber retention of any product combination". First-party advertising campaigns on NYT Games website have above-average level of awareness, attributed to "the brief nature of the Times' puzzles, which are designed to be completed in a matter of minutes, [which] also means they elicit a heightened level of focus from players".
