= Letter Boxed =

Online word puzzle by the New York Times

The New York Times Letter Boxed
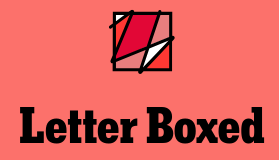
- Developer: Sam Ezersky
- Publisher: New York Times Company
- Platforms: Browser, Mobile App
- Release: 2019
- Genre: Word game
- Mode: Single player

Letter Boxed is an online word puzzle video game created by Sam Ezersky and published in 2019 (soft-launched in 2018) on The New York Times Games. It was the third game published in the puzzles section on the New York Times website after the Crossword and Spelling Bee. Originally created as part of an effort to attract new subscribers, Letter Boxed is one of a suite of casual games that has become an important revenue driver for the company, and for which "The New York Times has attained the reputation for having fun, quick and easy daily games."

== Gameplay ==
A partially completed game of Letter Boxed from March 12, 2024

Players are given a square with three letters per side (12 letters in total). Starting anywhere, they must connect the letters to make words of at least three letters. The goal is to use all of the letters at least once, in as few words as possible – equal to or below the target number set by the game (usually within 4, 5, or 6 words). The first letter of each new word must be the last letter of the previous word. Consecutive use of letters from the same side is not permitted (which precludes the use of double letter words such as "Brilliantly", "Formatted", or "Dazzle"). Proper nouns, profanities, and certain offensive terms are also excluded.

The Harvard Crimson says that the game "appears simple but can get quite challenging very quickly. It can induce an intrinsically competitive nature in the player as they try to complete the task in as few words as possible." Another US college newspaper notes that Letter Boxed can be "frustrating" due the inclusion of words such as "azurite and erythrocyte".

A new game is published daily at 3:00 a.m. EST. Each daily update includes a menu item "Yesterday" which reveals a two word solution for the previous day's puzzle.

== See also ==
- The New York Times Games – Casual games by The New York Times
