= Jeff Chen =

American crossword constructor and writer (born 1972)

- Born: Jeffrey Chen; 1972 (age 53–54)
- Education: Stanford University (BS, MS); University of Washington (MBA)
- Occupations: Crossword constructor; writer
- Spouse: Jill Denny (m. 2012)
- Children: 2
- Website: www.jeffchenwrites.com

Jeffrey Chen (born 1972) is an American crossword puzzle constructor and writer. He has had more than 160 puzzles published in The New York Times, including a record over 120 collaborations (with over 60 unique collaborators). He has run the website XWord Info, a database of New York Times puzzles, since 2013.

== Early life and career ==
A native of the San Francisco Bay Area, Chen grew up solving logic puzzles in Games magazine. He is of Taiwanese descent. He majored in mechanical engineering at Stanford University, graduating in 1993 and receiving his Master of Science in 1994. After working in product design for several years, he received his Master of Business Administration from the University of Washington in 2002. He then joined UW ophthalmology professor Ryo Kubota to co-found the biotechnology company Acucela Inc., where he ran business operations until 2008. He later worked in finance. He also began writing middle grade fiction, publishing his first novel in the Ultraball series in 2019. He launched the web game Squeezy in 2024.

== Crossword constructing and XWord Info ==
Chen's future wife introduced him to crossword puzzles in the late 2000s. He was inspired to start constructing after watching the documentary Wordplay. He had his first puzzle published by the Los Angeles Times in July 2009. Though his first 26 submissions to Will Shortz were rejected, nearly two years after his first attempt, he had his first New York Times crossword published in July 2010, a collaboration with his wife. He came to be known for his mentorship of new constructors. He has had more than 160 puzzles published in The New York Times, including a record over 120 collaborations with over 60 unique collaborators. He has also constructed for outlets such as Crosswords with Friends, The Wall Street Journal, and the American Crossword Puzzle Tournament, where he made the difficult puzzle five in 2015. He made the 50×50 Super Mega crossword for The New York Times's Puzzle Mania issue in 2021.

XWord Info
- Available in: English
- Creator: Jim Horne
- Editor: Jeff Chen
- Website: www.xwordinfo.com
- Launched: 2007; 19 years ago
- Current status: Online

XWord Info, a comprehensive database of New York Times crosswords, was founded by Jim Horne in 2007. A popular resource for crossword constructors, the website has been maintained by Chen since 2013. Chen wrote reviews for every puzzle daily for ten years.

== Personal life ==
Chen married his wife, Jill Denny, in 2012. They live in Seattle and have two children. They have collaborated on five New York Times crosswords.

== Bibliography ==
- Chen, Jeff (2013). Bridge Crosswords. Master Point Press. ISBN 9781554947706.
- —— (January 15, 2019). Ultraball #1: Lunar Blitz. HarperCollins. ISBN 9780062802682.
- —— (January 14, 2020). Ultraball #2: Deathstrike. HarperCollins. ISBN 9780062802699.
- Chen, Jeff; Peterson, Doug (April 13, 2021). It's So Easy Crosswords. Puzzlewright Press. ISBN 9781454934257.
- Chen, Jeff (November 1, 2021). Bridge Crosswords 2. Master Point Press. ISBN 9781771400664.
- —— (March 8, 2022). The Best Puzzle Book for Adults. Callisto Publishing. ISBN 9781638071181.
- Gibbs, Stuart; Chen, Jeff (September 24, 2024). Spy School Entrance Exam. Simon & Schuster Books for Young Readers. ISBN 9781665951364.
