= The New York Times Magazine =

American magazine supplement

- The magazine's June 8, 2008, cover
- Editor: Jake Silverstein
- Categories: Newspaper supplement
- Frequency: Weekly
- Circulation: 1,623,697 per week (as part of Sunday paper)
- Publisher: A. G. Sulzberger
- First issue: September 6, 1896; 130 years ago
- Company: The New York Times Company
- Country: United States
- Language: English
- Website: nytimes.com/magazine
- ISSN: 0028-7822

The New York Times Magazine is an American Sunday magazine included with the Sunday edition of The New York Times. It features articles longer than those typically in the newspaper and has attracted many notable contributors. The magazine is noted for its photography, especially relating to fashion and style.

== History ==
=== 19th century ===
Its first issue was published on September 6, 1896, and contained the first photographs ever printed in the newspaper. In the early decades, it was a section of the broadsheet paper and not an insert as it is today. The creation of a "serious" Sunday magazine was part of a massive overhaul of the newspaper instigated that year by its new owner, Adolph Ochs, who also banned fiction, comic strips, and gossip columns from the paper, and is generally credited with saving The New York Times from financial ruin.

In 1897, the magazine published a 16-page spread of photographs documenting Queen Victoria's Diamond Jubilee, a "costly feat" that resulted in a wildly popular issue and helped boost the magazine to success.

=== 20th century ===
In its early years, The New York Times Magazine began a tradition of publishing the writing of well-known contributors, from W. E. B. Du Bois and Albert Einstein to numerous sitting and future U.S. presidents. Editor Lester Markel, an "intense and autocratic" journalist who oversaw the Sunday Times from the 1920s through the 1950s, encouraged the idea of the magazine as a forum for ideas. During his tenure, writers such as Leo Tolstoy, Thomas Mann, Gertrude Stein, and Tennessee Williams contributed pieces to the magazine. When, in 1970, The New York Times introduced its first op-ed page, the magazine shifted away from publishing as many editorial pieces.

In 1979, the magazine began publishing Pulitzer Prize–winning journalist William Safire's "On Language", a column discussing issues of English grammar, use and etymology. Safire's column steadily gained popularity and by 1990 was generating "more mail than anything else" in the magazine. In 1999, the magazine debuted "The Ethicist", an advice column written by humorist Randy Cohen that quickly became a highly contentious part of the magazine.

=== 21st century ===
In 2004, The New York Times Magazine began publishing an entire supplement devoted to style. Titled T, the supplement is edited by Deborah Needleman and appears 14 times a year. In 2009, it launched a Qatari Edition as a standalone magazine.

In 2006, the magazine introduced two other supplements: PLAY, a sports magazine published every other month, and KEY, a real estate magazine published twice a year.

In September 2010, as part of a greater effort to reinvigorate the magazine, Times editor Bill Keller hired former staff member and then-editor of Bloomberg Businessweek, Hugo Lindgren, as the editor of The New York Times Magazine.

As part of a series of new staff hires upon assuming his new role, Lindgren first hired then–executive editor of O, The Oprah Magazine Lauren Kern to be his deputy editor and then hired then-editor of TNR.com, The New Republic magazine's website, Greg Veis, to edit the "front of the book" section of the magazine. In December 2010, Lindgren hired Joel Lovell, formerly story editor at GQ magazine, as deputy editor.

In 2011, Kaminer replaced Cohen as the author of "The Ethicist", and in 2012 Chuck Klosterman replaced Kaminer. Klosterman left in early 2015 to be replaced by a trio of authors, Kenji Yoshino, Amy Bloom, and Jack Shafer, who used a conversational format; Shafer was replaced three months later by Kwame Anthony Appiah, who assumed sole authorship of the column in September 2015.

"Consumed", Rob Walker's regular column on consumer culture, debuted in 2004. The Sunday Magazine also features a puzzle page, edited by Will Shortz, that features a crossword puzzle with a larger grid than those featured in the Times during the week, along with other types of puzzles on a rotating basis (including diagramless crossword puzzles and anacrostics).

In January 2012, humorist John Hodgman, who hosts his comedy court show podcast Judge John Hodgman, began writing a regular column "Judge John Hodgman Rules" (formerly "Ask Judge John Hodgman") for "The One-Page Magazine".

In 2014, Jake Silverstein, who had been editor-in-chief at Texas Monthly, replaced Lindgren as editor of the Sunday magazine.

Beginning in 2024 a condensed, edited version of an in-depth weekly interview is published by the magazine in parallel with the podcast version of the interview. The podcast titled The Interview is hosted by David Marchese and Lulu Garcia-Navarro. Episodes typically last 40 to 50 minutes. Guests have included politicians, actors, influential experts, media figures and high-profile writers.

== Features ==
=== Poetry ===
U.S. Poet Laureate Natasha Trethewey selects and introduces poems weekly, including from poets Tomas Tranströmer, Carlos Pintado, and Gregory Pardlo.

=== Puzzles ===
==== Sunday crossword ====
The magazine features the Sunday version of the daily New York Times crossword puzzle. This larger Sunday crossword is an icon in American culture; it is typically intended to be as difficult as a Thursday puzzle. Typically, the standard daily crossword is 15 by 15 squares, while the Sunday crossword measures 21 by 21 squares. The puzzles are edited by Will Shortz, the host of the on-air puzzle segment of NPR's Weekend Edition Sunday, introduced as "the puzzlemaster".

==== Variety puzzles ====
The smaller puzzle, which would occupy the lower part of the page, could provide variety each Sunday. It could be topical, humorous, have rhymed definitions or story definitions or quiz definitions. The combination of these two would offer meat and dessert, and catch the fancy of all types of puzzlers.

— Margaret Farrar, the Times' eventual first crossword editor, in a December 18, 1941 memo during the paper's crosswords consideration.

In addition to the primary crossword, the Times publishes a second Sunday puzzle each week of varying types in The New York Times Magazine. Currently, every other week features a rotating selection, including an acrostic (long written by Emily Cox and Henry Rathvon); other kinds of crosswords (cryptic "British-style crosswords", puns and anagrams, spiral, diagramless, etc.); word puzzles of other formats (Split Decisions, Marching Bands, etc.); and, more rarely, other types (some authored by Shortz himself—the only puzzles he has created for the Times during his tenure as crossword editor).

As well as a second word puzzle on Sundays, the Times publishes a KenKen numbers puzzle (a variant of the popular sudoku logic puzzles) each day of the week. The variety page also includes three smaller puzzles: a Spelling Bee by Frank Longo (different from the one online), one of several word puzzle formats by Patrick Berry, and a series of Japanese-style logic puzzles by Wei-Hwa Huang and others. The Times also offers a monthly bonus crossword with a theme relating to the month.

==== Acrostic puzzles ====
The acrostic, in particular, has the longest history. The puzzle began publishing on May 9, 1943, authored by Elizabeth S. Kingsley, who is credited with inventing the puzzle type, and continued to write the Times acrostic until December 28, 1952. From then until August 13, 1967, it was written by Kingsley's former assistant, Doris Nash Wortman; then it was taken over by Thomas H. Middleton for a period of over 30 years, until August 15, 1999, when the pair of Cox and Rathvon became just the fourth author of the puzzle in its history. The name of the puzzle also changed over the years, from "Double-Crostic" to "Kingsley Double-Crostic", "Acrostic Puzzle", and, finally since 1991, just "Acrostic".

=== The Funny Pages ===
In the September 18, 2005, issue of the magazine, an editors' note announced the addition of The Funny Pages, a literary section of the magazine intended to "engage our readers in some ways we haven't yet tried—and to acknowledge that it takes many different types of writing to tell the story of our time". Although The Funny Pages is no longer published in the magazine, it was made up of three parts: the Strip (a multipart graphic novel that spanned weeks), the Sunday Serial (a genre fiction serial novel that also spanned weeks), and True-Life Tales (a humorous personal essay, by a different author each week). On July 8, 2007, the magazine stopped printing True-Life Tales.

The section has been criticized for being unfunny, sometimes nonsensical, and excessively highbrow; in a 2006 poll conducted by Gawker.com asking, "Do you now find—or have you ever found—The Funny Pages funny?", 92% of 1824 voters answered "No".

=== Strips ===
| Title | Artist | Start Date | End Date | # of Chapters |
|---|---|---|---|---|
| Building Stories | Chris Ware | September 18, 2005 | April 16, 2006 | 30 |
| La Maggie La Loca | Jaime Hernandez | April 23, 2006 | September 3, 2006 | 20 |
| George Sprott (1894-1975) | Seth | September 17, 2006 | March 25, 2007 | 25 |
| Watergate Sue | Megan Kelso | April 1, 2007 | September 9, 2007 | 24 |
| Mister Wonderful | Daniel Clowes | September 16, 2007 | February 10, 2008 | 20 |
| Low Moon | Jason | February 17, 2008 | June 22, 2008 | 17 |
| The Murder of the Terminal Patient | Rutu Modan | June 29, 2008 | November 2, 2008 | 17 |
| Prime Baby | Gene Yang | November 9, 2008 | April 5, 2009 | 18 |

=== Sunday serials ===
| Title | Author | Start Date | End Date | # of Chapters |
|---|---|---|---|---|
| Comfort to the Enemy | Elmore Leonard | September 18, 2005 | December 18, 2005 | 14 |
| At Risk | Patricia Cornwell | January 8, 2006 | April 16, 2006 | 15 |
| Limitations | Scott Turow | April 23, 2006 | August 6, 2006 | 16 |
| The Overlook | Michael Connelly | September 17, 2006 | January 21, 2007 | 16 |
| Gentlemen of the Road | Michael Chabon | January 28, 2007 | May 6, 2007 | 15 |
| Doors Open | Ian Rankin | May 13, 2007 | August 19, 2007 | 15 |
| The Dead and the Naked | Cathleen Schine | September 9, 2007 | January 6, 2008 | 16 |
| The Lemur | John Banville (as Benjamin Black) | January 13, 2008 | April 27, 2008 | 15 |
| Mrs. Corbett's Request | Colin Harrison | May 4, 2008 | August 17, 2008 | 15 |
| The Girl in the Green Raincoat | Laura Lippman | September 7, 2008 | | 1 (to date) |

Of the serial novels, At Risk, Limitations, The Overlook, Gentlemen of the Road, and The Lemur have since been published in book form with added material.
