= Veis =

Veis is a surname. Notable people with the surname include:

- Andrei Veis (born 1990), Estonian footballer
- Greg Veis, American magazine editor
- Jaroslav Veis (born 1946), Czech journalist and writer

== See also ==
- Voz Veis, Venezuelan musical group
