= Henry Hook =

Henry Hook may refer to:

- Henry Hook (VC) (1850–1905), British soldier who won the Victoria Cross at Rorke's Drift
- Henry Hook (crossword compiler) (1955–2015), American crossword compiler
