= The New York Times Strands =

Word game

Strands
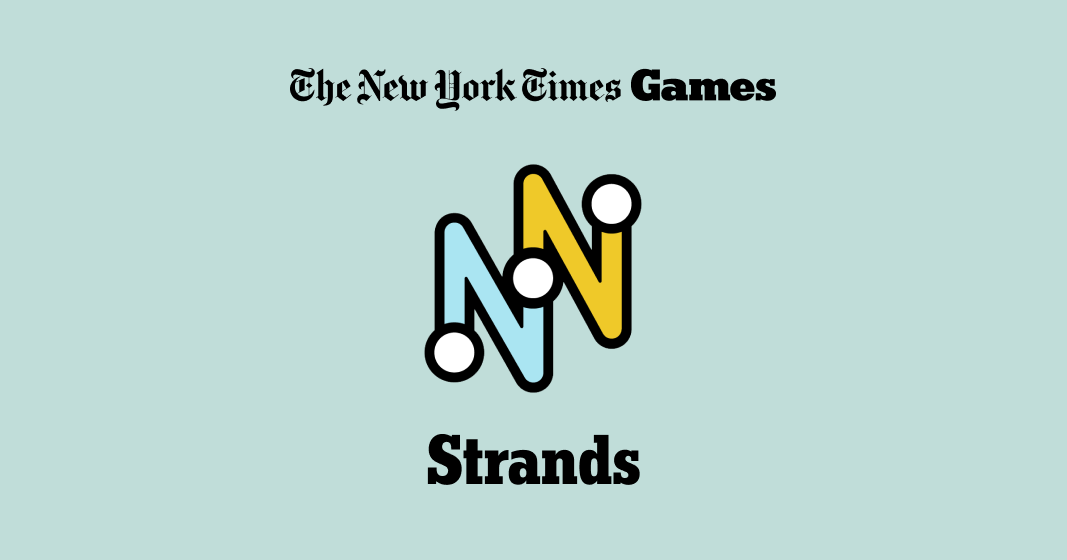
- Developer: The New York Times
- Publisher: The New York Times Games
- Writer: Tracy Bennett
- Platform: Web browsers
- Release: March 4, 2024 (beta)
- Genre: Word game
- Mode: Single-player

Strands is an online word game created by The New York Times. Released into beta in March 2024, Strands is a part of the New York Times Games library. Strands takes the form of a word search, with new puzzles released once every day. The original pitch for the game was created by Juliette Seive, and puzzles are edited by Tracy Bennett.

== Gameplay ==
Strands is a word search of letters arranged in a six-by-eight grid. Unlike typical word searches, words in Strands can bend in any direction. A new puzzle is released for Strands every day, similar to other games offered by The New York Times. Each puzzle is themed; players are given a clue to the theme of the puzzle, and the total number of words (which must have at least four letters) to be found. If the player finds three words unrelated to the puzzle, they have the option to receive a hint, which highlights the letters in one of the theme words. Each puzzle also contains a "spangram," a word or short phrase that describes the theme itself and spans two opposite edges of the grid (it can begin and/or end elsewhere, though). The spangram is highlighted in yellow when found, while theme words turn blue. Words other than the spangram may also touch two opposing edges. Words do not overlap, and every letter is used in exactly one word.

== Development ==
The New York Times Games research director Juliette Seive developed the pitch for what would later become Strands. She proposed the idea at The New York Times's annual game jam, and prototype of Strands was approved by a concept committee several weeks later. Vanity Fair reported in December 2023 that The New York Times was developing a word search game to add to their online library of games. Strands puzzles are edited by Tracy Bennett, who also edits Wordle for The New York Times. Strands released into beta on March 4, 2024, playable on web browsers through the New York Times Games website.

== Reception ==
Ian Bogost, writing for The Atlantic, lauded Strand's innovations to the word search genre. "Many of the best games succeed by offering a novel take on something familiar. Strands does exactly that," he described, adding that Strands "draws on a familiar format that everyone knows, and varies that format in a manner that is reminiscent of other games without being reliant on their mastery." Bogost also praised Strands for making "the player feel smarter than they really are," which he described as "the purpose of newspaper games." The Gamer's Eric Switzer praised Strands overall, but lamented the difficulty of some of its puzzles, saying he hopes that "if Strands sticks around, future puzzles aren’t this rage-inducing."
