= Anomie (disambiguation) =

Anomie is a lack of social norms that can result in fragmentation of an individual's ideal social identity.

Anomie may also refer to:

== Music ==
- Anomie Belle (born 1980), American musician and artivist
- Anomie (Fairmont album), second studio album by indie rock band Fairmont
- Anomie (Stephen Simmonds album), fourth album by Swedish singer Stephen Simmonds
- Anomie (Tim Sköld album), second studio album by Swedish rock artist Tim Sköld

== Film ==
- Anomie (film), a 2026 Indian Malayalam language crime thriller film

== Other uses ==
- Institutional Anomie Theory, a derivation of strain theory

== See also ==
- Anomia (disambiguation)
- Anome
