= Fazan (game) =

Fazan (often stylized as FAZAN) is a Romanian mental skill word game for two or more players.

== Description ==
At the start of the game, the first player audibly says "A!" and goes through the entire alphabet in their head, starting over if needed. The second player interrupts after a while and the first player announces the letter they had gotten to at that moment. The second player then must say a word starting with that letter. Some rule sets imply that the player has 5 seconds to find a word.

The game continues with each player naming a word starting with the last two letters of the word said by the previous player. (For example if a player says "ananas", the next player has to find a word starting with "as", such as "aspirină"). When a player can no longer find such a word, he is trapped. Every time a player is trapped he gets assigned a letter from the word "fazan". For example, after getting trapped once he "is F", if he gets trapped twice he "is FA" and so on until he gets trapped five times, resulting in him being out of the game. The game continues until all players but one are out.

== Players ==
Although it can be played with any number of players, Fazan is mostly played in two. Due to it requiring a good knowledge of vocabulary, it's often played with preschoolers to improve their language skills, often being considered a typical childhood game. However, because it's a relatively simple game and because it can be played without pen and paper, it's spread to the wider population as a game to lighten up the mood on a lengthy trip.

== Rules ==
There isn't an official rule set for Fazan. Most of the times, the players agree on their own house rules regarding what words are valid. More often than not proper nouns, inflected forms of words, onomatopoeias and conjugated verbs are not allowed, the form of words as they appear in dictionaries is exclusively allowed. Repeating a word already used to trap someone, either by one's self or by another player is also often forbidden. Words consisting of only two letters are also forbidden, being considered too short.

Trapping a player in the first cycle of players saying words is often forbidden.

Some versions of the game ignore diacritics, for example letting you equate "lă" with "la".

== The goal ==
The immediate goal of the game is trapping other players. So, seeking a trap word, as in a word that doesn't allow the other player to continue, is a large part of the game's strategy. You can trap the next player directly or help the next player by playing a word that allows them to trap the next player.

== Ntur ==
The most common termination of a trap word is "nt". Recently the word "ntur" has gotten popular for presumably letting you continue the game after being trapped with "nt". The word appeared in the Dictionary of archaisms and regionalisms written by Gh. Bulgăr, the Gh. Constantinescu-Dobridor and also appears in the second edition of "the Little Academical Dictionary" published by the Institute of Linguistics of the Romanian Academy. The word often ranks on the top of the most searched words on Dexonline, an open Romanian dictionary platform. Some allow it in their games while some consider it invalid.
