= Julia R. Masterman School =

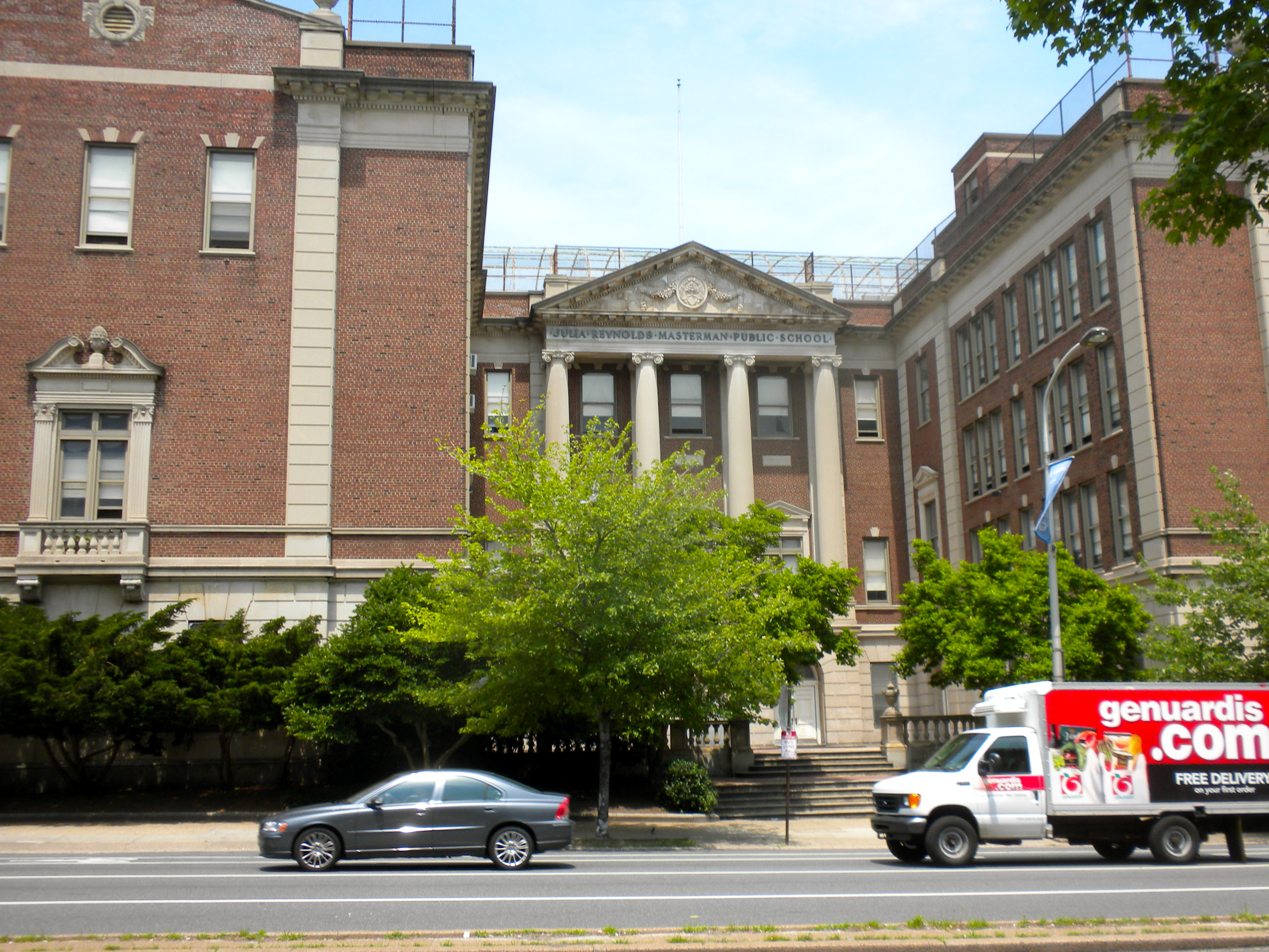
- Julia R. Masterman School in Philadelphia

Location
- 1699 Spring Garden St. Philadelphia, Pennsylvania, U.S. 19130; 39°57′49″N 75°09′57″W

Information
- Type: Special admission
- Motto: "Dare to be excellent"
- Opened: 1958
- Principal: Gordon Laurie
- Staff: 54.81 (FTE)
- Grades: 5-12
- Enrollment: 1,197 (2017–18)
- Student to teacher ratio: 21.84
- Campus type: Urban (One building)
- Colors: Blue and white
- Team name: Blue Dragons
- Newspaper: Voices
- Website: https://masterman.philasd.org
- Philadelphia High School for Girls (former campus)
- U.S. National Register of Historic Places
- Location within Philadelphia Location within Pennsylvania Location within the United States
- Built: 1933
- Architect: Irwin T. Catharine
- Architectural style: Classical Revival
- MPS: Philadelphia Public Schools TR
- NRHP reference No.: 86003302
- Added to NRHP: December 4, 1986

The Julia Reynolds Masterman Laboratory and Demonstration School is a middle and secondary school located in Philadelphia. It is a magnet school, ranked the 3rd best high school in the nation, located in the Spring Garden neighborhood. Prior to 1958, the school building was used by the Philadelphia High School for Girls and the building was placed on the National Register of Historic Places under that name in 1986.

== Rankings and awards ==
Masterman is ranked first in the School District of Philadelphia and in the state of Pennsylvania. It is considered one of the best college-preparatory public schools in the country. The school has twice been named a National Blue Ribbon School of Excellence. U.S. News & World Report ranked it as the top public school in Pennsylvania since 1996, and 3rd in the nation in 2026.

== History ==
The Julia R. Masterman Laboratory and Demonstration School was established in September 1958 as an academic magnet school for elementary school students in grades 4, 5 and 6. A junior high school program was initiated in 1959, and a senior high school was added in 1976. In 1990 Masterman was re-organized as a middle school (grades 5-8) and a high school (grades 9-12). Masterman is located in the former Philadelphia High School for Girls building.

Students are admitted from all areas of Philadelphia based on academic performance, and staff members are selected based on professional expertise. The high school is a preparatory school for select students of superior ability.

The school was named for Julia Reynolds Masterman, who was instrumental in establishing the Philadelphia Home and School Council and served as its first president. The Masterman family still participates in school events and contributes awards at commencement.

In 2006 the district considered establishing an annex for 5th and 6th grade students to increase the school's capacity. The proposed site was Stoddard-Fleischer Middle School.

In 2007, Masterman was a filming location for the 2008 M. Night Shyamalan film The Happening starring Mark Wahlberg. The film shows interior shots of a science lab on the fourth floor, the auditorium, and the main corridor of the first floor hallway, along with various other shots of the school.

In 2010, President Barack Obama chose Masterman as the site of his second annual back-to-school speech, which was broadcast nationally. There, he spoke about how the core of America's future is represented by the students of this generation.

President Obama giving his back to school speech at Masterman.

Jeannine Payne, who attended Masterman for middle school, was named principal in 2021.

Gordon Laurie, previously a principal in the Arlington Public School District, was named principal in 2024.

== Dress code ==
The current dress code states that students must wear clothing which is appropriate, acceptable and not offensive in any way. Jeans are allowed, but cannot be ripped in inappropriate places. References to alcohol, illegal drugs, profanities, or slurs of any sort are not permitted on any personal property.

Beginning in 2001 the School District of Philadelphia required all schools to enact school uniforms or strict dress codes. To comply with the district-wide policy, the Masterman administration banned shirts with logos and emblems.

== Notable alumni ==
- Kevin Bacon, actor and musician
- Ingrid Croce (nee Jacobson), singer-songwriter and restaurateur
- Joel Fagliano, crossword puzzle maker
- Ellen Forney, author, graphic artist
- Kenneth Frazier, chairman and chief executive officer, Merck & Co.
- Andrea Gardner, former WNBA basketball player
- Stephanie Gatschet, actress
- Germaine Ingram, lawyer, professor and dancer
- Leila Josefowicz, concert violinist
- Shana Knizhnik, author and lawyer
- Emtithal Mahmoud, poet
- Angela Nissel, writer
- Leslie Odom Jr., actor and singer
- Mia Roberts Perez, federal judge.
- Chynna Rogers, rapper and model
- Gregory Shahade, chess player and poker professional
- Jennifer Shahade, chess player
- Julie Slick, musician
- Eric Slick, musician
- Will Smith, musician and actor — seventh grade
- Raymond Teller, magician and writer
