= The New York Times Crosswords (video game) =

2007 video game

- The New York Times Crosswords North American box art
- Developer: Budcat Creations
- Publisher: Majesco
- Platform: Nintendo DS
- Release: NA: May 22, 2007; EU: September 21, 2007; AU: October 8, 2007
- Genre: Puzzle
- Modes: Single-player, wireless up to 4 players

The New York Times Crosswords is a video game released on May 22, 2007, for the Nintendo DS.

== Gameplay ==
Players use the stylus to write the letters using handwriting recognition, with keyboard optional. There are 1,000 puzzles with increasing levels of difficulty over the days of the week, just like the crosswords published in The New York Times (Mondays are easiest, Saturdays are hardest, and Sundays are significantly larger, but only the difficulty of a Thursday). Wireless allows up to 4 players to compete or work as a team to complete puzzles.

== Reception ==
The New York Times Crosswords received "generally favorable" reviews from critics, according to the review aggregation website Metacritic. Nintendo World Report rated the game a 9.0.
