= The New York Times Spelling Bee =

Word game

- Developers: Frank Longo, The New York Times Company
- Publisher: The New York Times Games
- Platforms: Browser, Mobile app
- Release: February 22, 2015 (print); May 9, 2018 (browser)
- Genre: Word game
- Mode: Single-player

The New York Times Spelling Bee, or simply Spelling Bee, is a word game distributed in print and electronic format by The New York Times as part of The New York Times Games. Created by Frank Longo, the game debuted in a weekly print format on February 22, 2015. A digital daily version with an altered scoring system launched on May 9, 2018.

== Gameplay ==
A partially completed version of the August 8, 2021 puzzle. The sole pangram of this puzzle was "inflect".

The game presents players with a hexagonal grid of 7 letters arrayed in a honeycomb structure. The player scores points by using the letters to form words consisting of four or more letters. However, any words proposed by the player must include the letter at the center of the honeycomb. Each letter can be used more than once. Each qualifying word scores one point per letter, except for four letter words, which only score 1 point each. Scoring points leads to progressively higher praise for the player's effort, such as "Solid", "Amazing", and "Genius". Each puzzle is guaranteed to have at least one pangram, a word containing at least one of each of the seven letters. Pangrams award 7 extra points (e.g. a seven-letter pangram scores 14 points). If the player finds all of the possible words in a given puzzle, they achieve the title of "Queen Bee".

In 2021, the editor Sam Ezersky stated his intention to never include the letter S in a puzzle. He said this inclusion would make the game too simple to win by adding plurals. An exception was made on March 12, 2025, when the letter S was included to celebrate the 2,500th edition of the Spelling Bee. The letter S was included also on September 2, 2025 and May 29, 2026.

== Creation ==
Spelling Bee was created by Frank Longo following a proposal from Will Shortz, who was inspired by “a popular feature in British newspapers”, namely the puzzle game Polygon from The Times. The game launched in its print format in 2015 as a weekly feature in The New York Times Magazine. The game's digital version debuted on May 9, 2018 with Sam Ezersky as the new editor. The cartoon bee mascot, Beeatrice, was designed by Robert Vinluan for the digital version. The game goes live at 3 A.M. Eastern Time every day.

== Reception ==
Since its online debut in 2018, Spelling Bee's popularity has grown and the game has received praise from other game makers in the media industry. Pat Myers of The Washington Post wrote that, despite being a lifelong promoter of The Washington Post, she found herself in "the thrall of the New York Times Spelling Bee game". Nilanjana Roy of the Financial Times praised the game as one of the best ways to pass the time and connect with friends during the COVID-19 pandemic lockdowns. Jim Memmot of the Rochester Democrat and Chronicle similarly praised the game as a pleasant pastime during the COVID-19 pandemic.

In addition to its reception among critics, the game has also spawned a significant following on social media, with players posting their scores and discussing each day's word selections on Twitter. Several online tools have been created to provide daily hints and analysis of the puzzle, among them one by science fiction author William Shunn was mentioned in The New York Times itself.

== Influence ==
The same concept was adapted to the Catalan language by a non-profit in November 2021. The website, called Paraulògic, went viral in Catalonia a month after its launch.
