= Anagram dictionary =

Dictionary containing anagram words

In the main type of anagram dictionary, the letters in words or phrases are rearranged in alphabetical order, and these transpositions are themselves then ordered alphabetically within word-length groups so that any words consisting of this group of letters can be found. This arrangement is designed for use in solving word puzzles such as crosswords or for playing games such as Scrabble. The first such anagram dictionary was The Crossword Anagram Dictionary by R.J. Edwards

In the other kind of anagram dictionary, words are categorized into equivalence classes that consist of words with the same number of each kind of letter. Thus, words will only appear when other words can be made from the same letters.

Anagram dictionaries were formerly produced by hand but can now be trivially generated from any machine-readable word list by computer by sorting words in order of their sorted letter strings.
