= Henry Hook (crossword constructor) =

American creator of crossword puzzles

- Hook at the 2014 American Crossword Puzzle Tournament
- Born: September 18, 1955; East Rutherford, New Jersey, U.S.
- Died: October 27, 2015 (aged 60)
- Known for: Crossword puzzles
- Spouse: Stephanie Abrams (m. 1985; died 1988)

Henry Hook (September 18, 1955 – October 27, 2015) was an American creator of crossword puzzles, widely credited with popularizing the cryptic crossword in North America. With Henry Rathvon and Emily Cox, he wrote the crossword for the Boston Globe.

Hook began constructing crosswords at age 14, when he sent a rebuttal crossword to Eugene T. Maleska. Maleska's crossword contained the hidden message:

You Have Just Finished The World's Most Remarkable Crossword

Hook's crossword contained the hidden message:

What Makes You Think Your Puzzle Is More Remarkable Than Mine

Maleska subsequently became Hook's mentor.

In 1980, Hook joined the staff of Games. In the mid-1980s, he collaborated with novelists Patricia Moyes and Herbert Resnicow to create crosswords for crossword-themed mystery novels. In 1990, CROSSW RD ranked his Hooked on Puzzles #3 the best book of the year; Hook subsequently recused himself from future awards.

Stanley Newman has described one of Hook's puzzles as "one of the toughest crosswords (Newman) has ever published". Matt Gaffney, the crossword constructor for Slate.com, described meeting Hook as being like "meeting Elvis", while Will Shortz called him "ingenious, (and) a truly brilliant puzzlemaker." Crossword editor and historian Ben Tausig, in his 2013 The Curious History of the Crossword, described Hook as "an under-recognized, polarizing genius with a sometimes tense relationship with audiences."

Hook died on October 27, 2015, after a long illness.
