= Sam Ezersky =

American puzzle editor (born 1995)

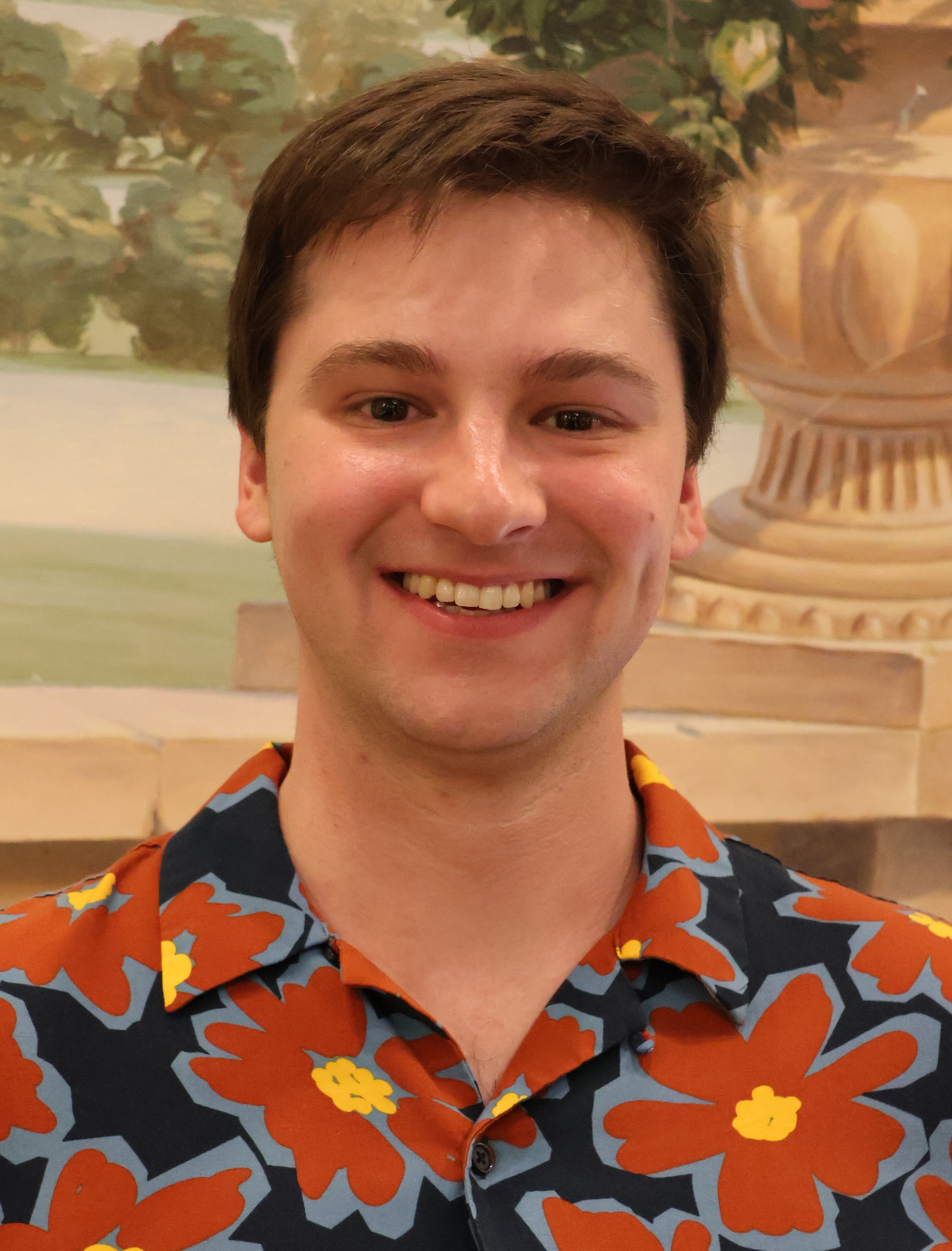
- Ezersky at the 2024 American Crossword Puzzle Tournament
- Born: May 29, 1995 (age 31); Pikesville, Maryland, U.S.
- Education: University of Virginia
- Occupations: Puzzle editor; crossword constructor
- Years active: 2012–present
- Known for: Editor of The New York Times Spelling Bee

Sam Ezersky (born May 29, 1995) is an American puzzle editor and crossword constructor who is the editor of The New York Times Spelling Bee. He has worked for the New York Times games department since 2017.

== Early life and education ==
Ezersky was born in Pikesville, Maryland, outside of Baltimore. He became interested in puzzles at a young age, solving his first Fill-In puzzle when he was only five or six. He began constructing crossword puzzles and submitting them to newspapers by age 14. When he was 16, he published his first crossword, which ran in the Los Angeles Times on March 25, 2012, and when he was 17, his first New York Times puzzle, a collaboration with Vic Fleming, appeared on July 28, 2012.

Ezersky graduated in 2017 from the University of Virginia, where he double-majored in mechanical engineering and economics—and, for two years, wrote a weekly crossword puzzle for the Cavalier Daily. In 2016, when New York Times crossword editor Will Shortz was in town for a commencement speech, Ezersky, then still in college, had him over to his house to talk puzzles. Ezersky kept in touch afterwards and interned for Shortz that winter.

== Career ==
Ezersky was hired right out of college, in 2017, as an assistant puzzle editor for The New York Times, where he helps review and edit crossword submissions to the newspaper. As of April 2025, he has also published 59 of his own crosswords, including collaborations and variety grids, in the Times.

Ezersky became the editor of the Times's daily online Spelling Bee game at its launch in 2018. The game has amassed an online following known as the Hivemind, which constantly reacts to Ezersky's decisions to include or exclude words from the game.

Ezersky also edits the newspaper's Letter Boxed game, which debuted in 2019.
