= Anomia =

Anomia may refer to:

- Anomic aphasia, a type of aphasia
- Anomia (bivalve), a genus of bivalve
- Anomia (game), 2009 party game designed by Andrew Innes

== See also ==
- Ammonia
- Anomie
- Anosmia
