= Tracy Bennett =

American puzzle editor

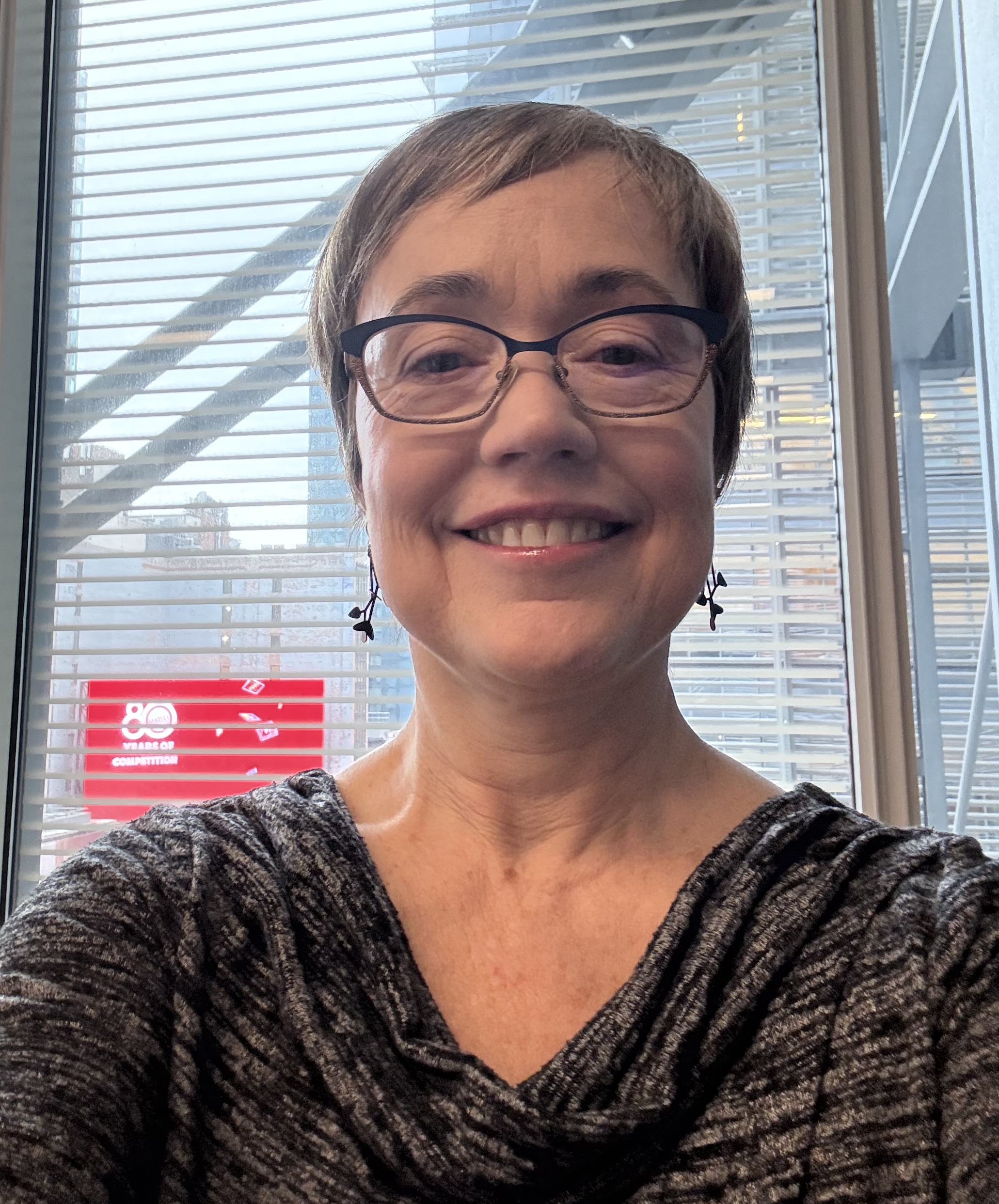
- Bennett in 2025
- Born: Tracy Pinkham; Maine
- Occupation: Puzzle editor
- Known for: Editing Wordle

Tracy Bennett (née Pinkham) is an editor and puzzle editor. She edits The New York Times Games products Wordle and Strands.

== Early life ==
Bennett was born Tracy Pinkham and grew up in Maine. Her parents were both in the Navy when her older sister, Cinda, was born, and later divorced. She and her sister attended free schools.

According to her family, Bennett began solving jigsaw puzzles before she could talk. She had an early interest in crossword puzzles. She attended the University of Southern Maine as a theater major, then transferred to the University of Michigan and changed her major to English literature, graduating in 1989.

== Career ==
Bennett worked for thirty years for Mathematical Reviews, first as a copy editor and then as the copy editing department manager.

In 2010 she won a crossword puzzle contest at The Ann Arbor News and soon became interested in puzzle construction after attending the American Crossword Puzzle Tournament. Her first commissioned crossword puzzle was published by Knitty. She sold several puzzles in 2013, including her first to The New York Times. In 2017 she cofounded a website offering crossword puzzles created by women and nonbinary people and began editing crosswords.

Bennett became an associate puzzle editor for The New York Times in 2020. In 2022 she became the paper's Wordle editor. She also edits the paper's crossword puzzles and creates and edits crosswords for other publications. As of April 2025, she has created 7 total crosswords for New York Times, one being a variety puzzle, and one being a puzzle made in collaboration with Victor Schmitt. Her debut puzzle for the Times was published on July 21, 2013, and her latest puzzle was published on April 20, 2025.

She made adjustments to Wordle, which was a new acquisition by the Times from its creator. She reorganizes a set of randomly-chosen words for lexical variety and level-of-difficulty throughout a week's puzzles. On one occasion, she experimented with a themed entry on Thanksgiving Day. She considers the implications of words related to current news and researches possible offensive alternative uses of words. She has received pushback from players about themed entries.

Bennett began editing Strands, a themed word search game, when the Times launched it in March 2024.

== Personal life ==
Bennett lives in Ann Arbor, Michigan, where she works from home. In 2002 she married George Bennett, with whom she has a son. George Bennett died in 2021.
