= Anomia (game) =

Party game about words

- Designers: Andrew Innes
- Genres: Card game; Party game; Word game
- Players: 3–6
- Playing time: 20–30 minutes
- Age range: 10+
- Website: https://www.anomiapress.com

Anomia is a card-based party game designed by Andrew Innes and first published by Anomia Press in 2009. It is a fast-paced game where players flip cards until the symbols on two players’ cards match. Matching players then race to give an example of the category on their opponent’s card. Following its release, multiple editions have been published, including Anomia Party Edition, Anomia X, Anomia Kids, Anomia 2.0 (UK), and Anomia Pop Culture. It has been published in 15 languages and is available in more than 20 countries.

== History ==
=== Design ===
Anomia was designed by Andrew Innes, who based the gameplay on the card game Store, wherein players take on the identities of different types of stores and draw from a deck of playing cards; if two players draw a card of the same suit, then they quickly attempt to name something that can be purchased in their opponent's store. Innes found that having only one category was limiting and thought that the game could be expanded to accommodate a wider variety of topics.

In 2005, Innes made a prototype of a card game with an expanded set of categories, which he play-tested with more than 200 people over the course of four years. Innes first picked the name "Common Knowledge," but it was already trademarked as a game. He eventually chose the name "Anomia" a word meaning "without a name" or "the inability to recall a word".

=== Publication ===
In May 2009, Innes started his game publishing company, Anomia Press, and raised money for the first printing by asking friends, family, acquaintances to pre-purchase copies of the game. The game was officially published later that year. Anomia Press released multiple expansions of Anomia, including Anomia Party Edition in 2013, Anomia X and Anomia Kids in 2017, Anomia 2.0 in 2021, and Anomia Pop Culture in 2022, each of which added new categories to the game.

== Gameplay ==
Anomia is played with a deck of cards, each with one of eight symbols and a topic, which is placed face down in the middle of the playing area, serving as a draw pile. Each player has a play pile and winning pile in front of them. Players take turns flipping the top card from the draw pile on to their play pile until two players have a card with the same symbol. The matching players race to give an example of the topic on their opponent’s card. The player with the faster response removes the top card from their opponent’s play pile, revealing a new top card, and places it in their winning pile. If the new top card matches the top card in another player's play pile, the matching players again race to give an example of the topic on their opponent's card. This continues until there are no more matches, and then players continue to flip cards from the draw pile. If a wild card with two symbols is flipped, the card is placed next to the draw pile and those two symbols are considered to match until another wild card is flipped and replaces it. The game ends when the deck runs out, and the winner is the player with the most cards in their winning pile.

== Reception ==
Wirecutter included Anomia in their list of the "11 Best Board Games [as of] 2023", with James Austin describing the game as "a fantastic time of chaotic yelling" and praising it for its fast pace and replayability. Writing for Polygon, Clayton Ashley wrote that "Anomia challenges your ability to think fast" and praised the game for its simple rules. In a brief review for Global News, Jim Joy described the game as "a fun and easy-to-play game that tests your common knowledge against other players," concluding that "it’s a wonderful family-friendly game to play any night of the week." An article for Slate, written by Noel Murray, compared the game to Scattegories because of its fast paced party game design.

=== Awards ===
In 2010, Anomia was the winner of the Mensa Select Game of the Year award and the American Specialty Toy Retailing Association Best Toy For Kids award. This resulted in placement in over 300 stores throughout the United States and over 20,000 units sold that year. In 2011, the game was given a "Seal of Approval" from the National Parenting Center. Anomia was the winner of the UK Games Expo's Best Party Game award in 2014.

Two editions have won the National Parenting Product Award: Anomia Party Edition in 2016 and Anomia Kids in 2018. Later in 2018, Anomia Kids was also the winner of the Parents’ Choice Award.
