= Joel Fagliano =

American puzzle creator (born 1992)

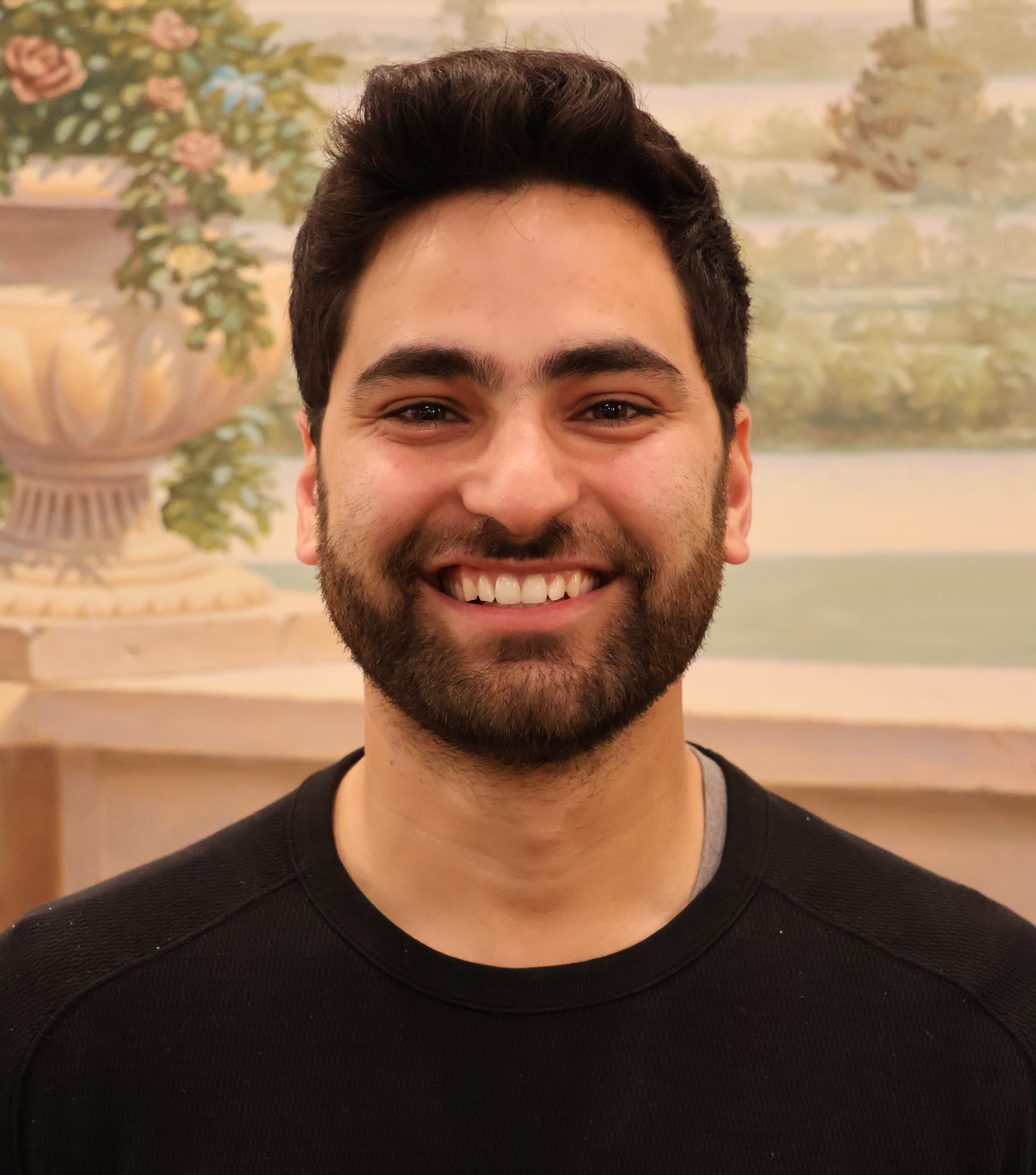
- Fagliano at the 2024 American Crossword Puzzle Tournament
- Born: 1992 (age 33–34)
- Education: Pomona College
- Occupations: Puzzle creator; puzzle editor
- Known for: The New York Times mini crossword puzzle

Joel Fagliano (born 1992) is an American puzzle creator. He is known for his work at The New York Times, where he writes the paper's Mini Crossword. From March 14 to December 29, 2024, Fagliano served as the interim editor of The New York Times Crossword while editor Will Shortz was on medical leave.

== Early life and education ==
Fagliano grew up in the Mount Airy neighborhood of Philadelphia, Pennsylvania, in a Jewish family with two brothers. His mother is a grant writer and his father is a chairperson at the Drexel University School of Public Health. He enjoyed puzzles as a child, began completing the New York Times crossword puzzle regularly during his freshman year of high school at the Masterman School, a magnet school, and began making his own crosswords in his sophomore year. Fagliano also played plenty of chess in high school; he found that the skills he learned in chess were unexpectedly useful when designing crosswords. For college, he moved to Southern California to attend Pomona College, where he graduated in 2014 with a degree in linguistics and cognitive science.

== Career ==
Fagliano started submitting standard-length crossword puzzles to the New York Times in 2007. His first puzzle was accepted in September 2009 and ran the next month, when he was 17 years old. By the time he finished high school, he had had four puzzles accepted and published by the Times and two accepted and published by the Los Angeles Times Syndicate. He interned for three summers with Will Shortz, the Times' crossword puzzle editor. After graduating from Pomona College in 2014, Fagliano began working for him full-time. At the Times, Fagliano creates and edits the "Mini Crossword", a 5 × 5 (or sometimes slightly larger, often on Saturdays) puzzle released daily, originally envisioned by product director Matt Hural.

== Personal life ==
Fagliano lives on the Upper East Side of Manhattan, New York City. His hobbies include playing chess and basketball, watching sports, and jogging.
