= Greg Veis =

American magazine editor

Greg Veis is an American magazine editor. Veis is currently the Executive Editor at Highline from Huffington Post. Previously he was an executive editor at The New Republic magazine.

On June 14, 2012, "Huffington Post" reported that Veis was moving to The New Republic as executive editor.

On October 22, 2010, New York Magazine reported that Veis will join the New York Times Magazine as the "front of the book" editor.

Before joining TNR, Veis was an editor at GQ magazine. His writing has appeared in the Esquire, Rolling Stone, Men's Journal, Mother Jones, The New York Observer, The New Republic, and GQ.
