= Acrostic (puzzle) =

Word puzzle

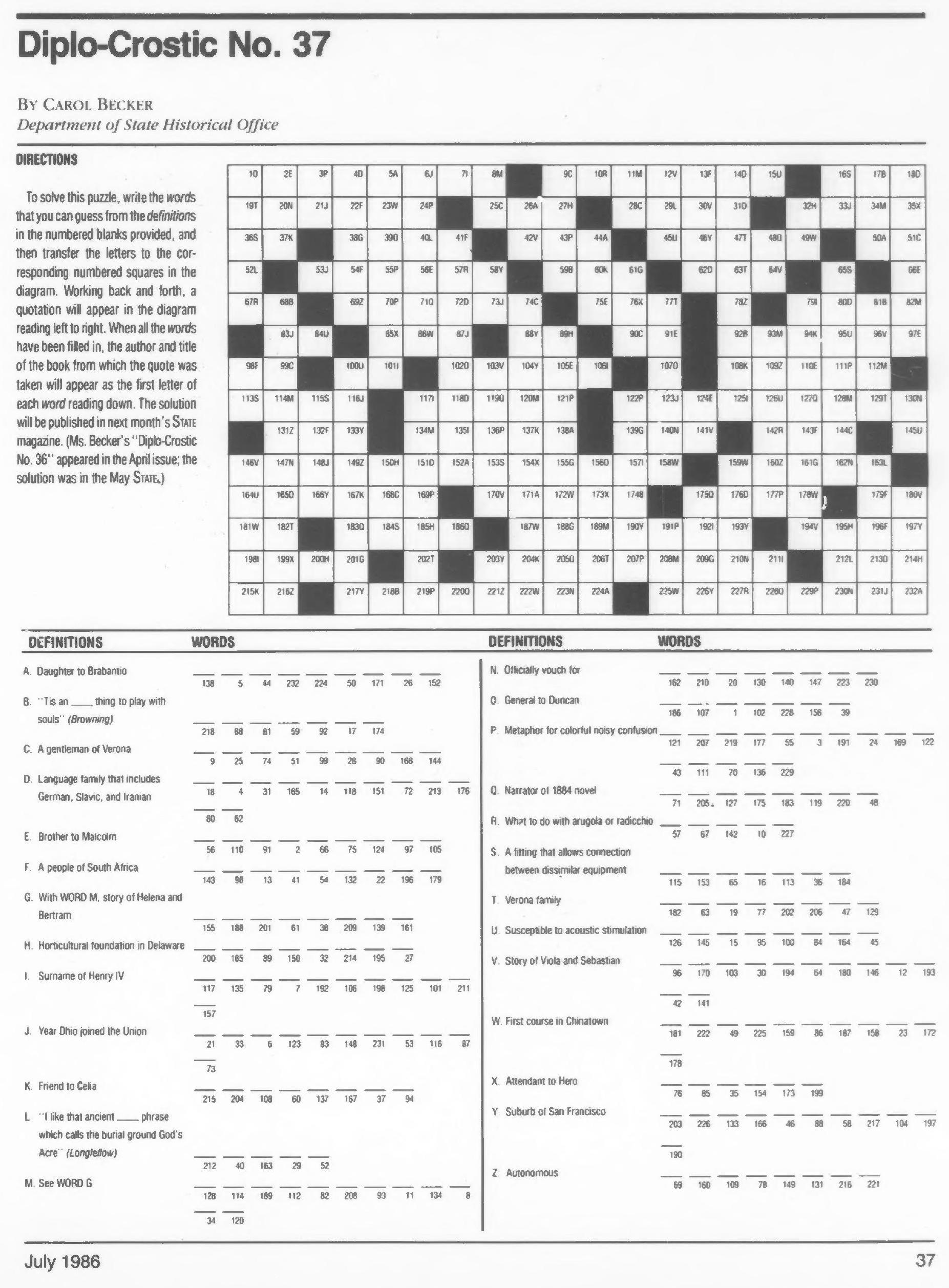
An acrostic puzzle published in State Magazine in 1986

An acrostic is a type of word puzzle, related somewhat to crossword puzzles, that uses an acrostic form. It typically consists of two parts. The first part is a set of lettered clues, each of which has numbered blanks representing the letters of the answer. The second part is a long series of numbered blanks and spaces, representing a quotation or other text, into which the answers for the clues fit. In some forms of the puzzle, the first letters of each correct clue answer, read in order from clue A on down the list, will spell out the author of the quote and the title of the work it is taken from; this can be used as an additional solving aid.

== An example ==
For example, two clues in the first part might be:

A. Country of the Rising Sun:	_	_	_	_	_
	8	5	17	2	14
B. Not doing anything:	_	_	_	_
	9	7	23	20

The second part is initially blank:

_	_	_	_	_	_	_	_	_	_	_	_	_	_	_	_	_	_	_	_	_	_	_	_
1	2	3	4	5	6	7	8	9	10	11	12	13	14	15	16	17	18	19	20	21	22	23	24

If the answer to clue A is JAPAN, then the second part fills in as follows:

_	A	_	_	A	_	_	J	_	_	_	_	_	N	_	_	P	_	_	_	_	_	_	_
1	2	3	4	5	6	7	8	9	10	11	12	13	14	15	16	17	18	19	20	21	22	23	24

Letters 16 and 17 form a two-letter word ending in P. Since this has to be UP, letter 16 is a U, which can be filled into the appropriate clue answer in the list of clues. Likewise, a three-letter word starting with A could be and, any, all, or even a proper name like Ann. One might need more clue answers before daring to guess which it could be.

If the answer to clue B is IDLE, one could narrow down the 5/6/7 word to AND and the following word starting with JI. Some people might already begin to recognize the phrase "Jack and Jill went up the hill."

The numbers in the quotation are generally followed by letters corresponding to the clue answers, to aid solvers in working back and forth from the clues to the puzzle.

== History ==
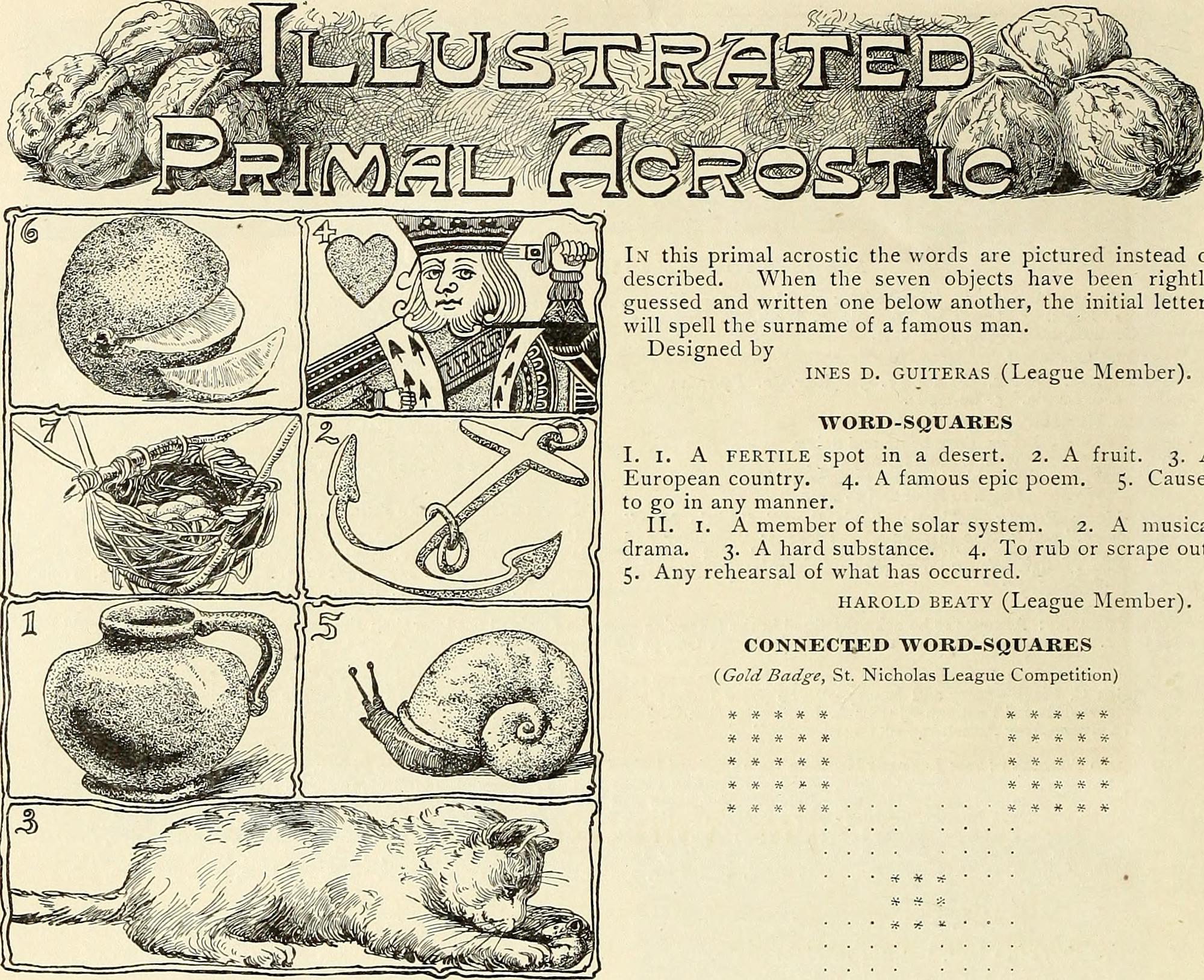
In this primal acrostic the words are pictured instead of described. When the seven objects have been rightly guessed and written one below another, the initial letters will spell the surname of a famous man. (published in St. Nicholas Magazine (1873)

Elizabeth Kingsley is credited with inventing the puzzle for Saturday Review in 1934, under the name double-crostic. Since then, other nonce words ending in "-crostic" have been used. Anacrostic may be the most accurate term used, and hence most common, as it is a portmanteau of anagram and acrostic, referencing the fact that the solution is an anagram of the clue answers, and the author of the quote is hidden in the clue answers acrostically. Later Saturday Review constructors were Doris Nash Wortman, Thomas Middleton, and Barry Tunick. Thomas Middleton also produced many puzzles for Harpers Magazine. Kingsley, Wortman, and Middleton created additional puzzles for The New York Times from 1952 to 1999, but not more than one every other week. Emily Cox and Henry Rathvon took over the bi-weekly setting duties for the NYT in 1999.

A similar puzzle, called a Trans-O-Gram, by Svend Petersen, and later, Kem Putney, appeared in National Review from 1963 to 1993. Trans-O-Grams were often themed puzzles, with clues related to the quote. The name Duo-Crostic was used by the Los Angeles Times for puzzles by Barry Tunick and Sylvia Bursztyn. Charles Preston created Quote-Acrostics for The Washington Post. Charles Duerr, who died in 1999, authored many "Dur-acrostic" books and was a contributor of acrostics to the Saturday Review. Michael Ashley's "Double Cross" acrostics have appeared in GAMES and GAMES World of Puzzles since 1978.

Writer and academic Isaac Asimov enjoyed acrostics, comparing them favorably to crossword puzzles. In "Yours, Isaac Asimov", published three years after his 1992 death, he wrote, "As it happens, I don't... have time for hobbies. But I am a fiend at Crostics. Crostics don't have the public that crosswords do, because Crostics seem hard. They aren't, and they're infinitely more interesting than crosswords."
