= The New York Times crossword =

Daily American-style crossword puzzle

- Editor: Will Shortz
- Frequency: Daily
- Format: Newspaper; Web; Mobile (iOS, Android)
- Publisher: The New York Times
- First issue: February 15, 1942; 84 years ago
- Website: nytimes.com/crosswords

The New York Times crossword is a daily American-style crossword puzzle published in The New York Times, syndicated to more than 300 other newspapers and journals, and released online on the newspaper's website and mobile apps as part of The New York Times Games.

The puzzle is created by various freelance constructors and has been edited by Will Shortz since 1993. The crosswords are designed to increase in difficulty throughout the week, with the easiest on Monday and the most difficult on Saturday. The larger Sunday crossword, which appears in The New York Times Magazine, is an icon in American culture; it is typically intended to be a "Wednesday or Thursday" in difficulty. The standard daily crossword is 15 by 15 squares, while the Sunday crossword measures 21 by 21 squares. Many of the puzzle's rules were created by its first editor, Margaret Farrar.

== History ==
Although crosswords became popular in the early 1920s, The New York Times initially considered them frivolous, calling them "a primitive form of mental exercise", and did not run a crossword until February 15, 1942, in its Sunday edition. It was published under a pseudonym Farrar occasionally used, "Anna Gram".

The motivating impulse for the Times to finally run the puzzle (which took over 20 years even though its publisher, Arthur Hays Sulzberger, was a longtime crossword fan) appears to have been the bombing of Pearl Harbor; in a memo dated December 18, 1941, an editor conceded that the puzzle deserved space in the paper, considering what was happening elsewhere in the world and that readers might need something to occupy themselves during blackouts. The puzzle proved popular, and Sulzberger himself authored a Times puzzle before the year was out.

In 1950, the crossword became a daily feature. That first daily puzzle was published without an author line, and as of 2001 the identity of the author of the first weekday Times crossword remained unknown.

There have been four editors of the puzzle. Farrar edited the puzzle from its inception in 1942 until 1969. She created many of the rules that have become standard, such as creating the grid, limiting the number of black squares, creating a minimum word length of three letters, requiring grids to have rotational symmetry and be an odd number of squares by an odd number of squares, and forbidding unchecked squares. The second editor was Will Weng, former head of the Times's metropolitan copy desk. Weng served until 1977, and Eugene T. Maleska, the third editor, until 1993. The current editor is Will Shortz. In addition to editing the Times crosswords, Shortz founded and runs the annual American Crossword Puzzle Tournament as well as the World Puzzle Championship (where he remains captain of the U.S. team); has published numerous books of crosswords, sudoku, and other puzzles; authors occasional variety puzzles (also known as "second Sunday puzzles") to appear alongside the Sunday Times puzzle; and serves as "Puzzlemaster" on the NPR show Weekend Edition Sunday. There have also been two interim editors of the puzzle: Mel Taub from September 6 to November 20, 1993, after Maleska's death; and Joel Fagliano, from March to December 2024, while Shortz was on medical leave.

The puzzle's popularity grew until it came to be considered the most prestigious of the widely circulated U.S. crosswords. Many celebrities and public figures have publicly proclaimed their liking for the puzzle, including opera singer Beverly Sills, author Norman Mailer, baseball pitcher Mike Mussina, former President Bill Clinton, conductor Leonard Bernstein, TV host Jon Stewart, actress Gillian Jacobs, and music duo the Indigo Girls.

Times puzzles have been collected in hundreds of books by various publishers, most notably Random House and St. Martin's Press, the current publisher of the series. In addition to appearing in the printed newspaper, the puzzles also appear online on the paper's website, where they require a separate subscription to access. In 2007, Majesco released The New York Times Crosswords game, a video game adaptation for the Nintendo DS handheld. The game includes over 1,000 Times crosswords from all days of the week. Various other forms of merchandise featuring the puzzle have been created, including dedicated electronic crossword handhelds that just contain Times crosswords, and a variety of Times crossword-themed memorabilia, including cookie jars, baseballs, cufflinks, plates, coasters, and mousepads.

== Style and conventions ==
The New York Times example crossword grid

Will Shortz does not write the Times crossword himself; a wide variety of contributors submit puzzles to him. A full specification sheet listing the paper's requirements for crossword puzzle submission can be found online or by writing to the paper.

The Monday–Thursday, and usually Sunday, puzzles have a theme. This is often some sort of connection between at least three long across answers, such as similar types of puns, added letters, or hidden synonyms. These puzzles often have entries known as "revealers", phrases that (often punnily) relate to the themed entries and may help explain the link. Notable dates such as holidays or anniversaries of famous events are often commemorated with an appropriately themed puzzle, although only two are routinely commemorated annually: Christmas and April Fool's Day.

The Friday and Saturday puzzles, the most difficult, are almost always themeless and "wide open", with fewer black squares and more long words. The maximum word count for a themed weekday puzzle is normally 78 words, while the maximum for a themeless Friday or Saturday puzzle is 72; Sunday puzzles must contain 140 words or fewer. Given the Times's reputation as a paper for a literate, well-read, and somewhat arty audience, puzzles frequently reference works of literature, art, or classical music, as well as modern TV, movies, or other touchstones of popular culture.

The puzzle follows a number of conventions, both for tradition's sake and to aid solvers in completing the crossword:

- Nearly all the Times crossword grids have rotational symmetry: they can be rotated 180 degrees and remain identical. Rarely, puzzles with only vertical or horizontal symmetry can be found; yet rarer are asymmetrical puzzles, usually when an unusual theme requires breaking the symmetry rule. Starting in January 2020, diagonal symmetry began appearing in Friday and Saturday puzzles. This rule has been part of the puzzle since the beginning; when asked why, initial editor Margaret Farrar is said to have responded, "Because it is prettier."
- Any time a clue contains the tag "Abbr." or an abbreviation more significant than "e.g.", the answer will be an abbreviation (e.g., [M.D. org.] for AMA).
- A play on words is called out by either
  - a clue ending in a question mark (e.g., [Fitness center?] for CORE), or
  - a clue followed by a comma and the word "maybe". (e.g., [Fresh answer, maybe] for SASS)
- Occasionally, themed puzzles will require certain squares to be filled in with a symbol, multiple letters, or a word, rather than one letter (so-called "rebus" puzzles). This symbol/letters/word will be repeated in each themed entry. For example, the December 6, 2012, puzzle by Jeff Chen featured a rebus theme based on the chemical pH scale used for acids and bases, which required the letters "pH" to be written together in a single square in several entries (in the middle of entries such as "triumpH" or "sopHocles").
- French answers, and less commonly those in other languages, such as Spanish and Latin, are indicated by:
  - a tag in the clue giving the answer language (e.g., [Winter: Fr.] for HIVER), or
  - the clue itself being in that language (e.g., [Saison] for ETE), or
  - an English prompt with a place where the language is spoken (e.g., [A river in Orleans] for FLEUVE), [A Parisian tower] for TOUR). Foreign words that contain accented letters typically omit the accents in the answer (e.g., [Mother in Montreal] for MERE).
- Clues and answers must always match in part of speech, tense, aspect, number, and degree. A plural clue always indicates a plural answer and a clue in the past tense always has an answer in the past tense. A clue containing a comparative or superlative always has an answer in the same degree (e.g., [Most difficult] for TOUGHEST).
- The answer word(s) will not appear in the clue itself. The number of words in the answer is not given in the clue—so a one-word clue can have a multiple-word answer.
- The theme, if any, will be applied consistently throughout the puzzle; e.g., if one of the theme entries is a particular variety of pun, all the theme entries will be of that type. Theme answers will tend to be the longest answers and often appear in reverse symmetry throughout the puzzle, although not always.
- Unlike in some word games, popular proper nouns, brand names, abbreviations, and even symbols can be used.
- No entries involving profanity, sad or disturbing topics, or overly explicit answers are allowed, though some have sneaked in. The April 3, 2006, puzzle contained the word SCUMBAG (a slang term for a condom), which had previously appeared in a Times article quoting people using the word. Shortz apologized and said the term would not appear again. PENIS also appeared once in a Shortz-edited puzzle in 1995, clued as ["The __ mightier than the sword"].
- Spoken phrases are always indicated by enclosure in quotation marks, e.g., ["Get out of here!"] for LEAVE NOW.
- Verbalizations of certain invoked actions are sometimes clued by square brackets, often including an exclamation point or question mark. e.g., [[It's cold!]] for BRR, [[We finally made it!]] for PHEW [[Why?]] for SHRUG.
- When an extended phrase of the answer can also be used in the clue to mutual meaning, the mutual extension is indicated in parentheses. e.g., [Think (over)] for MULL, [Drive (away)] for PUSH.
- When the answer can use an additional word to fit the clue, the word is preceded by "with" and placed in quotes. e.g., [Understand, with "in"] for SINK.
- Times style is to always capitalize the first letter of a clue, regardless of whether the clue is a complete sentence or whether the first word is a proper noun. On occasion, this is used to deliberately create difficulties for the solver; e.g., in the clue [John, for one], it is ambiguous whether the clue is referring to the proper name John or to the slang term for a bathroom. All proper nouns are capitalized regardless of place in the clue.

== Related puzzle grids ==
=== The Mini and Midi ===
The Times Online also publishes two other crosswords: the Mini, frequently constructed by Joel Fagliano, which is 5×5 Sunday through Friday and 7×7 on Saturdays; and the Midi, which is "between 9×9 and 11×11 every day, with 9×9 being the default size". The Mini is popular, but has also been criticized, sometimes harshly, for its comparative simplicity—with one review of the game in Slate magazine titled "Utter Disgrace to the NYT Crossword Brand". Other mini and larger 11×11 midi puzzles are sometimes offered as bonuses.

=== Super Mega ===
The "Super Mega" is a 50x50 crossword published in the Times's annual "Puzzle Mania" section. In 2022, the grid was 67x41, making it the largest Times crossword ever.

=== Variety crosswords ===
The smaller puzzle, which would occupy the lower part of the page, could provide variety each Sunday. It could be topical, humorous, have rhymed definitions or story definitions or quiz definitions. The combination of these two would offer meat and dessert, and catch the fancy of all types of puzzlers.

— Margaret Farrar, the Times' eventual first crossword editor, in a December 18, 1941 memo during the paper's crosswords consideration.

In addition to the primary crossword, the Times publishes a second Sunday puzzle each week of varying types in The New York Times Magazine. Currently, every other week features a rotating selection, including an acrostic (long written by Emily Cox and Henry Rathvon); other kinds of crosswords (cryptic "British-style crosswords", puns and anagrams, spiral, diagramless, etc.); word puzzles of other formats (Split Decisions, Marching Bands, etc.); and, more rarely, other types (some authored by Shortz himself—the only puzzles he has created for the Times during his tenure as crossword editor).

==== Acrostic puzzles ====
The acrostic, in particular, has the longest history. The puzzle began publishing on May 9, 1943, authored by Elizabeth S. Kingsley, who is credited with inventing the puzzle type, and continued to write the Times acrostic until December 28, 1952. From then until August 13, 1967, it was written by Kingsley's former assistant, Doris Nash Wortman; then it was taken over by Thomas H. Middleton for a period of over 30 years, until August 15, 1999, when the pair of Cox and Rathvon became just the fourth author of the puzzle in its history. The name of the puzzle also changed over the years, from "Double-Crostic" to "Kingsley Double-Crostic", "Acrostic Puzzle", and, finally since 1991, just "Acrostic".

== Records and puzzles of note ==
Fans of the Times crossword have kept track of a number of records and interesting puzzles (primarily from among those published in Shortz's tenure), including those below. (All puzzles published from November 21, 1993, on are available to online subscribers to the Times crossword.)

- Fewest words in a daily 15x15 puzzle: 50 words, on Saturday, June 29, 2013, by Joe Krozel; in a Sunday puzzle: 117 words on November 2, 2025, by Rafael Musa.
- Most words in a daily puzzle: 86 words on Tuesday, December 23, 2008, by Joe Krozel; in a 21x21 Sunday puzzle: 150 words, on June 26, 1994, by Nancy Nicholson Joline and on November 21, 1993, by Peter Gordon (the first Sunday puzzle edited by Will Shortz).
- Fewest black squares (in a daily 15x15 puzzle): 17 blocks, on Friday, July 27, 2012, by Joe Krozel.
- Most prolific author: Manny Nosowsky is the crossword constructor who has been published most frequently in the Times under Shortz, with 241 puzzles (254 including pre-Shortz-era puzzles, published before 1993), although others may have written more puzzles than that under prior editors. The record for most Sunday puzzles is held by Jack Luzzatto, with 119 (including two written under pseudonyms); former editor Eugene T. Maleska wrote 110 himself, including 8 under other names.
- Youngest constructor: Harrison Walden was 13 when he published his first solo Times crossword. He was eight years old when he first published as a co-constructor.
- Oldest constructor: Bernice Gordon was 100 on August 11, 2014, when her final Times crossword was published. (She died in 2015 at the age of 101.) Gordon published over 150 crosswords in the Times since her first puzzle was published by Margaret Farrar in 1952.
- Greatest difference in ages between two constructors of a single puzzle: 83, a puzzle by David Steinberg (age 16) and Bernice Gordon (age 99) with the theme AGE DIFFERENCE.
- 15-letter-word stacks: On December 29, 2012, Joe Krozel stacked five 15-letter entries, something never before or since achieved. Krozel, Martin Ashwood-Smith, George Barany and Erik Agard have stacked four 15-letter entries in a puzzle. Since 2010, Krozel, Ashwood-Smith, Kevin G. Der, and Jason Flinn have stacked two sets of four 15-letter entries in a puzzle.
- Lowest word count for a debut puzzle: 62 words, on Saturday, June 1, 2019, by Ari Richter.

A few crosswords have achieved recognition beyond the community of crossword solvers. Perhaps the most famous is the November 5, 1996, puzzle by Jeremiah Farrell, published on the day of the U.S. presidential election, which has been featured in the movie Wordplay and the book The Crossword Obsession by Coral Amende, as well as discussed by Peter Jennings on ABC News, featured on CNN, and elsewhere. The two leading candidates that year were Bill Clinton and Bob Dole; in Farrell's puzzle, the 39-Across clue read [Lead story in tomorrow's newspaper (!), with 43-Across.] As 43-Across was ELECTED, the two clues together could either spell out CLINTON ELECTED or BOB DOLE ELECTED, and all the Down clues and answers that crossed it would work either way (e.g., [Black Halloween animal] could be either BAT or CAT depending on which answer you filled in at 39-Across; similarly [French 101 word] could equal LUI or OUI, etc.). Constructors have dubbed this type of puzzle a Schrödinger or quantum puzzle after the famous paradox of Schrödinger's cat, which was both alive and dead at the same time. The first Schrödinger puzzle in the Times, by Ralph G. Beaman, appeared eight years earlier, and as of October 2024, 19 Times puzzles have used a similar trick.

In another notable Times crossword, 27-year-old Bill Gottlieb proposed to his girlfriend, Emily Mindel, via the crossword puzzle of January 7, 1998, written by noted crossword constructor Bob Klahn. The answer to 14-Across, [Microsoft chief, to some] was BILLG, also Gottlieb's name and last initial. 20-Across, [1729 Jonathan Swift pamphlet], was A MODEST PROPOSAL. And 56-Across, [1992 Paula Abdul hit], was WILL YOU MARRY ME. Gottlieb's girlfriend said yes. The puzzle attracted attention in the AP, an article in the Times itself, and elsewhere. Other Times crosswords with a notable wedding element include the June 25, 2010, puzzle by Byron Walden and Robin Schulman, which has rebuses spelling I DO throughout, and the January 8, 2020, puzzle by Joon Pahk and Amanda Yesnowitz, which was used at the latter’s wedding reception.

On May 7, 2007, former U.S. president Bill Clinton, a self-professed long-time fan of the Times crossword, collaborated with noted crossword constructor Cathy Millhauser on an online-only crossword in which Millhauser constructed the grid and Clinton wrote the clues. Shortz described the President's work as "laugh out loud" and noted that he as editor changed very little of Clinton's clues, which featured more wordplay than found in a standard puzzle. Clinton made his print constructing debut on Friday, May 12, 2017, collaborating with Vic Fleming on one of the co-constructed puzzles celebrating the crossword's 75th Anniversary.

The Times crossword of Thursday, April 2, 2009, by Brendan Emmett Quigley, featured theme answers that ran the gamut of movie ratings—beginning with the kid-friendly "G" and finishing with adults-only "X" (now replaced by the less crossword-friendly "NC-17"). The seven theme entries were GARY GYGAX, GRAND PRIX, GORE-TEX, GAG REFLEX, GUMMO MARX, GASOLINE TAX, and GENERATION X. In addition, the puzzle contained the clues/answers of [Weird Al Yankovic's "__ on Jeopardy"] for I LOST and ["I'll take New York Times crossword for $200, __"] for ALEX. What made the puzzle notable is that the previous day's episode of the US television show Jeopardy! featured video clues of Will Shortz for five of the theme answers (all but GARY GYGAX and GENERATION X).

On April 19, 2026, the Times published a crossword that was unsolvable, the first in its history. The crossword in question initially included a missing 5-across clue before it was corrected in the digital edition.

== Controversies ==
The Times crossword has been criticized for a lack of diversity in its constructors and clues. Major crosswords like those in the Times have historically been created and edited primarily by older white men. Less than 30% of puzzle constructors in the Shortz Era have been women. In the 2010s, only 27% of clued figures were female, and 20% were of minority racial groups.

In January 2019, the Times crossword was criticized for including the racial slur "BEANER" (clued as "Pitch to the head, informally", but also a derogatory slur for Mexicans). Shortz apologized for the distraction this may have caused solvers, saying that he had never heard the slur before.

In 2022, the Times was criticized after many readers claimed that its December 18 crossword grid resembled a Nazi swastika. Some were particularly upset that the puzzle was published on the first night of Hanukkah. In a statement, the Times said the resemblance was unintentional, stemming from the grid's rotational symmetry. The Times was also criticized in 2017 and 2014 for crossword grids that resembled a swastika, which it both times defended as a coincidence.

== See also ==
- Wordplay (2006 documentary film about the crossword)
- The New York Times Games – Casual games by The New York Times
