= Frank Longo =

American writer and puzzle creator

Frank Longo is an American puzzle creator and author of more than 90 books, which have sold more than 2 million copies.

Longo is known for creating unusual puzzles, such as a 10x10 sudoku and a crossword on a 50x50 grid. He is the creator and author of The New York Times Spelling Bee anagram puzzle.

Longo's first published crossword puzzle was a 21x21 grid published in Games in 1993. He has since had more than 3,000 crossword puzzles published.

Longo is noted as an influence by several puzzle creators, including Brendan Emmett Quigley and Joanne Sullivan.
