= Elizabeth Kingsley =

Elizabeth S. Kingsley (née Seelman) (1871 – June 8, 1957) was an American puzzle constructor, famous for being the inventor of the double-crostic.

Kingsley was born in Brooklyn and attended Wellesley College (Class of 1898). While she was working as a teacher in Brooklyn in 1933, she created the double-crostic, a form of acrostic puzzle that includes features of a crossword puzzle, and eventually sold it to the Saturday Review. Michelle Arnot describes how she invented it, after a Wellesley reunion at which she "despaired that students embraced twentieth-century scribblers like James Joyce":

Tailoring a crossword grid, she stretched its boundaries to create a rectangle. Taking an excerpt from a favorite author, she filled in the grid reading left to right only; words were separated by black squares and continued below and to the left when necessary. Each blank square was assigned a number from 1, at the top left, to 178, at the bottom right corner. Her first selection was six lines from the poem “Ulysses” by Alfred, Lord Tennyson... Spelling out the poem in anagram tiles, she threw all 178 letters into a pot. From this alphabet soup she pulled out eighteen letters for the poet's name and seven for his work, which she set down in a column. In the style of an acrostic puzzle, these four words provided the first letters for a system of twenty-five anagrams. ... Six months of nonstop production yielded a manuscript of a hundred double crostic puzzles. In March 1934, Kingsley left the pages at the offices of The Saturday Review of Literature... On a Tuesday, the contract was signed; and soon after, Kingsley set up shop at the Henry Hudson Hotel, where she personally crafted a weekly puzzle from her home office. Simon & Schuster gave her a series, and she introduced an acrostic feature for the Sunday Times puzzle page.

The first puzzle was published on March 31, 1934; she wrote puzzles for The New York Times between May 9, 1943, and December 28, 1952. This form of puzzle is still popular today.
