= Emily Cox and Henry Rathvon =

American puzzle-writing team

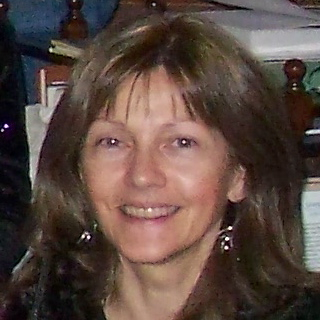
Emily Cox

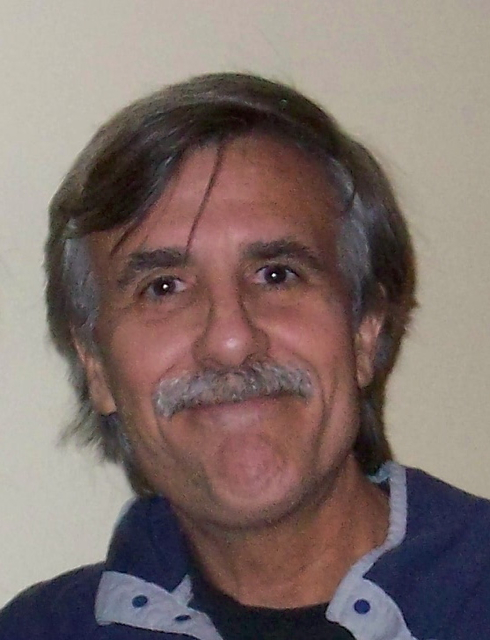
Henry Rathvon

Emily Cox and Henry Rathvon are a married, retired American puzzle-writing team. They wrote the "Atlantic Puzzler", a monthly cryptic crossword in The Atlantic magazine, from September 1977 to October 2009, and wrote cryptic crosswords every four weeks for The Wall Street Journal from 2010 to 2023.

Often published under the pseudonym Hex, Cox and Rathvon are considered pioneers of the American cryptic crossword and remain among the form's greatest exponents. Their first efforts were inspired by attempts to follow in the footsteps of Stephen Sondheim and Richard Maltby, Jr. at New York magazine.

== Cryptic crosswords for The Atlantic and The Wall Street Journal ==
Their first cryptic puzzle for The Atlantic, on 1 September 1977, was entitled "Short and Sweet." They wrote a total of 370 puzzles for The Atlantic, although, beginning in March 2006, the Atlantic Puzzler was published online-only.

Their first cryptic for the Wall Street Journal in January 2010 subtly announced their new home; it was entitled "Relocation." The instructions began,

It’s Moving Day! We’ve packed everything into 143 boxes and left it for you, dear solver, to figure out what goes where.

"Relocation" was the first of 181 Journal puzzles.

All of their puzzles for The Atlantic and The Wall Street Journal are available online.

== Retirement ==
They retired in December 2023. Their retirement was announced, cryptically, in their 16 December 2023 WSJ Saturday Variety Puzzle, "Departure."

== Other work ==
They also created acrostics and cryptic crosswords for the New York Times, cryptics for Canada's National Post, puzzles for the US Airways in-flight magazine, and (with Henry Hook) Sunday crosswords for the Boston Globe.

In 2007, they created an elaborate marriage proposal for two aficionados of the Sunday Boston Globe Magazine crossword. Aric Egmont and Jennie Bass, a young couple in Boston, shared a love of crossword puzzles, and were accustomed to doing the Sunday crossword puzzle together. Intending to propose, and hoping for a great surprise, Aric approached Doug Most, the editor of the Globe Magazine, and through him, Cox and Rathvon, soliciting a special crossword. Cox and Rathvon's puzzle, "Popping the Question," appeared on Sunday 23 September 2007, and was filled both with personal references for Jennie — the names of her friend, her sister, and even Egmont's name — and with various clued clever forms of marriage proposal. The answer to "A poker player's proposal" was "May I have your hand," and to "Macrame artist's proposal" was "Let's tie the knot." The two most significant clues were 111 across, "Generic Proposal," a typically cryptic homophonic clue combining "Jen" and "Aric," and 116 across, "Winston's mother." The answers, of course, were "Will you marry me?" and "Jennie." Her answer was an emphatic "Yes."

In 2005, Rathvon's play Trapezium, a comedy in iambic pentameter, was produced by the Orlando-UCF Shakespeare Festival. The play was also performed at Playhouse on Park in West Hartford, CT in 2010.

== Personal life ==
Cox's parents were the pianist Shirley Louise (née Peet) Cox and the Rev. Dr. Howard H. Cox. From a young age, Emily showed interest in playing trombone, painting suspension bridges, reading about science matters, and rock climbing.

Cox and Rathvon, who are married, at one point lived in Hershey, Pennsylvania.
