= Word game =

Puzzles, board games, or video games based on language

Word games are spoken, board, card or video games often designed to test ability with language or to explore its properties.

Word games are generally used as a source of entertainment, but can additionally serve an educational purpose. Young children may enjoy playing games such as Mad Libs Junior, while developing spelling and writing skills. Researchers have found that adults who regularly solve crossword puzzles, which require familiarity with a larger vocabulary, have better brain function later in life.

Popular word-based game shows have been a part of television and radio throughout broadcast history, including Spelling Bee, the first televised game show, and Wheel of Fortune, the longest-running syndicated game show in the United States.

== Categories ==
=== Letter arrangement games ===
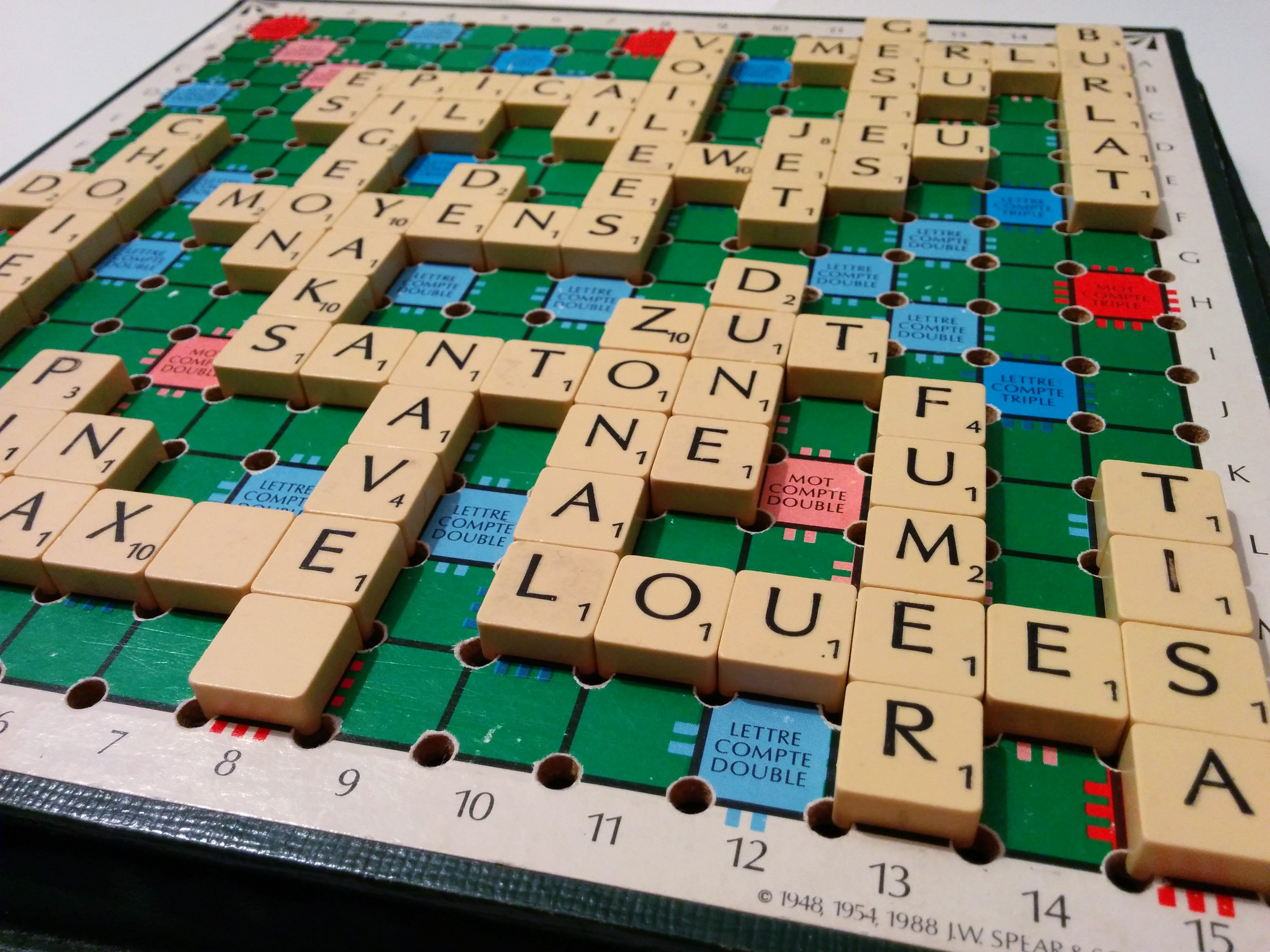
A game of Scrabble in French

In a letter arrangement game, the goal is to form words out of given letters. These games generally test vocabulary skills as well as lateral thinking skills. Some examples of letter arrangement games include Scrabble, Upwords, Bananagrams, and Countdown.

=== Paper and pencil games ===
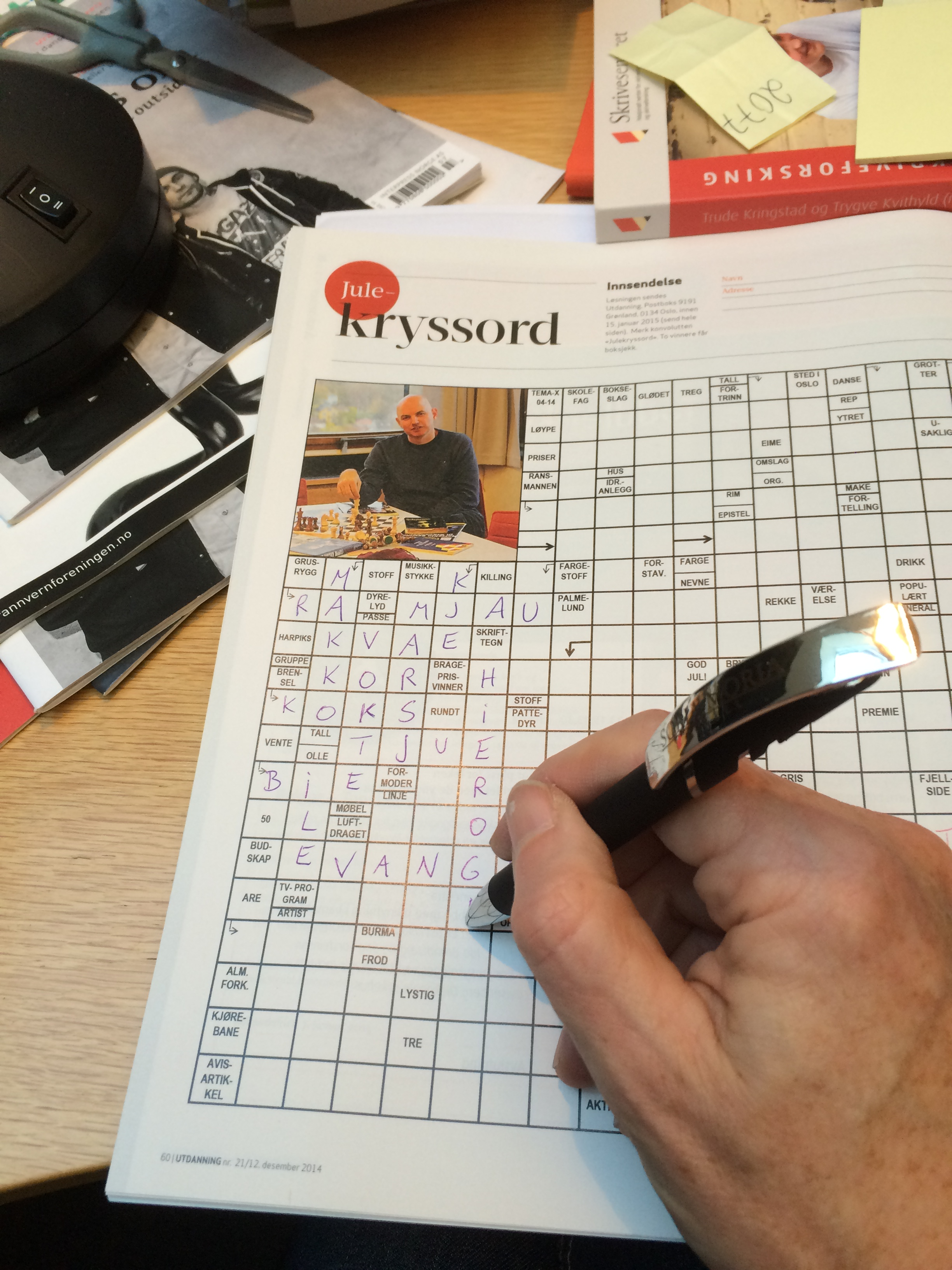
A crossword puzzle

In a paper and pencil game, players write their own words, often under specific constraints. For example, a crossword requires players to use clues to fill out a grid, with words intersecting at specific letters. Other examples of paper and pencil games include hangman, categories, Boggle, and word searches.

=== Semantic games ===
Semantic games focus on the semantics of words, utilising their meanings and the shared knowledge of players as a mechanic. Connections, Mad Libs, Blankety Blank, and Codenames are all semantic games.

=== Word formation games ===
Games involving creating words that meet specific conditions, such as Wordle and Word Ladder.

== Modern word games ==
As part of the modern "Golden Age" of board games, designers have created a variety of newer, non-traditional word games, often with more complex rules. Games like Codenames, Decrypto, and Anomia were all designed after 2010, and have earned widespread acclaim. Mobile games like Letterpress, Words with Friends, and Word Connect have also brought word games to modern audiences.

== In media ==
Many popular word games have been adapted to television and radio game shows. In addition to the examples given above, shows like Lingo, Says You!, Catchphrase, and Only Connect either revolve around or include elements of word games. On NPR, the Sunday Puzzle is hosted by Will Shortz, The New York Times crossword editor.

Word games have also been launched on the Internet and featured in major publications, such as The New York Times Spelling Bee, Connections, and Wordle.

== See also ==
- Anagram dictionary
- Double entendre
- Language game
- List of puzzle video games
- Phono-semantic matching
- Puns
- Puzzles
- Rebuses – picture puzzles representing a word
- Verbal arithmetic
- Word chain
- Word play
- Word Ways: The Journal of Recreational Linguistics
