= Will Shortz =

American puzzle creator and editor (born 1952)

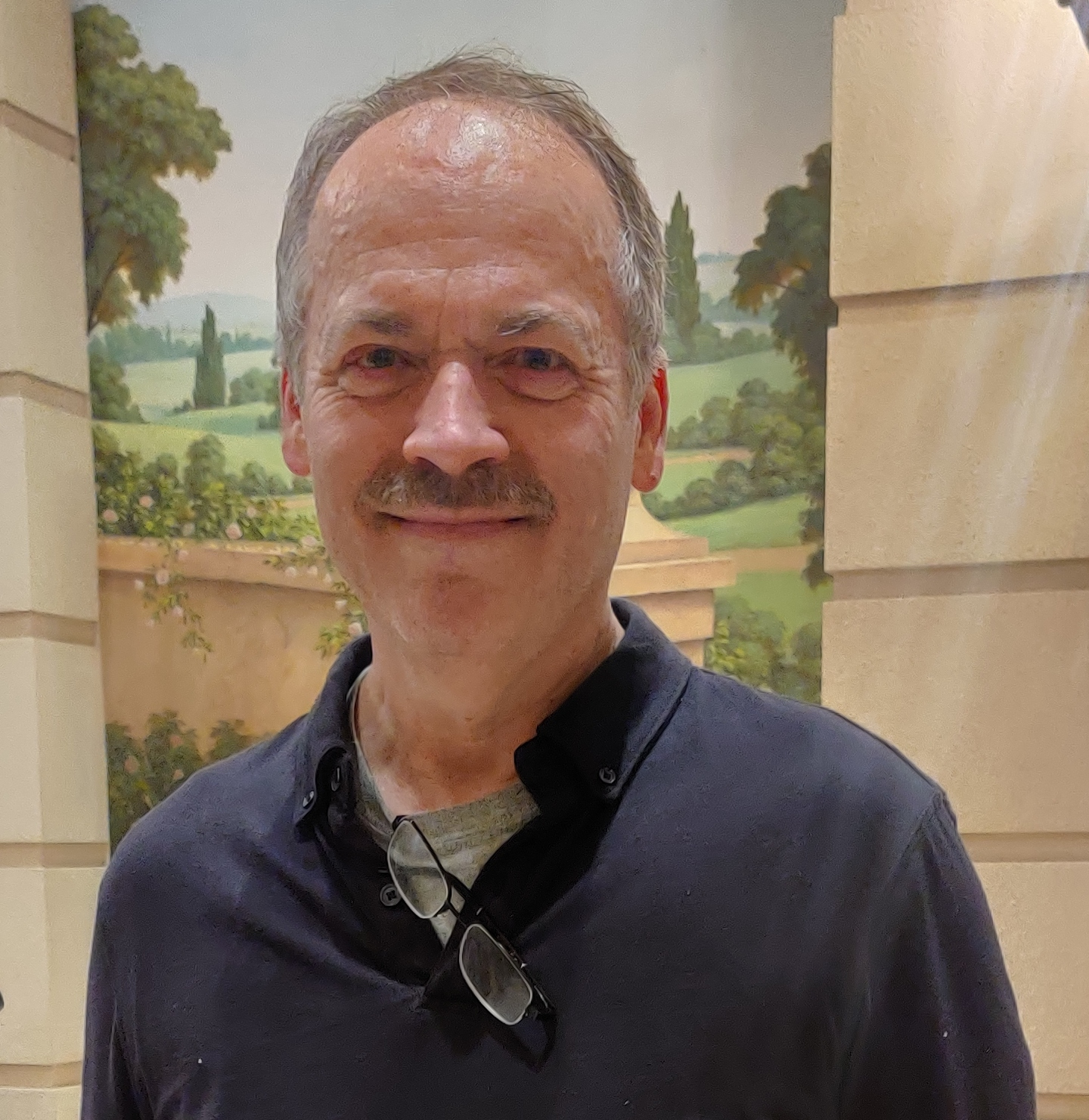
- Shortz in 2023
- Born: William F. Shortz; August 26, 1952 (age 74); Crawfordsville, Indiana, U.S.
- Other name: The Puzzlemaster
- Education: Indiana University Bloomington (B.A.); University of Virginia (J.D.)
- Occupations: Crossword editor Table tennis center owner
- Notable credit(s): New York Times puzzle editor (since 1993), NPR's Weekend Edition Sunday puzzlemaster (since 1987)

William F. Shortz (born August 26, 1952) is an American cruciverbalist and editor of The New York Times crossword. He graduated from Indiana University with a degree in the invented field of enigmatology. After starting his career at Penny Press and Games magazine, he was hired by The New York Times in 1993.

Shortz's American Crossword Puzzle Tournament is the country's oldest and largest crossword tournament.

== Early life and education ==
Shortz was born on August 26, 1952, and raised on an Arabian horse farm in Crawfordsville, Indiana. He was drawn to puzzles at an early age; in eighth grade he wrote a paper titled "Puzzles as a Profession". (The paper earned him a B+.) At age 13, Shortz wrote to Language on Vacation author Dmitri Borgmann for advice on how to pursue a career in puzzles. At age 16, Shortz began regularly contributing crossword puzzles to Dell Publishing.

Shortz graduated from Indiana University in 1974, and is the only person known to hold a college degree in enigmatology, the study of puzzles, which he achieved by designing his own curriculum through Indiana University's Individualized Major Program. Shortz wrote his thesis about the history of American word puzzles. He also earned a Juris Doctor degree from the University of Virginia School of Law (1977), but did not sit for the bar exam, opting for a career in puzzles instead.

Shortz is the author or editor of more than 100 books and owns over 20,000 puzzle books and magazines dating back to 1545, reportedly the world's largest private library on the subject. He is a member and historian of the National Puzzlers' League.

== Career ==
Shortz began his career at Penny Press Magazines, then moved to Games magazine for 15 years, including as its editor from 1989 until it temporarily folded in 1990. He was rehired in late 1991, then let go in August 1993.

In 1978, Shortz founded the American Crossword Puzzle Tournament, and has been its director since then. He founded the World Puzzle Championship in 1992 and is a director of the U.S. Puzzle Team.

He has also been the puzzle master on NPR's Weekend Edition Sunday since its launch in 1987, where he hosts the Sunday Puzzle, a cooperative game between the show's host and one of the show's listeners. The lucky player is picked randomly from a group of submissions containing the correct answer to a qualifier puzzle issued the week before.

In October 1993, he succeeded Eugene T. Maleska to become The New York Times crossword editor, the fourth in its history.

In February 2009, Shortz helped introduce the KenKen puzzle into The New York Times. In 2013, Shortz lent his name and talents in puzzle writing and editing to a new bimonthly publication entitled Will Shortz' WordPlay, published by Penny Press. He has said that his favorite crossword of all time is Jeremiah Farrell's Election Day crossword from November 5, 1996. Known as a Schrödinger or quantum puzzle, it had two correct solutions from the same set of clues; one saying that the "Lead story in tomorrow's newspaper (!)" would be "BOB DOLE ELECTED", and the other saying "CLINTON ELECTED". His favorite individual clue is "It might turn into a different story" (whose solution is SPIRAL STAIRCASE).

In addition to his work as a crossword editor, Shortz is a skilled table tennis player. He has co-owned the Westchester Table Tennis Center in Pleasantville, New York since 2009, and has been playing table tennis daily for the past 11 years.

=== Controversies ===
In 2017, Shortz published a NYT crossword by a prisoner named Lonnie Burton who was convicted of raping a 15-year-old boy, in addition to having burglary and robbery charges, prompting backlash from some solvers. Shortz did not include the reason for Burton's imprisonment in his accompanying blog post. Burton had previously had crosswords published in the Los Angeles Times. The Times public editor Liz Spayd wrote in an article on the decision, "What I question is the decision not to tell readers what Burton did. [...] I understand Shortz’ reflex to hold back such dark information given the levity of a puzzle, but not doing so may have made matters worse. It left some readers with the feeling of being tricked."

At various times in his career Shortz has apologized for cluing decisions that sparked public backlash for being racist, sexist, or otherwise offensive.

In 2019, The New York Times issued an apology after Shortz chose to publish the racial slur "BEANER" in the crossword, cluing it as "Pitch to the head, informally". Shortz admitted that he saw the derogatory definition when he researched the word, but claimed he had never personally heard it, and explained that as long as a word also has a "benign" meaning, it meets his editorial standards for publication. Shortz defended his use of "BEANER" and noted he has published and stands by the benign meanings of the terms "CHINK" and "GO OK" (or "GOOK"), both slurs for people of Asian descent.

In 2020, more than 600 crossword constructors and solvers signed an open letter to the NYT executive director of puzzles, asking him to address systemic biases against women and minorities within both its puzzle department and the puzzle itself. The letter also highlighted the resignation of Claire Muscat, a test-solver who said she was only hired to provide a perfunctory token female perspective.

== Honors and awards ==
- On May 3, 2008, Shortz gave the commencement speech for his alma mater, Indiana University. As an introduction to his speech, Shortz quizzed the audience on well-known IU graduates and their unconventional majors. He advised recent graduates to pick a career in which they "don't mind the least interesting parts." Shortz apparently also wrote brainteasers and a hidden message that were included in the printed commencement program.
- In May 2010, he was given an honorary Doctor of Humane Letters degree from Wabash College in Crawfordsville, Indiana.
- In 2012, he received the Sam Loyd Award from the Association for Games & Puzzles International for creating interest in mechanical puzzles.
- In May 2016, he gave the commencement speech at the University of Virginia Law School Commencement.
- In May 2018, Shortz was given an honorary Doctor of Humane Letters degree from Indiana University.

== In popular culture ==
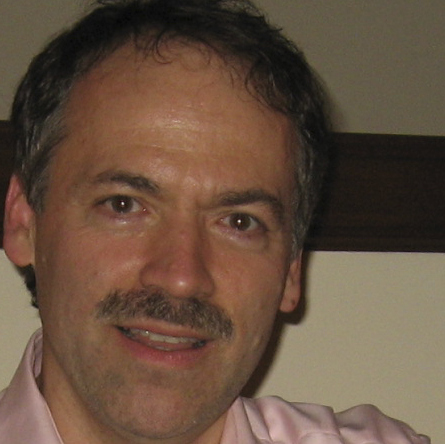
Shortz in 2006

=== Television appearances ===
- Shortz has been a guest on TV talk shows, including Martha Stewart Living, Oprah, The Daily Show, and The Colbert Report.
- He has appeared on Millionaire as an expert for the "Ask the Expert" lifeline.
- Shortz appeared on an episode of The Simpsons titled "Homer and Lisa Exchange Cross Words", which first aired on November 16, 2008.
- Shortz appeared in Dinner: Impossible as himself, challenging the chef to create dishes that mimic common English idioms at the annual American Crossword Puzzle Tournament. The episode aired on May 6, 2009.
- He appeared on an episode of How I Met Your Mother titled "Robots Versus Wrestlers", which first aired on May 10, 2010, during season 5. He appeared as himself at an upscale dinner party that included Arianna Huffington and Peter Bogdanovich, also playing themselves.
- On December 18, 2015, he presented the answers on Jeopardy! in the category "The New York Times Crossword".
- Shortz was mentioned in passing in Brooklyn Nine-Nine episodes "The Mattress" and "Mr. Santiago" before guest-starring in the 2018 episode "The Puzzle Master" as Sam Jepson, a rival puzzler to Vin Stermley.
- In 2018, Shortz was featured on HBO's Real Sports with Bryant Gumbel (ep. 254, May 2018).
- In 2020, Shortz was the "central character" on an episode of To Tell the Truth. Actress Gillian Jacobs identified him almost immediately due to recognizing his voice from Weekend Edition on NPR.

=== Movie appearances ===
- Shortz provided the puzzle clues which The Riddler (Jim Carrey) leaves for Batman (Val Kilmer) in the 1995 film Batman Forever.
- The 2006 documentary Wordplay by Patrick Creadon focuses on Shortz and the American Crossword Puzzle Tournament. Various famous fans of his puzzles such as Bill Clinton, Ken Burns, Jon Stewart, Daniel Okrent, Indigo Girls and Mike Mussina appear in the film.
- Shortz has a speaking cameo in three of the Hallmark "Crossword Mysteries" films. In one, "A Puzzle to Die For", he played a table tennis player, in honor of his pastime.

== Personal life ==
Shortz resides in Pleasantville, New York, where he works from home. He is an avid table tennis player. In May 2011, with Barbadian champion (and long-time friend) Robert Roberts, he opened one of the largest table tennis clubs in the Northeast in Pleasantville. In 2012, Shortz set a goal for himself to play table tennis every day for a year, but surpassed his goal, playing for 1000 consecutive days, and then eventually reaching a streak of 10 years in 2022.

In his free time, Shortz also enjoys biking, reading, traveling, and collecting antique puzzle books.

Shortz came out as gay in an interview with The New Yorker in February 2023. He married his husband in August 2023.

Shortz, who had a history of untreated hypertension, had a stroke at home on February 4, 2024, and a second larger stroke while being treated at Northern Westchester Hospital. He received intravenous thrombolysis. He began rehabilitation at Burke Rehabilitation Hospital, transferred in March to a subacute facility close to his home, and in April had returned home. As of November 2024, he was still in therapy as an outpatient multiple days per week. During Shortz's hospitalization and initial recovery, Joel Fagliano oversaw editing of the crossword for The New York Times through December 2024. Shortz, while still in recovery, returned to edit the crossword starting December 30, 2024.
