= Anagrams (game) =

Tile-based word game

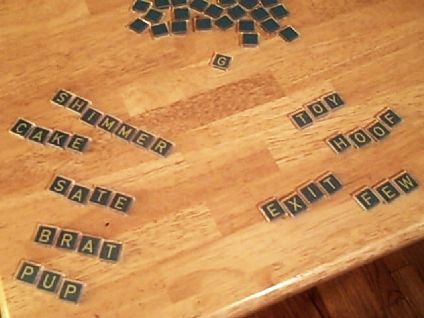
A game of Snatch, each player having already formed several words. The G tile has been turned over in the pool, and could be combined with SATE to make STAGE. If the leftmost player notices this first, they will get to keep the word STAGE in front of them; if the rightmost player spots it, they can steal the word and move it to their side. If neither can make a word using the G, another tile will be revealed.

Anagrams (also published under names including Anagram, Snatch and Word Making and Taking) is a tile-based word game that involves rearranging letter tiles to form words.

The game pieces are a set of tiles with letters on one side. Tiles are shuffled face-down then turned over one by one, players forming words by combining them with existing words, their own or others'. The game has never been standardized and there are many varieties of sets and rules. Anagrams is often played with tiles from another word game, such as Scrabble or Bananagrams.

== History ==
Reputed to have originated as a Victorian word game, Anagrams has appeared in many versions since then.

An early modern version is Charles Hammett's Word Making and Taking, released in 1877. The first version to include the word Anagrams in its name may have been The Game of Letters and Anagrams on Wooden Blocks, published by Parker Brothers around 1890. Another game called Anagrams was published in 1934 by Selchow and Righter, which published Scrabble in 1953. Spelling and Anagrams (a set incorporating two distinct games, Spelling and Anagrams) was also published in the 1930s. In 1975, Selchow published Scrabble Scoring Anagrams, which featured tiles with point values like those in Scrabble. Another version was published in the 1960s by the now defunct Transogram. The Embossing Company, formerly Halsam Products Company, also produced a yellow-on-black Eye-Rest set. Leslie Scott (the creator of Jenga) published a variation called Swipe in the early 1980s, and since 1990, Scott's company, Oxford Games Ltd, has published Anagram. Tyco published Up For Grabs in 1995. Prodijeux has been marketing a variant, WordXchange, since 2000, and Portobello Games produced a version, Snatch-It, in 2001. One Up! is a version that adds a "wild" tile that can be any letter, like a blank tile in Scrabble.

Some players use several sets of tiles from games such as Scrabble or Upwords to play Anagrams, and a version of the game is popular among tournament Scrabble players. Writers John Ciardi, James Merrill, John Malcolm Brinnin, and Richard Wilbur reputedly played together regularly in Key West, Florida, sometimes also with novelist John Hersey.

== Rules ==
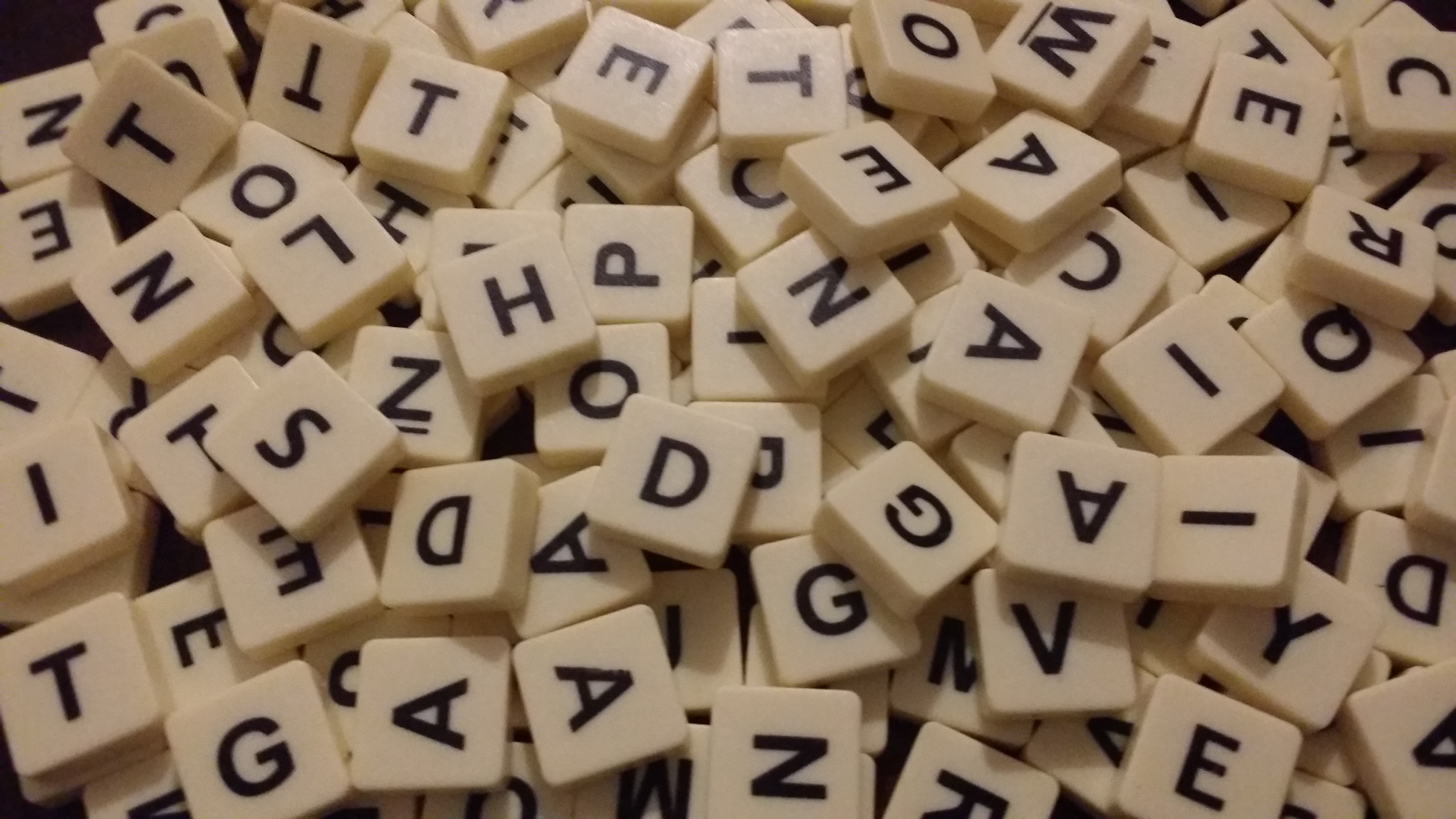
All games of Anagrams are played with letter tiles

Different editions of the game use different rules, and players now often play by house rules, but most are variants of the rules given here, taken from Snatch-It.

To begin, all tiles are placed face down in a pool in the middle of the table. Players then take turns flipping over tiles until somebody notices a word of three or more letters. A word can be formed by either:

- Using a number of face-up tiles from the pool
- "Stealing" a word from a player by combining it with one or more tiles from the pool to make a new word (e.g., the word TRACK may be formed with a K from the pool and a player's CART). Players may also combine their own words with additional tiles from the pool in the same way.

When a player sees a word, they call it immediately (irrespective of who flipped the last tile) and place the word in front of them. The game then continues with further tiles being flipped.

All words must be at least three letters long. When a word is expanded with tiles from the pool, the added tiles may not simply be a suffix (like -S or -ING).

The game ends when all tiles are face up and no further words can be formed. Players then score according to the words they have in front of them: a 3-letter word is worth 1 point, a 4-letter word 2 points, and so on.

== Variations ==
A host of variations come from both different versions and players' house rules.

=== Scoring ===
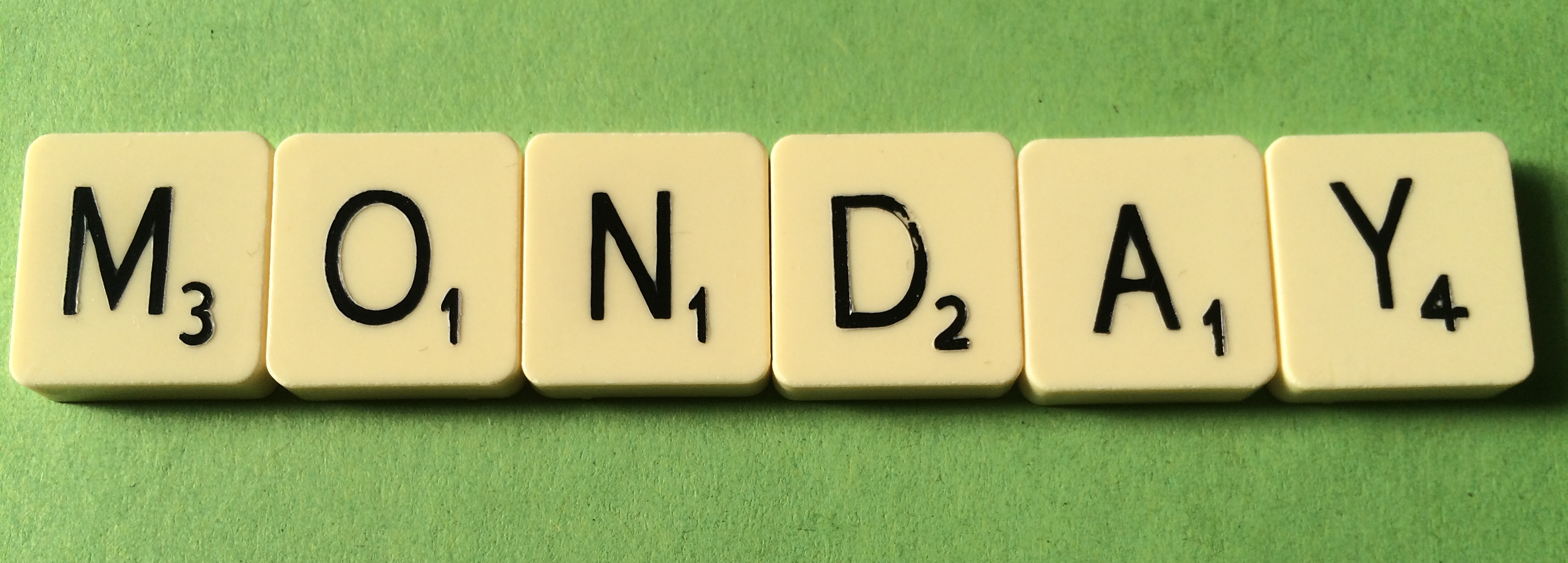
If played with Scrabble tiles, the game of Anagrams can use their letter values for scoring

Other scoring systems include:

- Simple letter count. The most tiles win.
- Simple word count. The most words win.
- Add letter point values, using Scrabble letter values.
- Remove one or two letters from each word and count the remaining tiles, rewarding longer words.
- Sum of the squares of the lengths of the words, rewarding long words more.
- The first player to spell or steal some number of (in the Selchow & Righter, eight) words wins.

=== Word length ===
The minimum acceptable word length can be adjusted to a player's skill level (for example, in a game with adults and children playing together, the children may be permitted to form four-letter words while the adults are restricted to words of at least five or six letters). Tournament Scrabble players often play with a minimum length of six or seven.

=== Turn-taking ===
In some editions of the game, such as the Milton Bradley and Selchow & Righter versions, only the player whose turn it is may form words. In the Selchow & Righter edition, a word may be stolen by any player immediately after it was made if they form a longer word with tiles from the pool.

=== National Scrabble Association ===
The National Scrabble Association has published a set of rules for competitive Anagrams play in tournament setting. On a player's turn, after revealing a tile, they have a ten-second window during which only they can call a word. If a player calls a word on their own turn they take an extra turn. After 100 turns, the order of play reverses. Minimum word length is six letters.

=== Tile banks ===
One variation is to have each player have a "bank" of tiles in front of themselves, which affords players a clearer view of the "pool" of face-up letter tiles in the middle of the table.

=== Alaskan rules ===
A faster-paced version—sometimes known as "Alaskan rules"—has each of the players (or several, if there are too many) simultaneously put a tile into the pool. This results in many more possibilities being available at a time.

=== Miscellaneous variations ===
Players may not create a word by creating a word that is already on the table or steal one resulting in such a word.

Some versions of the game name the winner as the person who, after the round of turns has finished, first acquires eight words. If more than one player has done so, then the winner is the player is the one with the most tiles. There may be a tie. A very similar rule found in The Embossing Company set simply says the "first player to complete ten words, wins."

Players are permitted to combine two or more existing words with zero or more letters from the pool to create a single new word. This is often difficult in practice.

== In popular culture ==
A game of Anagrams is played in the Alfred Hitchcock 1941 thriller film Suspicion.

A game of Anagrams is played in Ira Levin's debut novel, A Kiss Before Dying.

A game of Anagrams is played in Jane Austen's 1815 novel Emma, when Frank Churchill uses scrambled words to communicate with Jane Fairfax.

== Letter distribution ==
There are many variants: the standard letter distribution of 188 letters (given in the Rust Hills article), a 220-letter variant, and a 180-letter variant for Scrabble Scoring Anagrams are as follows:

| Variant | Letters | A | B | C | D | E | F | G | H | I | J | K | L | M | N | O | P | Q | R | S | T | U | V | W | X | Y | Z |
|---|---|---|---|---|---|---|---|---|---|---|---|---|---|---|---|---|---|---|---|---|---|---|---|---|---|---|---|
| Rust Hills article | 188 | 13 | 5 | 6 | 7 | 24 | 6 | 7 | 6 | 12 | 2 | 2 | 8 | 8 | 11 | 15 | 4 | 2 | 12 | 10 | 10 | 6 | 2 | 4 | 2 | 2 | 2 |
| | 220 | 14 | 6 | 6 | 8 | 20 | 6 | 8 | 10 | 14 | 4 | 4 | 8 | 8 | 12 | 14 | 6 | 4 | 12 | 12 | 14 | 10 | 4 | 8 | 2 | 4 | 2 |
| Scrabble Scoring Anagrams | 180 | 16 | 4 | 4 | 8 | 22 | 4 | 6 | 6 | 14 | 2 | 2 | 8 | 4 | 10 | 14 | 4 | 2 | 12 | 8 | 10 | 8 | 2 | 2 | 2 | 4 | 2 |

== See also ==
- Anatree
