= List of forms of wordplay =

This is a list of techniques used in wordplay.

Techniques that involve the phonetic values of words

- Engrish
- Chinglish
- Homonym: words with the same sounds and same spellings but with different meanings
- Homograph: words with the same spellings but with different meanings
- Homophone: words with the same sounds but with different meanings
- Homophonic translation
- Mondegreen: a mishearing (usually unintentional) as a homophone or near-homophone that has as a result acquired a new meaning. The term is often used to refer specifically to mishearing song lyrics (cf. soramimi).
- Onomatopoeia: a word or a grouping of words that imitates the sound it is describing
- Rhyme: a repetition of identical or similar sounds in two or more different words
  - Alliteration: matching consonants sounds at the beginning of words
  - Assonance: matching vowel sounds
  - Consonance: matching consonant sounds
  - Holorime: a rhyme that encompasses an entire line or phrase
- Spoonerism: a switch of two sounds in two different words (cf. sananmuunnos)
- Same-sounding words or phrases, fully or approximately homophonous (sometimes also referred to as "oronyms")

Techniques that involve the letters

- Acronym: abbreviations formed by combining the initial components in a phrase or names
- Anadrome: a word or phrase that reads as a different word or phrase in reverse
- Apronym: an acronym that is also a phrase pertaining to the original meaning
  - RAS syndrome: repetition of a word by using it both as a word alone and as a part of the acronym
  - Recursive acronym: an acronym that has the acronym itself as one of its components
- Acrostic: a writing in which the first letter, syllable, or word of each line can be put together to spell out another message
  - Mesostic: a writing in which a vertical phrase intersects lines of horizontal text
  - Word square: a series of letters arranged in the form of a square that can be read both vertically and horizontally
- Backronym: a phrase back-formed by treating a word that is originally not an initialism or acronym as one
  - Replacement Backronym: a phrase back-formed from an existing initialism or acronym that is originally an abbreviation with another meaning
- Anagram: rearranging the letters of a word or phrase to produce a new word or phrase
  - Ambigram: a word which can be read just as well mirrored or upside down
  - Blanagram: rearranging the letters of a word or phrase and substituting one single letter to produce a new word or phrase
  - Letter bank: using the letters from a certain word or phrase as many times as wanted to produce a new word or phrase
  - Jumble: a kind of word game in which the solution of a puzzle is its anagram
- Chronogram: a phrase or sentence in which some letters can be interpreted as numerals and rearranged to stand for a particular date
- Gramogram: a word or sentence in which the names of the letters or numerals are used to represent the word
- Lipogram: a writing in which certain letter is missing
  - Univocalic: a type of poetry that uses only one vowel
- Palindrome: a word or phrase that reads the same in either direction
- Pangram: a sentence which uses every letter of the alphabet at least once
- Tautogram: a phrase or sentence in which every word starts with the same letter
- Caesar shift: moving all the letters in a word or sentence some fixed number of positions down the alphabet

Techniques that involve semantics and the choosing of words

- Anglish: a writing using exclusively words of Germanic origin
- Auto-antonym: a word that contains opposite meanings
- Autogram: a sentence that provides an inventory of its own characters
- Irony
- Malapropism: incorrect usage of a word by substituting a similar-sounding word with a different meaning
- Neologism: creating new words
  - Phono-semantic matching: camouflaged/pun borrowing in which a foreign word is matched with a phonetically and semantically similar pre-existent native word (related to folk etymology)
  - Portmanteau: a new word that fuses two words or morphemes
  - Retronym: creating a new word to denote an old object or concept whose original name has come to be used for something else
- Oxymoron: a combination of two contradictory terms
- Zeugma and Syllepsis: the use of a single phrase in two ways simultaneously
- Pun: deliberately mixing two similar-sounding words
- Slang: the use of informal words or expressions

Techniques that involve the manipulation of the entire sentence or passage

- Dog Latin
- Language game: a system of manipulating spoken words to render them incomprehensible to the untrained ear
  - Pig Latin
  - Ubbi dubbi
- Non sequiturs: a conclusion or statement that does not logically follow from the previous argument or statement

Techniques that involve the formation of a name

- Ananym: a name with reversed letters of an existing name
- Aptronym: a name that aptly represents a person or character
- Charactonym: a name which suggests the personality traits of a fictional character
- Eponym: applying a person's name to a place
- Pseudonym: an artificial fictitious name, used as an alternative to one's legal name
- Sobriquet: a popularized nickname

Techniques that involves figure of speech

- Conversion (word formation): a transformation of a word of one word class into another word class
- Dysphemism: intentionally using a word or phrase with a harsher tone over one with a more polite tone
- Euphemism: intentionally using a word or phrase with a more polite tone over one with a harsher tone
- Kenning: circumlocution used in Old Norse and Icelandic poetry
- Paraprosdokian: a sentence whose latter part is surprising or unexpected in a way that causes the reader or listener to re-frame the first part

Others

- Aleatory
- Bushism
- Constrained writing
- Rebus
- Interlanguages, Mixed languages and Macaronic languages
- Sarcasm
- Tmesis

== See also ==
- Figure of speech
- Logology
- Word game
- Wit
