= Ex Libris (game) =

Literary bluffing game

Ex Libris: The Game of First Lines and Last Words is a party game of literary bluff related to fictionary. First published in 1991 by the English board game company Oxford Games Ltd., Ex Libris was devised and compiled by Leslie Scott (the creator of Jenga) and designed by Sara Finch. The game involves having to write fake, but plausible, opening (or closing) sentences of genuine books in an attempt to fool fellow players into believing your words are the authentic first (or last) lines of a given book.

== Rules of play ==
The game comprises one hundred cards, each of which provide on one side, the title, author, and plot summary of a published book or short story; And, on the other, the first and last sentences of the book.

In each round, a different player takes the role of reader and reads aloud the title, author and plot summary. The other players are then required to write plausible first or last sentences for the book, handing their efforts over to the reader, who has meanwhile copied the correct line onto a similar piece of paper, which they shuffle amongst the 'fake' scripts. The reader then reads aloud all the sentences, taking care to disguise the genuine. Players vote for which line they consider to be the genuine first or last sentence.

A player receives one point for each vote received for their fake line. A player receives one point if they vote for the book's authentic first or last line. The reader receives one point if no one identifies the genuine line.

== Reviews ==
Currently endorsed by Oxford University's Bodleian Library and the British Library (London), which both receive a royalty for each game sold, Ex Libris has been described as "fantastically tricky" and "boring-sounding (but actually extremely entertaining)".

A similar game is played on Richard Osman's House of Games.
