= Anagram =

Word or phrase rearranged from another

Animation for the anagram "Listen = Silent"

An anagram is a word or phrase formed by rearranging the letters of a different word or phrase using all the original letters exactly once. For example, the word anagram itself can be rearranged into the phrase "nag a ram"; which is an Easter egg suggestion in Google after searching for the word "anagram".

The original word or phrase is known as the subject of the anagram. Any word or phrase that exactly reproduces the letters in another order is an anagram. Someone who creates anagrams may be called an "anagrammatist", and the goal of a serious or skilled anagrammatist is to produce anagrams that reflect or comment on their subject.

== Examples ==
An animation for the anagram "President Obama = a baptism redone"

Anagrams may be created as a commentary on the subject. They may be a parody, a criticism or satire. For example:

- "New York Times" = "monkeys write"
- "Church of Scientology" = "rich-chosen goofy cult"
- "McDonald's restaurants" = "Uncle Sam's standard rot"

An anagram that is a synonym of the original word or phrase is referred to as an "aptagram". For example:

- "evil" = "vile"
- "a gentleman" = "elegant man"
- "silent" = "listen"
- "eleven plus two" = "twelve plus one"
- "angered" = "enraged"
- "the eyes" = "they see"

An anagram that has a meaning opposed to that of the original word or phrase is called an "antigram". For example:

- "restful" = "fluster"
- "cheater" = "teacher"
- "funeral" = "real fun"
- "adultery" = "true lady"
- "forty five" = "over fifty"
- "Santa" = "Satan"

They can sometimes change from a proper noun or personal name into an appropriate sentence:

- "William Shakespeare" = "I am a weakish speller"
- "Madam Curie" = "Radium came"
- "George Bush" = "He bugs Gore"
- "Tom Marvolo Riddle" = "I am Lord Voldemort"
- "Jim Morrison" = "Mr Mojo Risin"
- "The Morse code" = "Here come dots"
- "Alec Guinness" = "Genuine Class"
- "John Gielgud" = "Jiggle Hound"

"Anagrams" itself can be anagrammatized as "Ars magna" (Latin, 'the great art').

== History ==
Anagrams can be traced back to the time of the ancient Greeks, and were used to find the hidden and mystical meaning in names. They were popular throughout Europe during the Middle Ages, for example with the poet and composer Guillaume de Machaut. They are said to date back at least to the Greek poet Lycophron, in the third century BCE; but this relies on an account of Lycophron given by John Tzetzes in the 12th century.

In the Talmudic and Midrashic literature, anagrams were used to interpret the Hebrew Bible, notably by Eleazar of Modi'im. Later, Kabbalists took this up with enthusiasm, calling anagrams temurah.

Anagrams in Latin were considered witty over many centuries. Est vir qui adest, explained below, was cited as the example in Samuel Johnson's A Dictionary of the English Language. They became hugely popular in the early modern period, especially in Germany.

Any historical material on anagrams must always be interpreted in terms of the assumptions and spellings that were current for the language in question. In particular, spelling in English only slowly became fixed. There were attempts to regulate anagram formation, an important one in English being that of George Puttenham's Of the Anagram or Posy Transposed in The Art of English Poesie (1589).

=== Influence of Latin ===
As a literary game when Latin was the common property of the literate, Latin anagrams were prominent. Two examples are the change of Ave Maria, gratia plena, Dominus tecum (Latin: Hail Mary, full of grace, the Lord [is] with you) into Virgo serena, pia, munda et immaculata (Latin: Serene virgin, pious, clean and spotless), and the anagrammatic answer to Pilate's question, Quid est veritas? (Latin: What is truth?), namely, Est vir qui adest (Latin: It is the man who is here). The origins of these are not documented.

Latin continued to influence letter values (such as I = J, U = V and W = VV). There was an ongoing tradition of allowing anagrams to be "perfect" if the letters were all used once, but allowing for these interchanges. This can be seen in a popular Latin anagram against the Jesuits: Societas Jesu turned into Vitiosa seces (Latin: Cut off the wicked things). Puttenham, in the time of Elizabeth I, wished to start from Elissabet Anglorum Regina (Latin: Elizabeth Queen of the English), to obtain Multa regnabis ense gloria (Latin: By thy sword shalt thou reign in great renown); he explains carefully that H is "a note of aspiration only and no letter", and that Z in Greek or Hebrew is a mere SS. The rules were not completely fixed in the 17th century. William Camden in his Remains commented, singling out some letters—Æ, K, W, and Z—not found in the classical Roman alphabet:

The precise in this practice strictly observing all the parts of the definition, are only bold with H either in omitting or retaining it, for that it cannot challenge the right of a letter. But the Licentiats somewhat licentiously, lest they should prejudice poetical liberty, will pardon themselves for doubling or rejecting a letter, if the sence fall aptly, and "think it no injury to use E for Æ; V for W; S for Z, and C for K, and contrariwise.

— William Camden, Remains

=== Early modern period ===
When it comes to the 17th century and anagrams in English or other languages, there is a great deal of documented evidence of learned interest. The lawyer Thomas Egerton was praised through the anagram gestat honorem ('he carries honor'); the physician George Ent took the anagrammatic motto genio surget ('he rises through spirit/genius'), which requires his first name as Georgius. James I's courtiers discovered in "James Stuart" "a just master", and converted "Charles James Stuart" into "Claims Arthur's seat" (even at that point in time, the letters I and J were more-or-less interchangeable). Walter Quin, tutor to the future Charles I, worked hard on multilingual anagrams on the name of father James. A notorious murder scandal, the Overbury case, threw up two imperfect anagrams that were aided by typically loose spelling and were recorded by Simonds D'Ewes: "Francis Howard" (for Frances Carr, Countess of Somerset, her maiden name spelled in a variant) became "Car findes a whore", with the letters E hardly counted, and the victim Thomas Overbury, as "Thomas Overburie", was written as "O! O! a busie murther" (an old form of "murder"), with a V counted as U.

William Drummond of Hawthornden, in an essay On the Character of a Perfect Anagram, tried to lay down rules for permissible substitutions (such as S standing for Z) and letter omissions. William Camden provided a definition of "Anagrammatisme" as "a dissolution of a name truly written into his letters, as his elements, and a new connection of it by artificial transposition, without addition, subtraction or change of any letter, into different words, making some perfect sense appliable (i.e., applicable) to the person named." Dryden in MacFlecknoe disdainfully called the pastime the "torturing of one poor word ten thousand ways".

"Eleanor Audeley", wife of Sir John Davies, is said to have been brought before the High Commission in 1634 for extravagances, stimulated by the discovery that her name could be transposed to "Reveale, O Daniel" and to have been laughed out of court by another anagram submitted by Sir John Lambe, the dean of the Arches, "Dame Eleanor Davies", "Never soe mad a ladie".

An example from France was a flattering anagram for Cardinal Richelieu, comparing him to Hercules or at least one of his hands (Hercules being a kingly symbol), where Armand de Richelieu became Ardue main d'Hercule ("difficult hand of Hercules").

=== Modern period ===
Examples from the 19th century are the transposition of "Horatio Nelson" into Honor est a Nilo (Latin: Honor is from the Nile); and of "Florence Nightingale" into "Flit on, cheering angel". The Victorian love of anagramming as recreation is alluded to by the mathematician Augustus De Morgan using his own name as an example; "Great Gun, do us a sum!" is attributed to his son William De Morgan, but a family friend John Thomas Graves was prolific, and a manuscript with over 2,800 has been preserved.

In the novel Iracema, published by Brazilian novelist José de Alencar in 1865, the titular character is a Native Brazilian woman whose name is an anagram of "America", which in Portuguese can also refer to the Americas as a continent.

With the advent of surrealism as a poetic movement, anagrams regained the artistic respect they had had in the Baroque period. The German poet Unica Zürn, who made extensive use of anagram techniques, came to regard obsession with anagrams as a "dangerous fever", because it created isolation of the author. The surrealist leader André Breton coined the anagram Avida Dollars for Salvador Dalí, to tarnish his reputation by the implication of commercialism.

Anagrams are also known to be intentionally used as names for music acts, as acknowledged by musicians or their managers. According to American pop rock band Imagine Dragons, their name is an anagram for a phrase only known to members of the group, which lead vocalist and founding member Dan Reynolds stated each member approved of. One of the possible anagrams of their band's name is "Ragged Insomnia", which is the name of their recording studio in Las Vegas. The name of South Korean girl group Le Sserafim is an anagram of the phrase "I'm fearless". This practice is also done by solo musicians, such as American singer Ashley Nicolette Frangipane, known professionally as Halsey, which is an anagram of her first name.

== Applications ==
While anagramming is certainly a recreation first, there are ways in which anagrams are put to use, and these can be more serious, or at least not quite frivolous and formless. For example, psychologists use anagram-oriented tests, often called "anagram solution tasks", to assess the implicit memory of young adults and adults alike.

=== Establishment of priority ===
Natural philosophers (astronomers and others) of the 17th century transposed their discoveries into Latin anagrams, to establish their priority. In this way they laid claim to new discoveries before their results were ready for publication.

Galileo used smaismrmilmepoetaleumibunenugttauiras for Altissimum planetam tergeminum observavi (Latin: I have observed the most distant planet to have a triple form) for discovering the rings of Saturn in 1610. Galileo announced his discovery that Venus had phases like the Moon in the form Haec immatura a me iam frustra leguntur oy (Latin: These immature ones have already been read in vain by me -oy), that is, when rearranged, Cynthiae figuras aemulatur Mater Amorum (Latin: The Mother of Loves [= Venus] imitates the figures of Cynthia [= the moon]). In both cases, Johannes Kepler had solved the anagrams incorrectly, assuming they were talking about the Moons of Mars (Salve, umbistineum geminatum Martia proles) and a red spot on Jupiter (Macula rufa in Jove est gyratur mathem), respectively. By coincidence, he turned out to be right about the actual objects existing.

In 1656, Christiaan Huygens, using a better telescope than those available to Galileo, figured that Galileo's earlier observations of Saturn actually meant it had a ring (Galileo's tools were only sufficient to see it as bumps) and, like Galileo, had published an anagram, aaaaaaacccccdeeeeeghiiiiiiillllmmnnnnnnnnnooooppqrrstttttuuuuu. Upon confirming his observations, three years later he revealed it to mean Annulo cingitur, tenui, plano, nusquam coherente, ad eclipticam inclinato (Latin: It [Saturn] is surrounded by a thin, flat, ring, nowhere touching, inclined to the ecliptic).

When Robert Hooke discovered Hooke's law in 1660, he first published it in anagram form, ceiiinosssttuv, for ut tensio, sic vis (Latin: as the extension, so the force).

=== Pseudonyms ===
Anagrams are connected to pseudonyms, by the fact that they may conceal or reveal, or operate somewhere in between like a mask that can establish identity. For example, Jim Morrison used an anagram of his name in the Doors song "L.A. Woman", calling himself "Mr. Mojo Risin'". The use of anagrams and fabricated personal names may be to circumvent restrictions on the use of real names, as happened in the 18th century when Edward Cave wanted to get around restrictions imposed on the reporting of the House of Commons. In a genre such as farce or parody, anagrams as names may be used for pointed and satiric effect.

Pseudonyms adopted by authors are sometimes transposed forms of their names; thus "Calvinus" becomes "Alcuinus" (here V = U) or "François Rabelais" = "Alcofribas Nasier". The name "Voltaire" of François Marie Arouet fits this pattern, and is allowed to be an anagram of "Arouet, l[e] j[eune]" (U = V, J = I) that is, "Arouet the younger". Other examples include:

- "Damon Albarn" = "Dan Abnormal"
- "Dave Barry" = "Ray Adverb"
- "Arrigo Boito" = "Tobia Gorrio"
- "Buckethead" = "Death Cube K"
- "Daniel Clowes" = "Enid Coleslaw"
- "Marguerite (de) Crayencour" = "Marguerite Yourcenar"
- "Siobhán Donaghy" = "Shanghai Nobody"
- "Glen Duncan" = "Declan Gunn"
- "(Theodor) Geisel" = "(Theo) Le Sieg"
- "Edward Gorey" = "Ogdred Weary", = "Regera Dowdy" or = "E. G. Deadworry" (and others)
- "Anna Madrigal" = "A man and a girl"
- "Ted Morgan" = "(Sanche) de Gramont"
- "Vladimir Nabokov" = "Vivian Darkbloom", = "Vivian Bloodmark", = "Blavdak Vinomori", or = "Dorian Vivalkomb"

Several of these are "imperfect anagrams", letters having been left out in some cases for the sake of easy pronunciation.

=== Titles ===
Anagrams used for titles afford scope for some types of wit. Examples:

- Homer Hickam's book Rocket Boys was adapted into the 1999 film October Sky.
- The tapes for the revival of the BBC show Doctor Who were labeled with the anagram Torchwood, which later went on to be used as the name for a spin-off show. In multi-episode shows, the program occasionally substitutes the anagram of an actor's name for the actual name to prevent revealing the true identity of the role (for instance, The Master) being played by the actor.
- The New Wave band Missing Persons' best-selling album was called Spring Session M.
- Hip-hop artist MF Doom recorded a 2004 album called Mm..Food.
- Brian Eno's album Before and After Science includes a song entitled "King's Lead Hat", an anagram of "Talking Heads", a band Eno has worked with.
- Juan Maria Solare's piano ballad "Jura ser anomalía" (literally "he/she swears to be an anomaly") is an anagram of the composer's full name. His composition for English horn titled "A Dot in Time" is an anagram of "Meditation", which describes the piece. The title of his piano piece that is a homage to Claude Debussy is "Seduce Us Badly".
- Bill Evans's overdubbed piano elegy for fellow jazz pianist Sonny Clark is titled "N.Y.C.'s No Lark", and another composition, "Re: Person I Knew" is a tribute to his producer, Orrin Keepnews.
- The title of Imogen Heap's album iMegaphone is an anagram of her name.
- Progressive rock group Rush published a song on their 1989 album Presto titled "Anagram (for Mongo)" that makes use of anagrams in every line of the song.
- The title of the fifth album by the American rock band Interpol, El Pintor, is an anagram of the band's name and also Spanish for "the painter".
- Many of the song titles on Aphex Twin's ...I Care Because You Do are anagrams of either "Aphex Twin", "The Aphex Twin", or "Richard D. James".
- In Disney's 1964 film Mary Poppins, Dick Van Dyke played Mr. Dawes Sr. as the anagram of his name, Navckid Keyd. In the credits, the words unscrambled themselves to reveal his name.
- The title of King Crimson's 1982 song "Thela Hun Ginjeet" is an anagram of "heat in the jungle".
- The titles of two albums released in 2022 by Australian rock band King Gizzard & the Lizard Wizard, Made in Timeland and Laminated Denim, are anagrams of each other.

=== Coincidences ===
In Hebrew, the name "Gernot Zippe" (גרנוט ציפה), the inventor of the Zippe-type centrifuge, is an anagram of the word "centrifuge" (צנטריפוגה).

=== Games and puzzles ===
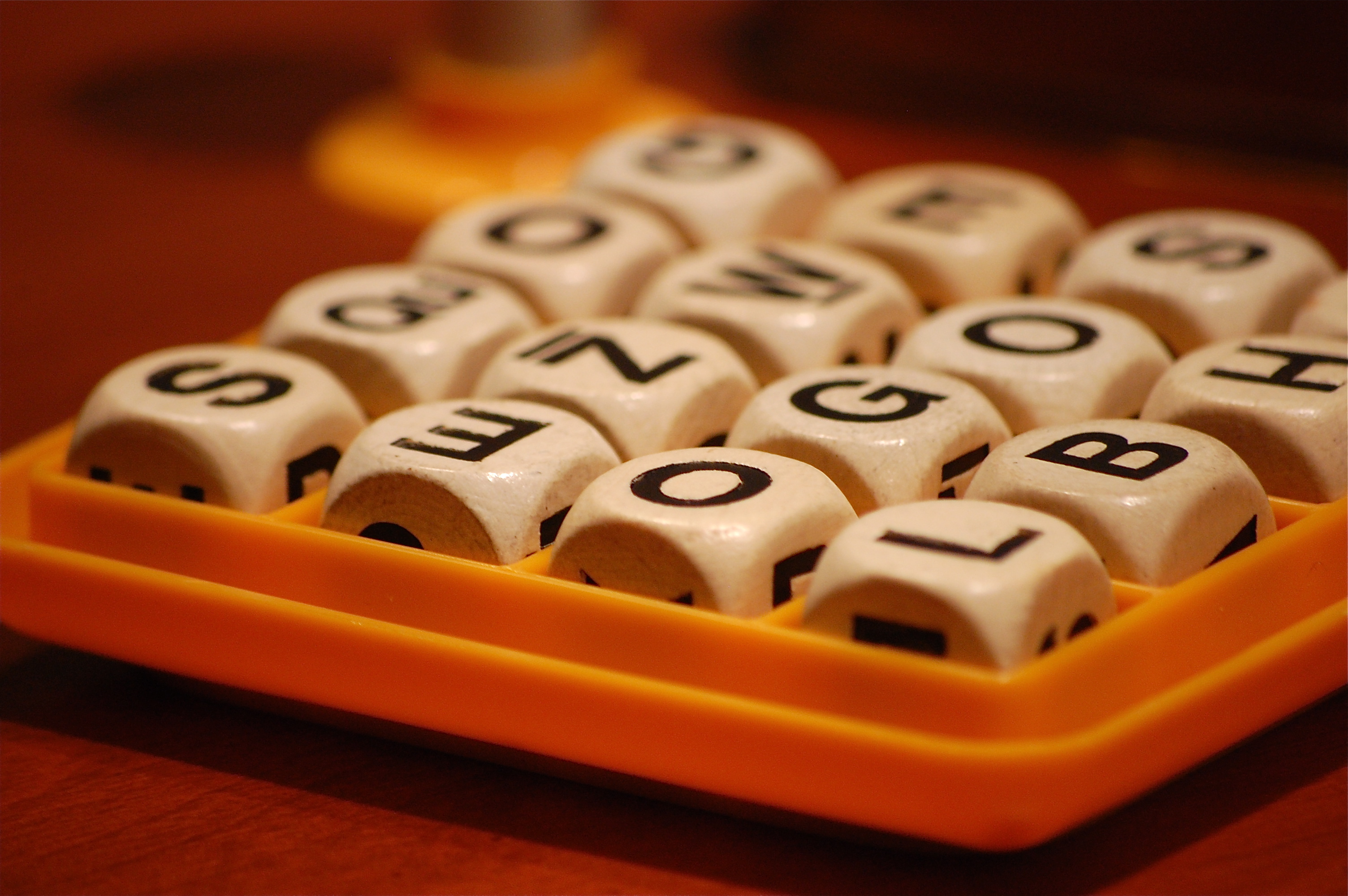
The game of Boggle

Anagrams are in themselves a recreational activity, but they also make up part of many other games, puzzles and game shows. The Jumble is a puzzle found in many newspapers in the United States requiring the unscrambling of letters to find the solution. Cryptic crossword puzzles frequently use anagrammatic clues, usually indicating that they are anagrams by the inclusion of a descriptive term like "confused" or "in disarray". An example would be Businessman burst into tears (9 letters). The solution, stationer, is an anagram of into tears, the letters of which have burst out of their original arrangement to form the name of a type of businessman.

Numerous other games and contests involve some element of anagram formation as a basic skill. Some examples:

- In Anagrams, players flip tiles over one at a time and race to take words. They can "steal" each other's words by rearranging the letters and extending the words.
- In a version of Scrabble called Clabbers, the name itself is an anagram of Scrabble. Tiles may be placed in any order on the board as long as they anagram to a valid word.
- On the British game show Countdown, contestants are given 30 seconds to make the longest word from nine random letters.
- In Boggle, players make constrained words from a grid of sixteen random letters, by joining adjacent cubes.
- On the British game show BrainTeaser, contestants are shown a word broken into randomly arranged segments and must announce the whole word. At the end of the game there is a "Pyramid" which starts with a three-letter word. A letter appears in the line below to which the player must add the existing letters to find a solution. The pattern continues until the player reaches the final eight-letter anagram. The player wins the game by solving all the anagrams within the allotted time.
- In Bananagrams, players place tiles from a pool into crossword-style word arrangements in a race to see who can finish the pool of tiles first.

=== Ciphers ===
Multiple anagramming is a technique used to solve some kinds of cryptograms, such as a permutation cipher, a transposition cipher, and the Jefferson disk. Solutions may be computationally found using a Jumble algorithm.

== Methods of construction ==
Sometimes, it is possible to "see" anagrams in words, unaided by tools, though the more letters involved the more difficult this becomes. The difficulty is that for a word of n different letters, there are n! (factorial of n) different permutations and so n! − 1 different anagrams of the word. Anagram dictionaries can also be used. Computer programs, known as "anagram search", "anagram servers", and "anagram solvers", among other names, offer a much faster route to creating anagrams, and a large number of these programs are available on the Internet. Some programs use the Anatree algorithm to compute anagrams efficiently.

The program or server carries out an exhaustive search of a database of words, to produce a list containing every possible combination of words or phrases from the input word or phrase using a jumble algorithm. Some programs (such as Lexpert) restrict to one-word answers. Many anagram servers (for example, The Words Oracle) can control the search results, by excluding or including certain words, limiting the number or length of words in each anagram, or limiting the number of results. Anagram solvers are often banned from online anagram games. The disadvantage of computer anagram solvers, especially when applied to multi-word anagrams, is their poor understanding of the meaning of the words they are manipulating. They usually cannot filter out meaningful or appropriate anagrams from large numbers of nonsensical word combinations. Some servers attempt to improve on this using statistical techniques that try to combine only words that appear together often. This approach provides only limited success since it fails to recognize ironic and humorous combinations.

Some anagrammatists indicate the method they used. Anagrams constructed without the aid of a computer are noted as having been done "manually" or "by hand"; those made by utilizing a computer may be noted "by machine" or "by computer", or may indicate the name of the computer program (using Anagram Genius).

There are also a few "natural" instances: English words unconsciously created by switching letters around. The French chaise longue ("long chair") became the American "chaise lounge" by metathesis (transposition of letters and/or sounds). It has also been speculated that the English "curd" comes from the Latin crudus ("raw"). Similarly, the ancient English word for bird was "brid".

== Notable anagrammatists ==
The French king Louis XIII had a man named Thomas Billon appointed as his Royal Anagrammatist with an annual salary of 1,200 livres. Among contemporary anagrammers, Anu Garg, created an Internet Anagram Server in 1994 together with the satirical anagram-based newspaper The Anagram Times. Mike Keith has anagrammed the complete text of Moby Dick. He, along with Richard Brodie, has published The Anagrammed Bible that includes anagrammed version of many books of the Bible. Popular television personality Dick Cavett is known for his anagrams of famous celebrities such as Alec Guinness and Spiro Agnew.

== See also ==
- Acronym
- Ambigram
- Anagrammatic poem
- Anagrams, a board game
- Ananym
- Blanagram
- Constrained writing
- Isogram
- Letter bank
- Lipogram
- List of geographic anagrams and ananyms
- List of taxa named by anagrams
- London Underground anagram map
- Palindrome
- Pangram
- Rebus
- Sator Square
- Spoonerism
- Tautonym
- Word play
