= Oxford Games =

Oxford Games Ltd, incorporated in 1991, is an English board game company.

== History ==
Founded by Leslie Scott (the creator of Jenga), and the graphic designer, Sara Finch. Finch & Scott co-designed Swipe and The Great Western Railway Game (published by Gibsons Games) in 1985, and then went on to develop and design almost forty games together. Most were published and marketed through Oxford Games Ltd, though there were several that were designed to commission for other companies such as Past Times, and still others that were endorsed by institutions, such as the Ashmolean Museum.

== Oxford Games ==
The collection of games published by the company comprises over thirty games, including

- Ex Libris, endorsed by the Bodleian Library and the British Library
- Anagram
- Tabula
- Bookworm, endorsed by the Bodleian Library
- Playing Shakespeare, endorsed by the Royal Shakespeare Company
- The Game of Garden Maze
- Inspiration, endorsed by the Fitzwilliam Museum
- The Hieroglyphs Game, endorsed by the Ashmolean Museum
