= London Underground anagram map =

Parody of the London Underground map

London Underground anagram map is a parody map of the London Underground with the station and line names replaced with anagrams. The anagram map was circulated on the web in February 2006.

== Controversy ==
The map was featured on thousands of blogs before a Transport for London lawyer requested that the map be removed. It inspired some people to create anagram versions of their hometown's metro system with similar legal repercussions. The fact that it was appreciated internationally, despite some not knowing the stations behind the anagrams, is a recognition of Harry Beck's iconic Tube map design.

== Origin of the anagram map ==
The map was created by 'Barry Heck' using a photoshopped Tube map and an online anagram generator, on 7 February 2006. It was originally shown in a thread on the Thingbox chat forum and, after being submitted by one of the site owners, appeared on BoingBoing a couple of days later receiving 31,000 hits within the next six days. (The name Barry Heck is a pseudonym chosen because it is an anagram and spoonerism of Harry Beck.)

The idea came from The Great Bear, a 1992 artwork by UK artist Simon Patterson on display at Tate Modern in London, but it was not until Dorian Lynskey's music genre tube map appeared in a newspaper in 2006 that Barry Heck decided to make it.

In 2000, Scottish artist Mark Campbell created the Glasgow Anagram Tour which involved a large light box anagram map of Glasgow and Pop-out Maps with anagrams of Glasgow's cultural establishments which were for sale to commemorate Scotland's Year of the Artist 2000.

Transport for London claimed the image was a copyright infringement and had one of their lawyers ask for the map to be removed from the web. The site hosting it complied and it was removed on 22 February 2006 with the action being reported on BoingBoing again.

Transport for London also censored other websites that hosted the image such as the www.geofftech.co.uk site. But an online backlash against TFL's lawyers meant that many other websites made mirrors of Geoff's page, thus resulting in more copies of tube map "mash-ups" on the internet.

The owner of the site – Geoff Marshall, was interviewed on BBC Radio 5 Live by Chris Vallance about "map-mashing" (making parody maps) in which the London Underground anagram map was discussed. This was broadcast on 14 March 2006.

== Blogging ==
BoingBoing has reported that Washington, Toronto, Amsterdam, Chicago, Oslo, Boston, New York City, Atlanta, Sydney, and Vienna had anagram maps created for their metro systems, inspired by the London map.

The anagram map was featured in thousands of blogs and its progress can be tracked at Technorati.com. Because of similarities with Neverwhere it was mentioned in the letters page of author Neil Gaiman's blog, with his fanbase ensuring over 1,700 others linked to it. But nearly 21,000 other blogs linked to BoingBoing's article alone.

== Stations not anagrammatized ==
Blackwall and Hornchurch stations could not be properly anagrammatized and instead were split into their component words and reversed to produce "Wall Black" and "Church Horn" respectively. Burch Chow/Chow Burch (from the gynaecological Burch procedure) was rejected as an anagram for Bow Church, because of a dislike for uncommon proper nouns, leaving it reversed as "Church Bow". Bank was anagrammatized into 'nabk', the edible berry of the Ziziphus lotus tree.

Not all derivatives for other cities followed this pattern. For Toronto, the impossible stations were named after streets, so the namesake's designation as "Avenue" or "Street" was appended before anagramming (Queen became Queen Street became Queerest Ten).
