= Thomas Billon =

French anagrammatist

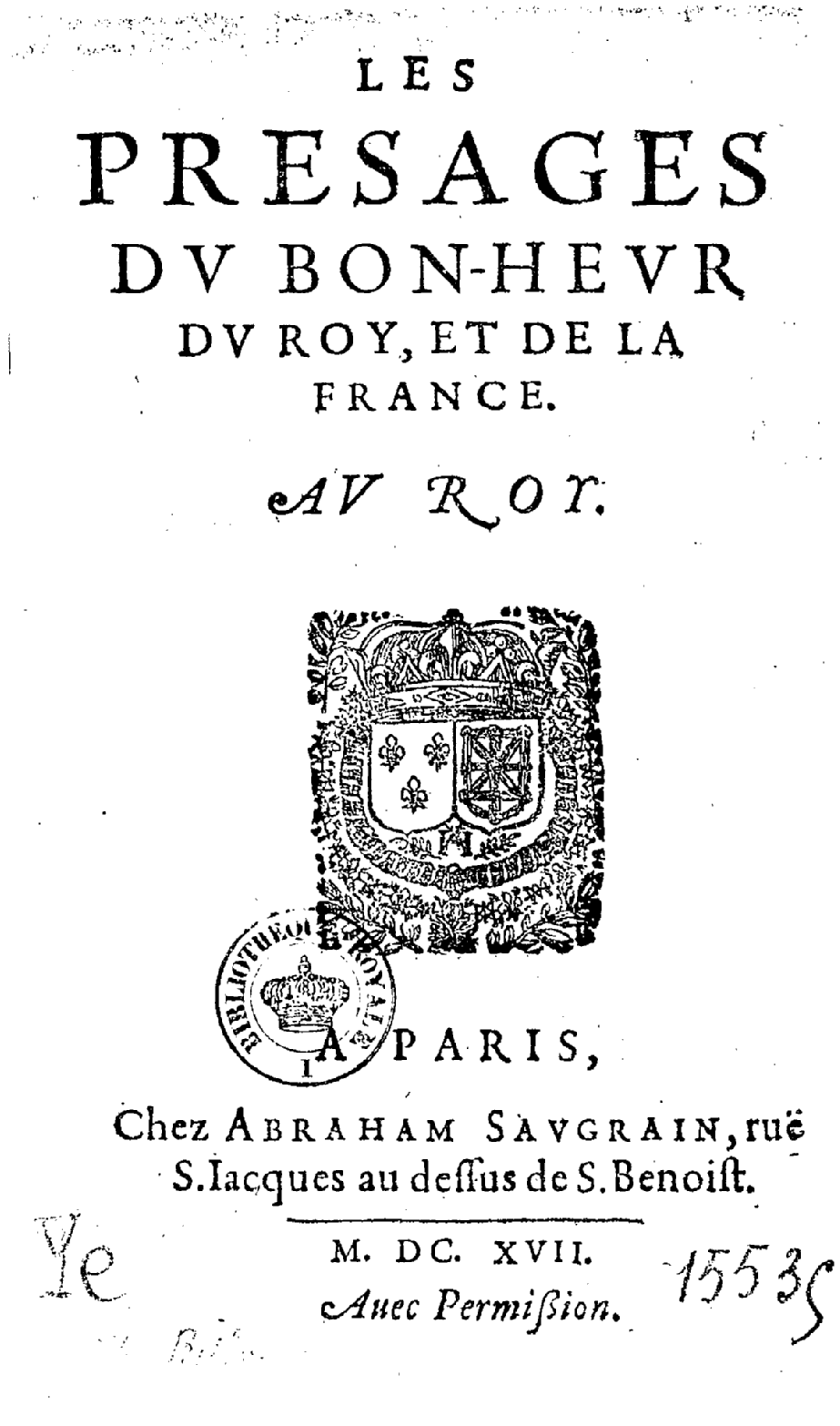
Title page for Billon's 1617 pamphlet Les presages du bon-heur du roy, et de la France.

Thomas Billon (fl. 1617–1647) was a celebrated French anagrammatist.

In 17th-century Europe, anagrams were a literary passion. In France, the Bourbon king Louis XIII appointed Billon, a Provençal, to the position of Royal Anagrammatist. His responsibilities at court were the composition of anagrammatic prophecies, and of amusing or mystical anagrams of people's names. These included numerous anagrams in French and Latin on Louis's royal style ("Louys tresiesme de bourbon roy de France et de Navarre") and various other anagrams and poems glorifying Louis and Anne of Austria, past kings of France, popes, emperors, and nearly all the Christian saints.

Billon served as Royal Anagrammatist from 1624 to 1631, and again from 1640 to 1647, and received a pension of 1200 livres.

== Bibliography ==
- Billon, Thomas (1617). Les presages du bon-heur du roy, et de la France. Paris: A. Savgrain.
- Billon, Thomas (1624). Sibylla gallica, anagrammaticis magna praedicens oraculis.
