= Blanagram =

Form of anagram

A blanagram (portmanteau of blank and anagram) is a word which is an anagram of another but for the substitution of a single letter. The term has its origin in competitive Scrabble, where a blank tile on a player's rack may be used to form any of several possible words in conjunction with the player's other tiles.

== Examples of blanagrams ==
- On the list of currently acceptable words for club and tournament Scrabble in North America (OWL2), the anagram pair EPICOTYL/LIPOCYTE has 18 blanagrams:
  - Replacing C with L or N yields POLITELY or LINOTYPE;
  - Replacing I with A or F yields CALOTYPE or COPYLEFT;
  - Replacing L with C or D yields ECOTYPIC or COPYEDIT;
  - Replacing O with H or I yields PHYLETIC or PYELITIC;
  - Replacing P with R or V yields CRYOLITE or VELOCITY;
  - Replacing T with N yields POLYENIC;
  - Replacing Y with A, H, N, R, or U yields POETICAL, CHIPOTLE/HELICOPT, LEPTONIC, LEPROTIC/PETROLIC, or POULTICE.

Note that in this case no blanagram is available by replacing the E, so EPICOTYL and LIPOCYTE are the only eight-letter words that can be formed from the Scrabble tiles CILOPTY plus a blank.

- The eight-letter word ANGRIEST (and anagrams such as GANTRIES and INGRATES) has over 100 blanagrams that are common words, and many more that are more obscure.
- The word FILMCARD has only one acceptable blanagram: FLUIDRAM. (However, some other dictionaries list other possibilities, such as FRICADEL and FILECARD).
- Turkish is a blanagram of Kurdish.
- Pangram, Tangram and Managua are blanagrams of the word anagram.

Many seven- and eight-letter words, such as KILOVOLT and QUIXOTIC, have no acceptable blanagrams; such words typically contain a subset of the letters JKQVWXZ.
