= Letter bank =

Type of anagram

A letter bank is a relative of the anagram where all the letters of one word (the "bank") can be used as many times as desired (minimum of once each) to make a new word or phrase. For example, IMPS is a bank of MISSISSIPPI and SPROUT is a bank of SUPPORT OUR TROOPS. As a convention, the bank should contain no repeated letters.

The term was coined by Will Shortz, whose first letter bank (BLUME -> BUMBLEBEE) appeared in his 1979 book, "Brain Games". In 1980, Shortz introduced letter banks to the National Puzzlers' League (of which he is the historian), in the form of a contest puzzle. In 1981, the letter bank was announced an official puzzle type in the NPL’s magazine "The Enigma".

Letter banks are the basis for the word game Alpha Blitz.
