= Wordplay =

Form of wit where words are used for special effect

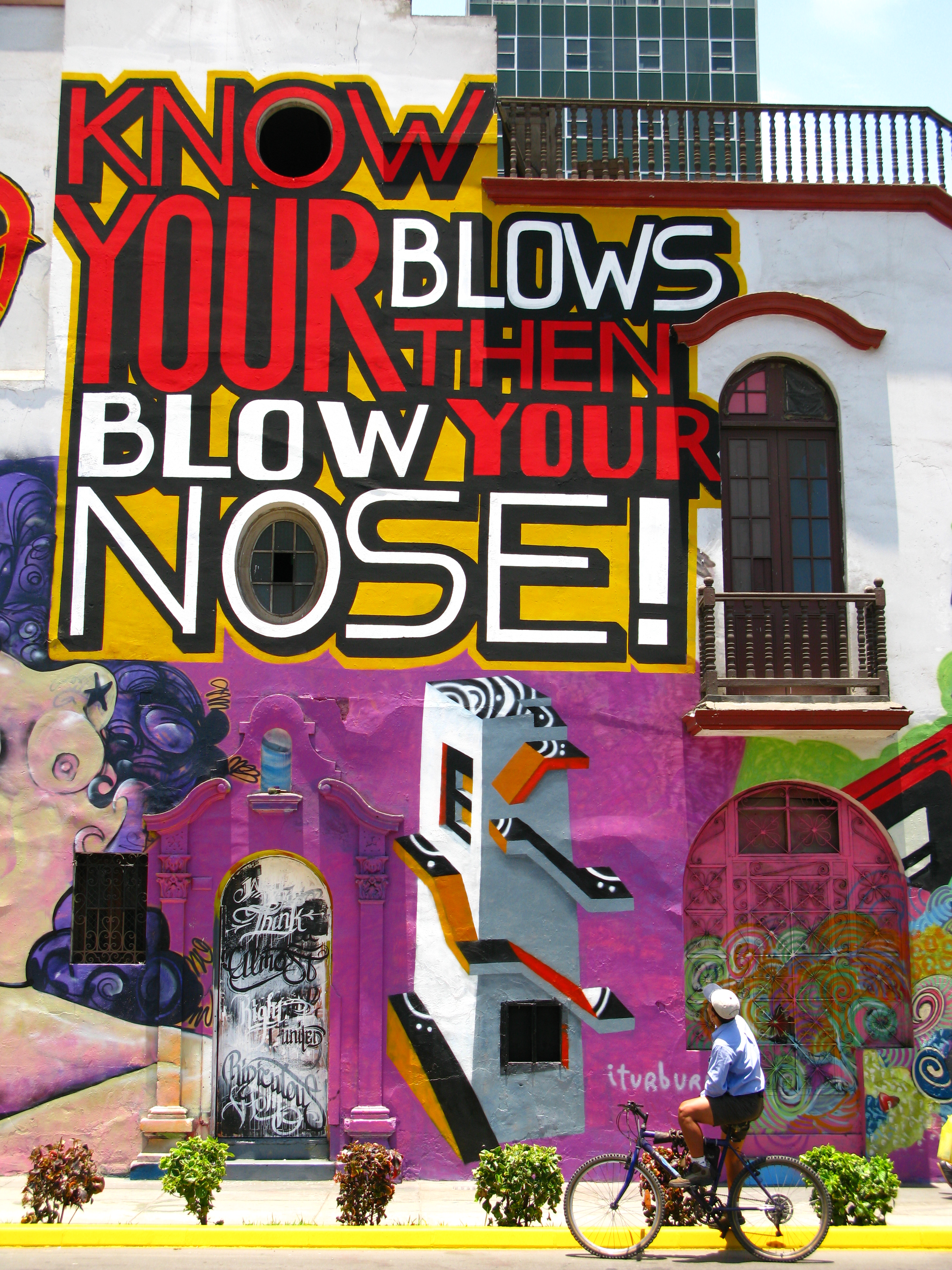
Artist Tavar Zawacki painted a site-specific wordplay painting in Lima, Peru, commenting on the cocaine crisis and exportation.

Wordplay (also: play-on-words) is a literary technique and a form of wit in which words used become the main subject of the work, primarily for the purpose of intended effect or amusement. Examples of wordplay include puns, phonetic mix-ups such as spoonerisms, obscure words and meanings, clever rhetorical excursions, oddly formed sentences, double entendres, and telling character names (such as in the play The Importance of Being Earnest, Ernest being a given name that sounds exactly like the adjective earnest).

Wordplay is quite common in oral cultures as a method of reinforcing meaning. Examples of text-based (orthographic) wordplay are found in languages with or without alphabet-based scripts, such as homophonic puns in Mandarin Chinese.

== Techniques ==
Tom Swifties
A form of humorous writing where adverbs are chosen to reflect the nature of the situation in a punning way. "Hurry up and get to the back of the ship", Tom said sternly.
Wellerisms
Using linguistic fossils and set phrases. Example: "We'll have to rehearse that", said the undertaker as the coffin fell out of the car.
Unpaired words: Deliberate use of unusual or obsolete antonyms, such as "I was well-coiffed and sheveled", (back-formation from "disheveled").
Spoonerism
An accidental and often humorous transposition of initial letters or sounds, such as "a flock of bats" instead of "a block of flats" or "a bunny phone" instead of "a funny bone".
Malapropism
Replacing a word with a different word that sounds similar, either unintentionally or for comedic effect. For example, saying "He is the very pineapple of politeness." instead of pinnacle
Anthimeria
Altering a word's regular part of speech. This can occur naturally with the evolution of a language, but can also be done for emphasis or comedic effect. For example, saying "The thunder would not peace at my bidding." using the noun peace as a verb, or "The little old lady turtled across the street."
Double entendre
Words or phrases with multiple meanings are used ambiguously with a humorous or sexual (or both) result. For example, Mae West's "Marriage is a fine institution, but I'm not ready for an institution." and the Groucho Marx line "If I said you had a beautiful body, would you hold it against me?"
Portmanteau
Combining two words to create a new word, such as smoke and fog to make smog.

== Examples ==
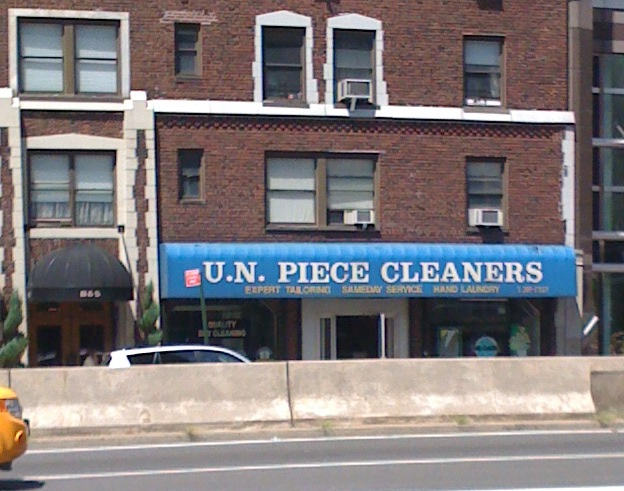
Many businesses use wordplay to their advantage by making their business names more memorable. This business is located near the United Nations Headquarters and plays on the term UN Peacekeepers.

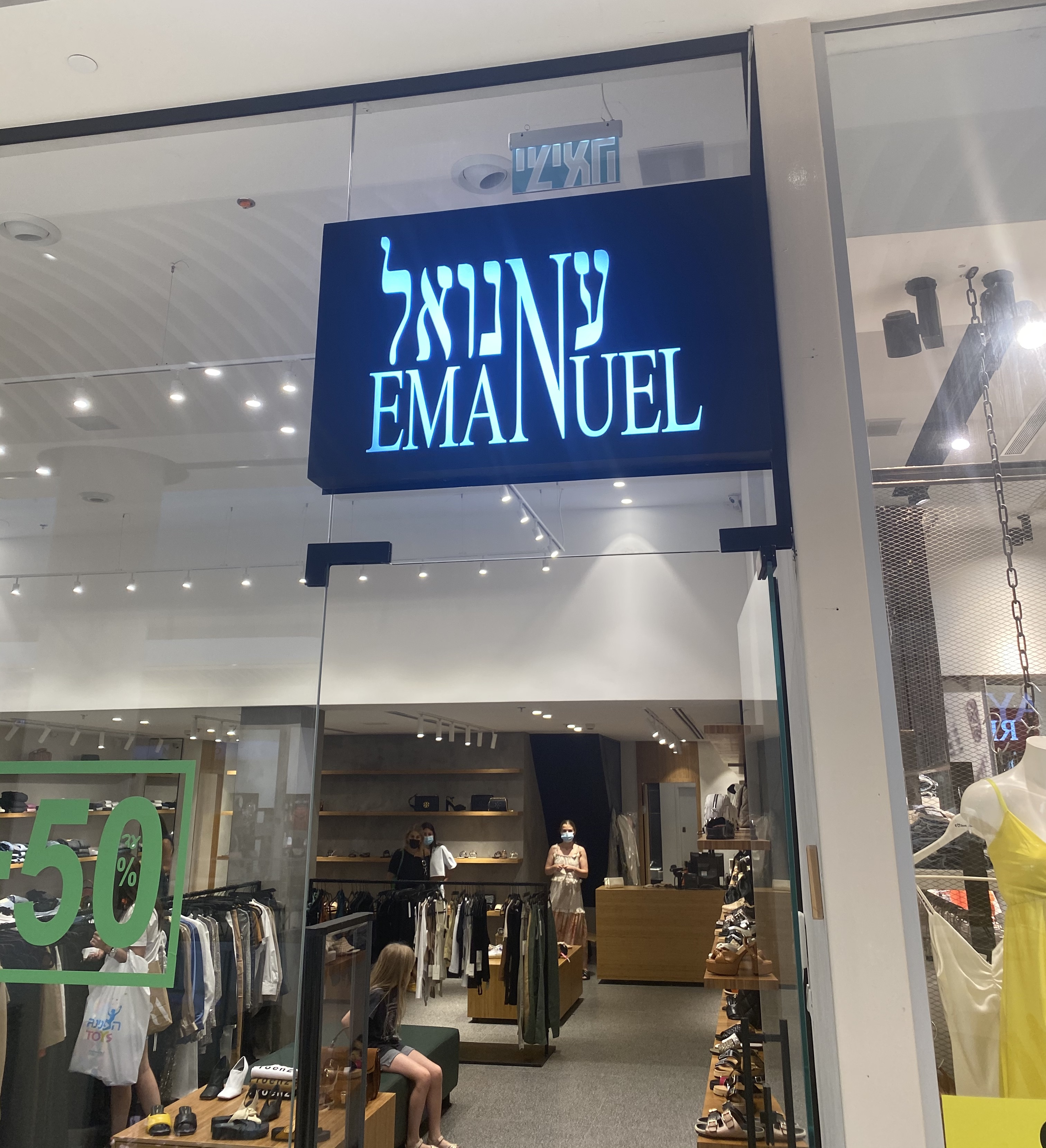
This business's sign is written in both English and Hebrew. The large character is used to make the 'N' in Emanuel and the 'מ' (cursive form) in עמנואל. This is an example of orthographic wordplay.

Most writers engage in wordplay to some extent, but certain writers are particularly committed to, or adept at, wordplay as a major feature of their work. Shakespeare's "quibbles" have made him a noted punster. Similarly, P.G. Wodehouse was hailed by The Times as a "comic genius recognized in his lifetime as a classic and an old master of farce" for his own acclaimed wordplay. James Joyce, author of Ulysses, is another noted word-player. For example, in his Finnegans Wake Joyce's phrase "they were yung and easily freudened" clearly implies the more conventional "they were young and easily frightened"; however, the former also makes an apt pun on the names of two famous psychoanalysts, Jung and Freud.

An epitaph, probably unassigned to any grave, demonstrates use in rhyme.

Here lie the bones of one 'Bun'
He was killed with a gun.
His name was not 'Bun' but 'Wood'
But 'Wood' would not rhyme with gun
But 'Bun' would.

Crossword puzzles often employ wordplay to challenge solvers. Cryptic crosswords especially are based on elaborate systems of wordplay.

An example of modern wordplay can be found on line 103 of Childish Gambino's "III. Life: The Biggest Troll".

H2O plus my D, that's my hood, I'm living in it

Rapper Milo uses a play on words in his verse on "True Nen".

Keep any heat by the fine China dinner set
Your man's caught the chill and it ain't even winter yet

A farmer says, "I got soaked for nothing, stood out there in the rain bang in the middle of my land, a complete waste of time. I'll like to kill the swine who said you can win the Nobel Prize for being out standing in your field!"

The Mario Party series is known for its mini-game titles that usually are puns and various plays on words; for example: "Shock, Drop, and Roll", "Gimme a Brake", and "Right Oar Left". These mini-game titles are also different depending on regional differences and take into account that specific region's culture.

Many of the books the character Gromit in the Wallace & Gromit series reads or the music Gromit listens to are plays on words, such as "Pup Fiction" (Pulp Fiction), "Where Beagles Dare" (Where Eagles Dare), "Red Hot Chili Puppies" (Red Hot Chili Peppers) and "The Hound of Music" (The Sound of Music).

== Related phenomena ==
Wordplay can enter common usage as neologisms.

Wordplay is closely related to word games; that is, games in which the point is manipulating words. See also language game for a linguist's variation.

Wordplay can cause problems for translators: e.g., in the book Winnie-the-Pooh a character mistakes the word "issue" for the noise of a sneeze, a resemblance which disappears when the word "issue" is translated into another language.

== See also ==
- Etymology
- False etymology
- Figure of speech
- List of forms of wordplay
- List of taxa named by anagrams
- Metaphor
- Phono-semantic matching
- Sensational spelling
- Simile
- Pun
