= Past Times =

British retail company

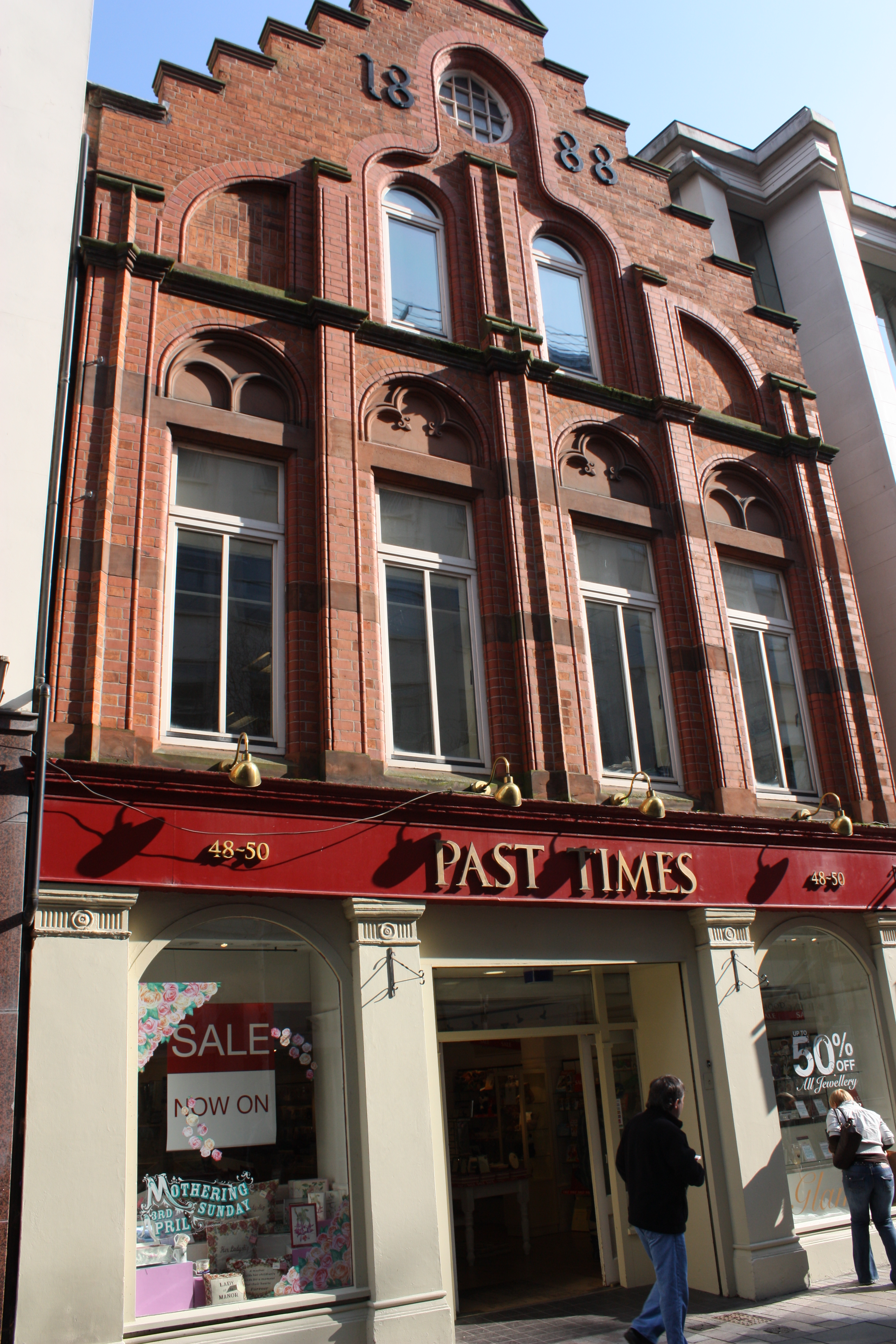
- Past Times, Belfast (2011)
- Company type: Public company
- Industry: Retail
- Founded: 1987
- Founder: John Beale
- Defunct: 2012
- Successor: WHSmith

Past Times was a United Kingdom high street retailer, specialising in gifts and retro style goods. It was established as a mail order company in 1986 by John Beale, who was also the developer of the Early Learning Centre. In June 1987, the company opened the first branch in Oxford.

The firm went into administration in January 2012 and in March 2013 the brand name was bought by WHSmith. Past Times' website was taken down following the purchase.
