= Leslie Scott (game designer) =

British board game designer and author (born 1955)

- Born: 18 December 1955 (age 70); Dar es Salaam, Tanganyika
- Occupations: Game designer, author, businesswoman
- Known for: Jenga
- Spouse: Fritz Vollrath
- Children: Frederica and Digby

Leslie Scott (born 18 December 1955) is a Tanzanian-born British board game designer, author, and businesswoman, best known as the inventor of the game Jenga. Despite initial challenges, Scott transformed a family wooden block game into the classic Jenga, achieving worldwide success after licensing to Hasbro in 1986. Recognized for her contributions, she received accolades such as the 2010 Wonder Women of Toys Inventor/Designer Award and the 2012 Tagie Award for Excellence in Game Design.

== Early life and education ==
Born in Tanzania, Scott spent her childhood in East and West African countries and completed her education in England. Her family had always enjoyed playing board games together, furthered by her father, Robert Scott, a World War II fighter pilot turned oil company executive, who designed many games and toys for her and her three siblings to play with.

One of the games that was eventually developed and played by the family while they were living in Ghana was created using wooden blocks that were scraps found by her younger brother from a sawmill near their house in Ghana. They called the game Takoradi Bricks, named after a nearby port. After moving to Oxford in 1974, she taught the game to her friends with a set of blocks she had brought along, and it became popular amongst her peers. This interest led to the introduction of the game to the market as Jenga.

== Career ==
=== Intel ===
After graduating high school, Scott began working at Intel UK, where she became the Marketing Communications Manager. She would also design a various competitive team-based puzzle-solving games that became a huge success at their international sales conferences. The creative freedom offered by her job led her to realize her entrepreneurial nature and start her own company.

=== Jenga ===
She went on to found Leslie Scott Associates, a one-woman, one-product company, and decided to turn the wooden blocks into a product and sell them. With no business plans and no experience in the toy industry, she borrowed £15,000 from the bank with the support of her mother, who placed her house as collateral.

Having grown up speaking Swahili, Scott decided to derive the game's name from the word "kujenga", meaning "to build", with the desire to have people exclusively associate the word with the game. Despite the later opposition to the name by distributors, she was resolute in her branding decision, and the name was eventually accepted and embraced by the companies and adopted by the masses to be associated with this popular game.

She also wanted to be intentional with the production of the game to offer customers a tactile experience similar to the one she had when playing the game growing up. Each of the 64 blocks needed to be slightly different from each other with a handmade feel, and no two sets were to be the same. She achieved this after a carpenter's suggestion to use a special template when sanding the wood before cutting it. She exhibited the game, then called Jenga The Perpetual Challenge, at the Earls Court Toyfair in 1982 and at the London Toy & Hobby Fair in 1983, with no success at selling the game at either exhibition.

After a few years of producing the game, which was manufactured by a wood workshop at Camphill, entrepreneur Robert Grebler discovered the game and bought the rights, later assigning worldwide rights to the distribution of the game to Pokonobe Associates in 1985, which they then licensed to Irwin Toy in 1986. Irwin Toy hated the name of the game, Jenga The Perpetual Challenge, saying that the English-speaking public would not understand the words Jenga and perpetual. Scott held fast to the name Jenga, and the name of the game was shortened to Jenga.

Irwin Toy launched the game at the Toronto Toy Fair and also advertised it on television as "the great game with the strange name". Later, in 1986, the Irwin brothers licensed Jenga to Hasbro, Inc, which propelled the game to massive success.

Meanwhile, Scott also transformed Leslie Scott Associates into Oxford Games Ltd in 1991, partnering with a designer and old friend, Sara Finch. The company had published over forty games.

=== Senior Associate at Oxford ===
She is a Senior Associate of Pembroke College, Oxford, focusing on play. She is also a founder trustee of The Smithsonian UK Charitable Trust.

== Honours ==
Scott is the recipient of the 2010 Wonder Women of Toys Inventor/Designer Award, and the 2012 Tagie award for Excellence in Game Design.

In 2020, Jenga was inducted to the National Toy Hall of Fame at The Strong National Museum of Play.

== Private life ==
Scott is married to the Oxford zoologist Professor Fritz Vollrath, who is famous for his studies on spiders. They have two children.

== Works ==
=== Games ===
- Jenga
- Ex Libris, the game of first lines and last words
- The Hieroglyphs Game, created for the Ashmolean Museum
- The Great Western Railway Game
- Anagrams, the game of juggling words
- Tabula, the Roman game
- Bookworm, the game of reading and remembering

=== Books ===
- Scott, Leslie (1 October 2009). About Jenga: The Remarkable Business of Creating a Game that Became a Household Name. Greenleaf Book Group. ISBN 978-1608320028.
