= Jenga =

Game played with a tower of blocks

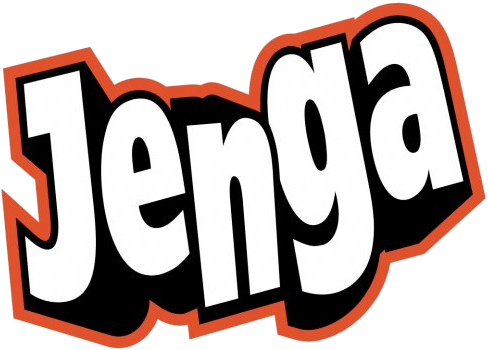
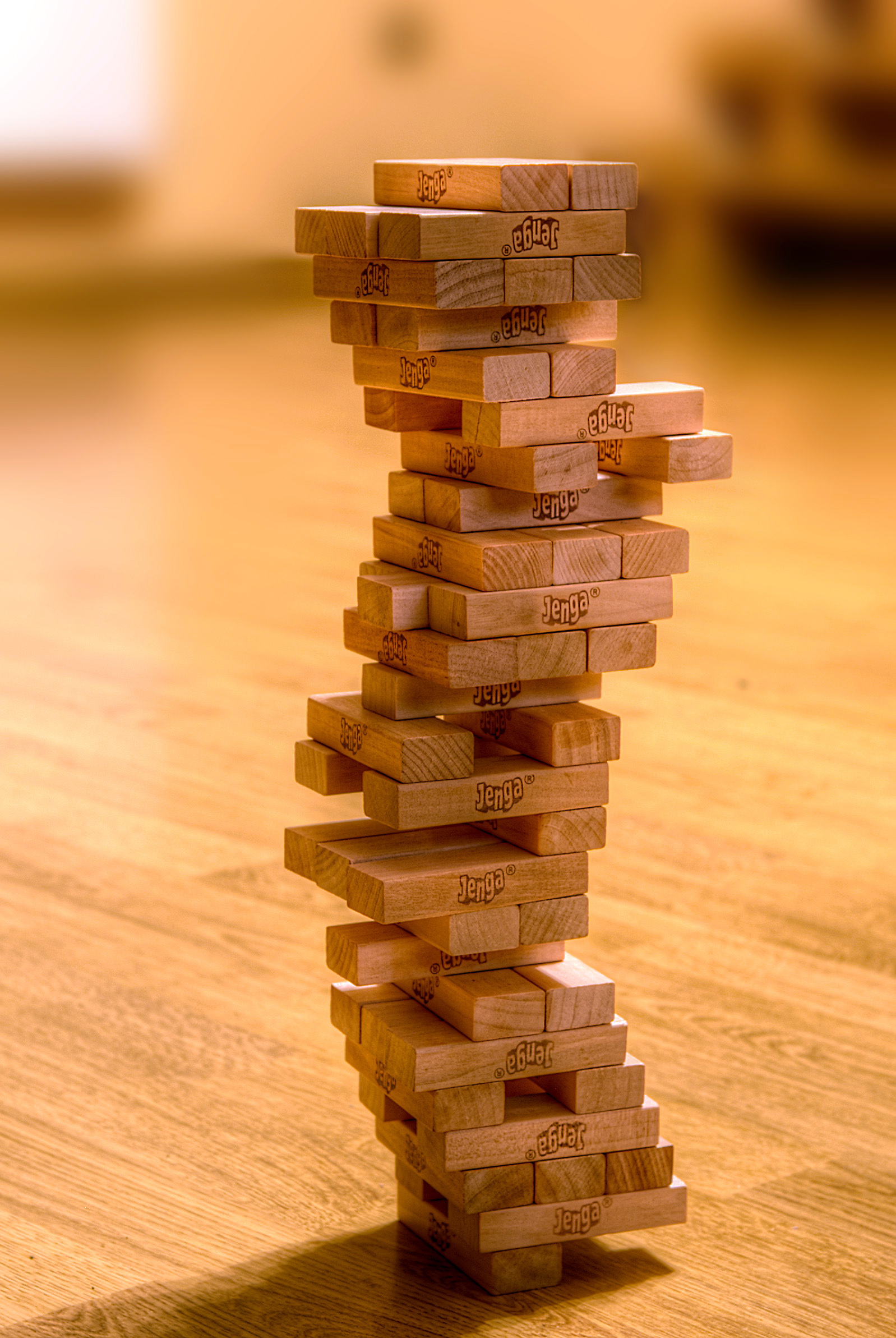
- A Jenga tower
- Designers: Leslie Scott
- Publication: 1983; 43 years ago
- Players: 1 or more
- Setup time: < 2 minutes
- Playing time: Usually 5–15 minutes
- Chance: None
- Age range: 3 and up
- Skills: Manual dexterity, eye–hand coordination, precision, and strategy
- Website: jenga.com

Jenga is a game of physical skill created by British board game designer and author Leslie Scott and marketed by Hasbro. The name comes from the Swahili word "kujenga" which means 'to build or construct'. Players take turns removing one block at a time from a tower constructed of 54 blocks. Each block removed is then placed on top of the tower, creating a progressively more unstable structure. The game ends when the tower falls over.

== History ==
Jenga was created by Leslie Scott, the co-founder of Oxford Games Ltd, based on a game that evolved within her family in the early 1970s using children's wooden building blocks, which the family purchased from a sawmill in Takoradi, Ghana. The name Jenga is derived from kujenga, a Swahili word which means "to build". A British national, Scott was born in Tanganyika, now Tanzania, where she was raised speaking English and Swahili, before moving to live in Ghana, West Africa. Scott launched the game she named and trademarked as "Jenga" at the London Toy Fair in January 1983 and sold it through her own company, Leslie Scott Associates. The blocks of the first sets of Jenga were manufactured for Scott by the Camphill Village Trust in Botton, Yorkshire. The V&A Museum of Childhood has exhibited one of the original sets of Jenga since 1982.

In 1984, Robert Grebler, an entrepreneur from California who was the brother of a close friend of Scott, contacted her and expressed interest in importing and distributing Jenga in Canada. In April 1985, Grebler acquired from Scott the exclusive rights to Jenga for the United States and Canada, and then in October of that year, Scott assigned the worldwide rights in Jenga to Grebler, which he in turn assigned to Pokonobe Associates. Convinced of Jenga's potential, Grebler had invited two cousins to form Pokonobe Associates with him in 1985 to increase distribution of Jenga. Pokonobe then licensed Irwin Toy to sell Jenga in Canada and to be master licensee worldwide. Pokonobe Associates takes 80% of royalties while Scott receives 20% or less, despite Scott having authored and published the game while Grebler effectively acted only as an agent, the reverse of the customary split; Scott says she "came to regret signing away my rights to Jenga on those terms."

Irwin Toy licensed Jenga to Schaper in the United States, and when that company was bought by Hasbro, Jenga was launched under the Milton Bradley banner in 1987. Eventually, Hasbro became licensee in most countries around the world.

By 2019, according to Pokonobe Associates, owners of the Jenga brand, over 80 million Jenga games, equivalent to more than 4.3 billion Jenga blocks, had been sold worldwide. On November 5, 2020, Jenga was inducted into the National Toy Hall of Fame.

== Rules ==
A Jenga tower collapses

Jenga is played with 54 wooden blocks. Each block is three times as long as it is wide, and one fifth as thick as its length – 1.5 cm × 2.5 cm × 7.5 cm (0.59 in × 0.98 in × 2.95 in). Blocks have small, random variations from these dimensions so as to create imperfections in the stacking process and make the game more challenging. To begin the game, the blocks are stacked into a solid rectangular tower of 18 layers, with three blocks per layer. The blocks within each layer are oriented in the same direction, with their long sides touching, and are perpendicular to the ones in the layer immediately below. A plastic tray provided with the game can be used to assist in setup.

Starting with the one who built the tower, players take turns removing one block from any level below the highest completed one and placing it horizontally atop the tower, perpendicular to any blocks on which it is to rest. Each player may use only one hand to touch the tower or move a block at any given time, but may switch hands whenever desired. Once a level contains three blocks, it is complete and may not have any more blocks added to it. A block may be touched or nudged to determine whether it is loose enough to remove without disturbing the rest of the tower, but it must be returned to its original position if the player decides to move a different one. A turn ends when the next player in sequence touches the tower or when 10 seconds have elapsed since the placement of a block, whichever occurs first.

The game ends when any portion of the tower collapses, caused by either the removal of a block or its new placement. The last player to complete a turn before the collapse is the winner.

== Tallest tower ==
The packaging copy of one edition of the Jenga game claims that Robert Grebler may have built the tallest Jenga tower ever at 40 2/3 levels. Grebler built the tower in 1985 while playing with an original Jenga set produced by Leslie Scott in the early 1980s.

== Official variants ==
Jenga Truth or Dare tower

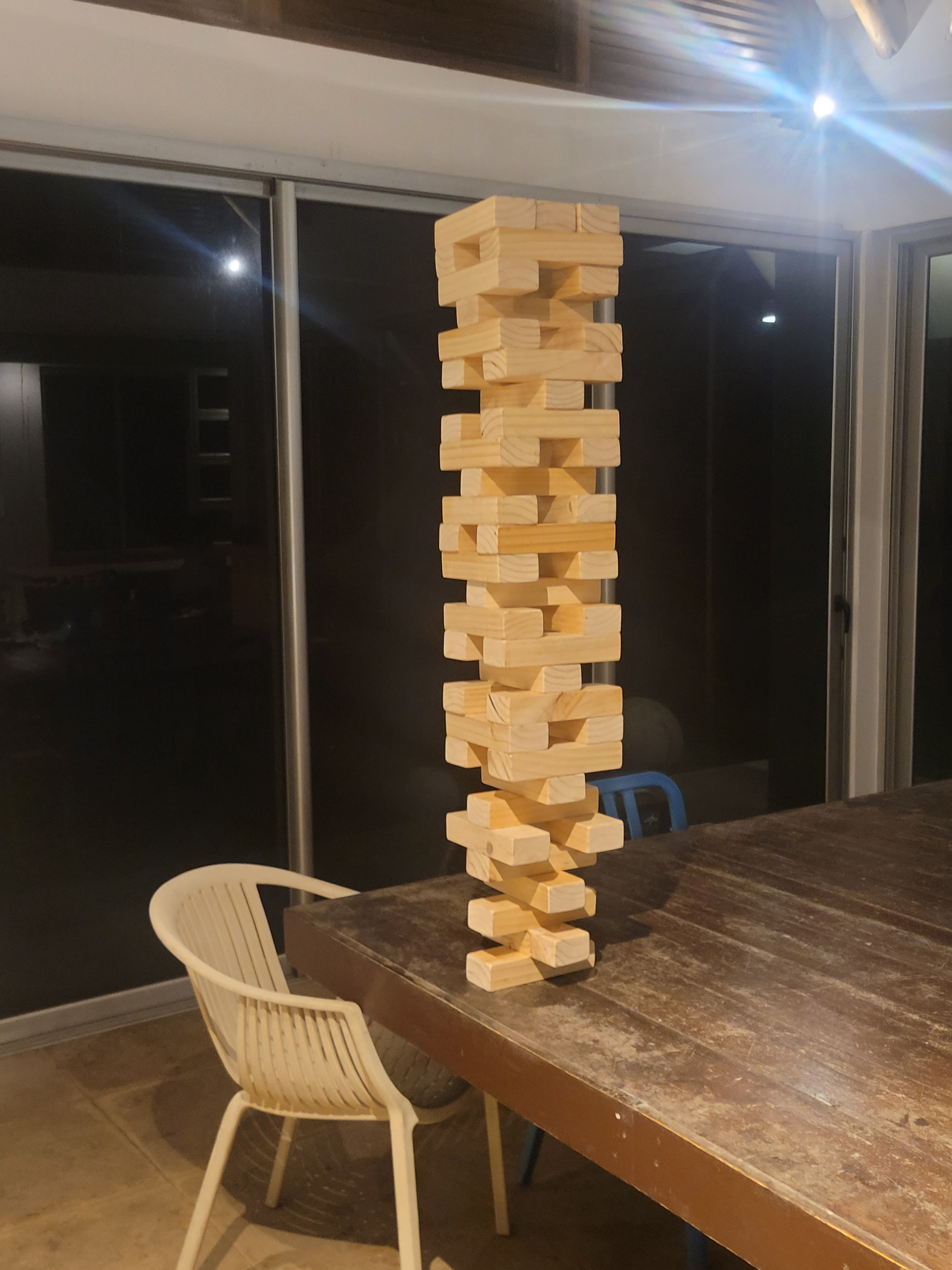
Giant Jenga

- Throw 'n Go Jenga is a variant originally marketed by Hasbro. It consists of blocks that are in various colors plus a six-sided die. It is marketed by Art's Ideas.
- Jenga Truth or Dare was a variation of Jenga also marketed by Hasbro. This version looked like regular Jenga except there were three colors of blocks instead of just the natural color of Jenga.
- Jenga Xtreme used parallelogram-shaped blocks that could create some interesting leaning towers.
- Casino Jenga: Las Vegas Edition employed roulette-style game play, featuring a felt game board, betting chips, and additional rules.

In addition, there have been a number of collector edition Jenga games, featuring the colors and logos of the Boston Red Sox, Las Vegas Raiders, New York Yankees, and John Deere, among others. Hello Kitty Jenga, Transformers Jenga, Tarzan Jenga, Tim Burton's The Nightmare Before Christmas Jenga, Donkey Kong Jenga, Bob's Burgers Jenga, National Parks Jenga, Jenga Ocean, The Walking Dead Jenga, Super Mario Jenga, Fortnite Jenga, Godzilla Jenga, Rick and Morty Jenga, Onyx Jenga, and Harry Potter Jenga are some of the licensed variations of Jenga.

- Jenga XXL and Jenga Giant are licensed giant Jenga games manufactured and distributed by Art's Ideas. There are Jenga Giant variations which can reach 5 feet (150 cm) or higher in play, with very similar rules. Jenga XXL starts at over 4 feet (1.2 m) high and can reach 8 feet (2.4 m) or higher in play. Rules are the same as in classic Jenga, except that players may use two hands to move the eighteen-inch-long blocks.
- Jenga Pass Challenge includes a handheld platform that the game is played on. Players remove a block while holding the platform, then pass the platform to the next player. This variant includes only half the number of blocks (27), which means the tower starts at 9 levels high instead of 18.

== See also ==
- Rock balancing
- 56 Leonard Street, nicknamed "the Jenga Building"
- Pick-up sticks, physical game of removing sticks from a pile
- The Final Straw, a game show with a similar format
- Dread, a role-playing game that uses a Jenga tower

== Sources ==
- Walsh, Tim (2004). The Playmakers: Amazing Origins of Timeless Toys. Keys Publishing. ISBN 9780964697348.
