= List of things named after Nikola Tesla =

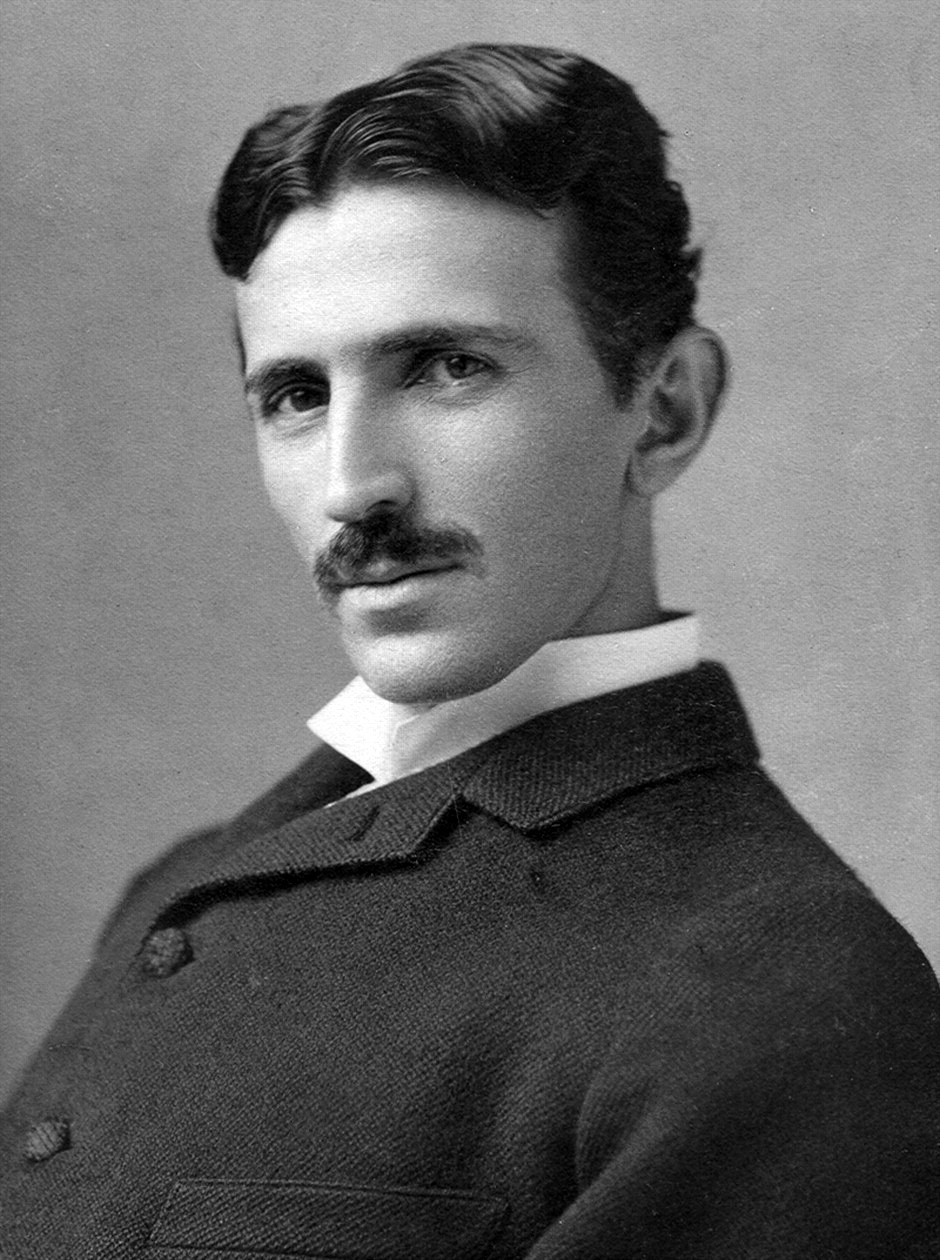
Nikola Tesla (1856–1943)

This article is a list of things named after the Serbian engineer and inventor Nikola Tesla.

== Science and engineering ==
- Tesla Experimental Station
- Tesla tower
- Tesla coil
  - Singing Tesla coil
- Tesla's oscillator
- Tesla turbine
- Tesla valve
- Tesla's Egg of Columbus
- Tesla (unit), an SI-derived unit for magnetic inductivity

=== Astronomical bodies ===
- Tesla, a 26 kilometer-wide crater on the far side of the Moon
- 2244 Tesla, a minor planet

== Other ==
=== Awards ===
- The Nikola Tesla Award
- Nikola Tesla Satellite Award

=== Biographical works ===
- My Inventions: The Autobiography of Nikola Tesla
- Prodigal Genius: The Life of Nikola Tesla
- Tesla - Lightning in His Hand
- The Inventions, Researches, and Writings of Nikola Tesla
- The Secret of Nikola Tesla

=== Museums ===
- Nikola Tesla Museum in Belgrade (since 1952)
- Nikola Tesla Memorial Center in Smiljan (since 1956)
- Tesla Science Center at Wardenclyffe (since 2013)
- Nikola Tesla Technical Museum in Zagreb (since 2015)

=== Enterprises and organizations ===
- 6th Proletarian Division "Nikola Tesla", a Yugoslav Partisan army unit during World War II, in 1944
- Tesla, an electrotechnical conglomerate in former Czechoslovakia, since 1946
- Tesla, Inc, an American electric car manufacturer, since 2003
- Nikola Motor Company, an American hybrid truck design company, in 2014
- Ericsson Nikola Tesla, Croatian affiliate of the Swedish telecommunications equipment manufacturer Ericsson, in 1949
- Tesla Electric Light and Manufacturing, in 1884
- Societies:

- Tesla Memorial Society (founded 1979), originally Lackawanna, New York, currently Ridgewood, Queens, New York
- International Tesla Society (founded 1984), Colorado Springs

=== Holidays and events ===
- Tesla Fest, Novi Sad, Serbia
- National Day of Science in Serbia, July 10
- Nikola Tesla Day in Croatia, 10 July
- Day of Nikola Tesla, Association of Teachers in Vojvodina, 4–10 July.
- Day of Nikola Tesla, Niagara Falls, 10 July.
- Nikola Tesla annual electric vehicle rally in Croatia

=== Music ===
See: Nikola Tesla in popular culture

=== Places ===
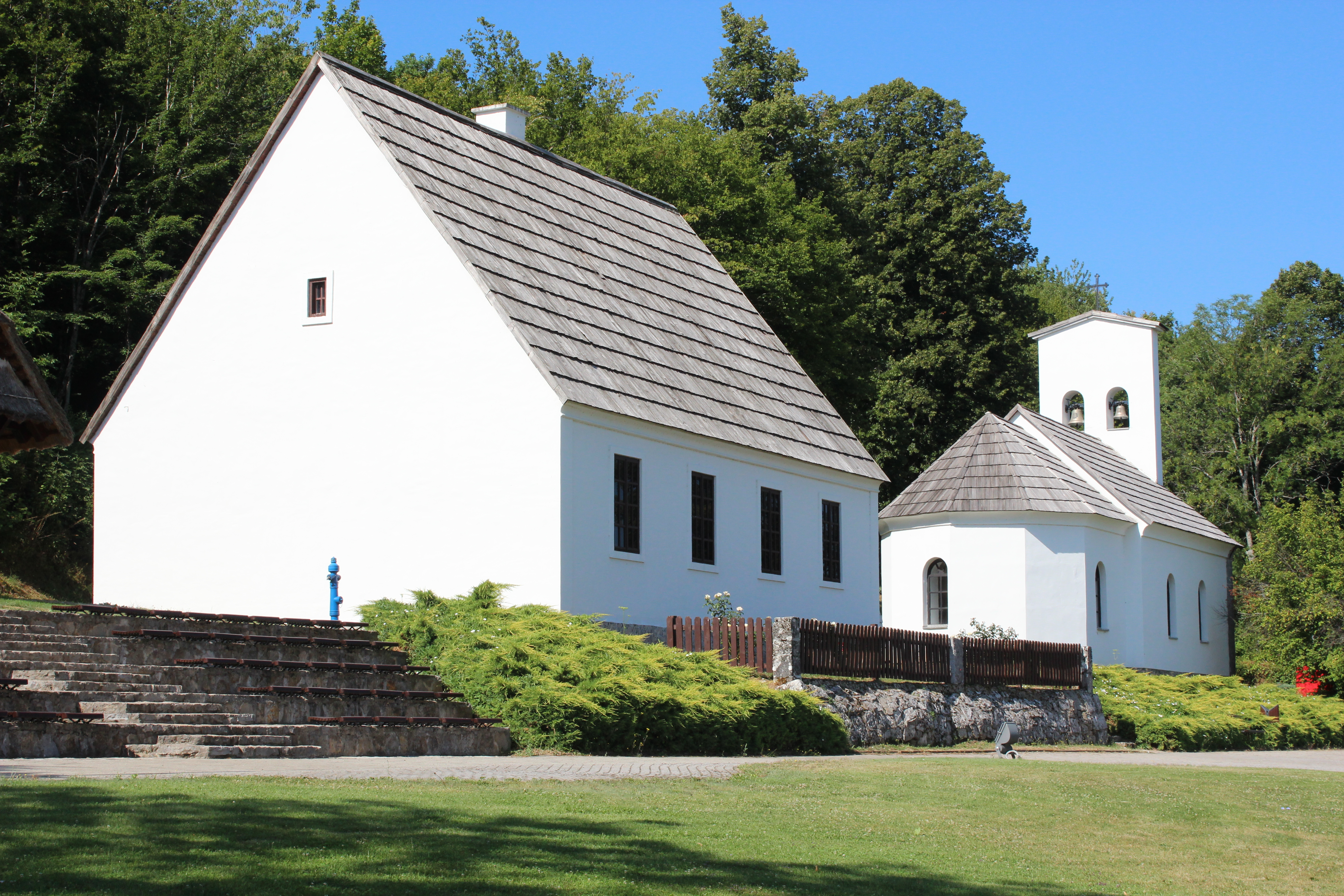
Nikola Tesla Memorial Center in Smiljan, Croatia

- Belgrade Nikola Tesla Airport (BEG)
- TPP Nikola Tesla, the largest power plant in Serbia
- 128 streets in Croatia had been named after Nikola Tesla as of November 2008, making him the eighth most common street name origin in the country.
- Nikola Tesla Boulevard, a portion of Burlington Street in Hamilton, Ontario, Canada
- Tesla Terrace, Madison, Wisconsin USA, the block running from North Rosa Road to North Kenosha Drive on the west side of Madison was long misspelled Telsa Terrace due to a sign-painting error in the 1940s or 1950s. The street's name was corrected to Tesla Terrace in 1987, after a class of Michigan third-graders mounted a letter-writing campaign in support of the change.

=== Schools ===
- Tesla STEM High School created in 2012 in Redmond, Washington as a choice school with a focus on STEM subjects. The name was chosen by a student vote.

== See also ==
- Tesla (microarchitecture)
- Nvidia Tesla
- Nikola Tesla in popular culture
