= Wizard: The Life and Times of Nikola Tesla =

Book by Marc Seifer

Wizard, the Life and Times of Nikola Tesla
- Wizard, the Life and Times of Nikola Tesla
- Author: Marc Seifer
- Language: English
- Publisher: Citadel Press
- Publication date: 1998
- ISBN: 978-1-55972-329-9

The book Wizard, the Life and Times of Nikola Tesla is a biography of Nikola Tesla by Marc J. Seifer published in 1996.

== Contents ==
Seifer follows the life of Nikola Tesla, the Serbian American electrical and mechanical engineer. He covers the high points of Tesla's life through his designs used in the modern alternating current system, experimentation with high frequency current and wireless power transmission, Wireless remote control, X-ray imaging, and Tesla's "death ray". Seifer goes on to cover Tesla's downfall, attributing it to Tesla's megalomaniacal, neurotic, self-destructive tendencies, and Tesla's interactions with financier J. Pierpont Morgan.

Seifer based his book largely on primary sourced documents including Tesla's writings and patents. Also including papers of Tesla's in the Tesla archives in Yugoslavia as well as manuscripts in the United States. Seifer filed Freedom of Information Act requests to get documents from the FBI and other United States government agencies.

== Citations to the work ==
These publications have cited this book.

- Jasmina Vujic, Eng 24 Nikola Tesla: The Genius Who Lit the World
- Fred Nadis, New world orders.
- Katherine Krumme, Mark Twain and Nikola Tesla: Thunder and Lightning
- Fred Nadis (2001). Of Horses, Planks, and Window Sleepers. Journal of Medical Humanities.
- Marc J Seifer, Nikola Tesla and John Jacob Astor

== See also ==
Other works about, or by, Nikola Tesla:

- Tesla: Man Out of Time
- Prodigal Genius
- The Man Who Invented the Twentieth Century
- The Inventions, Researches, and Writings of Nikola Tesla
- Colorado Springs Notes, 1899–1900
- My Inventions: The Autobiography of Nikola Tesla
