= TSLA =

TSLA may refer to:

- Tesla, Inc. (stock ticker symbol: TSLA), including Tesla Motors
- Tennessee State Library and Archives
- Tennessee Scholastic Lacrosse Association
- Torso Limb Suit Assembly, part of a Apollo/Skylab space suit

== See also ==
- Texas State Library and Archives Commission
- Tesla (disambiguation)
