= Wardenclyffe =

Wardenclyffe may refer to:

- Wardenclyffe Tower, a wireless transmission tower designed by Nikola Tesla at Wardenclyffe, Long Island, US
- Tesla Science Center at Wardenclyffe, a nonprofit organization to develop a science and technology center at the site
