= Nikola Tesla (disambiguation) =

Nikola Tesla (1856–1943) was a Serbian-American electrical engineer and inventor.

Nikola Tesla may also refer to:

- Belgrade Nikola Tesla Airport, an airport in Belgrade, Serbia
- Nikola Tesla Museum, a science museum in Belgrade
- Nikola Tesla Technical Museum, a technology museum in Zagreb, Croatia
- Nikola Tesla (Niška Banja), a village in Niška Banja, Serbia
- TPP Nikola Tesla, a power plant in Serbia
- Nikola Tesla Satellite Award, a Satellite Award from the International Press Academy
- Nikola Tesla (Sanctuary), a fictional character in Sanctuary
- The Secret of Nikola Tesla, a biographical film of 1980

== See also ==
- List of things named after Nikola Tesla
- Nikola Tesla in popular culture
- Ericsson Nikola Tesla, a Croatian company
- Tesla (disambiguation)
