= Shoreham, New York =

- Village
- Incorporated Village of Shoreham
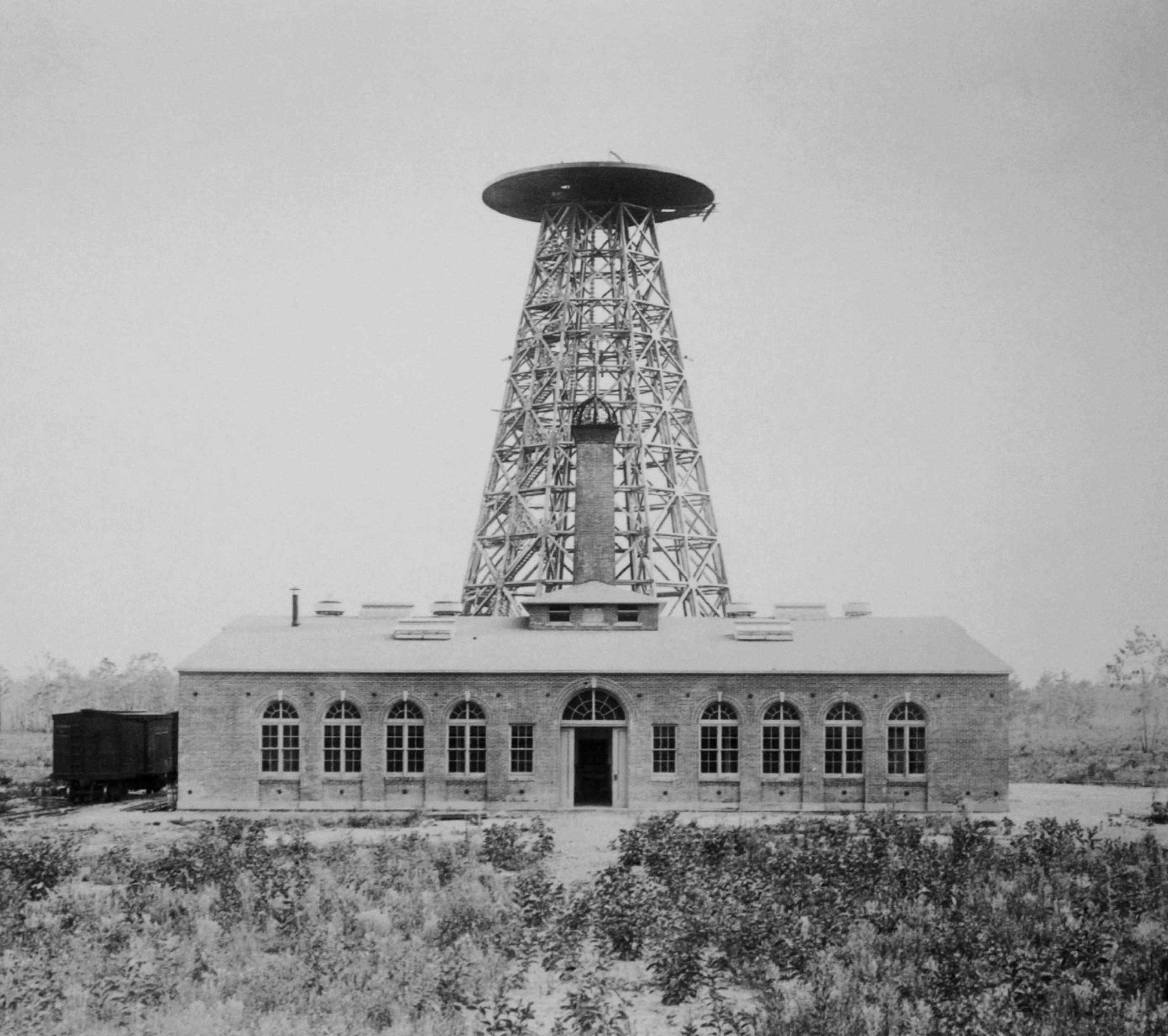
- Nikola Tesla's Wardenclyffe Tower during construction in 1902

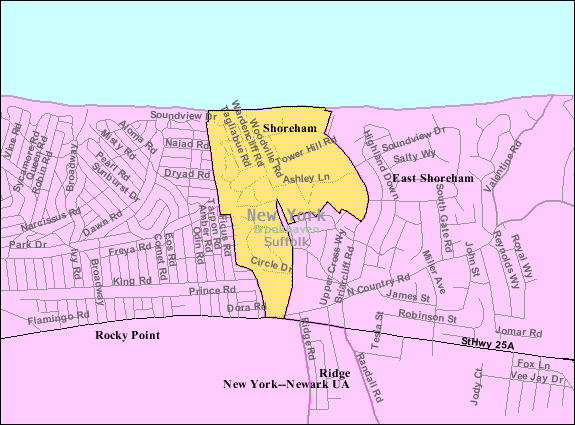
- U.S. Census map

- Location within the state of New York Shoreham, New York (New York)
- Coordinates: 40°57′25″N 72°54′31″W
- Country: United States
- State: New York
- County: Suffolk
- Town: Brookhaven
- Incorporated: 1913

Area
  - Total: 0.46 sq mi (1.18 km^{2})
  - Land: 0.46 sq mi (1.18 km^{2})
  - Water: 0 sq mi (0.00 km^{2})
- Elevation: 66 ft (20 m)

Population (2020)
  - Total: 850
  - Density: 1,235.6/sq mi (477.06/km^{2})
- Time zone: UTC-5:00 (Eastern Time Zone)
  - Summer (DST): UTC-4:00
- ZIP Code: 11786
- Area codes: 631, 934
- FIPS code: 36-67191
- GNIS feature ID: 0965160
- Website: shorehamvillage.org

Shoreham is an incorporated village in the Town of Brookhaven, Suffolk County, New York, United States. The population was 561 at the 2020 census. It is officially known as the Incorporated Village of Shoreham.

== History ==
In 1901, Nikola Tesla built a laboratory and began constructing the Wardenclyffe Tower at Shoreham, with the intent of using it to wirelessly transmit communications and electricity. The tower was dismantled in 1917, and today a nearby static inverter plant receives electricity via the HVDC Cross Sound Cable. The nonprofit Tesla Science Center at Wardenclyffe is in the process of restoring Tesla's last remaining laboratory, building an educational center, and establishing a museum honoring his life and work on the property where the tower was once located.

Shoreham was served by the Shoreham LIRR station from 1900 to 1938. It was located near the intersection of North Country Road and Randall Road.

== Geography ==
Shoreham is located on the North Shore of Long Island, by Long Island Sound. It is approximately 100 km (70 miles) from New York City. According to the United States Census Bureau, the village has a total area of 0.4 square miles (1.0 km^{2}), all land. Shoreham and the adjoining hamlet of East Shoreham share a post office, which has 11786 as the zip code. Despite its official name, Shoreham is invariably referred to by its inhabitants as "Shoreham Village", while East Shoreham is often called "Shoreham".

== Demographics ==
Historical population
Census	Pop.	Note	%±
1920	11		—
1930	135		1,127.3%
1940	25		−81.5%
1950	90		260.0%
1960	164		82.2%
1970	524		219.5%
1980	555		5.9%
1990	540		−2.7%
2000	417		−22.8%
2010	531		27.3%
2020	561		5.6%
U.S. Decennial Census

As of the census of 2000, there were 417 people, 145 households, and 126 families residing in the village. The population density was 938.3 inhabitants per square mile (362.3/km^{2}). There were 163 housing units at an average density of 366.8 per square mile (141.6/km^{2}). In 2010, the racial makeup of the village was 72.4% White, 12.6% Black or African American, 4.8% Asian, 0.9% Native American, and 0.2% Pacific Islander. 6.2% were of some other race, and 2.9% were of two or more races; Hispanics of any race comprised 16.3% of the population.

There were 145 households, out of which 38.6% had children under the age of 18 living with them, 74.5% were married couples living together, 8.3% had a female householder with no husband present, and 13.1% were non-families. 11.0% of all households were made up of individuals, and 6.9% had someone living alone who was 65 years of age or older. The average household size was 2.88 and the average family size was 3.11.

In the village, the population was spread out, with 27.6% under the age of 18, 6.2% from 18 to 24, 17.7% from 25 to 44, 36.0% from 45 to 64, and 12.5% who were 65 years of age or older. The median age was 44 years. For every 100 females, there were 99.5 males. For every 100 females age 18 and over, there were 88.8 males.

The median income for a household in the village was $109,719, and the median income for a family was $116,985. Males had a median income of $81,873 versus $31,250 for females. The per capita income for the village was $37,620. None of the families and 1.4% of the population were living below the poverty threshold, including no under eighteens and none of those over 64.

== Notable people ==
- D. B. Sweeney (born 1961), actor
- Carter Rubin (born 2005), pop singer, winner of season 19 on NBC's The Voice
- Peter Spier (1927–2017), Dutch-American illustrator and writer
- Michael Thoennessen, distinguished physicist
- Richard Benigno, German-American soccer player
- Rob Lieber, Writer, producer and actor
- Keith Osik MLB Player
- Jesse Jantzen NCAA Wrestling Champion
