= Tesla =

Tesla most commonly refers to:

- Nikola Tesla (1856–1943), Serbian-American electrical engineer and inventor
- Tesla, Inc., an American electric vehicle and clean energy company, formerly Tesla Motors, Inc.
- Tesla (unit) (symbol: T), the SI-derived unit of magnetic flux density

Tesla may also refer to:

== Companies ==
- Tesla a.s., a Czech electronics company
- Tesla Electric Light and Manufacturing, a former company in Rahway, New Jersey, US

== Media and entertainment ==
- Tesla (band), an American hard rock band formed in Sacramento, California
- Tesla – Lightning in His Hand, a 2003 opera by Constantine Koukias
- "Tesla", a song by They Might Be Giants on Nanobots, 2013
- "Tesla" (song), by Lil Yachty, 2023
- "Tesla", a song by the Bosnian band Letu štuke, 2008
- Tesla, an album by English musician, Flux Pavilion, 2015
- Tesla, an album by Danish musician, Benjamin Hav, 2021
- Tesla (2016 film), by David Grubin
- Tesla (2020 film), by Michael Almereyda

== Places ==
=== Earth ===
- Tesla, California, a former coal mining town in Corral Hollow, US
- Tesla, West Virginia, US
- Tesla Fault, a geological formation in the Diablo Range, California, US
- Tesla River, Romania

=== Space ===
- 2244 Tesla, an asteroid discovered in 1952
- Tesla (crater), a lunar crater

== Science and technology ==
- Tesla (microarchitecture), developed by Nvidia
  - Nvidia Tesla, a brand of GPU cards with the Tesla microarchitecture
- Teraelectronvolt Energy Superconducting Linear Accelerator, part of the International Linear Collider project
- Timed Efficient Stream Loss-Tolerant Authentication, used in ship automatic identification systems

== See also ==
- List of things named after Nikola Tesla
- List of Nikola Tesla patents
- Nikola Tesla (disambiguation)
- Nikola Tesla in popular culture
- Tesler, a surname
- TSLAQ, a loose collective critical of Tesla, Inc.
