= Telser =

Telser is a surname. Notable people with this surname include:

- Daniel Telser (born 1970), Liechtenstein footballer
- Karin Telser (born 1966), Italian figure skater
- Lester G. Telser (1931–2022), American economist
- Martin Telser (born 1978), Liechtenstein footballer

== See also ==
- Tesler
