= Tesla Truck =

Tesla Truck may refer to:

- Tesla Semi, big rig, class-8 semi-trailer-tractor-unit
- Tesla Cybertruck, pickup truck, light truck grade

== See also ==
- Tesla (disambiguation)
- Battery electric truck
- Electric truck
