= Tesla Experimental Station =

Use of high-voltage, high-frequency electricity in wireless power transmission

Coordinates: 38°50′05″N 104°48′02″W

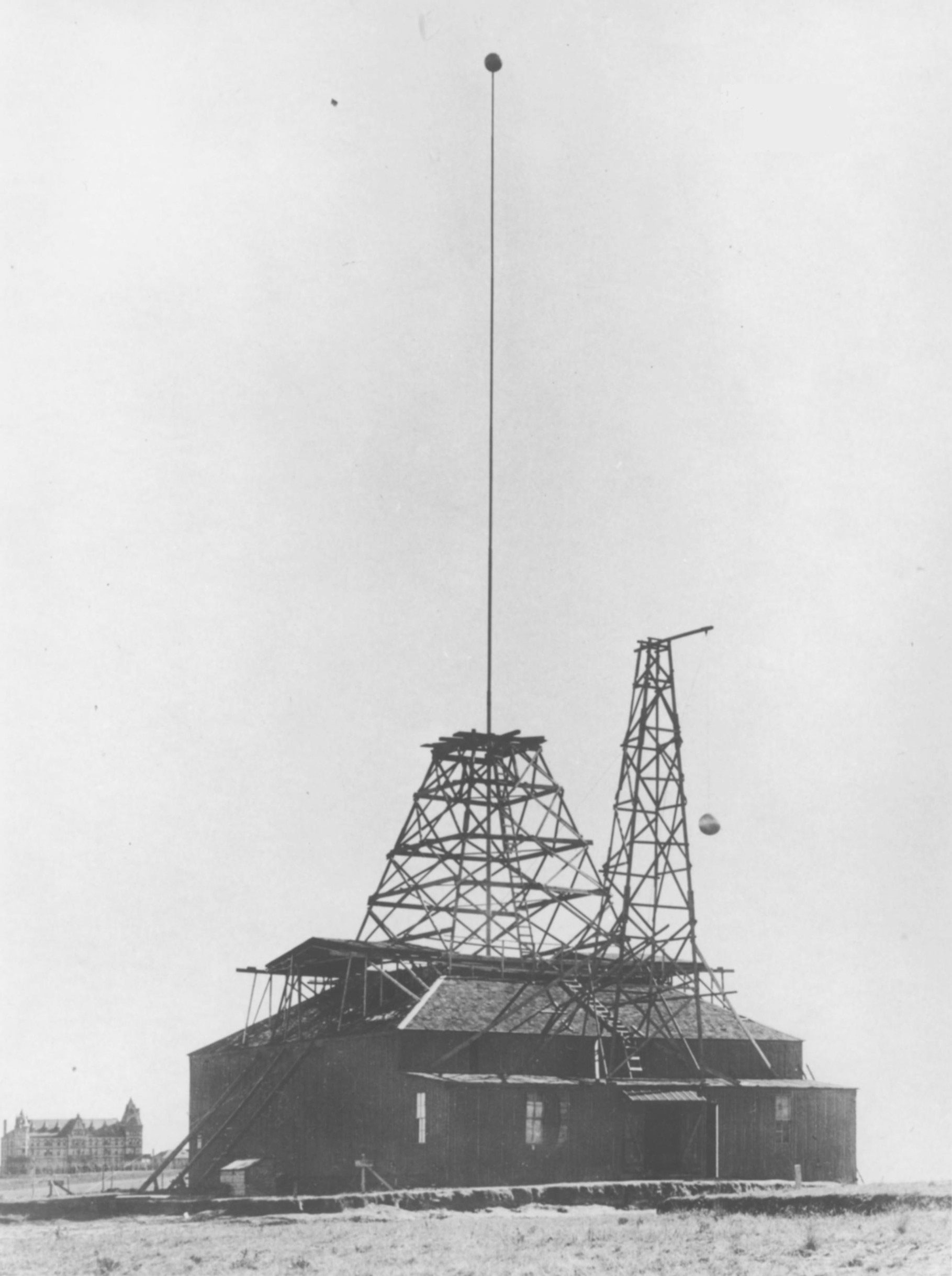
Tesla's experimental station outside of Colorado Springs

The Tesla Experimental Station was a laboratory in Colorado Springs, Colorado, USA built in 1899 by inventor Nikola Tesla for his study of the use of high-voltage, high-frequency electricity in wireless power transmission. Tesla used it for only one year, until 1900, and it was razed in 1904 to pay his outstanding debts.

== History ==
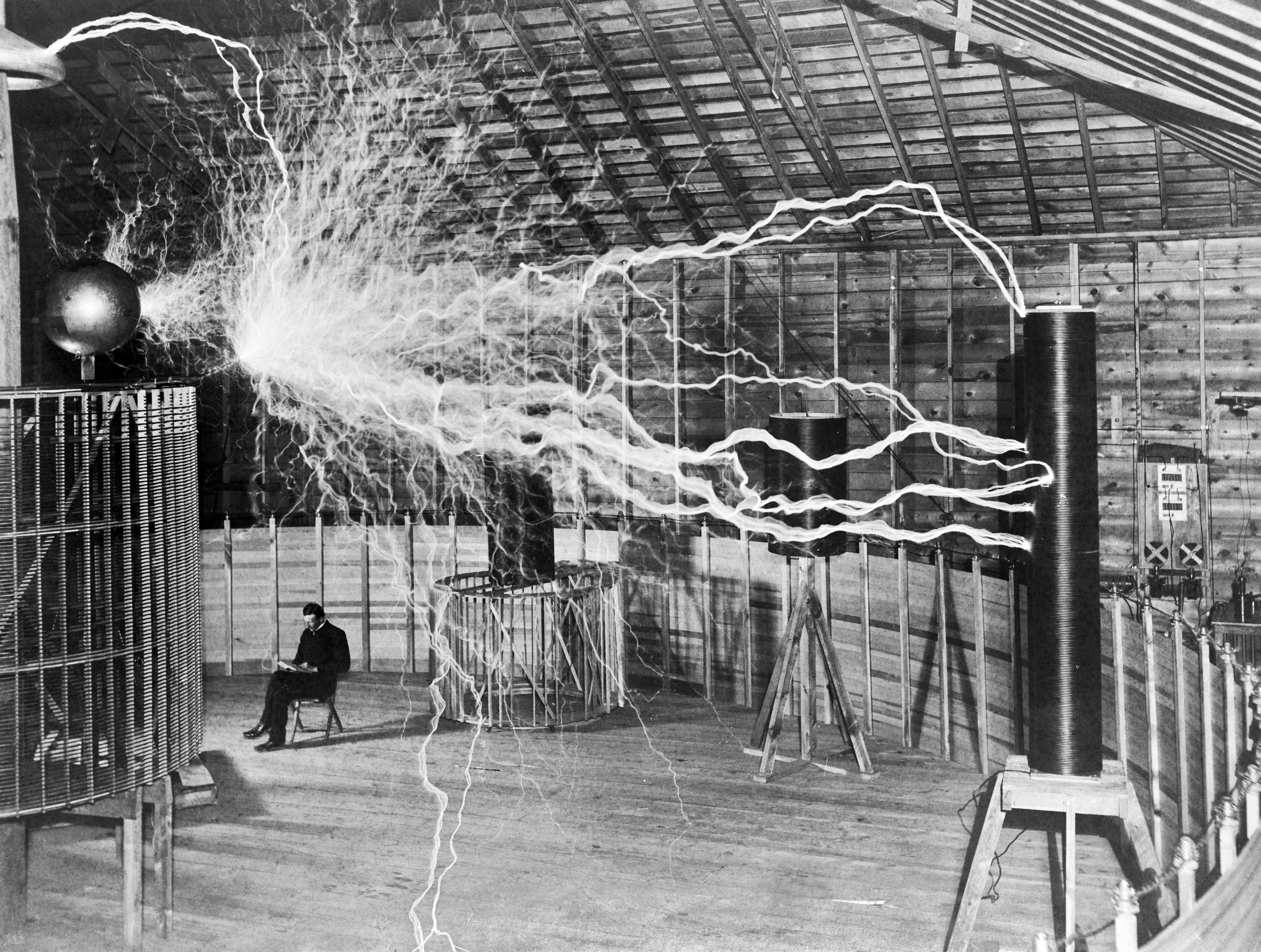
A multiple exposure picture (one of 68 images created by Century Magazine photographer Dickenson Alley) of Tesla sitting in his Colorado Springs laboratory with his "magnifying transmitter" generating millions of volts. The 7-metre (23 ft) long arcs were not part of the normal operation, but only produced for effect by rapidly cycling the power switch.

In May 1899, Tesla, several of his assistants, and a local contractor commenced the construction of Tesla's laboratory shortly after arriving in Colorado Springs, a high-altitude location where he would have more room than in his downtown New York City laboratory for his high-voltage, high-frequency experiments. Tesla moved there to study the conductive nature of low pressure air, part of his research into wireless transmission of electrical power. The lab possessed the largest Tesla coil ever built, 49.25 feet (15.01 m) in diameter, which was a preliminary version of the magnifying transmitter planned for installation in the Wardenclyffe Tower. Upon his arrival, he told reporters that he planned to conduct wireless telegraphy experiments, transmitting signals from Pikes Peak to Paris.

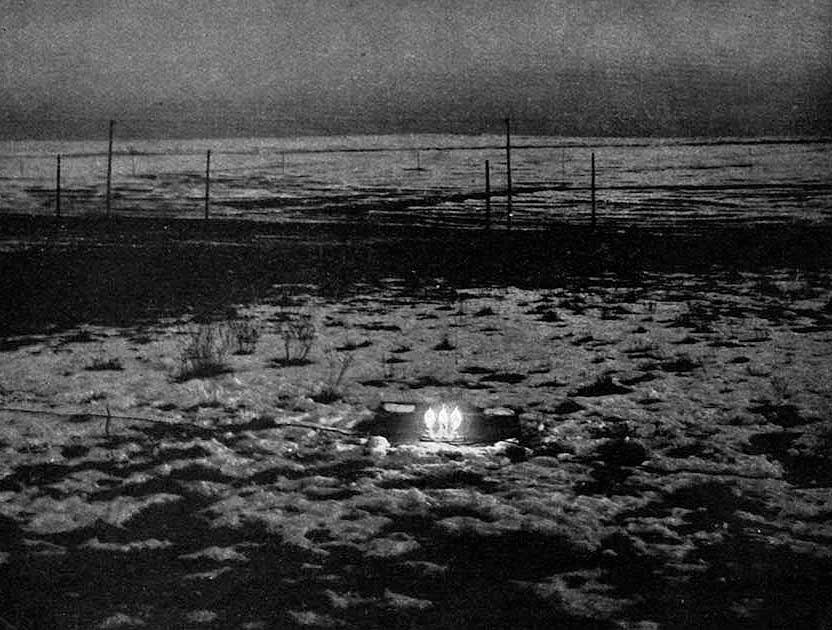
An Alley photograph from Colorado Springs documenting three lights receiving power by means of electrodynamic induction from an oscillator 60 feet (18 m) from the bulbs (placed on the ground outside the building to demonstrate they had no connection to the power source).

He produced artificial lightning, with discharges consisting of millions of volts and up to 135 feet (41 m) long. People walking along the street observed sparks jumping between their feet and the ground. Sparks sprang from water line taps when touched. Light bulbs within 100 feet (30 m) of the lab glowed even when turned off. Horses in a livery stable bolted from their stalls after receiving shocks through their metal shoes. Butterflies were electrified, swirling in circles with blue halos of St. Elmo's fire around their wings.

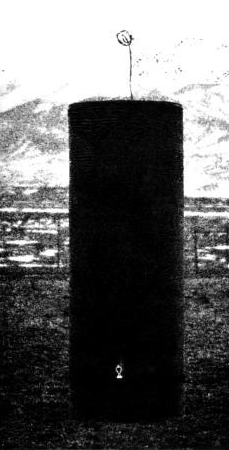
Another Alley photo of a grounded tuned coil in resonance with a transmitter, illuminating a light near the bottom of the picture. Tesla did not disclose how far away the transmitter was.

While experimenting, Tesla inadvertently faulted a power station generator, causing a power outage. In August 1917, Tesla explained what had happened in The Electrical Experimenter: "As an example of what has been done with several hundred kilowatts of high frequency energy liberated, it was found that the dynamos in a power house 6 miles (10 km) away were repeatedly burned out, due to the powerful high frequency currents set up in them, and which caused heavy sparks to jump through the windings and destroy the insulation!"

During his time at his laboratory Tesla observed unusual signals from his receiver which he concluded might be communications from another planet. He mentioned them in a letter to reporter Julian Hawthorne at the Philadelphia North American on 8 December 1899 and in a December 1900 letter about possible discoveries in the new century to the Red Cross Society where he referred to messages "from another world" that read "1 ... 2 ... 3 ...". Reporters treated it as a sensational story and jumped to the conclusion Tesla was hearing signals from Mars. He expanded on the signals he heard in a 9 February 1901 Collier's Weekly article "Talking With Planets" where he said it had not been immediately apparent to him that he was hearing "intelligently controlled signals" and that the signals could come from Mars, Venus, or other planets. It has been hypothesized that he may have intercepted Marconi's European experiments in July 1899—Marconi may have transmitted the letter S (dot/dot/dot) in a naval demonstration, the same three impulses that Tesla hinted at hearing in Colorado—or signals from another experimenter in wireless transmission.

On 7 January 1900, Tesla made his final entry in his journal while in Colorado Springs. In 1904, Tesla was sued for unpaid bills in Colorado Springs, his lab was razed in that year, and its contents were sold two years later in an auction at the court house to satisfy his debts.

== Location ==
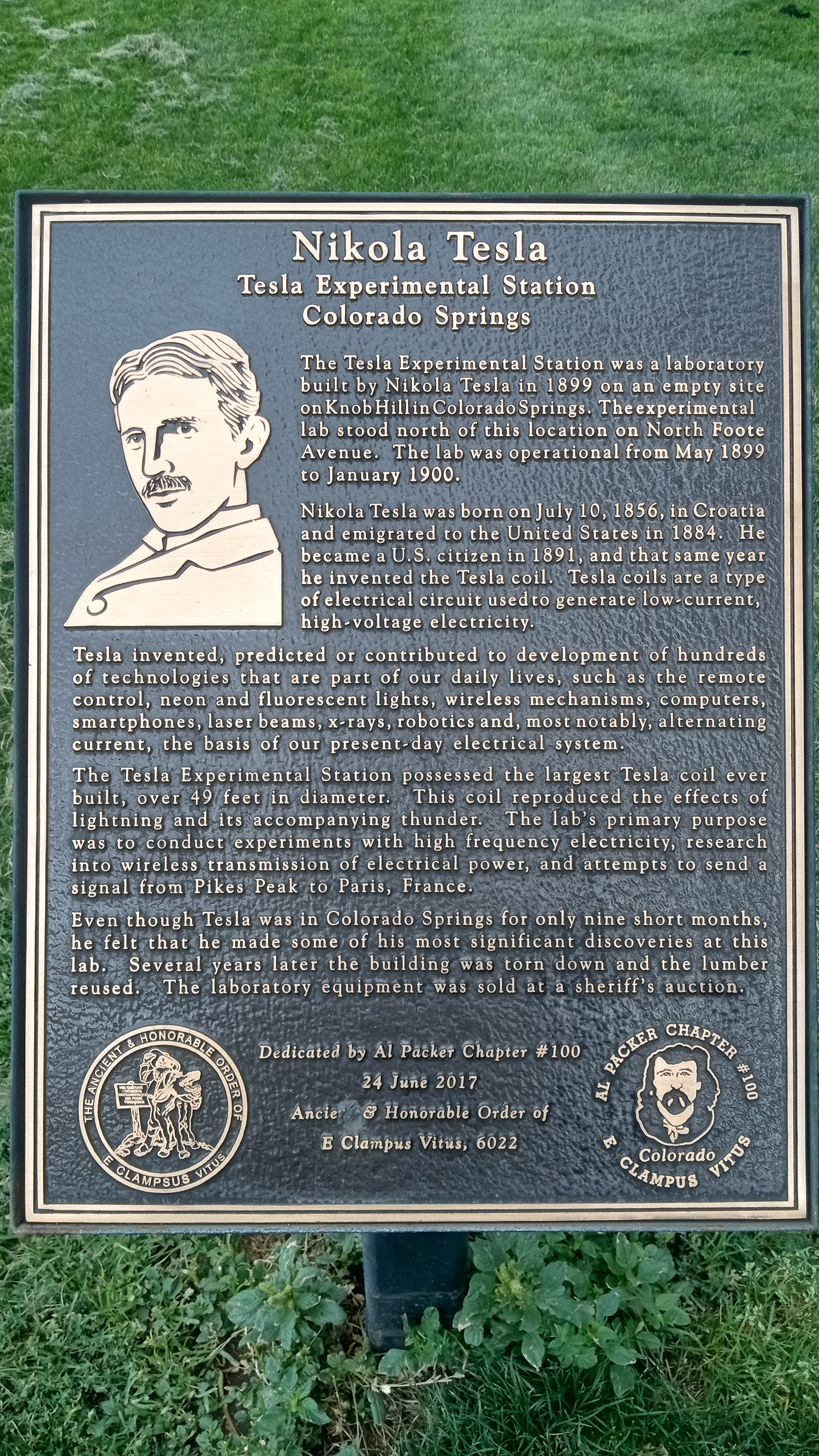
Plaque dedicated to Nikola Tesla in Colorado Springs located in Memorial park near the site of his lab

The Experimental Station was located on empty land on the highest local point (Knob Hill) between the 1876 Colorado School for the Deaf and Blind and the Union Printers Home, where Tesla conducted the research described in the Colorado Springs Notes, 1899–1900. A few papers of the times listed Tesla's lab as about 200 feet east of the Deaf and Blind School and 200 feet north of Pikes Peak Avenue. This put it on top of the hill at E. Kiowa Street and N. Foote Avenue (facing west), as documented by Pikes Peak Library District.

== See also ==
- Wardenclyffe Tower
