= Thomas Commerford Martin =

British-American electrical engineer (1856–1924)

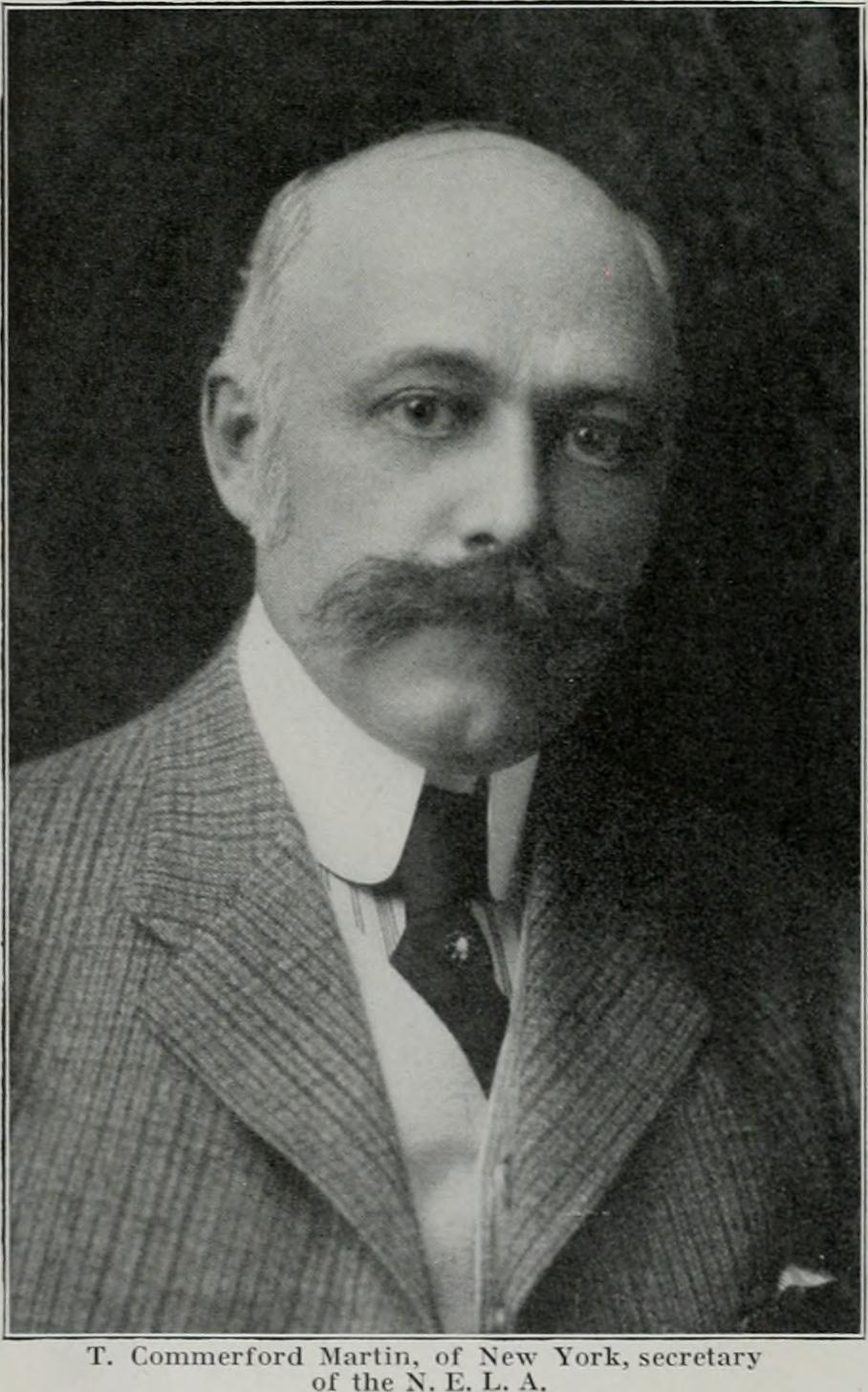
- A photograph of Thomas Commerford Martin published in Pacific Gas and Electric Magazine (1914)
- Born: July 22, 1856; London
- Died: May 17, 1924 (aged 67)
- Engineering career
- Discipline: Electrical engineering
- Institutions: American Institute of Electrical Engineers
- Employer: National Electric Light Association

Thomas Commerford Martin (July 22, 1856 – May 17, 1924) was a British-American electrical engineer and editor.

Martin was born in Limehouse, England. His father worked with Lord Kelvin and other pioneers of submarine telegraph cables, and Martin worked on the cable-laying ship SS Great Eastern.

Educated as a theological student, Martin travelled to the United States in 1877. He was associated with Thomas A. Edison in his work in 1877–1879 and thereafter engaged in editorial work. From 1883 to 1909 he served as editor of the Electrical World, after 1909 was executive secretary of the National Electric Light Association, and in 1900–1911 was a special agent of the United States Census Office.

Martin lectured at the Royal Institution of Engineers, London, the Paris Société Internationale des Electriciens, the University of Nebraska, and Columbia University. He was a founding member of the American Institute of Electrical Engineers, and served as president in 1887–1888.

== Publications ==
- The Electric Motor and Its Applications (1887; third edition, 1888), with Joseph Wetzler
- Edison, His Life and Inventions (1910), with Frank Lewis Dyer
- The Inventions, Researches, and Writings of Nikola Tesla (1893; third edition, 1894)
- The Story of Electricity (1919), editor, with Stephen Leidy Coles

== Sources ==
- T. C. Martin biography retrieved December 1, 2009
