= Colorado Springs Notes, 1899–1900 =

1978 book compiled and edited by Aleksandar Marinčić and Vojin Popović

- Author: Nikola Tesla; Aleksandar Marinčić; Vojin Popović
- Language: English
- Publisher: Zavod za udžbenike i nastavna sredstva
- Publication date: 1999
- Pages: 521 pages

Nikola Tesla's experimental station outside of Colorado Springs

A coil outside laboratory with the lower end connected to the ground and the upper end free. The lamp is lighted by the current induced in the three turns of wire wound around the lower end of the coil.

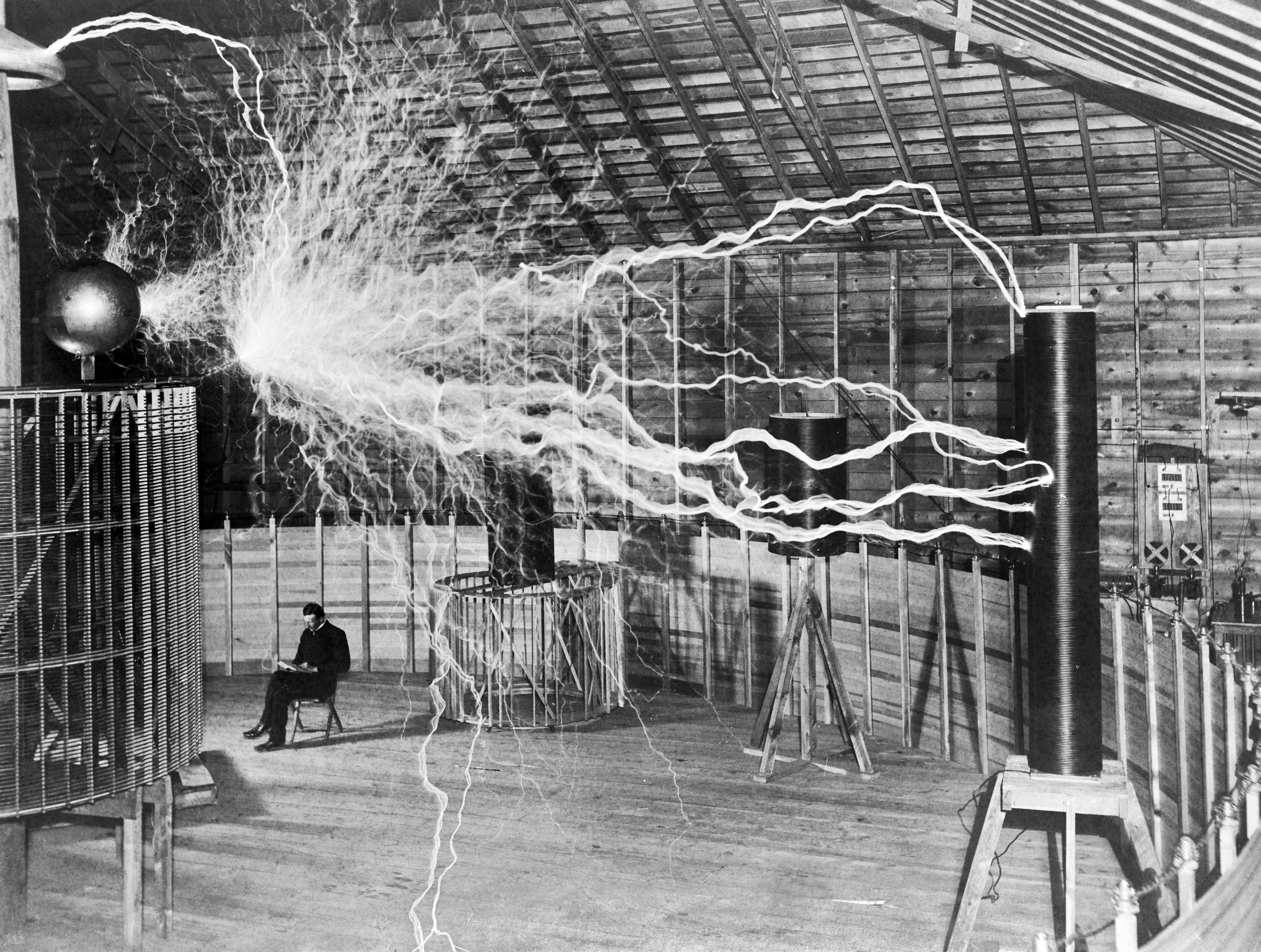
A publicity photo of a participant sitting in the Colorado Springs experimental station with his "Magnifying Transmitter". The arcs are about 22 feet (7 m) long. (Tesla's notes identify this as a double exposure.)

Effect of strong electromagnetic fields: The rough coil is co-ordinated oscillator (50,000 periods) with the basic frequency. The two larger vertical coils on the double and the remaining on multiple basic frequency. A small coil co-ordinated with 26 subject basic frequency likewise strongly one excited.

Colorado Springs Notes, 1899–1900 (ISBN 8617073527; published by Nolit: Beograd, Yugoslavia, 1978) is a book compiled and edited by Aleksandar Marinčić and Vojin Popović detailing the work of Nikola Tesla at his experimental station in Colorado Springs at the turn of the 20th century.

== Preface ==
Tesla's notes at the Colorado Springs experimental station were unpublished until the release of this book. Arrangements through the Nikola Tesla Museum allowed Aleksandar Marinčić to make commentaries on the notes. The Nikola Tesla Museum published the work to mark the 120th anniversary of Tesla's birth.

== Introduction ==
Tesla was focused on his research for the practical development of a system for wireless transmission of power and a utilization system. Tesla said, in "On electricity", Electrical Review (Jan. 27, 1897):

"In fact, progress in this field has given me fresh hope that I shall see the fulfillment of one of my fondest dreams; namely, the transmission of power from station to station without the employment of any connecting wires."

Tesla went to Colorado Springs in mid-May 1899 with the intent to research:

1. Transmitters of great power.
2. Individualization and isolating the energy transmission means.
3. Laws of propagation of currents through the earth and the atmosphere.

Tesla spent more than half his time researching transmitters. Tesla spent less than a quarter of his time researching delicate receivers and about a tenth of his time measuring the capacity of the vertical antenna. Also, Tesla spent a tenth of his time researching miscellaneous subjects.

The authors notes J. R. Wait's comment on Tesla activity,

"From an historical standpoint, it is significant that the genius Nikola Tesla envisaged a world wide communication system using a huge spark gap transmitter located in Colorado Springs in 1899. A few years later he built a large facility in Long Island that he hoped would transmit signals to the Cornish coast of England. In addition, he proposed to use a modified version of the system to distribute power to all points of the globe".

The authors note that no alterations have been made to the original which still contains certain minor errors; calculation errors which influence conclusions are noted. The authors also note the end of the book contains commentaries on the Diary with explanatory notes.

== June 1 to January 7 ==
The main content of the book is composed of notes written by Tesla between June 1, 1899, to January 7, 1900.

== Citations to the work ==
These publications have cited this book.

- VL Bychkov (2002). Polymer-composite ball lightning. Philosophical Transactions of the Royal Society A: Mathematical, Physical and Engineering Sciences
- A Marincic, D Budimir (2001). Tesla's contribution to radiowave propagation. Telecommunications in Modern Satellite, Cable and Broadcasting Service, 2001. TELSIKS 2001. 5th International Conference on
- Zoran Blažević, Dragan Poljak, Mario Cvetković, Simple Transmission Line Representation of Tesla Coil
- Aleksandar Marinčić, Zorica Civrić, Bratislav Milovanović, Nikola Tesla’s Contributions to Radio Developments

== See also ==
- Electrical engineering
- History
- Electronics
- Tesla coil
- Electric current
- Alternating current
- Experiment
- High voltage
