= Tesla Electric Light and Manufacturing =

Company formed by Nikola Tesla in 1884

Tesla Electric Light and Manufacturing Company
- Founded: December 1884; 140 years ago
- Founders: Nikola Tesla; Robert Lane; Benjamin Vail
- Defunct: 1886
- Headquarters: Rahway, New Jersey, United States

Tesla Electric Light and Manufacturing Company was an electric lighting company in Rahway, New Jersey that operated from December 1884 through 1886.

== History ==
Based at the site where 1571-1579 Irving Street now stands, on Irving Street between Coach and Elizabeth, Rahway, New Jersey, Tesla Electric Light and Manufacturing Company was started in December 1884 after the inventor Nikola Tesla left Thomas Edison's employment following a disagreement over payment. The company was formed in a partnership between Tesla, Robert Lane and Benjamin Vail with Tesla given the task of designing an arc lighting system, a fast growing segment of the new electric light industry used mostly for outdoor lighting. Tesla designed an arc lamp with automatic adjustment and a fail-switch as well as improved dynamos. These were the first patents issued to Tesla in the US. By 1886 he had installed a central station based system in Rahway lighting streets as well as a few factory buildings.

The investors showed little interest in Tesla's ideas for new types of motors and electrical transmission equipment and, with the market already heavily controlled by Brush Electric Illuminating Company and the Thomson-Houston Electric Company, they came to the conclusion it was better to develop an electrical utility than invent new systems. By the fall of 1886 they had formed the Union County Electric Light & Manufacturing Company spelling the end for Tesla Electric Light and Manufacturing and leaving Tesla penniless. Tesla even lost control of the patents he had generated since he had assigned them to the company in lieu of stock.

== Patents ==
Tesla had already been issued the following patents:

- U.S. patent 359,748 - Dynamo-Electric Machine - 1886 January 14 -
- U.S. patent 334,823 - Commutator for Dynamo Electric Machines - 1886 January 26 - Elements to prevent sparking on dynamo-electric machines; Drum-style with brushes.
- U.S. patent 335,786 - Electric arc lamp - 1886 February 9 - Arc lamp with carbon electrodes controlled by electromagnets or solenoids and a clutch mechanism; Corrects earlier design flaws common to the industry.
- U.S. patent 335,787 - Electric arc lamp - 1886 February 9 - Arc lamp's automatic fail switch when arc possesses abnormal behavior; Automatic reactivation.
- U.S. patent 336,961 - Regulator for dynamo electric machines - 1886 March 2 - Two main brushes connected to helices coil ends; Intermediate point branch shunt connection for third brush.
- U.S. patent 336,962 - Regulator for Dynamo Electric Machines - 1886 March 2 - Auxiliary brush[es] shunting a portion or whole of the field helices coil; Regulates energy flow; Adjustable level of current.
- U.S. patent 350,954 - Regulator for Dynamo Electric Machines - 1886 October 19 - Automatic regulation of energy levels; Mechanical device to shift brushes.
