= Prodigal Genius =

Book by John Joseph O'Neill

Prodigal Genius: The Life of Nikola Tesla
- First edition
- Author: John Joseph O'Neill
- Language: English
- Genre: non-fiction
- Publisher: Ives Washburn
- Publication date: 1944
- Publication place: U.S.
- English publication date: November, 1944
- Media type: biography
- Pages: 326

Prodigal Genius: The Life of Nikola Tesla (ISBN 0914732331) is a 1944 book by John Joseph O'Neill detailing the life of Nikola Tesla. The book was also released in an Armed Services Edition for American overseas soldiers as book 684. The first printing was November, 1944.

Originally published by Ives Washburn in New York in 1944. It was published in Great Britain by Neville Spearman Ltd. in 1968 in London. It was reprinted in the United States by Angriff Press, Los Angeles, in 1973.

== Overview ==
Written by Pulitzer Prize-winning author John J. O'Neill, who was a personal friend of Tesla, the biography of Nikola Tesla details the life of a pioneer in electrical engineering. O'Neill was a close friend of Tesla, whom he had met as a boy and remained in contact with.

The book covers, among other topics, the story of Tesla's father's inspiration for his career in engineering, shows his theories of electricity that went against the scientific establishment, explores the friendships of Tesla, investigates the story of Tesla's lost Nobel Prize, and explains Tesla's investigations of the paranormal.

It documents Tesla's groundbreaking electrical inventions and discoveries, his eccentric personality, his rivalries with Thomas Edison and Guglielmo Marconi, the War of the Currents and the Radio Wars, harnessing Niagara Falls, the unprecedented success at the Columbian Exposition, the ambitious project to construct the Wardenclyffe Tower, his "superman" mindset or psychology, and his final days in New York City. The book featured detailed technical and personal accounts. O'Neill documents Tesla's major inventions, such as the AC system, wireless technology, and his mental makeup and abilities, which included his ability to visualize inventions in 3D before he began to construct them. He describes Tesla's "Superman" persona. Tesla was a "self-made superman" who lived his life totally and completely for science, sacrificing love and everything else in its pursuit.

It covers Tesla’s life in New York's elite society, his friendship with Mark Twain, his rejection and renouncement of wealth, and his refusal of the Nobel Prize. Being a friend who interviewed Tesla on many occasions, O'Neill offers unique insights into Tesla's personality.

The biography was definitive and well-received. It was printed by the U.S. Government during World War II in an Armed Services Edition and sent to American soldiers during the war. The book remained a much reprinted biography of Nikola Tesla, reprinted in the UK in 1968 and in the U.S. in 1973.
