= Brush Electric Illuminating Company =

Brush Electric Illuminating Company was a business of the late 19th century, based in Manhattan, New York. In April 1881, it made a bid to the New York City gas commissioners to provide lighting to the district encompassing Broadway and Fifth Avenue, from 14th to 34th Streets. It included the cross streets in between as well as Union Square and Madison Square.

The New York City Board of Aldermen granted Brush the lighting contract by voting over the veto of New York City Mayor William Russell Grace. The system of lighting required two electrical circuits. One of the circuits was for lighting the squares with two large lamps. The other was for lamps located at intervals along the streets of the city. Each square was to contain a light elevated 208 feet above the ground. It was to be mounted upon an ornamental pole or moonlight tower.
