= Michael Thoennessen =

United States Academic

Michael Thoennessen is a University Distinguished Professor at the Facility for Rare Isotope Beams of Michigan State University (MSU), an elected Fellow of the American Physical Society (APS), and an elected Fellow of the American Association for the Advancement of Science (AAAS).

== Education and Career ==
Michael Thoennessen received his Ph.D. in experimental nuclear physics from the State University of New York at Stony Brook in 1988. After a postdoctoral fellowship at the Joint Institute for Heavy Ion Research at Oak Ridge National Laboratory and the University of Tennessee he joined the faculty of Michigan State University in the Department of Physics & Astronomy and the National Superconducting Cyclotron Laboratory (NSCL). He served as the Editor-in-Chief of the American Physical Society's Physical Review journals from 2017 until 2022.

== Research ==
For his Ph.D. thesis Michael Thoennessen performed the first measurement of the giant dipole resonance built on highly excited state in heavy fissile nuclides. At MSU he focused on the study of extremely proton- and neutron-rich nuclides. As a founding member of the Modular Neutron Array collaboration his research group measured the properties of nuclides at and beyond the dripline. Especially noteworthy was the discovery of ^{26}O. Overall, Prof. Thoennessen co-authored the discovery of 50 isotopes.

== Honors ==
Thoennessen received the Benjamin J. Dasher Award (1998) and the William Elgin Wickenden Award (1990) of the American Society for Engineering Education. He was elected fellow of the APS in 2005 he also received the University Distinguished Faculty Award at MSU. He won the GENCO (GSI Exotic Nuclei Community) Membership Award in 2005 and the APS Division of Nuclear Physics Mentoring Award in 2009. He was named Physical Review Outstanding Referee in 2013 and appointed University Distinguished Professor in 2013.

== Scientific Publications ==
- Michael Thoennessen publications indexed by Google Scholar
- The Discovery of Isotopes: A Complete Compilation Springer Nature, (2016)
