= The Man Who Invented the Twentieth Century =

Book by Robert Lomas

The Man Who Invented the Twentieth Century: Nikola Tesla, forgotten genius of electricity
- Author: Robert Lomas
- Language: English
- Publisher: Headline
- Publication date: 1999

The Man Who Invented the Twentieth Century: Nikola Tesla, forgotten genius of electricity (ISBN 0-7472-7588-2 : OCLC 40839685) is a 1999 book by Robert Lomas detailing the life of Nikola Tesla. Lomas covers the times of the electric engineer in the United States and the inventors' work.
