= Tennessee Scholastic Lacrosse Association =

The Tennessee Scholastic Lacrosse Association is the athletic association which oversees high school lacrosse in the state of Tennessee, United States. It is the Tennessee chapter of US Lacrosse.

For the 2012 state lacrosse season, the TSLA combined the state's nine Division I teams with 14 Division II teams to form the State Championship Division.

As of August 2016, TSLA was still unsuccessfully lobbying the state to be adopted as part of the state's normal governing body for state athletics, the Tennessee Secondary School Athletic Association.

In 2017, the TSLA decided to split the state into four divisions with four separate state champions beginning in 2018, making it by far the smallest state in the nation with as many state champions.
