= Marc Seifer =

American author (born 1948)

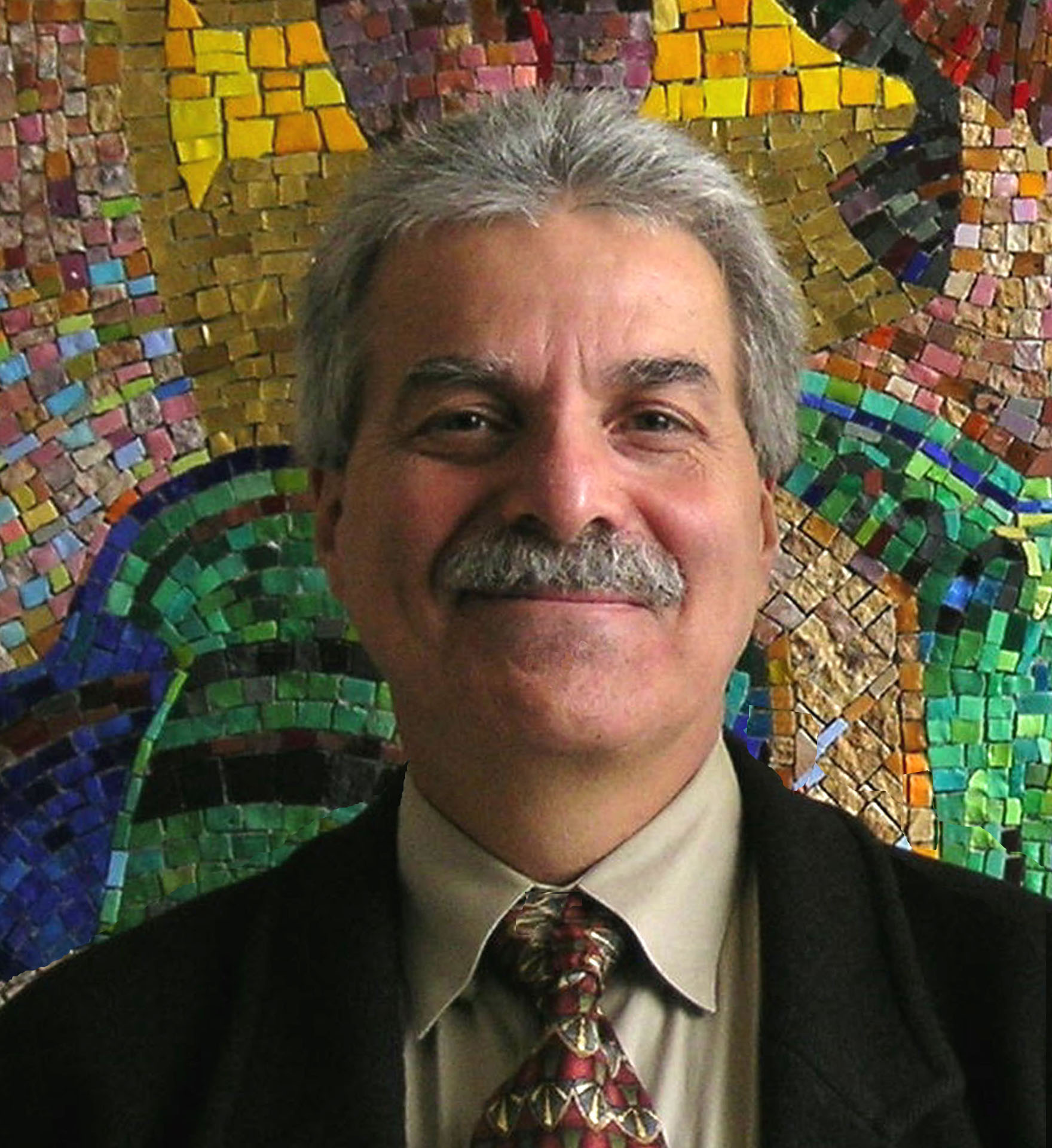
- Seifer in Serbia in 2007
- Born: 17 February 1948 (age 78); New York City, New York
- Occupation: Author

Marc Jeffrey Seifer (born 17 February 1948) is an American author who has published books on handwriting analysis (graphology), human consciousness and the mind, biographies of the inventor Nikola Tesla, and several works of fiction.

Seifer suggests that, "The high-tech conveniences we take for granted -- the cellular phone and television, for example -- would not exist without Tesla."

Starring in the five-part History Channel mini-series The Tesla Files (2018), Seifer has been featured on American Experience and the BBC for his expertise on Nikola Tesla, Associated Press International for his work on the handwriting of bin Laden and as a guest of Coast to Coast AM, hosted by George Noory, a late nite radio show focused on esotericism and the paranormal.

Seifer is a retired adjunct professor at Roger Williams University.

== Publications ==
- Wizard: The Life and Times of Nikola Tesla. New York, NY: Birch Lane Press (hardback), 1996; Citadel Press, Carol Publishing Group/Kensington Books, (softcover) 1997. ISBN 0806519606
- The Man Who Harnessed Niagara Falls. Kingston, RI: MetaScience Publications, 1991. Translated into Polish under the title Forgotten Prince of Energy, (2001) Avanti Publishers, Lomianki, Poland.
- Inward Journey: From Freud to Gurdjieff, Kingston, RI: Doorway Press, 2003.
- Transcending the Speed of Light: Consciousness, Quantum Physics & the Fifth Dimension, Rochester, VT: Inner Traditions, 2008.
- Definitive Book of Handwriting Analysis, Franklin Lakes, NJ: Career Press, 2008.
- Mr. Rhode Island: A Harrowing Courtroom Thriller. White Plains, NY: Polyphase Productions, 2010. (Stephen Rosati, co-author)
- Rasputin’s Nephew: A Psi-Fi Thriller. Part I of the Rudy Styne Quadrilogy, 2011. (Originally released under the title Staretz Encounter.) Bloomingfield, IN: Authorhouse, 2001.
- Doppelganger: A Family Saga, Part II of the Rudy Styne Quadrilogy: The WWI years, 2011.
- Crystal Night: A Family Saga, Part III of the Rudy Styne Quadrilogy, The WWII years, 2011.
- Fate Line: A Graphological Murder Mystery, Part IV of the Rudy Styne Quadrilogy, 2012.
