= The Inventions, Researches, and Writings of Nikola Tesla =

1894 book by Thomas Commerford Martin

The Inventions, Researches and Writings of Nikola Tesla
- 1981 edition (publ. Angriff Press)
- Author: Thomas Commerford Martin
- Language: English
- Subject: Nikola Tesla
- Publication date: 1894
- Pages: 512 pages
- ISBN: 1-56459-711-3
- OCLC: 37556993

The Inventions, Researches and Writings of Nikola Tesla is a book compiled and edited by Thomas Commerford Martin detailing the work of Nikola Tesla through 1893. The book is a comprehensive compilation of Tesla's early work with many illustrations.

== Overview ==
Written in 1893, the book is a record of Tesla's pioneering activities, research, and works. Tesla is recognized as one of the foremost electrical researchers and inventors. At the time of publication, the book was the "bible" of every electrical engineer practicing the profession. The book contains Forty-three chapters, most of them on different areas of Tesla's research and inventions by Tesla. The first chapter is a brief biography while three chapters are transcripts of important lectures and one covers his section of Westinghouse's exhibit at the Chicago World's Fair

Martin stated that, "No attempt whatever has been made here to emphasize the importance of his researches and discoveries". The ideas and inventions are conveyed in their own way, determining by their own place by intrinsic merit. But with the fact that Tesla blazed a path that electrical development would later follow for years to come, the compiler of the book endeavored to bring together all of Tesla's work up to that point in Tesla's life. Aside from indicating the range of his thought and originality of his mind, the book has historical value because it describes the scope of Tesla's early inventions.

== Publication ==
Upon securing the deal to publish the book, Thomas Commerford Martin was praised by his contemporaries as having executed a brilliant stratagem in closing the deal to publish a book which would be a landmark in the electrical sciences. Martin and Tesla both profited from sales of the book, but Tesla insisted that copies had to be given out freely. Tesla was unconcerned with the financial aspect of the book but though in the future it would make a good amount of money.

=== Editions ===
- 1894 The Electrical Engineer (publisher), New York, 2nd edition, copyright expired, scanned copy available online
- 1995 Barnes & Noble 496-page reprint ISBN 0-88029-812-X casebound, ISBN 1-56619-812-7 paperback
- 2014 Barnes & Noble ISBN 978-1-4351-6795-7 leatherbound
- Multiple other versions available

== Analysis ==
Edwin Armstrong, the inventor of FM radio, commented on the importance of the book and stated in the middle of the 20th century:

Who today can read a copy of The Inventions, Researches and Writings of Nikola Tesla, published before the turn-of-the-century, without being fascinated by the beauty of the experiments described and struck with admiration for Tesla's extraordinary insight into the nature of the phenomena with which he was dealing? Who now can realize the difficulties he must have had to overcome in those early days? But one can imagine the inspirational effect of the book forty years ago on a boy about to decide to study the electrical art. Its effect was both profound and decisive.

== Citations ==
Margaret Cheney, in Tesla: Man Out of Time, used the text of the book to call attention to the fact that Tesla indicated that one of the uses of the experimental equipment would be for the professional field of "harmonic and synchronous telegraphy" and that "vast possibilities are again opened up" for the radio arts of the time.

In Nikola Tesla and John Jacob Astor by Marc J. Seifer, Seifer writes of Tesla answering what is the spark of life:

Thus, everything that exists, organic or inorganic, animated or inert, is susceptible to stimulus from the outside. There is no gap between, no break in continuity, no special and distinguishing vital agent. The momentous question of Spencer, What is it that causes inorganic matter to run into organic forms? has been answered. It is the sun's heat and light. Wherever they are there is life.
