= Ericsson Nikola Tesla =

Croatian telecoms manufacturer

Ericsson Nikola Tesla d.d.
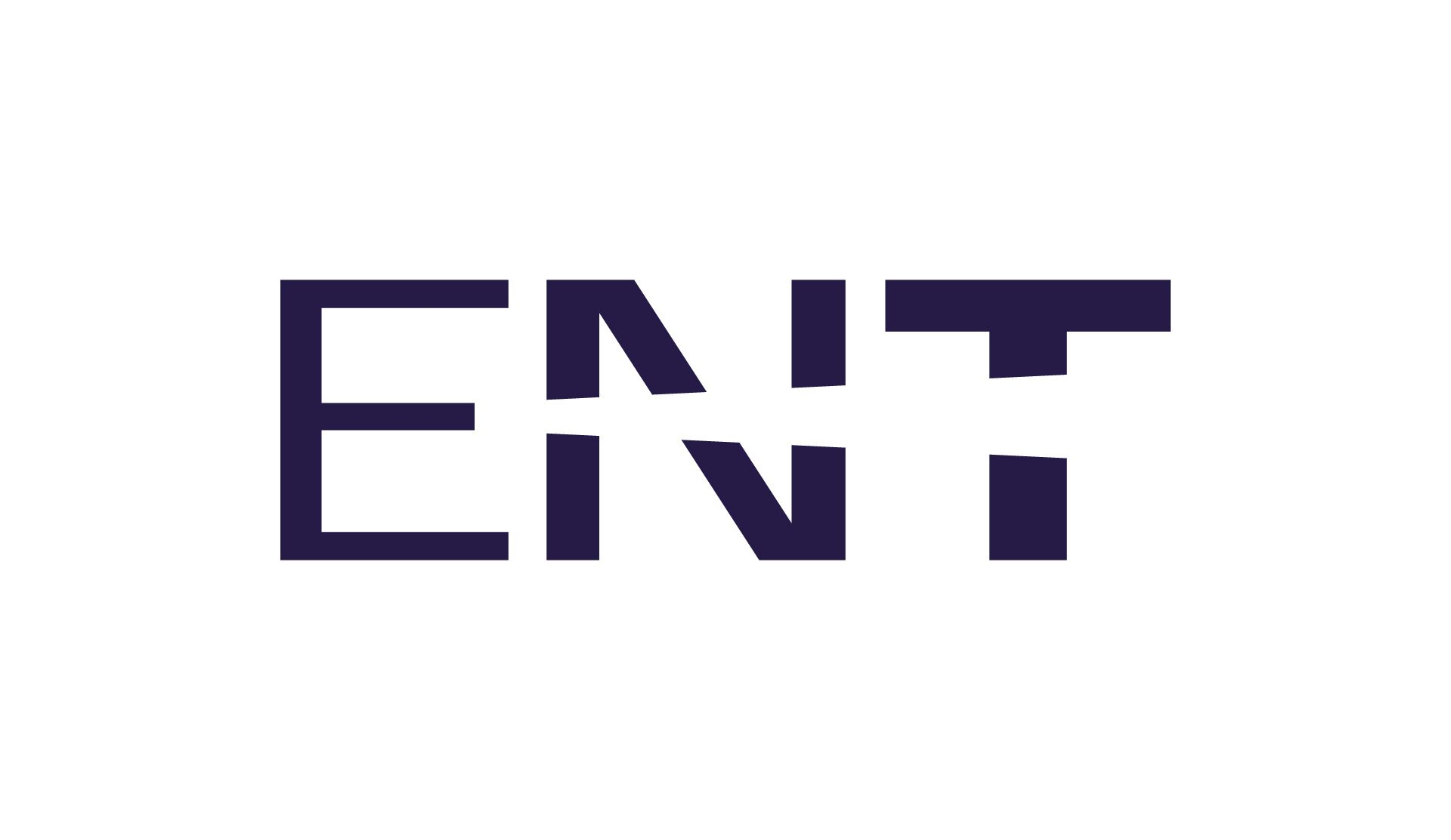
- Type: Public
- Traded as: ZSE: ERNT
- ISIN: HRERNTRA0000
- Industry: Telecommunications
- Founded: Zagreb, PR Croatia, FPR Yugoslavia (1949)
- Headquarters: Zagreb, Croatia
- Area served: Worldwide
- Key people: Siniša Krajnović (President of the Management Board)
- Products: Telecom, ICT Solutions for Digital Society, R&D and Services
- Revenue: € 300 million (2023)
- Number of employees: 2,920 (2023)
- Parent: Ericsson
- Website: ericssonnikolatesla.com

Ericsson Nikola Tesla d.d. is the Croatian subsidiary of the Swedish telecommunications equipment manufacturer Ericsson. The company, named after the inventor Nikola Tesla was founded in 1949 as a state-owned enterprise. In 1953 it became a licensee for Ericsson, manufacturing and selling their phones in the local market and then a subsidiary upon its privatization in 1994. It is the largest provider of telecommunications products, solutions and services in the telecommunications, healthcare, intelligent transportation systems and enterprise fields in central and eastern Europe.

== History ==
Ericsson Nikola Tesla traces its roots back to the state-owned Nikola Tesla Corporation founded in 1949 in Zagreb, FPR Yugoslavia. It was very successful in the local telecommunications market, and the regional markets, especially of Europe, for over forty years. It became a licence partner of Ericsson of Sweden in 1953, selling large volumes of Ericsson systems into the USSR and other markets from 1958.

In 1977, the company began making Ericsson AXE switches under licence.

With the collapse of Yugoslavia and the independence of Croatia, the state began looking to privatize the corporation in the year 1992. By 1994, Ericsson emerged as the highest bidder and purchased a 49 percent share of the corporation —estimated at $40 million, and integrating operations to a significant extent by 1995.

In 2011, the company was Croatia's eighth largest exporter.

== Operations ==
The company is based in Zagreb, with some R&D activities in Split. Staff number in excess of 2900. Siniša Krajnović serves as president of Ericsson Nikola Tesla and head of its Management Board, while its Supervisory Board is normally headed by the head of the Ericsson Market Unit which includes Croatia.

Significant customers exist in Croatia and Bosnia and Herzegovina, as well as other states of the former USSR and SFR Yugoslavia, and parts of Africa and the Middle East, and the company markets to Croatia, foreign markets and the Ericsson Group. Sixty percent of sales are exports.

== Finances ==
In 2025, the Ericsson Nikola Tesla Group reported sales revenue of €238.6 million, down 4.4% from 2024, and a net profit of €17.7 million, up 13.8%. The rise in profit was attributed to a one-off tax expense recognized in 2024. Revenue fell in both the domestic and export markets, mainly because of the timing of network modernization projects in Kosovo.
