= Tesla Science Center at Wardenclyffe =

Proposed science museum in New York

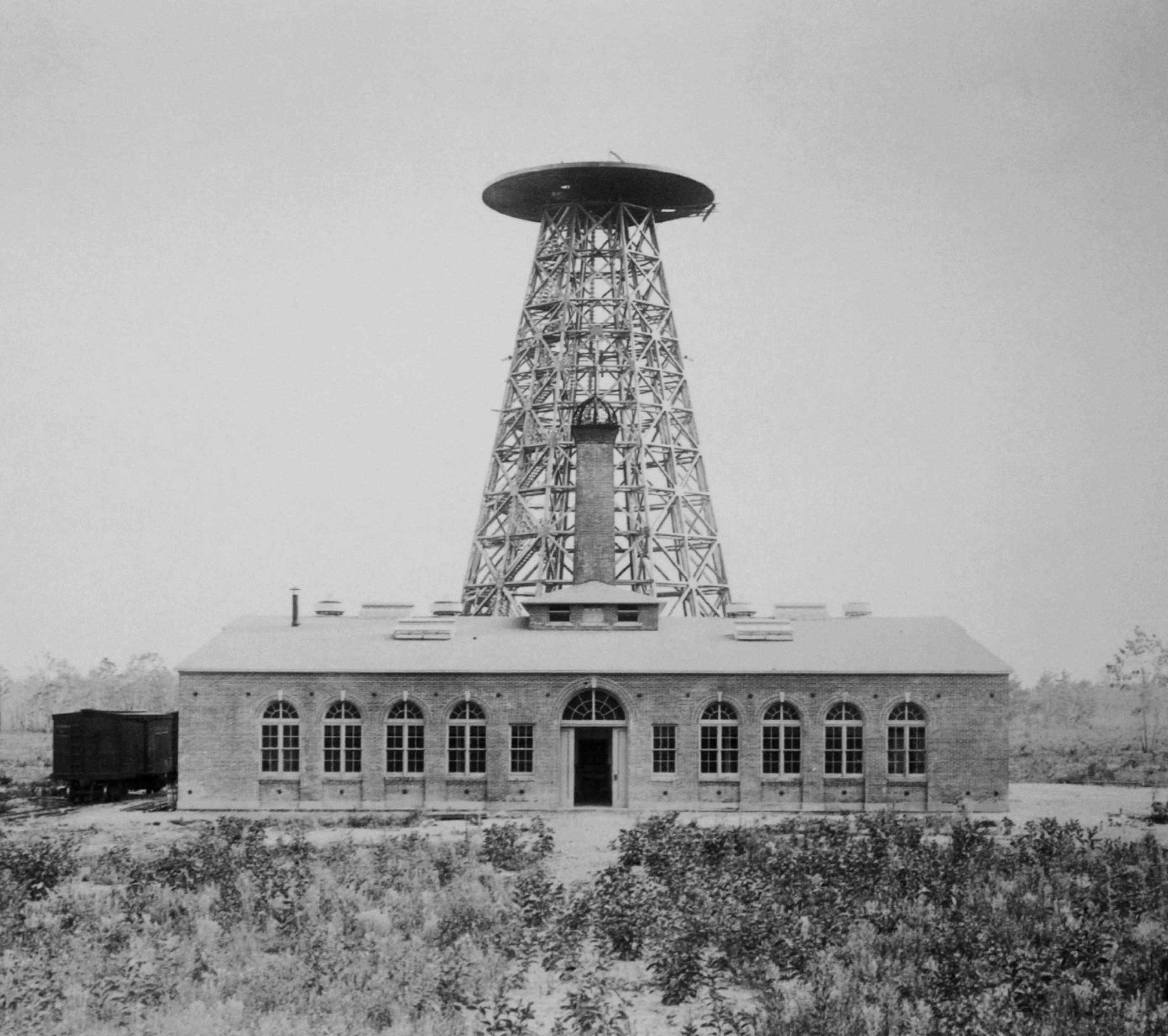
- Wardenclyffe Tower c. 1902
- Location: Randall Road, East Shoreham, New York 11786
- Coordinates: 40.948401°N 72.898248°W
- Director: Jane Alcorn
- Website: teslasciencecenter.org

The Tesla Science Center at Wardenclyffe (also known as TSCW) is a nonprofit organization established to develop a regional science and technology center, museum and makerspace at the site of Nikola Tesla's former Wardenclyffe laboratory on Long Island, New York. The center raised money through crowdfunding to purchase the property. In 2018, the Wardenclyffe site was listed on the National Register of Historic Places.

== History ==
=== Early history of the site (1901–1922) ===
Tesla's design for Wardenclyffe grew out of his experiments begun in the early 1890s up through his large scale experiments at Colorado Springs in 1899. After Tesla returned to New York City from Colorado Springs in 1900 he sought venture capitalists to fund what he thought was revolutionary wireless communication and electric power delivery system using the Earth as the conductor. At the end of 1900 he gained the attention of financier J. P. Morgan who agreed to fund a pilot project based on Tesla's theories capable of transmitting messages, telephony, and even facsimile images across the Atlantic to England and to ships at sea. Morgan was to receive a controlling share in the company as well as half of the patent income. Tesla's decision in July 1901 to scale up the facility and add his ideas of wireless power transmission to better compete with Guglielmo Marconi's new radio based telegraph system was met with Morgan's refusal to fund the changes. Wardenclyffe construction started towards the end of 1901 and continued for the next 3 years.

Tesla built his "wireless plant" on a cleared section of land outside Shoreham on Long Island Sound, part of a 200 acres (81 ha) plot purchased from land developer James S. Warden who was building a resort community known as Wardenclyffe-On-Sound. The plant included a Stanford White designed 94 by 94 ft (29 by 29 m) brick building, a wood-framed tower 186 feet (57 m) tall with a 68 feet (21 m) in diameter "cupola" on top, and a 120 feet (37 m) shaft sunk into the ground with sixteen iron pipes driven "one length after another" 300 feet (94.4 m) below the shaft in order for the machine, in Tesla's words, "to have a grip on the earth so the whole of this globe can quiver."

In June 1902 Tesla started to move his laboratory from Manhattan into a partially completed Wardenclyffe but funding problems continued to plague the project with prospective investors unable or unwilling to invest and a 1903 downturn on Wall Street. In May 1905, Tesla's patents on alternating current motors and other methods of power transmission expired, halting royalty payments and causing a severe reduction in the funds he had to put toward the Wardenclyffe Project. By 1905–1906 most of the site's activity had to be shut down. Attempts to resurrect the project failed and the facility was abandoned, never to become operational. In an attempt to satisfy Tesla's debts, the tower was demolished for scrap in 1917 and the property taken in foreclosure in 1922.

=== Commercial & industrial use (1922–1987) ===
The laboratory building and grounds were used for commercial business until 1987, when the last company ceased business operations there. For 50 years, Wardenclyffe was a processing facility producing photography supplies. Many buildings were added to the site and the land it occupies has been trimmed down to 16 acres (6.5 ha), but the Stanford White-designed 94 by 94 ft (29 by 29 m) brick building remains standing to this day. Eventually the site was turned into a Superfund hazardous waste site, taking years to clean up.

=== Preservation initiative (1994–2012) ===
In 1994, acting on the advice of the President's Advisory Council on Historic Preservation, a formal nomination process was initiated by the Tesla Wardenclyffe Project seeking placement of the Wardenclyffe laboratory-office building and the Tesla Tower Foundation on both the New York State and National Registers of Historic Places. This would result in the creation of a monument to Tesla at the Wardenclyffe site itself.

As of August 2012, the site was owned by Agfa.

=== Fundraising effort (2012–present) ===
Jane Alcorn, president of the nonprofit group The Tesla Science Center at Wardenclyffe, and Matthew Inman, creator of web cartoon The Oatmeal, joined forces in 2012 to honor "the Father of the Electric Age", by preserving the Wardenclyffe facility as a science center and museum. They initiated the Let's Build a Goddamn Tesla Museum fund-raising campaign on the Indiegogo crowdfunding site, to raise funding to buy the Wardenclyffe property and restore the facility. The project reached its goal of raising $850,000 within a week, after a $33,333 donation from the producers of the Tesla film "Fragments from Olympus: The Vision of Nikola Tesla" put them over the top. The campaign also attracted donations from benefactors such as Elon Musk.

The money raised within one week was enough to get a matching grant from the state of New York, allowing the project to be able to meet the seller's asking price of $1.6 million. Including the grant, the crowdfunding campaign raised approximately $1,700,000 in six days, with the campaign originally slated to run 45 days.

On May 2, 2013, The Tesla Science Center at Wardenclyffe announced that they had purchased the 15.69 acre laboratory site from Agfa Corporation and will begin to raise "about $10 million to create a science learning center and museum worthy of Tesla and his legacy." On September 23, 2013, the president of Serbia, Tomislav Nikolić, unveiled a monument to Tesla at the Wardenclyffe site. Nikolić said that he had planned to push for the monument to be displayed at the United Nations, but chose Wardenclyffe once he learned it had been purchased for the center.

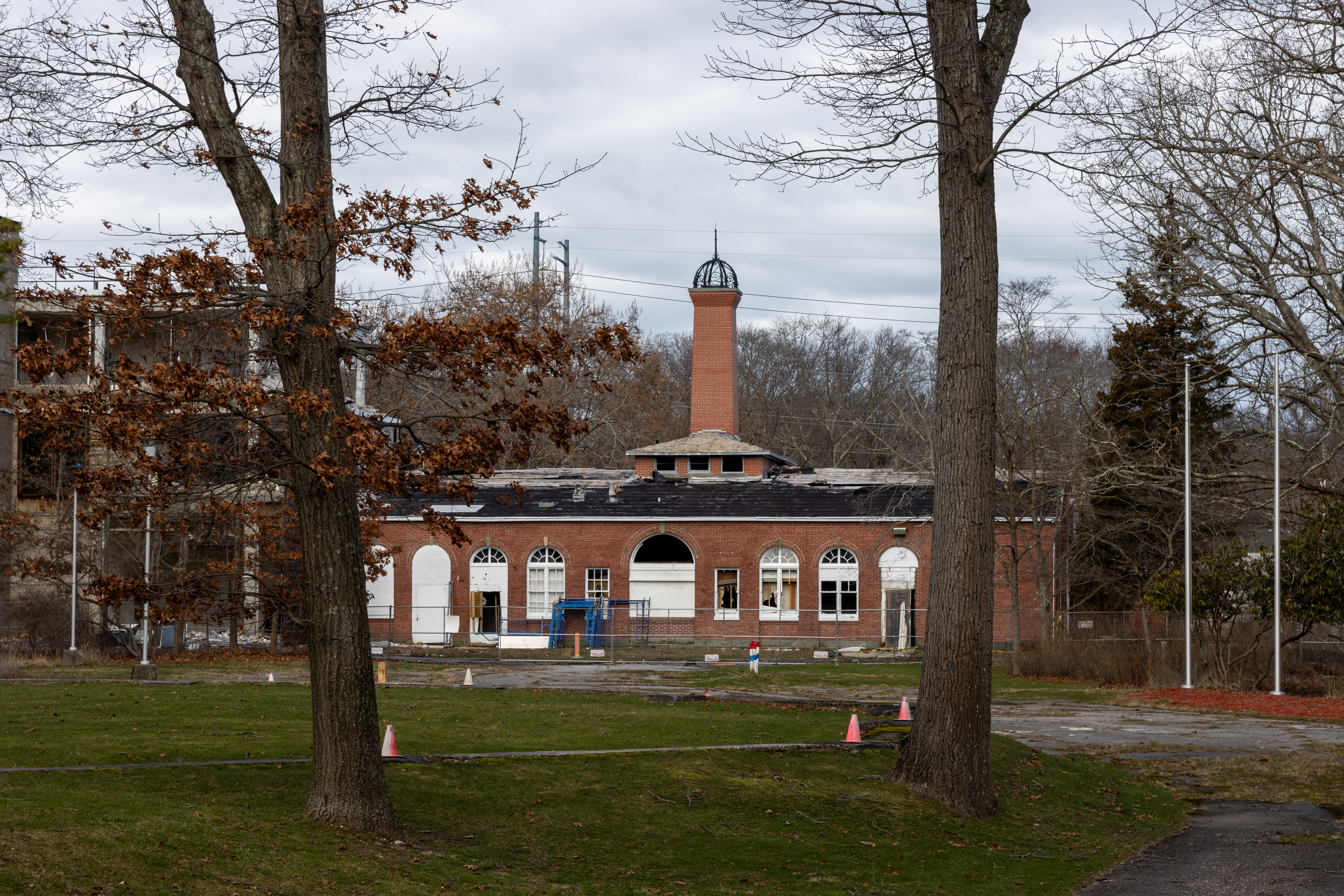
The site in 2024, after the fire. The location of the Tower can be seen by the cones in the foreground.

On May 13, 2014, The Oatmeal published a comic called "What It's Like to Own a Model S, Part 2," in which he requested a further donation of $8 million from Tesla Motors founder Elon Musk in order to propel the museum toward completion. The next day, Musk stated on Twitter that he "would be happy to help." On July 10, 2014, during a 158th birthday celebration for Tesla at the Wardenclyffe site, it was announced that Musk would donate $1 million toward funding the museum, as well as having a Tesla Motors supercharging station installed onsite.

In July 2018, the Wardenclyffe site was listed on the National Register of Historic Places.

On December 19, 2019, the Tesla Science Center at Wardenclyffe was awarded a $750,000 Regional Economic Development Council grant from New York State to transform the only existing laboratory of inventor Nikola Tesla into three unique attractions: a museum honoring Tesla and his legacy; a center for education and research; and an entrepreneur and technologist innovation program.

On November 21, 2023, around 5:00 PM, a major fire swept through the Tesla Science Center, leaving parts "in ruins." It had been due to open to the public soon, but repairs were estimated to cost $3 million to fix the damage.

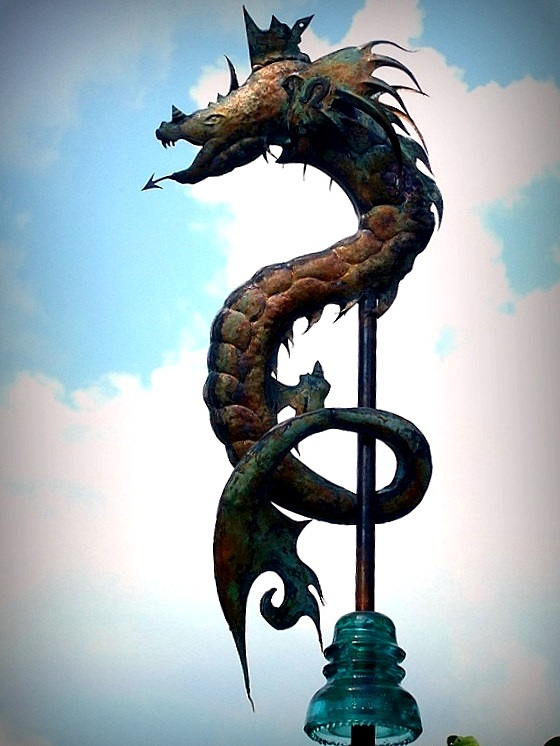
"Tesla's Dragon." Copper lightning rod at the Tesla Science Center, based on a Hemingray insulator

== Programs and exhibits ==
Wardenclyffe is not open to the public year-round, but the center offers seasonal events on the grounds as well as traveling educational programs, film screenings and exhibits throughout the year including an annual Nikola Tesla Expo held around the date of Nikola Tesla's birth on July 10th, celebrated as Nikola Tesla Day.

Future expansion of the educational programs is intended to include science-teacher associations, conferences, symposia, field trips, associations with science competitions, and other science programs. Planned permanent exhibits include a Tesla exhibit, exploratorium-type exhibits, and a living museum.

== See also ==
- Nikola Tesla Memorial Center in Smiljan, Croatia
- Nikola Tesla Museum in Belgrade, Serbia
- List of science museums
