= Tesler =

Tesler is a surname. Notable people with the surname include:

- Ayla Tesler-Mabe, Canadian musician
- Brian Tesler (1929–2024), British television producer and executive
- Ioan Tesler (1903–1942), Romanian footballer
- Larry Tesler (1945–2020), American computer scientist

== Fictional characters ==
- List of Tron (franchise) characters#Tesler
