= Wardenclyffe Tower =

Experimental wireless transmission station (1901–1917)

- Wardenclyffe Towers
- U.S. National Register of Historic Places
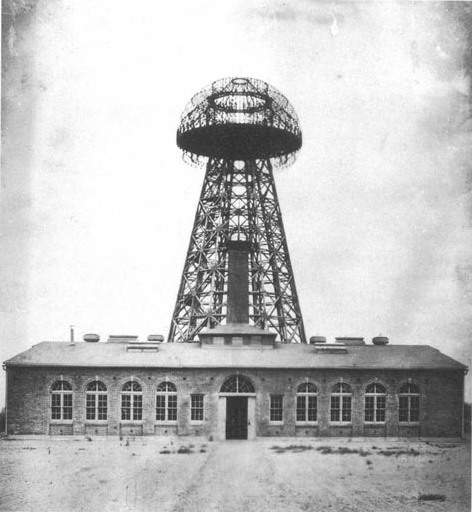
- 1904 image of Wardenclyffe Tower

- Location within New York Location within the United States
- Location: Shoreham, Long Island, New York
- Coordinates: 40°56′51.3″N 72°53′53.5″W
- Built: 1901
- Architects: Stanford White, Nikola Tesla
- NRHP reference No.: 100002744
- Added to NRHP: July 27, 2018

Wardenclyffe Tower (1901–1917), also known as the Tesla Tower, was an early experimental Wireless transmission station designed and built by scientist Nikola Tesla on Long Island in 1901–1902, located in the village of Shoreham, New York. Tesla intended to transmit messages, telephony, and even facsimile images across the Atlantic Ocean to England and to ships at sea based on his theories of using the Earth to conduct the signals. His decision to increase the scale of the facility and implement his ideas of wireless power transfer to better compete with Guglielmo Marconi's radio-based telegraph system was met with refusal to fund the changes by the project's primary backer, financier J. P. Morgan. Additional investment could not be found, and the project was abandoned in 1906, never to become operational.

In an attempt to satisfy Tesla's debts, the tower was demolished for scrap in 1917 and the property taken in foreclosure in 1922. For 50 years, Wardenclyffe was a processing facility producing photography supplies. Many buildings were added to the site and the land it occupies has been trimmed down from 200 acres (81 ha) to 16 acres (6.5 ha) but the original, 94 by 94 ft (29 by 29 m), brick building designed by Stanford White remains standing.

In the 1980s and 2000s, hazardous waste from the photographic era was cleaned up, and the site was sold and cleared for new development. A grassroots campaign to save the site succeeded in purchasing the property in 2013, with plans to build a future museum dedicated to Nikola Tesla. In 2018, the property was listed on the National Register of Historic Places.

== Design and operational principles ==
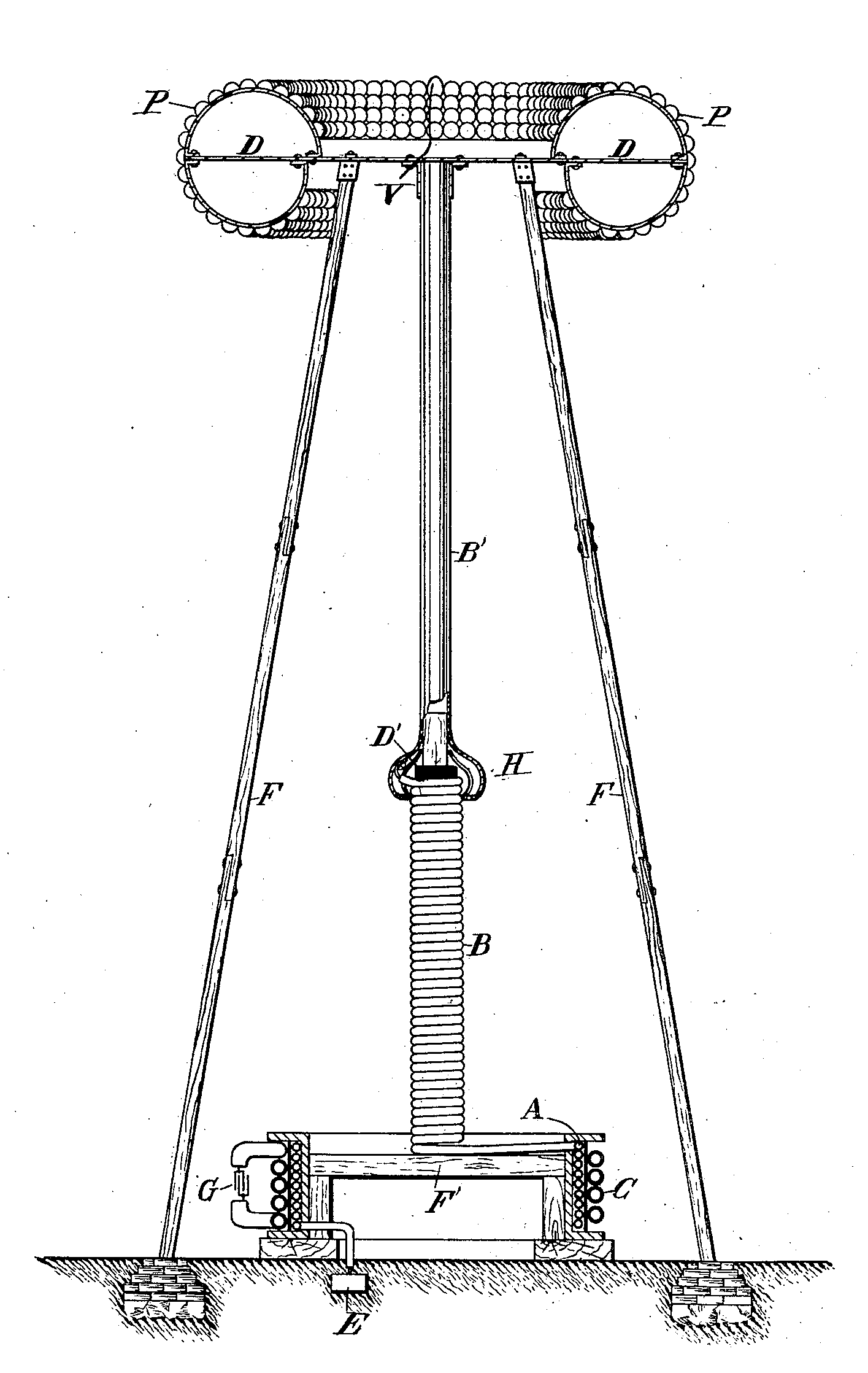
Tesla's Magnifying "Apparatus for transmitting electrical energy" United States patent 1119732 covers the basic function of the device used at Wardenclyffe.

=== Origin ===
Tesla's design for Wardenclyffe grew out of his experiments beginning in the early 1890s. His primary goal in these experiments was to develop a new wireless power transmission system.

Tesla discarded the idea of using the newly discovered Hertzian waves (radio waves), detected in 1888 by German physicist Heinrich Rudolf Hertz. Tesla doubted they existed and he followed scientific thought of the period that, if they did exist, this was just a type of invisible light which would travel in straight lines the way visible light did, meaning they would travel straight out into space and be "hopelessly lost".

In laboratory work and later large-scale experiments at Colorado Springs, Colorado, in 1899, Tesla developed his own ideas on how a worldwide wireless system would work. He theorized from these experiments that if he injected electric current into the Earth at just the right frequency he could harness what he believed was the planet's own electrical charge and cause it to resonate at a frequency that would be amplified in "standing waves" that could be tapped anywhere on the planet to run devices or, through modulation, carry a signal. His system was based more on 19th-century ideas of electrical conduction and telegraphy instead of the newer theories of electromagnetic waves, with an electrical charge being conducted through the ground and being returned through the air.

Tesla's design used a concept of a charged conductive upper layer in the atmosphere, a theory dating back to an 1872 idea for a proposed wireless power system by Mahlon Loomis. Tesla not only believed that he could use this layer as the return path in his electrical conduction system, but that the power flowing through it would make it glow, providing night time lighting for cities and shipping lanes.

In February 1901, in a Collier's Weekly article titled "Talking With Planets", Tesla described his "system of energy transmission and of telegraphy without the use of wires" as:

(using) the Earth itself as the medium for conducting the currents, thus dispensing with wires and all other artificial conductors ... a machine which, to explain its operation in plain language, resembled a pump in its action, drawing electricity from the Earth and driving it back into the same at an enormous rate, thus creating ripples or disturbances which, spreading through the Earth as through a wire, could be detected at great distances by carefully attuned receiving circuits. In this manner I was able to transmit to a distance, not only feeble effects for the purposes of signaling, but considerable amounts of energy, and later discoveries I made convinced me that I shall ultimately succeed in conveying power without wires, for industrial purposes, with high economy, and to any distance, however great.

Although Tesla demonstrated wireless power transmission at Colorado Springs, lighting electric lights mounted outside the building where he had his large experimental coil, he did not scientifically test his theories. He believed he had achieved Earth resonance which, according to his theory, would work at any distance.

=== Financing ===
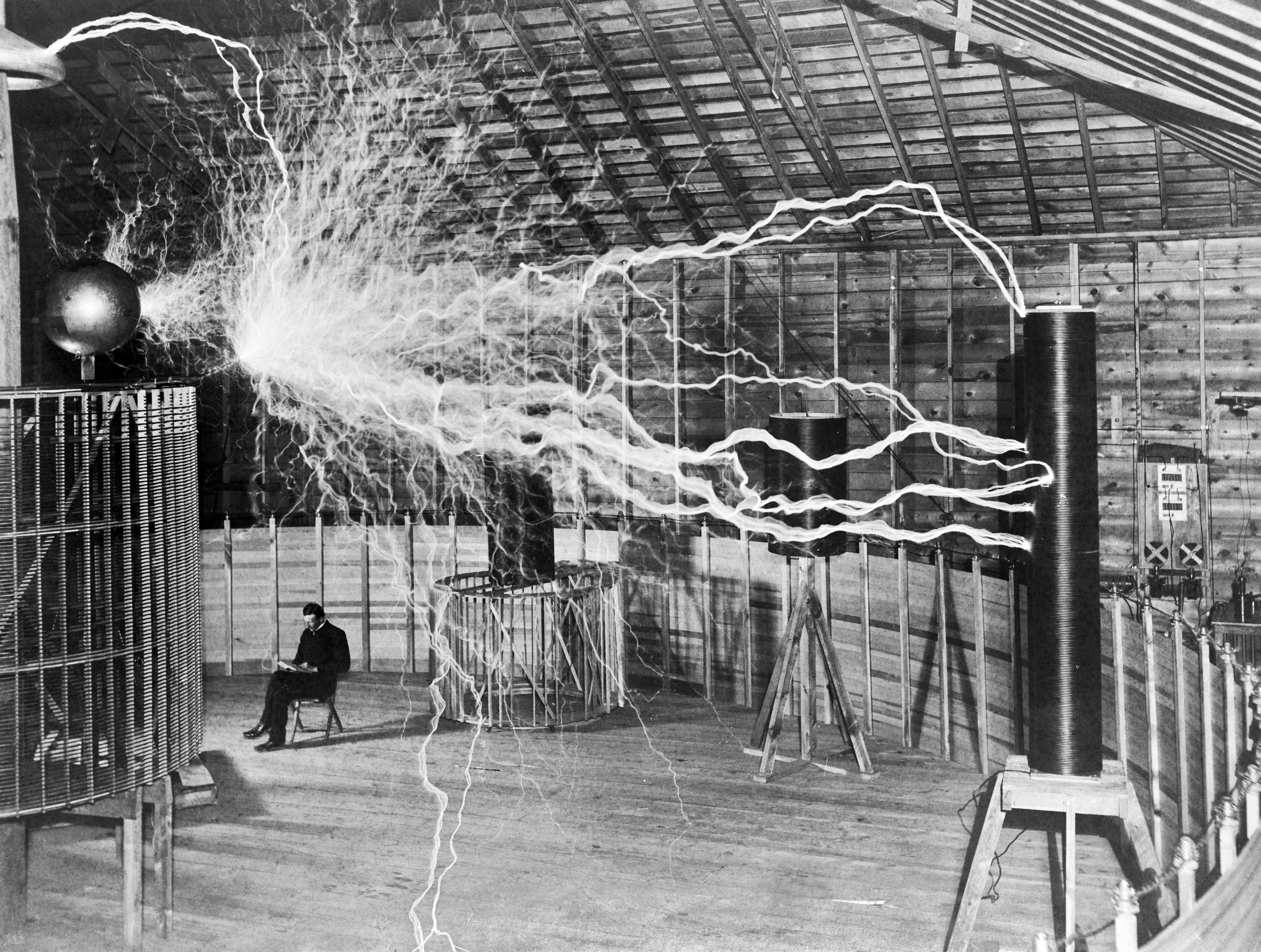
Tesla sits with his "magnifying transmitter" in Colorado Springs in 1899. This photo was taken for his 1900 Century Magazine article, as a double exposure where Tesla was not in the room when the device was operating.

Tesla was back in New York in January 1900. He had convinced his friend Robert Underwood Johnson, editor of The Century Magazine, to allow him to publish an article covering his work and Johnson had even sent a photographer to Colorado Springs the previous year to photograph Tesla's experiments. The article written by Tesla, titled "The Problem of Increasing Human Energy", appeared in the June 1900 edition of Century Magazine.

Instead of the understandable scientific description Johnson had hoped for, it was more of a lengthy philosophical treatise where Tesla described his futuristic ideas on harnessing the sun's energy, control of the weather with electricity, wireless control, and how future inventions would make war impossible. It also contained what were to become iconic images by photographer Dickenson Alley of Tesla and his Colorado Springs experiments.

Tesla made the rounds in New York trying to find investors for his system of wireless transmission, wining and dining them at the Waldorf-Astoria's Palm Garden (the hotel where he was living at the time), The Players Club and Delmonico's. Tesla first went to his old friend George Westinghouse for help. Westinghouse seemed like a natural fit for the project given the large-scale AC equipment Westinghouse Electric manufactured and Tesla's need for similar equipment.

Tesla asked Westinghouse to "meet me on some fair terms in furnishing me the machinery, retaining the ownership of the same and interesting yourself to a certain extent". Though Westinghouse declined to buy into the project, he did agree to lend Tesla $6,000 ($232,200 in 2025). Westinghouse suggested Tesla pursue some of the rich venture capitalists. Tesla talked to John Jacob Astor, Thomas Fortune Ryan, and even sent a cabochon sapphire ring as a gift to Henry O. Havemeyer. No investment was forthcoming from Havemeyer and Ryan, but Astor did buy 500 shares in Tesla's company. Tesla gained the attention of financier J. P. Morgan in November 1900.

Morgan was impressed by Guglielmo Marconi's feat of sending reports from the America's Cup yacht races off Long Island back to New York City via radio the previous year, but he was dubious about the feasibility and patent priority of Tesla's system.

In several discussions, Tesla assured Morgan his system was superior to, and based on patents that superseded, that of Marconi and of other wireless inventors, and that it would far outpace the performance of its main competitor, the transatlantic telegraph cable. Morgan signed a contract with Tesla in March 1901, agreeing to give the inventor $150,000 ($5.81 million in 2025) to develop and build a wireless station on Long Island, capable of sending wireless messages to London as well as ships at sea. The deal also included Morgan having a 51% interest in the company as well as a 51% share in present and future wireless patents developed from the project.

=== Design changes and financial problems ===
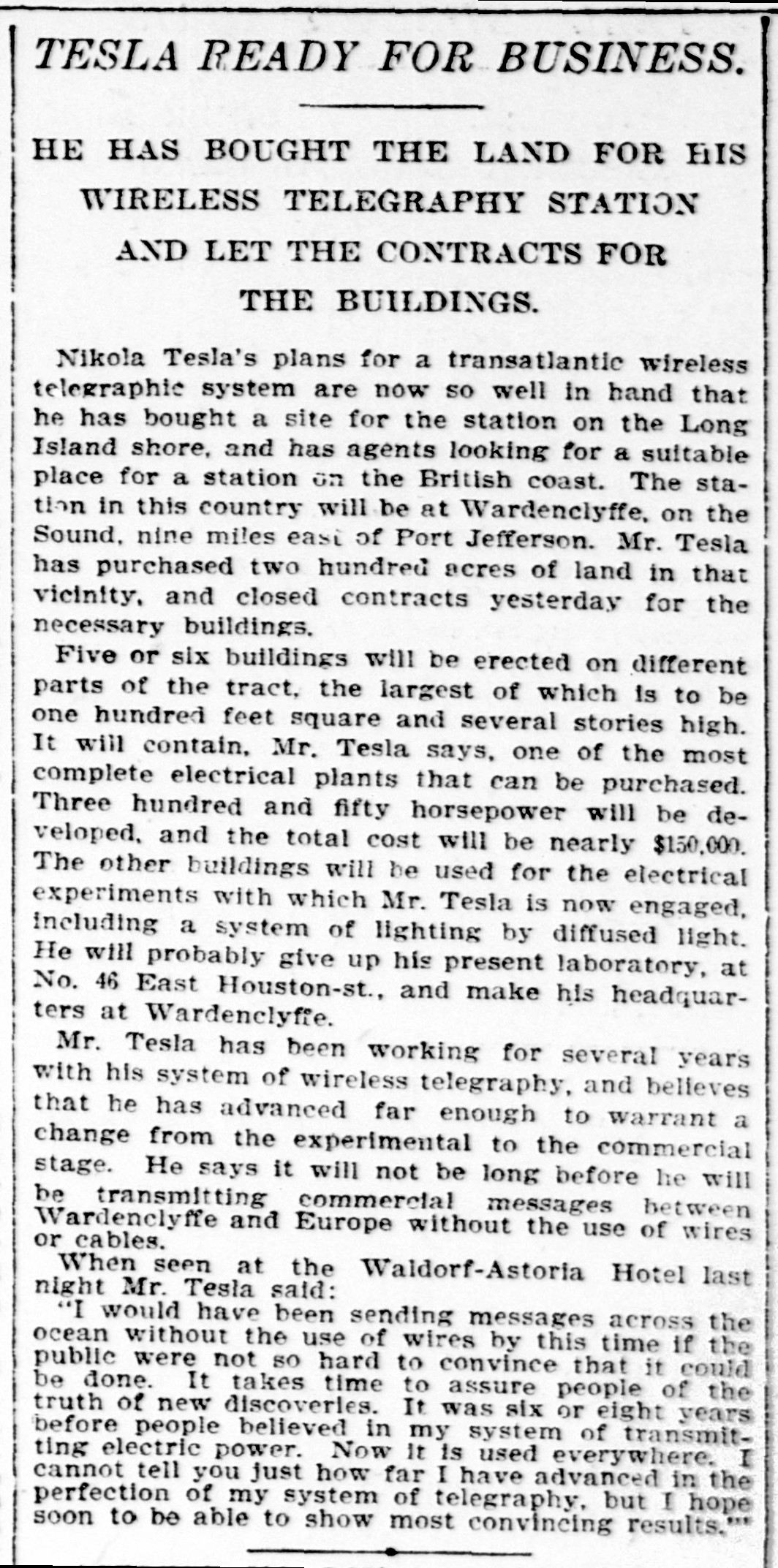
"Tesla Ready for Business", a New-York Tribune article on August 7, 1901

Tesla began working on his wireless station immediately. As soon as the contract was signed with Morgan in March 1901, he placed an order for generators and transformers with Westinghouse Electric. Tesla's plans changed radically after he read a June 1901 Electrical Review article by Marconi titled "Syntonic Wireless Telegraph".

At this point, Marconi was transmitting radio signals beyond the range most physicists thought possible (over the horizon) and the description of the Italian inventor's use of a "Tesla coil" "connected to the Earth" led Tesla to believe Marconi was copying his earth resonance system to do it. Tesla, believing a small pilot system capable of sending Morse code yacht race results to Morgan in Europe would not be able to capture the attention of potential investors, decided to scale up his designs with a much more powerful transmitter, incorporating his ideas of advanced telephone and image transmission as well as his ideas of wireless power delivery.

In July 1901, Tesla informed Morgan of his planned changes to the project and the need for much more money to build it. He explained the more grandiose plan as a way to leap ahead of competitors and secure much larger profits on the investment. With Tesla basically proposing a breach of contract, Morgan refused to lend additional funds and demanded an account of money already spent. Tesla claimed a few years later that funds were also running short because of Morgan's role in triggering the stock market Panic of 1901, making everything Tesla had to buy much more expensive.

Morgan stated no additional funds would be supplied, but Tesla continued with the project. He explored the idea of building several small towers or a tower 300 feet (91 m) and even 600 feet (180 m) tall to transmit the type of low-frequency longwaves that Tesla thought were needed to resonate the Earth. His friend, architect Stanford White, who was working on designing structures for the project, calculated that a 600-foot tower would cost $450,000 ($17.4 million in 2025) and the idea had to be canceled.

== Plant at Wardenclyffe ==
Tesla purchased 200 acres (81 ha) of land close to a railway line 65 miles (105 km) from New York City in Shoreham on Long Island Sound from land developer James S. Warden who was building a resort community known as Wardenclyffe-On-Sound. Tesla would later state his plans were to eventually make Wardenclyffe a hub "city" in his plans for a worldwide system of 30 wireless plants, sending messages and media content and broadcasting electrical power. The land surrounding the Wardenclyffe plant was intended to be what Tesla would later in life refer to as a "radio city" with factories producing Tesla's patented devices. Warden expected to build housing on the part of his remaining land for the expected 2,000–2,500 Tesla employees. At the end of July 1901 Tesla closed a contract for the building of the wireless telegraph plant and electrical laboratory at Wardenclyffe.

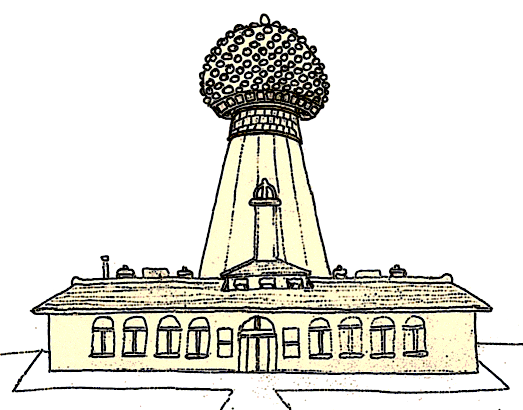
This artistic representation of the station completed includes the tower structure.

The final design Tesla started building at Wardenclyffe consisted of a wood-framed tower 186 feet (57 m) tall and the cupola 68 feet (21 m) in diameter. It had a 55-ton steel (some report it was a better conducting material, such as copper) hemispherical structure at the top (referred to as a cupola). The structure was such as to allow each piece to be taken out and replaced as necessary.

The main building occupied the rest of the facility grounds. Stanford White designed the Wardenclyffe facility main building. It included a laboratory area, instrumentation room, boiler room, generator room and machine shop. Inside the main building, there were electromechanical devices, electrical generators, electrical transformers, glass blowing equipment, X-ray devices, Tesla coils, a remote controlled boat, cases with bulbs and tubes, wires, cables, a library, and an office. It was constructed in the style of the Italian Renaissance. The tower was designed by W.D. Crow, an associate of White.

There was a great deal of construction under the tower to establish some form of ground connection, but Tesla and his workers kept the public and the press away from the project, so little is known. The descriptions (some from Tesla's 1923 testimony in foreclosure proceedings on the property) include that the facility had a ten by twelve foot wood and steel lined shaft sunk into the ground 120 feet (37 m) beneath the tower with a stairway inside it. Tesla stated that at the bottom of the shaft he "had special machines rigged up which would push the iron pipe, one length after another, and I pushed these iron pipes, I think sixteen of them, three hundred feet, and then the current through these pipes takes hold of the earth." In Tesla's words, the function of this was "to have a grip on the earth so the whole of this globe can quiver". There is also contemporaneous and later descriptions of four 100 foot long tunnels, possibly brick lined and waterproofed, radiating from the bottom of the shaft north, south, east, and west terminating back at ground level in little brick igloos. Speculation on the tunnels ranges from them being for drainage, acting as access ways, or having the function of enhancing ground connection or resonance by interacting with the water table below the tower, maybe via being filled with salt water or liquid nitrogen.

The Tesla biographer John Joseph O'Neill noted the cupola at the top of the 186-foot tower had a 5-foot hole in its top where ultraviolet lights were to be mounted, perhaps to create an ionized path up through the atmosphere that could conduct electricity. How Tesla intended to employ the ground conduction method and atmospheric method in Wardenclyffe's design is unknown. Power for the entire system was to be provided by a coal fired 200 kilowatt Westinghouse alternating current industrial generator.

Construction began in September 1901 but money was so short (with Morgan still owing Tesla the remainder of the original $150,000 promised) Tesla complained in a letter to White he was facing foreclosure. Tesla kept writing Morgan letters pleading for more money and assuring the financier his wireless system would be superior to Marconi's, but in December Tesla's plans were dealt another serious blow when Marconi announced to the world he was able to send a wireless transmission (the Morse code for the letter S) across the Atlantic.

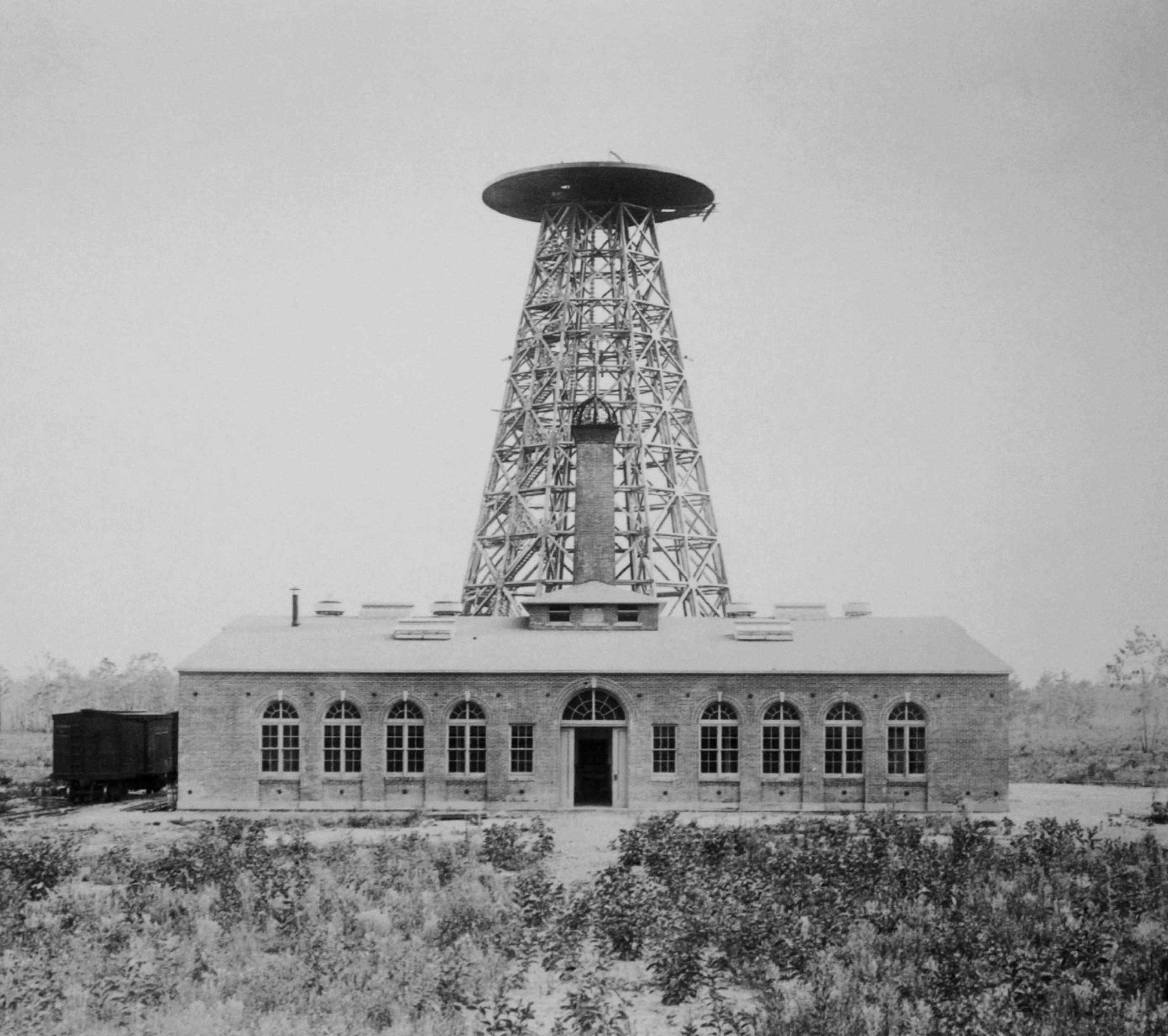
Tesla's Wardenclyffe plant on Long Island c. 1902 in partial stage of completion. Work on the 55-foot-diameter (17 m) cupola had not yet begun. There is a boxcar parked next to the building.

Construction at Wardenclyffe continued in 1902 and that June Tesla began moving his laboratory operations from 46 East Houston Street laboratory to the 94-foot-square brick building at Wardenclyffe. By the end of 1902 the tower reached its full height of 187 feet. What Tesla was doing at Wardenclyffe and the site itself was generally kept from the public. Tesla would respond to reporters inquiries stating there was a similar wireless plant in Scotland and that "We have been sending wireless messages for long distances from this station for some time, but whether we are going into the telegraph field on a commercial basis I cannot say at present."

Tesla continued to write to Morgan asking the investor to reconsider his position on the contract and invest the additional funds the project needed. In a July 3, 1903 letter Tesla wrote "Will you help me or let my great work — almost complete — go to pots?" Morgan's reply on July 14 was "I have received your letter and in reply would say that I should not feel disposed at present to make any further advances". The night of Morgan's reply, and several nights after, newspapers reported that the Wardenclyffe tower came alive shooting off bright flashes lighting up the night sky. No explanation was forthcoming from Tesla or any of his workers as to the meaning of the display and Wardenclyffe never seemed to operate again.

Tesla's finances continued to unravel. Investor money on Wall Street was continuing to flow to Marconi's system, which was making regular transmissions, and doing it with equipment far less expensive than the "wireless plant" Tesla was attempting to build. Some in the press began turning against Tesla's project claiming it was a hoax and the "rich man's panic" of late 1903 on Wall Street reduced investment further. Some money came from Thomas Fortune Ryan but the funds went towards the debt on the project instead of funding any further construction. Investors seemed to be shying away from putting money into a project that J. P. Morgan had abandoned. Tesla continued to write Morgan trying to get extra funding stating his "knowledge and ability [...] if applied effectively would advance the world a century". Morgan would only reply through his secretary saying "it will be impossible for [me/ Morgan] to do anything in the matter". Tesla's attempts to raise money by getting the US Navy interested in his remote control boat and torpedo and other attempts to commercialize his inventions went nowhere. In May 1905, Tesla's patents on alternating current motors and other methods of power transmission expired, halting royalty payments and causing a further severe reduction of funding to the Wardenclyffe Tower. In an attempt to find alternative funding Tesla advertised the services of the Wardenclyffe facility but he was met with little success.

=== Abandonment ===
In 1906, the financial problems and other events may have led to what Tesla biographer Marc J. Seifer suspects was a nervous breakdown on Tesla's part. In June architect Stanford White was murdered by Harry Kendall Thaw over White's affair with Thaw's wife, actress Evelyn Nesbit. In October long time investor William Rankine died of a heart attack. George Scherff, Tesla's chief manager who had been supervising Wardenclyffe, had to leave to find other employment. The people living around Wardenclyffe noticed the Tesla plant seemed to have been abandoned without notice.

In 1904, Tesla took out a mortgage on the Wardenclyffe property with George C. Boldt, proprietor of the Waldorf-Astoria Hotel, to cover Tesla's living expenses at the hotel. In 1908 Tesla procured a second mortgage from Boldt to further cover expenses. The facility was partially abandoned around 1911, and the tower structure deteriorated. Between 1912 and 1915, Tesla's finances unraveled, and when the funders wanted to know how they were going to recoup their investments, Tesla was unable to give satisfactory answers.

The March 1, 1916 edition of the publication Export American Industries ran a story titled "Tesla's Million Dollar Folly" describing the abandoned Wardenclyffe site:

There everything seemed left as for a day — chairs, desks, and papers in businesslike array. The great wheels seemed only awaiting Monday life. But the magic word has not been spoken, and the spell still rests on the great plant.

By mid-1917 the facility's main building was breached and vandalized.

=== Demolition ===
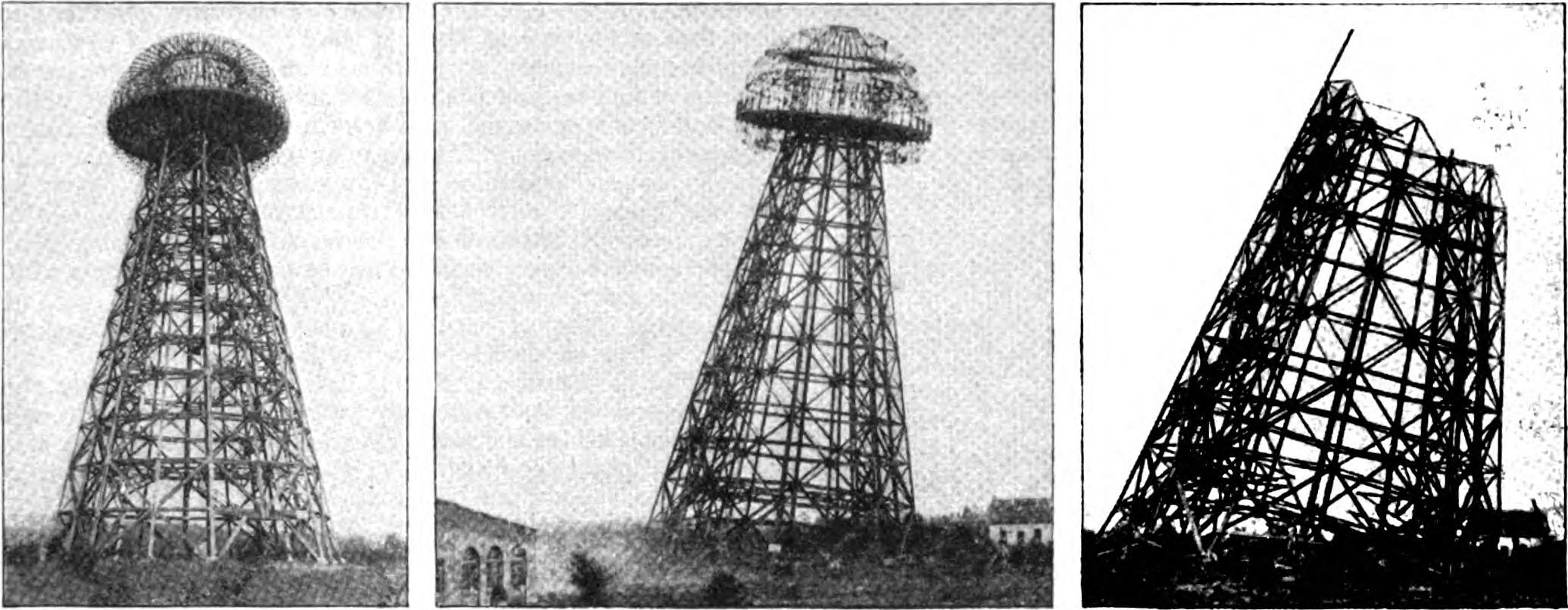
Demolition of the Wardenclyffe tower started in July 1917.

By 1915, Tesla's accumulated debt at the Waldorf-Astoria was around US$20,000 (equivalent to $637,000 in 2025). When Tesla was unable to make any further payments on the mortgages, Boldt foreclosed on the Wardenclyffe property. Boldt went on to make the property available for sale and decided to demolish the tower for scrap. On July 4, 1917, the Smiley Steel Company of New York began demolition of the tower by dynamiting it. The tower was knocked on a tilt by the initial explosion but it was not totally demolished until September. The scrap value realized was $1,750 (equivalent to $44,000 in 2025).

Since this was during World War I a rumor spread, picked up by newspapers and other publications, that the tower was demolished on orders of the United States Government with claims German spies were using it as a radio transmitter or observation post, or that it was being used as a landmark for German submarines. Tesla was not pleased with what he saw as attacks on his patriotism via the rumors about Wardenclyffe, but since the original mortgages with Boldt as well as the foreclosure had been kept off the public record in order to hide his financial difficulties, Tesla was not able to reveal the real reason for the demolition.

On April 20, 1922, Tesla lost an appeal of judgment on Boldt's original foreclosure.

== Post-Tesla era ==
In 1925, the property ownership was transferred to Walter L. Johnson of Brooklyn. On March 6, 1939, Plantacres, Inc. purchased the facility's land and subsequently leased it to Peerless Photo Products, Inc.

AGFA Corporation bought the property from Peerless and used the site from 1969 to 1992 before closing the facility. The site has undergone a final cleanup of waste produced during its Photo Products era. The clean up was conducted under the scrutiny of the New York State Department of Environmental Conservation, and paid for by AGFA.

In 2009, AGFA put the property up for sale for $1,650,000. The main building remains standing to this day; AGFA advertised that the land can "be delivered fully cleared and level." It says it spent $5 million through September 2008 cleaning up silver and cadmium. A non-profit preservation organization supported by The Oatmeal purchased the land in 2013 with hopes to create a museum to Tesla there.

=== Landmarking ===
On February 14, 1967, the nonprofit public benefit corporation Brookhaven Town Historical Trust was established. It selected the Wardenclyffe facility to be designated as a historic site and as the first site to be preserved by the Trust on March 3, 1967. The Brookhaven Town Historic Trust was rescinded by resolution on February 1, 1972. There were never any appointments made after a legal opinion was received; it was never set up properly. On July 7, 1976, a plaque from Yugoslavia was installed by representatives from Brookhaven National Laboratory near the entrance of the building. It reads:

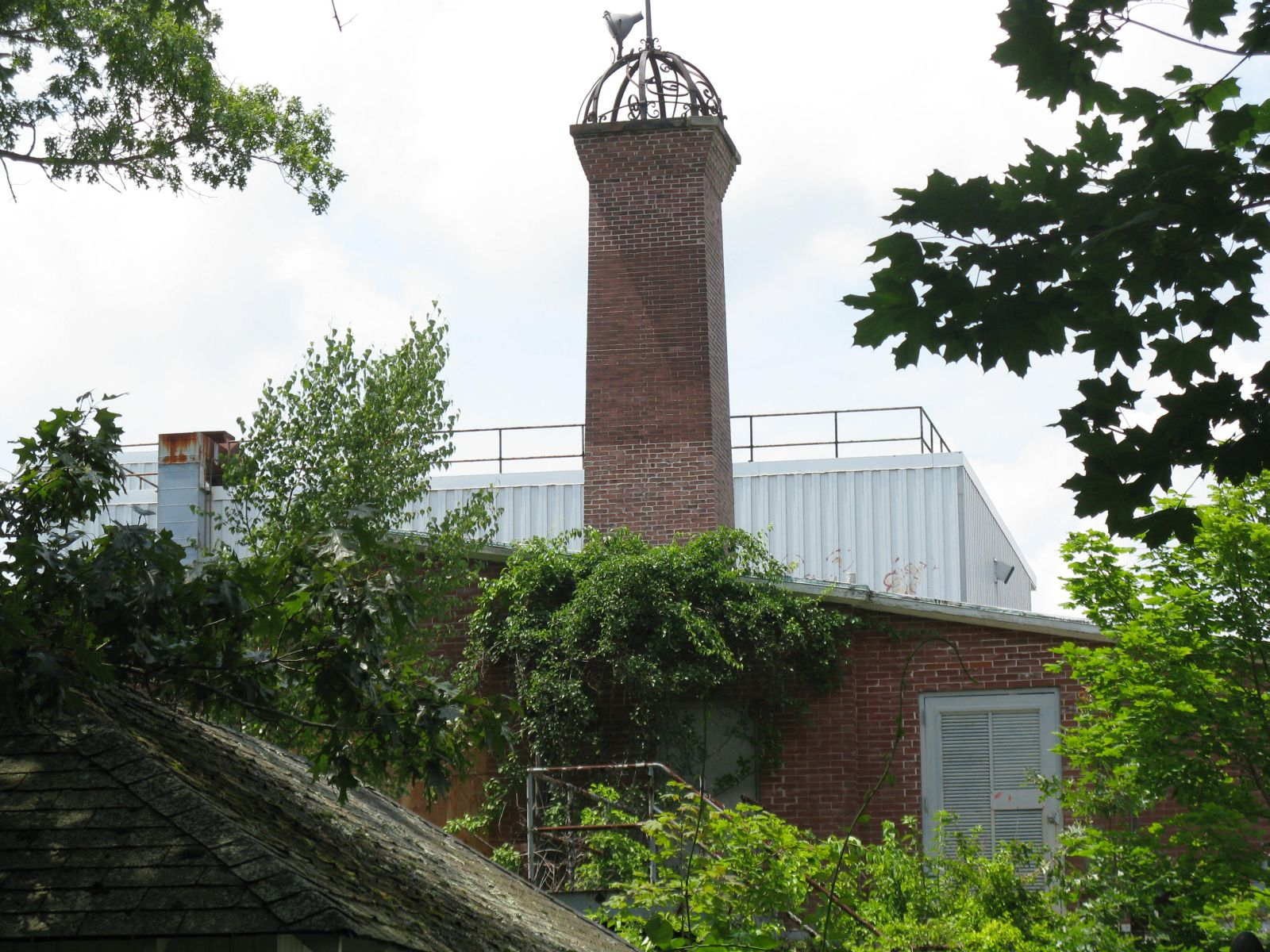
The Stanford White Building is at the corner of Tesla Street and NY 25A (2009).

IN THIS BUILDING
DESIGNED BY STANFORD WHITE, ARCHITECT
NIKOLA TESLA
BORN SMILJAN, YUGOSLAVIA 1856—DIED NEW YORK, U.S.A. 1943
CONSTRUCTED IN 1901–1905 WARDENCLYFFE
HUGE RADIO STATION WITH ANTENNA TOWER
187 FEET HIGH /DESTROYED 1917/, WHICH
WAS TO HAVE SERVED AS HIS FIRST WORLD
COMMUNICATIONS SYSTEM.
IN MEMORY OF 120TH ANNIVERSARY OF TESLA'S BIRTH
AND 200TH ANNIVERSARY OF THE U.S.A INDEPENDENCE

July 10, 1976

The sign was stolen from the property in November 2009. An anonymous benefactor is offering a $2,000 reward if it is returned to the property.

In 1976, an application was filed to nominate the main building for listing on the National Register of Historic Places (NRHP). It failed to get approval. The Tesla Wardenclyffe Project, Incorporated was established in 1994 for the purpose of seeking placement of the Wardenclyffe laboratory-office building and the Tesla tower foundation on both the New York State and NRHP. Its mission is the preservation and adaptive reuse of Wardenclyffe, the century-old laboratory of electrical pioneer Nikola Tesla located in Shoreham, Long Island, New York.

In October 1994, a second application for formal nomination was filed. The New York State Office of Parks, Recreation and Historic Preservation conducted inspections and determined the facility meets New York State criteria for historic designation. A second visit was made on February 25, 2009. The site cannot be registered until it is nominated by a willing owner.

Designation of the structure as a National Landmark is awaiting completion of plant decommissioning activities by its present owner.

=== Museum ===
In August 2012, concerned about an apparent offer to purchase the site and develop it for commercial use, web cartoon The Oatmeal launched a fundraiser for the Tesla Science Center at Wardenclyffe to raise $1.7 million to purchase the property, with the hope of eventually building a museum on the grounds.

Jane Alcorn, president of the nonprofit group The Tesla Science Center at Wardenclyffe, and Matthew Inman, creator of The Oatmeal, collaborated in 2012 to honor "the Father of the Electric Age", by preserving the Wardenclyffe facility as a science center and museum. They initiated the Let's Build a Goddamn Tesla Museum fund-raising campaign on the Indiegogo crowdfunding site, to raise funding to buy the Wardenclyffe property and restore the facility. The project reached its goal of raising $850,000 within a week, more than exceeded the requested amount, including a $33,333 donation from the producers of the Tesla film "Fragments from Olympus-The Vision of Nikola Tesla". The campaign also attracted donations from benefactors such as Elon Musk, CEO of Tesla, Inc.

The money raised within one week was enough to get a matching grant from the state of New York, allowing the project to be able to meet the seller's asking price of $1.6 million; the state had agreed to match donations up to half that amount. A total of $1.37 million was donated, the matching grant from the State of New York brought the total collected to over $2.2 million. The surplus was to be used to fund the cleaning and restoration of the property. Tesla, Wardenclyffe and the museum fundraising effort was the subject of a documentary called Tower to the People – Tesla's Dream at Wardenclyffe Continues.

On May 2, 2013, The Tesla Science Center at Wardenclyffe announced that they had purchased the 15.69-acre laboratory site from Agfa Corporation and will begin to raise "about $10 million to create a science learning center and museum worthy of Tesla and his legacy".

On May 13, 2014, The Oatmeal published a comic called "What It's Like to Own a Model S, Part 2", to request a further donation of $8 million from Tesla Motors owner Elon Musk. The next day, Musk tweeted that he "would be happy to help". On July 10, 2014, during a 158th birthday celebration for Tesla at the Wardenclyffe site, it was announced that Musk would donate $1 million toward funding the museum, and install a Tesla Motors supercharging station onsite.

The center plans to offer several programs, including science teacher associations, conferences, symposia, field trips, associations with science competitions, and other science programs. Planned permanent exhibits include a Tesla exhibit, exploratorium-type exhibits, and a living museum. On September 23, 2013, the President of Serbia, Tomislav Nikolić, unveiled a monument to Tesla at the Wardenclyffe site. Nikolić said that he had planned to push for the monument to be displayed at the United Nations, but chose Wardenclyffe once he learned it had been purchased for the center.

Emergency renovations on the chimney started in February 2020. A ground breaking event took place in June 2023.

== Facility grounds ==
Wardenclyffe is located near the Shoreham Post Office and Shoreham Fire House on Route 25A in Shoreham, Long Island, New York. Wardenclyffe was divided into two main sections. The tower, which was located in the back, and the main building now compose the entire facility grounds. At one time the property was about 200 acres (0.81 km^{2}). Now it consists of slightly less than 16 acres (65,000 m^{2}).

== 2023 fire ==
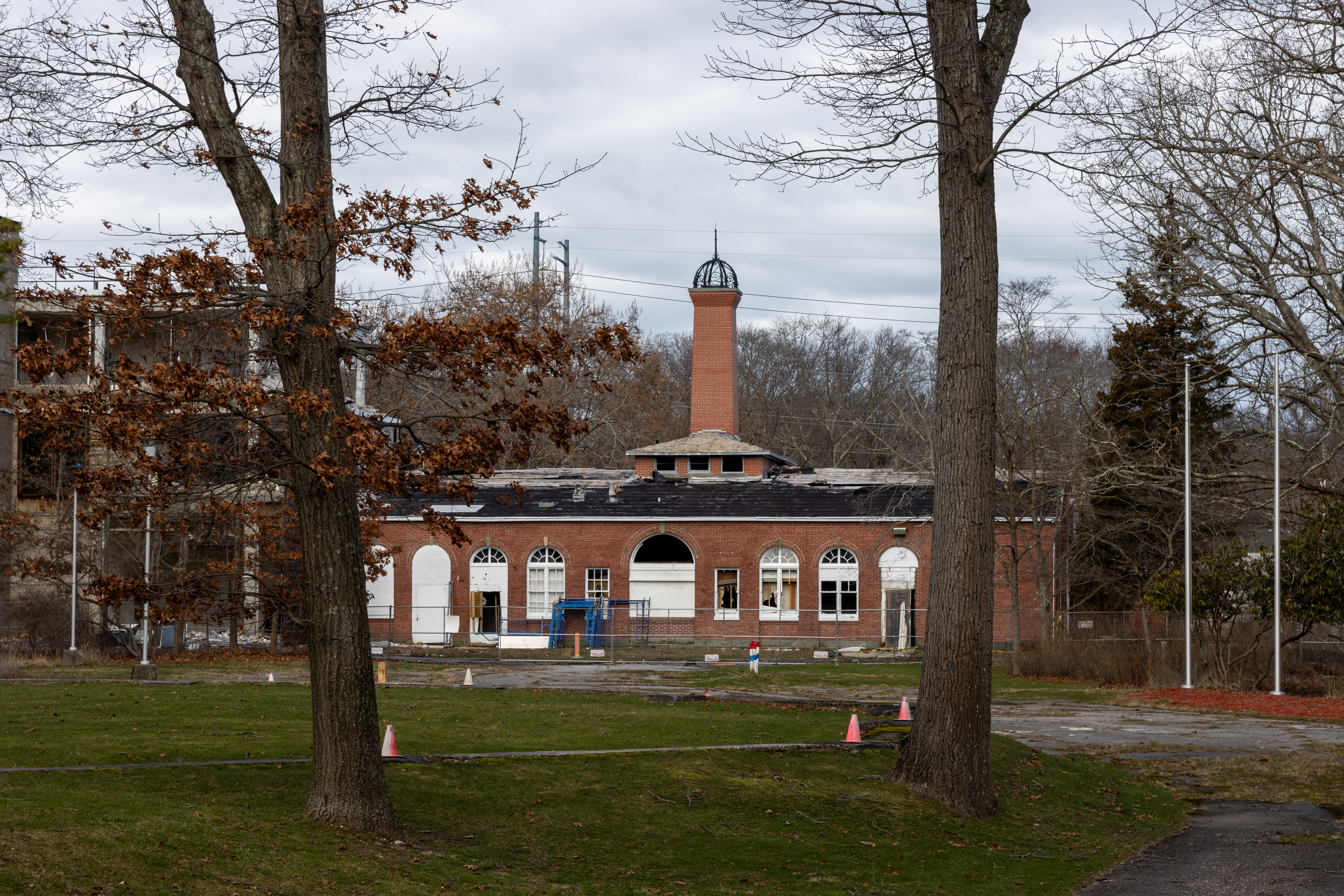
The site in 2024, after the fire, has the former location of the Tower by the cones in the foreground.

On 21 November 2023, just months after the groundbreaking, the laboratory building caught fire. Over 100 firefighters across Long Island helped contain the fire. Much of the original brick building survived.

== Related patents ==
- "Means for Generating Electric Currents", U.S. patent 514,168, February 6, 1894
- "Electrical Transformer", U.S. patent 593,138, November 2, 1897
- "Method Of Utilizing Radiant Energy", U.S. patent 685,958 November 5, 1901
- "Method of Signaling", U.S. patent 723,188, March 17, 1903
- "System of Signaling", U.S. patent 725,605, April 14, 1903
- "Art of Transmitting Electrical Energy Through the Natural Mediums", U.S. patent 787,412, April 18, 1905
- "Apparatus for Transmitting Electrical Energy", January 18, 1902, U.S. patent 1,119,732, December 1, 1914

== See also ==
- Free energy suppression conspiracy theory
- Magnifying transmitter
- National Register of Historic Places listings in Brookhaven (town), New York
- Wireless energy transmission
