= Nikola Tesla in popular culture =

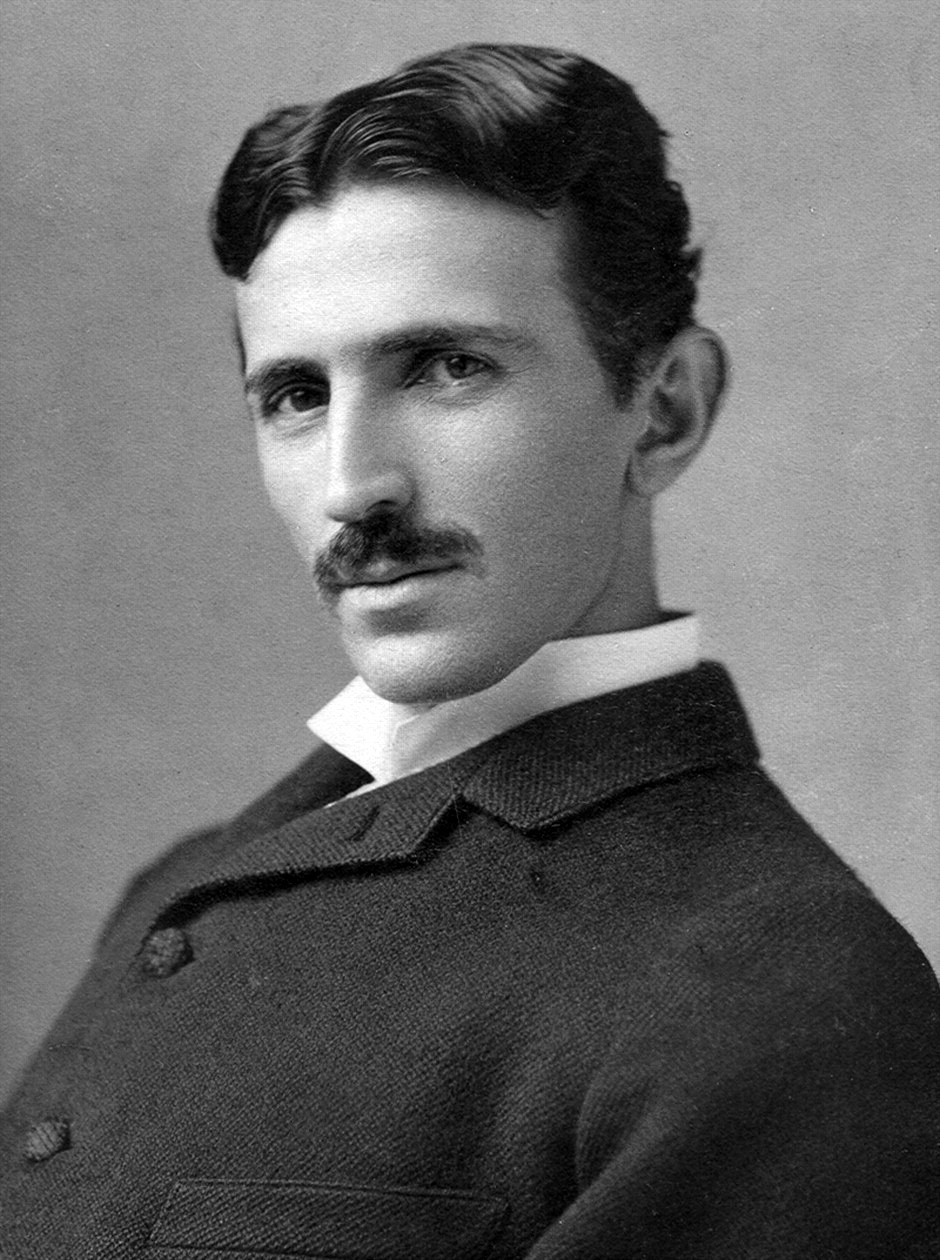
Nikola Tesla in a photograph taken by Napoleon Sarony in the 1890s.

Nikola Tesla (10 July 1856 – 7 January 1943) is portrayed in many forms of popular culture. The Serbian-American engineer has particularly been depicted in science fiction, a genre which is well suited to address his inventions; while often exaggerated, the fictionalized variants build mostly upon his own alleged claims or ideas. A popular, growing fixation among science fiction, comic book, and speculative history storytellers is to portray Tesla as a member of a secret society, along with other luminaries of science. The impacts of the technologies invented by Nikola Tesla are a recurring theme in the steampunk genre of alternate technology science-fiction.

== Board games ==
- In the alternate World War I setting in the board game Tannhäuser, Nikola Tesla is a major figure in the Russian Matriarchy faction, where his inventions have not only been used to create deadly weaponry but also harness the power of otherworldly forces.

== Books ==
=== Appearances ===
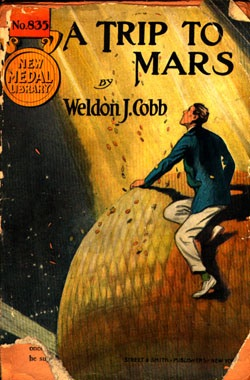
- Edition of To Mars with Tesla; or, The Mystery of Hidden Worlds with the title A Trip to Mars; or, The Spur of Adventure (Street & Smith, 1928)
  Weldon J. Cobb's novel To Mars With Tesla; or, the Mystery of the Hidden World (1901) is an adventure where Tesla, aided by Young Edison (Thomas Edison's fictional nephew) and a couple of scientists, seeks to communicate with Mars. An adaptation of this "lost classic" was published as a Kindle ebook on Tesla's 160th birthday, 10 July 2016.
- In Jacek Dukaj's 2007 novel Ice, Tesla is one of the major characters.
- In geomorphologist and author Sesh Heri's novel Wonder of the Worlds (2005), published by Lost Continent Library, Tesla journeys to Mars with Mark Twain and Harry Houdini to retrieve a stolen crystal and confront Kel, the emperor of the Red Planet, on the eve of the Martian invasion of Earth.
- In Ralph Vaughan's four Sherlock Holmes/H. P. Lovecraft crossovers, The Adventure of the Ancient Gods (1990), The Adventure of the Dreaming Detective (1992), "The Adventure of the Laughing Moonbeast" (1992), and Sherlock Holmes and the Terror Out of Time (2001), Tesla and Professor Challenger play major roles.
- Tesla is one of the main characters in The Tesla Legacy, a novel by Australian author Robert G. Barrett (2006). In the novel, Tesla builds a 'doomsday machine' hidden in the Hunter Valley area of New South Wales that could disrupt all wireless communication on Earth.
- In Ron Horsley's Sherlock Holmes novella, The Polyphase-Powered Man (2002).Tesla is the narrator and "Watson proxy".
- The Invention of Everything Else, by Samantha Hunt (2008), is a novel blending fact with fiction. It centers on the relationship between Nikola Tesla and a maid at the New Yorker Hotel.
- Tesla is an important supporting character in Christopher Priest's 1995 novel The Prestige (he is portrayed in Christopher Nolan's 2006 film adaptation by David Bowie). In the story, Tesla builds a machine that is intended to enable physical teleportation for use in the stage act of magician Robert Angier. The machine is flawed, and merely creates a duplicate of the original item or person. Tesla improves the machine, but warns Angier to destroy it. His mountain laboratory is destroyed by Edison's henchmen and Tesla is forced to leave Colorado Springs, Colorado.
- The 2011 novel Goliath by Scott Westerfeld depicts Tesla when the crew of the airship Leviathan come across the blast zone of the Tunguska event. Tesla had come to the site to research the blast and claims it was caused by a weapon created by him, the Goliath. Towards the end of the book it is revealed that the event was caused by a meteor after all, but Tesla was too unhinged to believe it.
- Paul Malmont's 2011 novel The Astounding, the Amazing, and the Unknown launches during World War II with a dying Tesla secreting the key to a mysterious device called Wardenclyffe Tower. The tower ultimately excites the interest the staff at the "Philadelphia Experiment" U.S. Navy laboratory. The staff members include Robert Heinlein, L. Ron Hubbard, Isaac Asimov and L. Sprague de Camp.
- Nikola Tesla is a member of a fellowship of vampire hunters set in the year 1888 in the novel Modern Marvels - Viktoriana (2013) written by Wayne Reinagel. The fellowship includes Mary Shelley, Edgar Allan Poe, Jules Verne, Bram Stoker, Arthur Conan Doyle, H. G. Wells, Harry Houdini and H. Rider Haggard.
- Seth Grahame-Smith's novel The Last American Vampire (2015), Tesla plays a supporting role; he aids the protagonist in the assassination of Rasputin.
- In Spider Robinson's 1992 novel Lady Slings the Booze, Nikola Tesla has been brought forward in time (and possibly been rejuvenated) and is resident in Lady Sally's House. Among other things, he has rigged every light in the building to operate off broadcast power.
- In Graham Moore's novel The Last Days of Night (2016), which is about the current wars of the 1880s and 1890s, Tesla features as a major character.
- In The Accelerati Trilogy by Neal Shusterman and Eric Elfman (2014–2016), Tesla's secret inventions are rediscovered. The race is on to solve the uses of the inventions and stop an extinction level event.
- In S. M. Stirling's alternate history Black Chamber series (2018 —) Tesla is mentioned as "T", head of the eponymous spy-organization's technical department.

=== Allusions ===
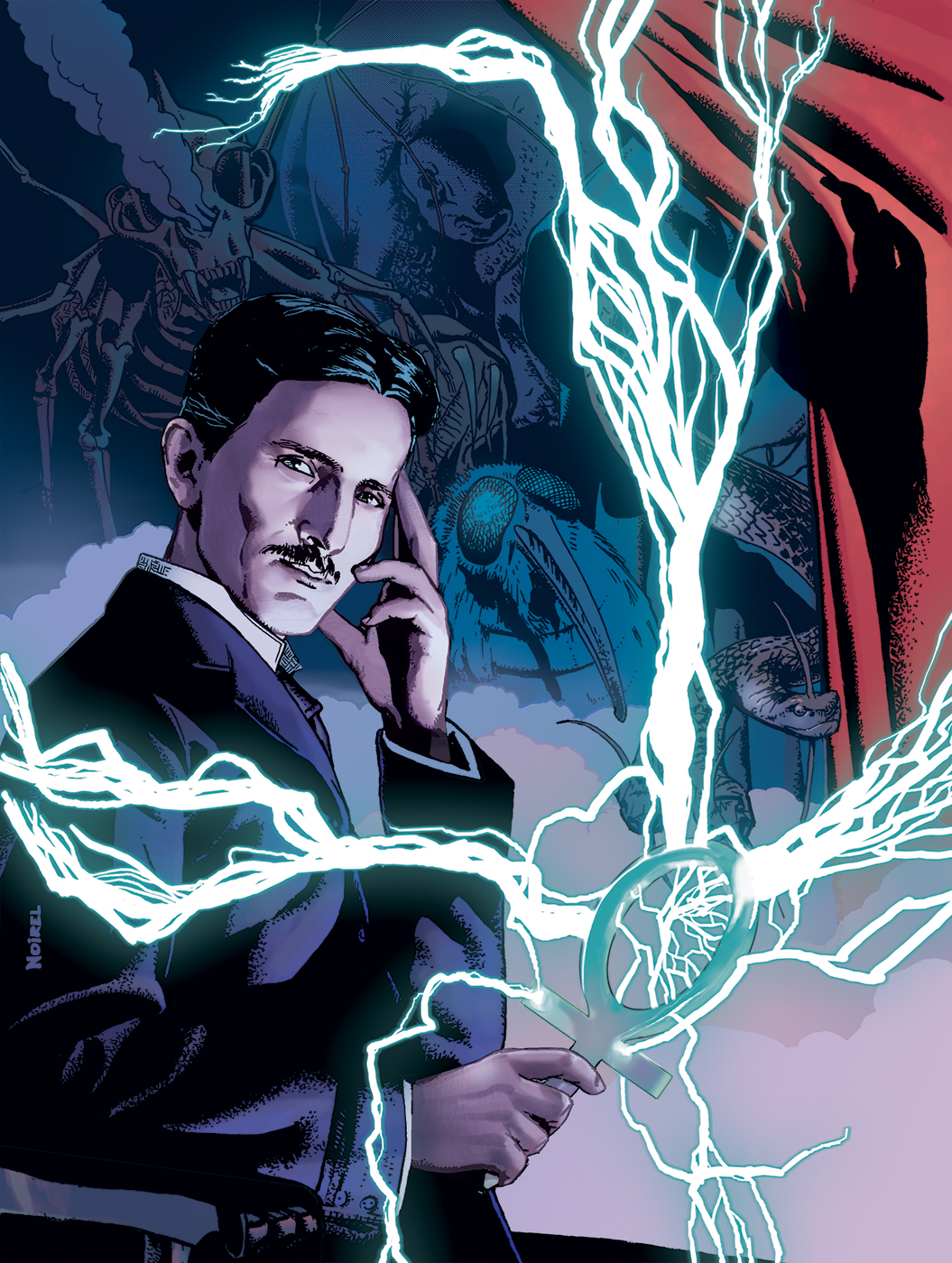
H. P. Lovecraft's character Nyarlathotep in the guise of Tesla in Rotomago and Julien Noirel's comic-book adaptation of the prose poem "Nyarlathotep".

- Some researchers have suggested that the character of Nyarlathotep in H P Lovecraft's short story "Nyarlathotep" (1920), was inspired by Tesla.

== Comics and graphic novels ==
=== Appearances ===
- In The Light and Darkness War (1988–89) by Tom Veitch and Cam Kennedy, Tesla appears as a supporting character who has been transported, upon death, to another dimension where other deceased human warriors and scientists, such as Leonardo da Vinci, are engaged in a never-ending battle against the forces of Outer Darkness. A biography of Tesla featured in the second issue in order to introduce Tesla to contemporary readers unfamiliar with the scientist.
- In the eight-issue Serbian comic book series Generation Tesla (1995), created by writer Milan Konjević, and artists Siniša Radović and Zdravko Zupan, Tesla evades his own death by transferring himself to another plane of existence. In 2020, he resurrects a number of humans slain by the evil Kobalt, transforming them into superhumans who can counter the threats of such villains. He is founder and mentor of super-hero team Generation Tesla.
- In Matt Fraction and Steven Sanders' graphic novel The Five Fists of Science (2006), Tesla teams up with Mark Twain to battle Thomas Edison.
- The Inventor: The Story of Tesla (2012) written by Ravé Mehta with art by Erik Williams, is a graphic novel based on the story of Nikola Tesla. It begins with Tesla's birth in Smiljan, continues through Tesla's battle with Thomas Edison during the war of the currents, and ends when J.P. Morgan pulls the plug on Tesla's Wardenclyffe Tower project. Other major characters in the graphic novel are George Westinghouse, Mark Twain, Guglielmo Marconi, Lord Kelvin, U.S. President Herbert Hoover, and Swami Vivekananda.
- JLA: Age of Wonder (2003) is a two-issue mini-series from DC Comics' Elseworlds line, in which Superman lands in Kansas in the 1850s and emerges on the world stage at the 1876 Centennial Exposition. He teams up with Edison but ends up working with Tesla, who eventually deploys a death ray during World War I.
- In Jeff Smith's comic book series Rasl, Tesla's ideas are prominently featured as the foundation of travel between alternate realities. The story also features an alternate take on Tesla's biography and uses his journals as a plot device.
- Red Giant Entertainment's comic book series Tesla features Nikola Tesla as he uses his greatest inventions to battle against a shadowy organization of the planet's most brilliant minds, who are bent on world domination.
- Brian Clevinger and Scott Wegener's Atomic Robo is a comic book series about a robot that was invented by Nikola Tesla, which also features fictionalised representations of other scientists such as Carl Sagan and Thomas Edison.

=== Allusions ===
- Although Nikola Tesla doesn't make a direct appearance in the comic book series The League of Extraordinary Gentlemen by Alan Moore and Kevin O'Neill, it is implied very early on that Tesla (and also Thomas Edison) is responsible for some of the steampunk technology seen in the series. A circuit breaker on the last page of Empire Dreams, the first issue of Volume 1 bears the logo "Edison Teslaton".

== Companies ==
- Tesla, Inc. and Nikola Motor Company are both named after Nikola Tesla.

== Events and holidays ==
=== Nikola Tesla Day ===
Tesla's birthday, 10 July, is celebrated by some as World Tesla Day, Nikola Tesla Day, or simply, Tesla Day. Some organizations celebrate Tesla Day informally on 10 July. However, The Tesla Memorial Society wrote letters to several officials asking to commemorate 10 July as international Nikola Tesla Day.

Tesla's birthday (or in one case, both the day itself and the week leading up to it) is officially celebrated as a holiday in various parts of the world. In Serbia, 10 July is celebrated as the National Day of Science. In Croatia, it is called Nikola Tesla Day. In Niagara Falls, Canada, it is named as the Day of Nikola Tesla. In the autonomous province of Vojvodina in Serbia, the local Association of Teachers also officially celebrate 10 July as the Day of Nikola Tesla though in practice, the celebrations last the seven days (one week) from 4 July to 10 July inclusive.

Google honored Tesla on his birthday on 10 July 2009 by displaying a Google Doodle in the Google search home page, that showed the G as a Tesla coil.

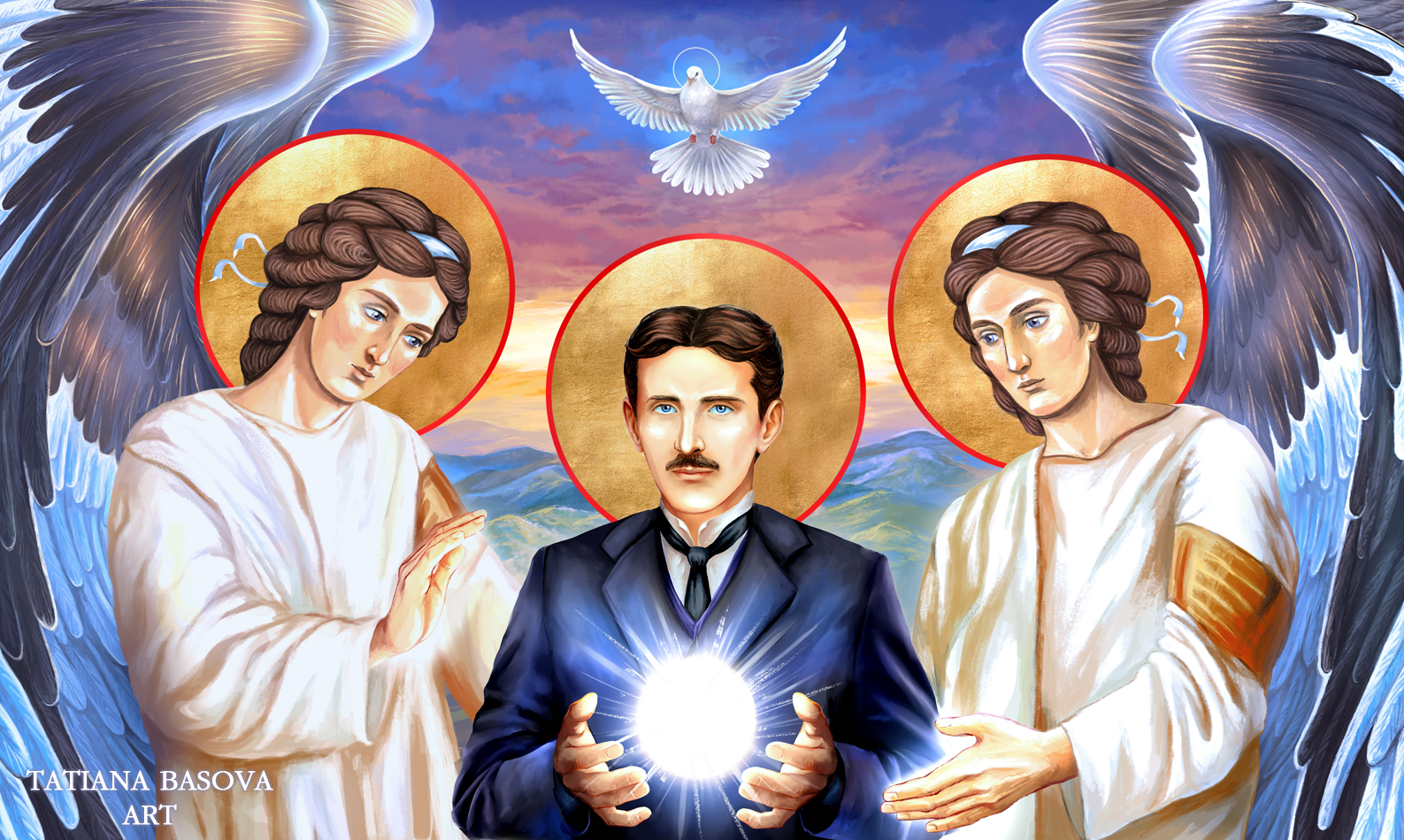
Saint Tesla (2021) by Tatiana Basova, inspired by the proposal to have Tesla canonized as a saint

On 7 January 2021 (which is both Orthodox Christmas and the anniversary of Nikola Tesla's death), the Tesla Science Foundation Serbia (TSFA) sent a petition to the Holy Synod of the Serbian Orthodox Church proposing that the Synod consider the canonization of Nikola Tesla as an Orthodox saint with his birthday, 10 July as his feast day.

At Tesla Science Center at Wardenclyffe an annual Tesla Expo is held each year near the date of Nikola Tesla Day and celebrates with a STEM festival highlighting Tesla's accomplishments and impact on today's science and technology.

== Film ==
=== Appearances ===
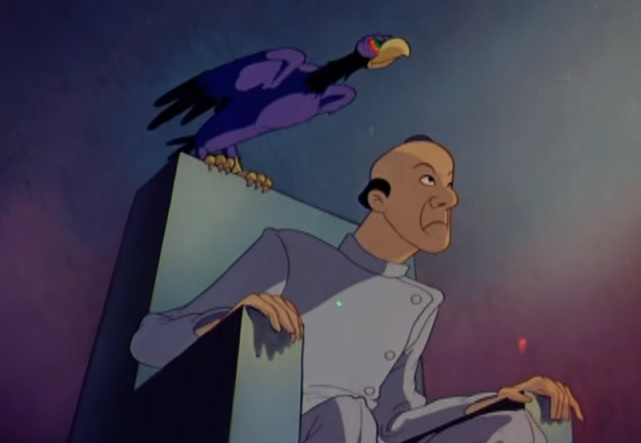
The "Mad Scientist" from The Mad Scientist, the first of Max Fleischer's Superman cartoons, this character said to be inspired by Tesla

Nikola Tesla as depicted in Record of Ragnarok, illustrating a modern fictionalized portrayal of Tesla, serving as a fighter for Humanity against the Gods, where he faces God, Beelzebub.

- In 1941, the first of Max Fleischer's Superman cartoons (titled The Mad Scientist or just Superman) depicted Superman fighting a character named "Mad Scientist", which is very similar to Tesla (a 1999 VHS release of the movie was titled Superman vs. Tesla).
- The Secret of Nikola Tesla (1980; Serbo-Croatian: Tajna Nikole Tesle), a Yugoslav film directed by Krsto Papić and notable for its inclusion of Orson Welles as banking baron J.P. Morgan, touches on Tesla's psychic powers and lost vision of the future.
- David Bowie portrayed Tesla in the movie The Prestige (2006), in which one of the main characters gets Tesla to develop a remarkable electro-replicating device for him.
- An independent Tesla film, Fragments from Olympus-The Vision of Nikola Tesla, producers of the film made news by using part of their budget to make a $33,333 donation to help save Tesla's Wardenclyffe lab during a crowd-funding campaign started by the popular internet comic known as The Oatmeal. The story of Wardenclyffe and the effort to save it was the subject of a documentary from the same filmmakers called Tower to the People – Tesla's Dream at Wardenclyffe Continues in 2014.
- Red Giant Entertainment's Benny Powell was working on a film adaptation of the popular comic book in 2013.
- Tesla – a 2016 documentary film by David Grubin presented on the American Experience series.
- In 2017 American biographical historical film The Current War Tesla is portrayed by Nicholas Hoult. Film is directed by Alfonso Gomez-Rejon and written by Michael Mitnick.
- In 2020, the American biographical/historical/fanciful film Tesla premiered at The Sundance Film Festival. Written and directed by Michael Almereyda, it features Ethan Hawke as Tesla, and Kyle MacLachlan as Thomas Edison.
- Tesla is portrayed by Canadian actor Robert Vilar in Matthew Rankin's 2017 experimental short film The Tesla World Light.
- Tesla Nation, a 2018 documentary film on Serbian Americans
- In Record of Ragnarok (2021 —) by Shinya Umemura and Takumi Fukui, Tesla is depicted as a fighter for humanity.

=== Allusions ===
- Disney's Tomorrowland depicts Nikola Tesla as one of four members (with Thomas Edison, Gustave Eiffel, and Jules Verne) of a group of inventors called Plus Ultra, dedicated to finding dreamers and inventors who wanted to create a better future. Plus Ultra later discovers an alternate dimension in which the titular City of Tomorrow is constructed.
- In Jim Jarmusch's film Coffee and Cigarettes, the vignette "Jack Shows Meg His Tesla Coil" features Jack White of the band The White Stripes praising Tesla's work and showing his bandmate Meg a Tesla coil he built; Jack is also a fan of Tesla in real life.
- The 1986 Science Fiction Comedy The American Way (also known as Riders of the Storm) features a character named "Tesla" (played by Michael J. Pollard), an engineer on an airborne pirate television station.

== Music ==
=== Allusions ===
- The American rock band Tesla is named after Nikola Tesla since 1986. They have referenced his life and works a number of times, such as in their debut album Mechanical Resonance (1986), their second album The Great Radio Controversy (1989) and the song "Edison's Medicine" (and accompanying music video), from their 1991 album Psychotic Supper
- Russian synthpop band Tesla Boy formed in 2008 is named after Tesla.
- Yugoslav rock band Teška Industrija recorded the rock epic "Nikola Tesla" for their 1976 studio album Teška Industrija. In 2017, the band rerecorded the song with singer Goran Karan for the large Tesla exhibit held in Zagreb, Croatia.
- "Tesla Girls" was a 1984 single by English band Orchestral Manoeuvres in the Dark.
- Tesla is the subject of the song "Tesla's Hotel Room" by the American duo The Handsome Family. The song is featured on the duo's 2006 album Last Days of Wonder.
- American metal band The Human Abstract released the album Midheaven (2008), which includes songs referring to Tesla and his struggles.
- Some of lyrics from the 2011 album החבר אני (The Friend Me) by Israeli rock singer Rami Fortis was inspired by the life and works of Tesla. Fortis had dedicated the album to Tesla, and said his works inspired him.
- The electronic dance album RISE (2013) by American electro-pop band Renaiszance is themed after The Inventor: The Story of Tesla graphic novel created by Ravé Mehta. The first single and "I Will Rise" are written to Tesla's story and use edgy electronic Tesla coil sounds and dubstep in the production. RISE was produced by Ravé Mehta and co-written with his sister and Renaiszance lead singer Radha Mehta.
- Tesla is the subject of the song "Tesla" by the American rock band They Might Be Giants which appears on their 2013 album Nanobots, with lyrics covering his involvement in X-rays, AC power, radio, and neon lights. The song also references Tesla's death at the New Yorker Hotel.
- Tesla featured in the official "My Demons" (2013) music video by the American electronic rock group Starset.
- The Norwegian artist Sturle Dagsland released a single in 2013 entitled "Wardenclyffe Auquarium" with reference to Nikola Tesla's Wardenclyffe Tower.

== Online ==
- In the YouTube series Epic Rap Battles of History, in season 2, Tesla is depicted in a rap battle against Thomas Edison. Tesla is portrayed by Dante Cimadamore and his singing voice is provided by both Cimadamore and Nice Peter.
- The Oatmeal, a website created by Matthew Inman, contains a comic explaining "Why Nikola Tesla Was The Greatest Geek Who Ever Lived".
- In the animated series Super Science Friends, a fictional Nikola Tesla is one of the main characters and is voiced by Hayden Finkelshtain.
- In online culture, Tesla's quote regarding the number 369 is thought to refer to the supposed natural vibration of the mind. The body opens counterclockwise, so the mind is also thought to operate in a counter-clockwise current. Some speculate attunement to this frequency may assist in helping their thoughts 'manifest' into their reality, though experts consider this to be pseudoscience.

== Stage productions ==
A number of live theatrical plays based on Tesla's life have been produced and staged worldwide.

=== Opera ===
- Australian composer Constantine Koukias's two-act opera Tesla - Lightning in His Hand, about the life and times of Nikola Tesla, premiered at the 10 Days on the Island Festival in Hobart, Tasmania, in 2003.
- Violet Fire is an opera centered on Tesla, with score by Jon Gibson and libretto by Miriam Seidel. It premiered on July 9-15, 2006 at the National Theater in Belgrade, as part of the celebration of Tesla's 150th birthday.
- The 2021 opera Les Éclairs, by Philippe Hersant, is based on a fictionalized version of Tesla's biography; the Tesla figure is named 'Gregor'.

== Television ==
=== Appearances ===
- Nikola Tesla was a Yugoslav TV series in 1977 which featured Rade Šerbedžija as Tesla, as well as Mustafa Nadarević, Špiro Guberina, Izet Hajdarhodžić, Ljuba Tadić, Ivo Serdar, and a number of other nationally renowned actors.
- Tesla: Master of Lightning, a 2003 documentary by Robert Uth, featuring Stacy Keach as the voice of Tesla.
- Tesla was a crucial character in the pilot episode, "Power" (January 20, 2008), of Canadian television period drama Murdoch Mysteries, in "The Tesla Effect" (June 13, 2010), episode 13 of season 3, in "Murdoch and the Undetectable Man" (January 28, 2019), episode 13 of season 12, and in "Staring Blindly into the Future" (January 13, 2020), episode 11 of season 13. He was played in all episodes by Canadian Ukrainian actor Dmitry Chepovetsky.
- In Sanctuary (2008), a fictional version of Tesla is revealed to have been transformed into a semi-vampire as a result of being injected with vampire blood. He appears to be one of the primary antagonists of the series' first season, but becomes more friendly later on. He is played by actor Jonathon Young.
- In one of the "Drunk History" series of comedy sketches, Duncan Trussell while intoxicated tells a story of Nikola Tesla's life and his encounters with Thomas Edison. Tesla is portrayed in the reenactment by John C. Reilly while Thomas Edison is portrayed by Crispin Glover.
- He is referenced many times on the show Ancient Aliens including an episode called "The Tesla Experiment".
- In 2015, Tesla was a pivotal figure in a science fiction series with four episodes, Nikola Tesla and the End of the World. In 2019, a second season was picked up by CBC Gem. Paul O'Neill plays Tesla. The series won or was nominated for several indie film awards, including grand prize at the Los Angeles New Media Film Festival, 2020.
- The fourth episode of Doctor Who’s series 12 aired in 2020, "Nikola Tesla's Night of Terror", featured Nikola Tesla as portrayed by Goran Višnjić.
- A 2018 non-fiction series on the History Channel called The Tesla Files is based on the life and mysteries surrounding the work of inventor Nikola Tesla.
- Season 4 Episode 10 of MacGyver features John Ales as Tesla, both in a 1922 prologue and an induced dream state MacGyver uses to "meet" Tesla and glean clues to the location of a "superweapon" Tesla built.

=== Allusions ===
- On a 2006 episode of MythBusters titled "Earthquake Machine", hosts Adam Savage and Jamie Hyneman debunked the claim that Tesla's oscillator could be used to create an earthquake.

== Video games ==
- Tesla's proposal of teleforce weapons and the destructive possibilities of massive electric arcs created by tesla coils have inspired many video game designers to incorporate Tesla weapons and armors.
- The asymmetrical horror multiplayer game Identity V developed by Netease released a character named Luca Balsa ( also known as "the Prisoner" ) who shares the same birthday as Tesla. In game, Balsa is characterized as a young and aspiring inventor working as an apprentice under Alva Lorenz, who shares his name with the middle name of Thomas Edison. The two worked together until they had an argument, resulting in Lorenz's accidental death and Balsa's imprisonment.

=== Appearances ===
- In the Command & Conquer Red Alert series of video games, Nikola Tesla is a scientist working for the USSR, and "Tesla" is the name of the technology the Soviets use to generate power and for their lightning-based weapons. Perhaps the most widely known example is the Tesla Coil defense structure, capable of sending short electric arcs towards oncoming units, also in their arsenal are Tesla troopers, who carry portable tesla coil-based weaponry and tesla tanks, which have a large glowing blue sphere that ejects great bolts of electricity (the Red Alert 2 version is a small tracked vehicle with a pair of forward-facing, miniature Tesla coils mounted on a turret).
- Nikola Tesla is also one of the characters in the game Martian Dreams, by Origin, which is part of the Worlds of Ultima series.
- In Frostpunk, an alternate history Nikola Tesla is the founder and leader of Tesla City, a possible location to discover in-game. It appears that Tesla became an authoritarian dictator of his city, exiling many unfit individuals and attempting to shield his city from a perpetual winter using electricity, which ends up killing everyone inside Tesla City. Later, a group of exiles finds and kills him, before the player's scouts bury his body.
- Tesla features in The Order: 1886, and aids the main character in the game set in an alternate history 1886.
- Tesla is one of the main characters in the game Dark Void, where he is kept in an alternate universe, like a 'skin' between universes, to which one can travel through the Bermuda Triangle. He uses his great intelligence to create a huge spaceship called the Ark, kept in another, tropical Earth-like universe called the Void. The Ark can be used by others stranded in the alternate universe to defeat the post-singularity robotic AI that manifests itself as an army of anthropomorphic robots. After defeating the robotic menace, Tesla and the other protagonists return to the 'skin' universe, where Tesla stays to keep his youth and his inventions.
- In the Rockstar Games 2018 title Red Dead Redemption 2, Tesla is paid homage to with a character called “Marko Dragic”. In the game, the player meets Dragic in the town of Saint Denis where he is convincing investors to invest in his work on electromagnetic waves, showing off a remotely controlled boat. A later mission entails the player helping Dragic set up a series of lightning rods, assisting Dragic in the activation of an automaton, and a return to the laboratory uncovers a deceased Marko Dragic, and awarding the player with the “Artificial Intelligence” achievement or trophy. Exploration into the mountain region will allow the player to find the automaton sitting on the edge of a mountain, regretting its transgressions.
- Tesla is the protagonist of Tesla vs Lovecraft and fights monsters summoned by Lovecraft.
- Tesla is an ally of the Assassin's order in the Assassin's Creed series.
- In Fate/Grand Order, Tesla appears in the London Singularity and briefly in E Pluribus Unum Singularity as an Archer-class Servant. His Noble Phantasm, System Keraunos, is a powerful electromagnetic attack that deals extra damage against servants with Earth or Sky Attribute.
- Zen Studios developed a virtual pinball table about Tesla's work and experiments, which became one of the first four tables in its first pinball game, Zen Pinball, released in 2009. It went on to appear in the game's subsequent ports and is available as add-on content for the game's sequels. Nikolai Tesla himself, portrayed by a voice actor, is the table's unseen announcer.
- Tesla appears in the 2019 adventure horror video game Close to the Sun, voice acted by Jannik Archer. Set in an alternate reality in 1897, he has created a company called Wardenclyffe, and has pulled ahead in a technology war against American inventor Thomas Edison.
- In the 2020 game Iron Harvest, the mechs, or automachines as they are called, are inventions of Tesla, which he had created to improve Human quality of life, but instead they were used by the various world powers in the Great War. Dismayed that his inventions were used for war, he shut himself, and his personal Factory, away from the nations of the world. Tesla, and his Factory, play a major role throughout the game's campaign story.

=== Allusions ===
- The 2014 adventure game Tesla Effect: A Tex Murphy Adventure deals with many of Tesla's inventions such as the Spirit Radio, Tesla's Egg, the Death Ray, and a recreation of the Wardenclyffe Tower. It also includes an organization called the "Tesla Legacy Society" dedicated to solving the problems of humanity through the works and inspiration of Tesla.

== Banknotes and coins ==
- Nikola Tesla is portrayed on some Croatian euro coins (10, 20 and 50 cents coins).
- Nikola Tesla is portrayed on the 100 Serbian dinar banknote.

== Theme Parks ==
- The 2024 roller coaster Voltron Nevera is inspired by the life and work of Nikola Tesla and features an animatronic of him during the queue line.

== See also ==
- Category:Cultural depictions of scientists
