= Held (novel) =

2023 novel by Anne Michaels

- Author: Anne Michaels
- Language: English
- Publisher: Knopf
- Publication date: 2023
- Publication place: Canada
- Pages: 240
- ISBN: 9780593536865

Held is a 2023 novel by writer and poet Anne Michaels, published by Knopf, a subsidiary of Penguin Random House. An epic novel, spanning a time period from 1908 to 2025, the work tells the story of multiple members of a family spanning four generations, and various other people who are connected to them in some way. The locations or settings are varied and include a French battlefield during World War I, 1900s Paris, mid-20th century Suffolk, 2025 in Finland, and London. Two of the settings are war zones.

The narrative is told unconventionally, shifting between past, present and future. Although the relationship between the different settings and characters is not always immediately apparent, several themes recur throughout the narratives. These include mortality and death, the philosophy of science, love, the soul, grief, and forms of image capture such as photography.

The novel was shortlisted for the 2024 Booker Prize, and won the 2024 Giller Prize.

== Reception ==
In a review in The Observer, novelist Alice Jolly noted that Held revisits the themes of Michaels' earlier works, Fugitive Pieces and The Winter Vault: "history, memory, the effects of trauma and grief over long periods, and the power of love to heal even the most grievous pain." She praised the way in which the book does so using "personal, hypersensitive and profoundly interior" writing which "continues to stand head and shoulders above most other fiction."

Views on the novel's structure were mixed. Writing for The Guardian, writer and historian Lucy Hughes-Hallett said that the non-chronological manner in which the narrative is told — moving back and forth between different eras, with interspersed memories, dream sequences and meditations of different characters — makes the work more profound. In contrast, in a negative review in the Times Literary Supplement, Andrew Motion said that the novel has less "imaginative energy" than Michaels' previous novels. He felt that the elliptical plot, lack of character development and lack of establishing the settings essentially makes the characters "ciphers for the author's obsessions."
