= Diego Matamoros =

Canadian actor

- Born: Rio de Janeiro, Brazil
- Occupation: Actor
- Years active: 1980–present

Diego Matamoros is a Canadian actor who has performed in theatre, television, film, radio, and voice animation, both across Canada and in the United States. In 1998, he voiced the character, William Birkin, in the video game, Resident Evil 2, and won a Gemini Award for his performance as Dr. Goldman in CBC Television's miniseries, The Sleep Room. Other film credits include: "Montreal Vu Par" directed by Denys Arcand (1990) and the film adaptation of Anne Michaels' award-winning novel, Fugitive Pieces, directed by Jeremy Podeswa (2007). In 1998 he co-founded the Soulpepper Theatre Company with 11 other actors and has, since then, appeared in every season with the company, with more than 70 roles over 22 seasons.

== Career ==
In 2006, he co-founded and taught Soulpepper's advanced actors' year-round training program: The Soulpepper Academy. He has taught and directed at the National Theatre School of Canada, Ryerson University, George Brown Theatre School, and the University of Toronto. He had also received the Dora Mavor Moore Award multiple times for his stage performances, which include The Fool in King Lear (2006), Clov in Samuel Beckett's Endgame (1999 and 2015), the title role in "Uncle Vanya" (2000, 2001 and 2008), George in "Who's Afraid of Virginia Woolf" (2014) and Roy Cohn in Angels in America (2013 and 2014). He also co-created and performed two original works for the company: an eponymous adaptation of The Aleph (2011) and "Cage" (2017), which was also performed as part of Soulpepper's summer residency at the Signature Theatre, 55th Street, in New York City. He is also known for voicing Cluny the Scourge and Badrang the Tyrant in Redwall.

== Filmography ==
Year	Title	Role	Notes
1987	The Big Town	Sid	
1991	Montreal Stories	Homme au verre de vin	(segment "Vue d'ailleurs")
1998	Resident Evil 2	William Birkin	video game
1998	The Sleep Room	Dr. Goldman	
1998	Bone Daddy	Baxter	
1999	Redwall	Cluny the Scourge (voice)	TV series
2001	Martin the Warrior: A Tale of Redwall	Badrang The Tyrant (voice)	TV series
2003	The Gospel of John	Nicodemus	
2007	Fugitive Pieces	Jozef	
