= Šerbedžija =

Šerbedžija is a surname. Notable people with the surname include:

- Danilo Šerbedžija (born 1971), Croatian film director
- Lucija Šerbedžija (born 1973), Croatian actress and model
- Rade Šerbedžija (born 1946), Serbian and Croatian actor, director and musician
