= Mark Twain in popular culture =

Cultural depictions of Mark Twain

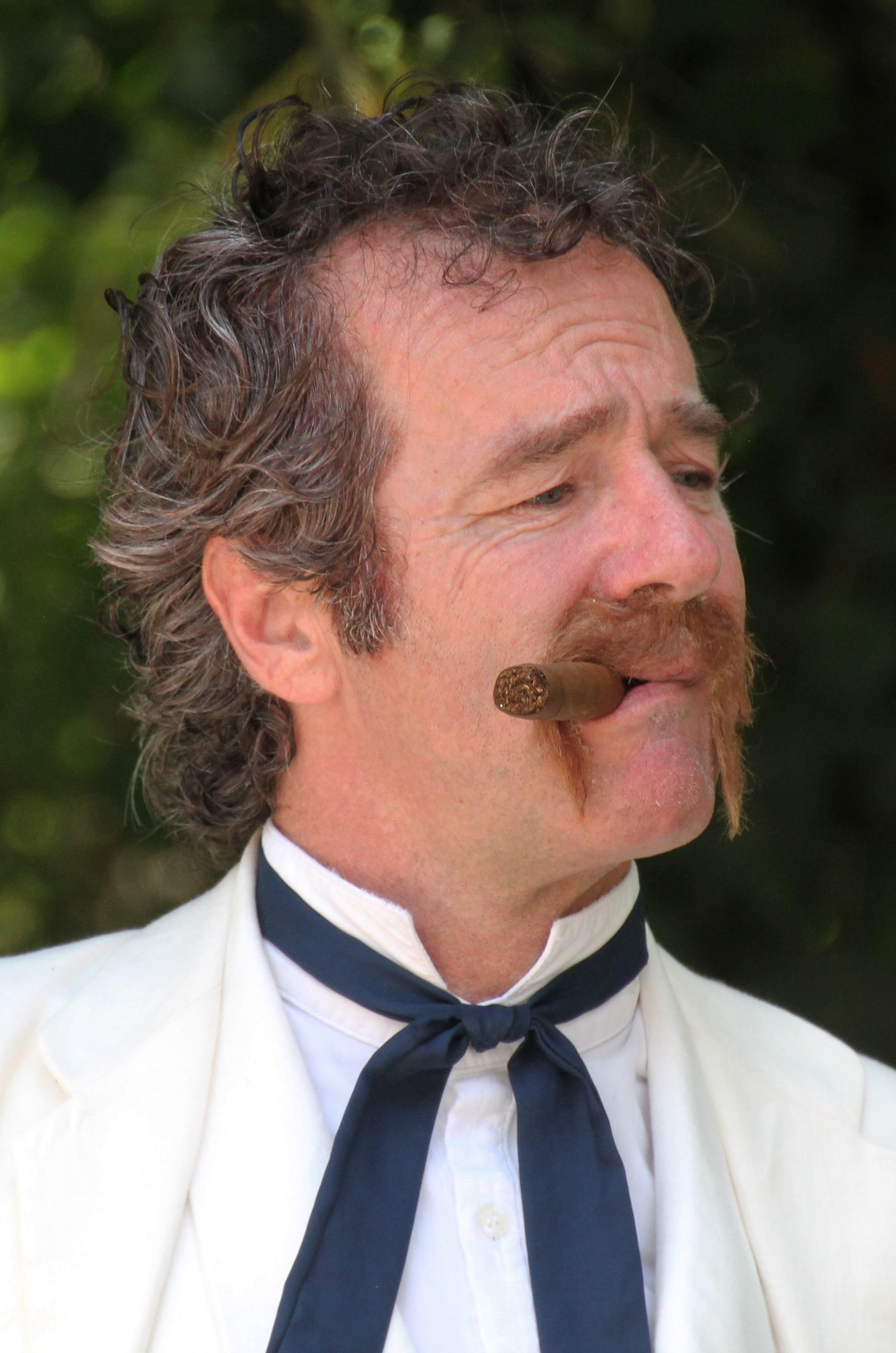
Actor Jeffrey Weissman portraying Mark Twain in 2015

Mark Twain's legacy includes awards, events, a variety of memorials and namesakes, and numerous works of art, entertainment, and media.

== Amusement parks and attractions ==
- An audio-animatronic of Mark Twain is the co-host of a show named "The American Adventure" at Epcot, Walt Disney World.
- Mark Twain Riverboat in Hannibal, Missouri; a local attraction.
- Mark Twain Riverboat, an attraction at the Disneyland theme parks in Anaheim, California (on which passengers embark on a scenic, 12-minute journey around the Rivers of America this one had her maiden voyage on July 13, 1955), Disneyland Paris, Tokyo Disneyland, and Walt Disney World.

== Arts and entertainment ==
=== Artwork ===
- Twain is among the historical figures depicted in Our Nation's 200th Birthday, The Telephone's 100th Birthday (1976) by Stanley Meltzoff for Bell System.

=== Comics ===
- In The Five Fists of Science (2006), Twain teams up with Nikola Tesla to defeat the evil plans of Thomas Edison.
- Twain appeared in a comic strip story featuring The Phantom. The story featured the 16th Phantom meeting Twain in the Wild West.
- In the 2009 webcomic Homestuck, Mark Twain is depicted as Colonel Sassacre.
- Clemens appears in "Three Septembers and a January", issue 31 of The Sandman. Set in September 1864, Clemens is a journalist in San Francisco who strikes up a friendship with Emperor Norton I. After Clemens tells Norton his story about a jumping frog, the Emperor encourages Clemens to publish it.

=== Film ===
- James Bush portrayed Twain in the 1937 film Battle of Greed.
- Fredric March portrayed Twain in the 1944 film The Adventures of Mark Twain.
- Forrest Taylor portrayed Twain in the 1945 film Rockin' in the Rockies.
- The Adventures of Mark Twain (1985), a Claymation fantasy film, focuses on Twain trying to "keep his appointment" with Halley's Comet, as he was born under Halley's Comet and said he would die upon its return, which he did. Twain was voiced by James Whitmore.
- Disney made a 1991 film titled Mark Twain and Me, based on his acquaintance with young girl Dorothy Quick, during the final years of his life. Twain inspired Dorothy to later become an author. Jason Robards played Twain.
- Dennis O'Connor voiced Twain in the 1998 IMAX documentary Mark Twain's America, directed by Stephen Low.
- Kevin Conway voiced Twain in the 2002 documentary Mark Twain, which was produced and directed by Ken Burns.
- Rapper Vanilla Ice played Twain in the Western comedy film The Ridiculous 6.
- Nathan Osgood portrayed Twain in the 2018 comedy film Holmes & Watson.

=== Literature ===
- Singer/songwriter Jimmy Buffett gives Twain a nod in his own literature, most notably by naming a main character's horse Mr. Twain.
- Sam Clemens is one of the ]] science fiction series by Philip José Farmer (1971–1983), depicting the posthumous career of various famous people resurrected at the banks of a mighty river in a mysterious world. In particular, the second book of the series, The Fabulous Riverboat, describes the quest of the character Clemens to build a paddle-boat to travel the vast river, with many echoes from the life of the real Clemens.
- Winston Churchill recounts being introduced by Mark Twain during his American lecture tour following the Boer War, and writes of making his friendship.
- William Saroyan wrote a short story entitled Samuel L. Clemens in his book, Letters from 74 rue Taitbout or Don't Go But If You Must Say Hello to Everybody (1971).
- Clemens is a major character in Peter Heck's series of historical mysteries in which Clemens hires a travel secretary before leaving on a lecture tour, which provides a variety of settings (such as New Orleans and London) through the course of six books. The secretary, Wentworth Cabot, is the series' narrator as well as a prime player/suspect in each adventure. With Cabot, or to clear him, Clemens gets involved and uses detective skills, his intelligence and his insight into human nature to solve each mystery. The title of each volume is a spin on a work by Twain: Death on the Mississippi (1996), an homage to Life on the Mississippi; A Connecticut Yankee in Criminal Court (1997) for A Connecticut Yankee in King Arthur’s Court; The Prince and the Prosecutor (1998) for The Prince and the Pauper; The Guilty Abroad (1999) for The Innocents Abroad; The Mysterious Strangler (2000) for The Mysterious Stranger; and Tom’s Lawyer (2001) for The Adventures of Tom Sawyer.
- Mark Twain appears in To Sail Beyond the Sunset (1987), part of Robert A. Heinlein's Lazarus Long cycle, as a family friend of the protagonist.
- Sesh Heri's novel Wonder of the Worlds (2005) depicts Twain joining Harry Houdini and Nikola Tesla on a journey to Mars in 1893.
- Mark Twain appears in Joe R. Lansdale's Flaming Zeppelins: The Adventures of Ned the Seal (2010), an omnibus of Lansdale's novels Zeppelins West and Flaming London.
- Samuel Clemens is a character in Kirk Mitchell's novel Never the Twain (1987), in which Howard Hart, the last living descendant of Western writer Bret Harte, a contemporary of Twain, travels back in time in an attempt to prevent Twain's literary career from taking off and overshadowing his ancestor's.
- Samuel Clemens is a main character in Dan Simmons's Fires of Eden (1994). The main protagonist, Eleanor, follows in her aunt's footsteps, recreating a journey Aunt Kidder took with Clemens to the volcanoes on the Big Island of the then-Sandwich Islands (now Hawaii). The book alternates between Eleanor's modern day experiences and the events described in the diary.
- Samuel Clemens appears in the alternate history novel How Few Remain (1997) as part of the Southern Victory series by Harry Turtledove, in which one of the side-effects of the Confederacy's winning the American Civil War (known as the War of Succession in the series) in 1862 is that Clemens remains in San Francisco and becomes a newspaper editor there rather than an author, and never takes up a literary career or the pen name Mark Twain. When the Union and Confederate States go to war again during the Second Mexican War from 1881-1882 with the United Kingdom and France siding with the Confederacy, he writes many a scathing editorial. In this history, he marries a different wife than in our history and has different children - one of whom, a daughter named Ophelia, appears in a sequel as a famous journalist herself.

=== Music ===
- Singer/songwriter Jimmy Buffett has written three songs based on Twain's travelogue, Following the Equator ("That's What Livin' is to Me", "Take Another Road", and "Remittance Man") and has paraphrased Twain in other songs.
- Twain is mentioned in Tom Petty's song "Down South" from his album Highway Companion (2006).

=== Online ===
Google

- On November 30, 2011, Google celebrated Mark Twain's 176th birthday with a Google Doodle. The Google logo depicted the famous whitewashing scene from The Adventures of Tom Sawyer.

Webcomics

- The webcomic series Achewood features Mark Twain as a character in one of the strip's story arcs. This arc features a narrative written in an imitation of Mark Twain's style, as Twain journals his encounter with two of the strip's central characters, who time-traveled from the modern day to the late 19th century.
- Colonel Sassacre, a character heavily inspired by Mark Twain, appears in Andrew Hussie's webcomic Homestuck.
- Another webcomic, Thinkin' Lincoln, features a zombified Mark Twain as a frequent character.

=== Postage stamps ===
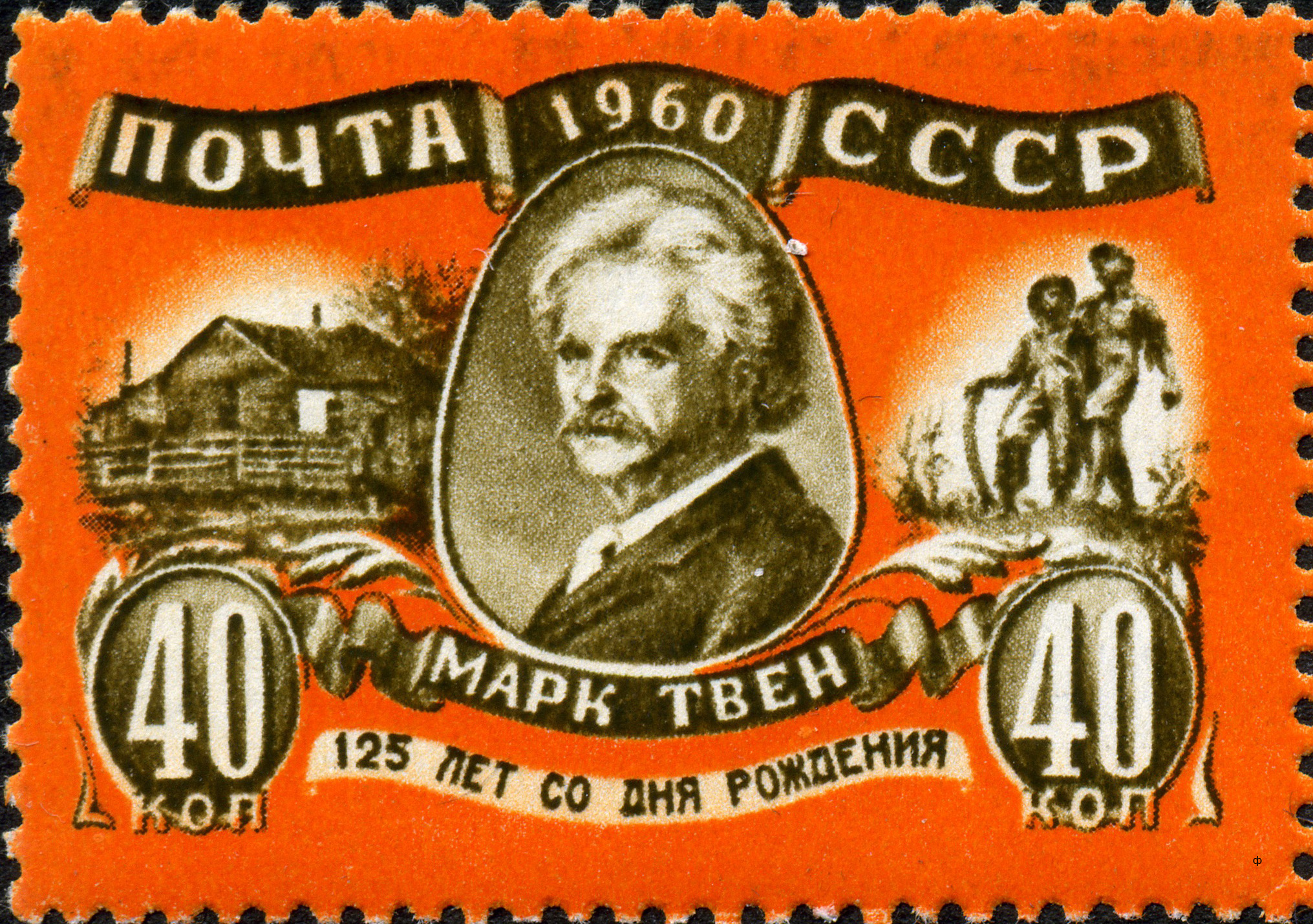
1960 stamp marking the 125th birthday of "Mark Tven"

- Twain appeared on a 1960 Soviet Union postage stamp.
- On December 4, 1985, the United States Postal Service issued a stamped envelope for "Mark Twain and Halley's Comet", noting the connection with Twain's birth, his death, and the comet.
- On June 25, 2011, the Postal Service released a Forever stamp in his honor.

=== Sculptures ===
- A statue of Mark Twain stands in his native town of Hannibal, Missouri, and was erected in 1913, three years after his death.
- A statue of Mark Twain, and another of his wife Olivia, stands at Elmira College. The college library also has a statue of Twain seated on a bench.
- A seated state of Twain on a bench was installed outside of the Finney County Library in Garden City, Kansas.
- A statue by Gary Lee Price of Twain reading "Adventures of Huckleberry Finn" while sitting on a bench sits at the entrance to the Doe Memorial Library at University of California, Berkeley, where a collection of Twain's papers and letters is held.

=== Stage productions ===
- Actor Hal Holbrook performed his one-man show Mark Twain Tonight! annually from 1959 to 2017, with each show presenting somewhat different Twain content.
- Meteorologist Mike Randall has performed his own one-man show, Mark Twain Live!, since the early 1970s.
- Ted Davis adapted some of Twain's early works for Twain's Folly, a 1982 stage production he also directed at The Lyric Stage Company of Boston.
- Actor Val Kilmer played Mark Twain in a traveling one-man show in 2017 that was turned into a film presentation called Cinema Twain.

=== Television ===
- Kevin McCarthy played Mark Twain on ABC's The Rifleman in the 1961 episode "The Shattered Idol".
- Biography first profiled Mark Twain in 1962. A full episode and other material are available on Biography.com.
- Royal Dano played Mark Twain in the 1975 television film Huckleberry Finn.
- Jack Warden played Mark Twain in the 1984 made-for-television biographical film Helen Keller: The Miracle Continues.
- Mark Twain/Samuel Clemens is played by Christopher Connelly in the 1977 made-for-television film The Incredible Rocky Mountain Race, in which Twain is pitted in a rivalry against legendary "King of the Keelboaters" Mike Fink in a cross-country scavenger hunt, although the real-life Fink died twelve years before Twain was born. Much of the story and its humor is culled from Twain's various works.
- Irish actor Dan O'Herlihy portrayed Mark Twain in the 1979 television drama Mark Twain: Beneath the Laughter.
- Three episodes of Bonanza are about Samuel Clemens publishing The Territorial Enterprise in Virginia City. They were "Enter Mark Twain", from October 10, 1959; "The Emperor Norton", from February 27, 1966, and "The Twenty-Sixth Grave", from October 31, 1972
- The Histeria! episode "Super Writers" featured a sketch about Samuel Clemens taking on the Mark Twain identity on suggestion from Chit Chatterson. Twain also appears in the same episode as a member of the Legion of Super Writers.
- Late Show with David Letterman occasionally features a segment titled "Mark Twain Tonight", in which a man dressed as Mark Twain does a short comedy solo while sitting on a rocking chair.
- The two-part Star Trek: The Next Generation episode "Time's Arrow" (1992), features a fictionalized version of Mark Twain, played by Jerry Hardin, in which the crew of the starship Enterprise pursues malevolent alien life forms through a time portal to 1893 San Francisco. There, the group's secretive actions arouse the suspicions of Samuel Clemens.
- John Cullum plays Twain in a Season 4 episode of Touched by an Angel, “It Came Upon a Midnight Clear.” The story was published as an illustrated novel on December 26, 1999.
- Cameron Daddo plays Samuel Clemens in the 2003 Riverworld feature-length pilot for the SciFi Channel. Mark Deklin plays Samuel Clemens in the 2010 reboot, a Riverworld miniseries. See Literature, above, for the Riverworld novels.
- An episode of The Super Mario Bros. Super Show!, titled "Rolling Down the River", had Mario and Luigi helping a caricature named Mark Twang win a riverboat race against Bowser.
- Clemens appears in the season 3 episode of The Venture Bros. titled "ORB" as an original member of The Guild alongside Col. Lloyd Venture, Fantomas, Aleister Crowley, Eugen Sandow, Nikola Tesla, Oscar Wilde and the Avon ladies.
- Craig Wasson portrayed Twain in The Innocents Abroad (1983), an adaptation of the author’s 1869 travel book featured on Great Performances.
- William Shatner portrayed Twain in "Marked Twain" (October 12, 2015), episode 2 of season 9, of the Canadian television period drama Murdoch Mysteries. In the story, Twain is nearly assassinated while giving a speech at the Empire Club of Canada.
- A character named after Twain appears in Bungo Stray Dogs (2012), first debuting in chapter 18. The character has an ability named after Twain's Tom Sawyer and Huckleberry Finn novels called "Huck Finn and Tom Sawyer". Hiroyuki Yoshino voices him in the anime adaptation.
- Christopher Stone guest starred as Sam Clemens in the Father Murphy season two episode "Stopover in a One Horse Town" as a visiting newspaper editor who befriends two boys from the Gold Hill orphanage and gathers story ideas from their antics.
- Mark Twain appears in the episode "Twain's World" on Family Guy. Brian and Stewie go back in time and bring Twain to the present to help Brian become a better writer. The episode aired on July 17, 2025.

=== Video Games ===
In Red Dead Redemption 2 there is a location named Clemens Point after the Author Mark Twain.

== Awards ==
Awards in his name proliferate:

- The Mark Twain Readers Award is an award given annually to a book for children in grades four through eight by the Missouri Association of School Librarians.
- The Mark Twain Masonic Awareness Award was named in his honor; Twain was a Freemason.
- In 1998, The John F. Kennedy Center for the Performing Arts created the Mark Twain Prize for American Humor, awarded annually.

== Events ==
- Stetson University in DeLand, Florida sponsors the Mark Twain Young Authors' Workshop each summer in collaboration with the Mark Twain Boyhood Home & Museum in Hannibal. The program is open to young authors in grades five through eight. The museum sponsors the Mark Twain Creative Teaching Award.
- The signature event of Calaveras County Fair and Frog Jumping Jubilee is the Frog Jump, a competition based on Twain’s work "The Celebrated Jumping Frog of Calaveras County".

== Places ==
=== In outer space ===
- Asteroid 2362 Mark Twain was named after him.

=== Geography ===
- The Mark Twain Bret Harte Historic Trail in Tuolumne County, California, is named after both writers. A plaque (Marker Number 431) was erected in 1948 by the California Centinal Commission.
- Mark Twain Cave in Hannibal, Missouri, the real-life cave that inspired Twain's tale of a lost Tom and Becky
- Mark Twain Historic District, Hannibal, Missouri, listed on the National Register of Historic Places in 1978.
- Mark Twain Lake is located in Mark Twain State Park, near the Mark Twain Birthplace State Historic Site
- Mark Twain State Park is a state park located in Monroe County, Missouri.
- Mark Twain Village is a United States Army installation located in the Südstadt district of Heidelberg, Germany. It is one of two American bases in the United States Army Garrison Heidelberg that house American soldiers and their families (the other being Patrick Henry Village).
- A street in Detroit, Michigan's located on Detroit's North Westside was named originally after Mark Twain.
- Twain Harte, California is a census-designated place in Tuolumne County, California, United States. Its name is derived from the last names of two famous authors who lived in California, Mark Twain and Bret Harte. See https://en.wikipedia.org/wiki/Twain_Harte,_California.

=== Plants ===
- The Mark Twain Tree was a giant sequoia tree located in the Giant Forest of Sequoia National Park that was felled in 1891 and put on display at the American Museum of Natural History in New York and the British Museum in London.

=== Schools ===
Several schools are named after him, including:

- Mark Twain Elementary School in Houston, Texas, which has a statue of Twain sitting on a bench.
- Mark Twain Elementary School in Wheeling, Illinois, and There is also Mark Twain Intermediate School in New York.
- There are several schools named Mark Twain Middle School in different states.
- Samuel Clemens High School in Schertz, near San Antonio, Texas.
- Mark Twain High School operated from 1921 to 1965 in Stotesbury, West Virginia. The school was named by the junior high school students who would be attending the school. Its sports teams were the Authors. U.S. Senator Robert C. Byrd was the valedictorian in 1934.

=== Structures ===
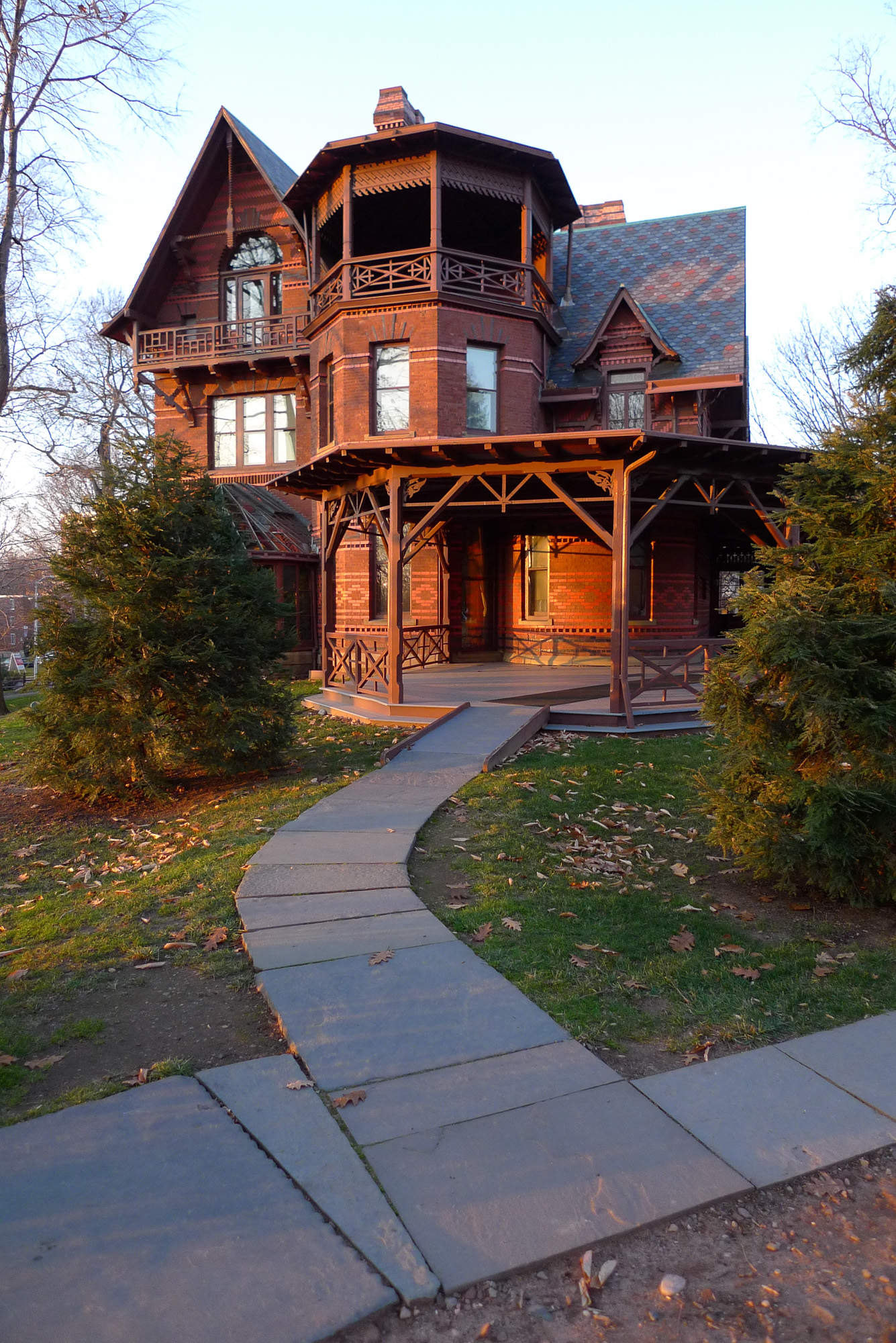
Twain House in Hartford, Connecticut

Many sites have been named after Twain. Many buildings associated with the writer, including some of his many homes, have been preserved as museums.

- Mark Twain Birthplace State Historic Site is preserved in Florida, Missouri.
- The Mark Twain Boyhood Home & Museum in Hannibal, Missouri preserves the setting for some of the author's best known work; it was designated a National Historic Landmark on December 29, 1962.
- Mark Twain Cabin on Mark Twain Bret Hart Trail (erected by Tuolumne County Chamber of Commerce in 1926), was a stopping place for packers carrying supplies to miners and the site where Twain wrote "The Celebrated Jumping Frog of Calaveras County", from notes made at Angels Camp Tavern.
- Mark Twain Family Cabin, believed to have belonged to Twain's father, John Marshall Clemens, and may have been where the author's older siblings were born and where Twain was conceived (the Clemens family moved to Missouri a few months before he was born). The cabin was originally located in the Possum Trot community in Fentress County, Tennessee, where John Clemens served as a postmaster and circuit court clerk. The cabin's chimney was added around 1905. The Museum of Appalachia purchased and moved the cabin to the museum in 1995.
- Mark Twain House and Museum, the family home Samuel Langhorne Clemens (a.k.a. Mark Twain) had built in Hartford, Connecticut and where he and his wife Olivia ("Livy") raised their three daughters from 1874 to 1891, is preserved and open to visitors. In 1962, it was declared a National Historic Landmark.
- Mark Twain Memorial Bridge, the name for two bridges over the Mississippi River at Hannibal, Missouri, Twain's childhood home.
- Mark Twain Memorial Lighthouse in Hannibal, Missouri; this only lighthouse built inland features a panoramic view of Hannibal and the Mississippi River.
- "Thatcher House", said to be the inspiration for his fictional character Becky Thatcher, is the home of Twain's childhood friend Laura Hawkins.
- In May 2007, a painstaking reconstruction of the home of Tom Blankenship, the inspiration for Huckleberry Finn, was opened to the public.
