= Fugitive Pieces (film) =

- theatrical release poster
- Directed by: Jeremy Podeswa
- Written by: Jeremy Podeswa
- Based on: Fugitive Pieces by Anne Michaels
- Produced by: Robert Lantos
- Starring: Stephen Dillane; Rade Šerbedžija; Rosamund Pike; Ayelet Zurer; Robbie Kay; Ed Stoppard; Rachelle Lefèvre
- Cinematography: Gregory Middleton
- Edited by: Wiebke von Carolsfeld
- Music by: Nikos Kypourgos
- Production companies: Cinegram; Serendipity Point Films; Strada Films
- Distributed by: Maximum Film Distribution (Canada)
- Release date: September 6, 2007 (TIFF)
- Running time: 104 minutes
- Countries: Canada; Greece
- Languages: English; Greek; Yiddish; German
- Budget: $CAD9.5 million

Fugitive Pieces is a 2007 Canadian drama film written and directed by Jeremy Podeswa, based on the 1996 novel by Anne Michaels. The film tells the story of Jakob Beer, who is orphaned in Poland during World War II and is saved by a Greek archeologist. The film premiered 6 September 2007 as the opening film of the 2007 Toronto International Film Festival.

== Cast ==
- Stephen Dillane as Jakob Beer
- Rade Šerbedžija as Athos Roussos
- Rosamund Pike as Alex
- Ayelet Zurer as Michaela
- Robbie Kay as Young Jakob
- Ed Stoppard as Ben
- Rachelle Lefèvre as Naomi
- Nina Dobrev as Bella
- Themis Bazaka as Mrs. Serenou
- Danae Skiadi as Allegra
- Diego Matamoros as Jozef
- Sarah Orenstein as Sara
- Larissa Laskin as Irena
- Daniel Kash as Maurice
- Devon Bostick as Teenage Ben
- Jennifer Podemski as Grace

== Production ==
Fugitive Pieces was in preproduction for seven years before filming started in various locations in Greece (Hydra, Kefalonia, and Lesvos) and various locations in Ontario, Canada (Hamilton and Toronto) in 2006 at a cost of $CAD9.5 million.

Matthew Davies was the production designer for the film. Peter Emmink was in charge of art direction. The costumes were designed by Anne Dixon. Set decoration was provided by Erica Milo and Nikos Triandafilopoulos. Visual effects were provided by Mr. X Inc. John Rowley was the music supervisor. Diane Pitblado was the dialect coach.

== Release ==
Fugitive Pieces premièred on 6 September 2007 as the opening film of that year's Toronto International Film Festival. It was later shown at the Vancouver International Film Festival, the Warsaw International Film Festival, the Rome Film Festival, the International Thessaloniki Film Festival in Greece (where it was shown under the title Syntrimmia psyhis), the Santa Barbara International Film Festival and the Newport Beach Film Festival.

It opened in limited release in the United States on 2 May 2008, grossed $102,212 in 30 theatres its opening weekend, and earned a total US gross of $634,379.

== Critical reception ==
As of 4 July 2022, the review aggregator website Rotten Tomatoes reported that 68% of critics gave the film a positive review, based on 76 reviews. The website's consensus reads, "Though the retelling is a bit too subtle, the moving story and solid performances lift Fugitive Pieces beyond standard holocaust tales." Metacritic reported the film had an average score of 60 out of 100, based on 19 reviews — indicating mixed or average reviews.

== Awards and nominations ==
| Year | Nominated/Won | Award/category | Festival/organization | Role |
|---|---|---|---|---|
| 2007 | Won | Best Actor | Rome Film Festival | Rade Šerbedžija as Athos |
| 2008 | Nominated | Best Supporting Actor in a Motion Picture | Satellite Award | Rade Šerbedžija as Athos |
| 2008 | Won | Best Film | Sydney Film Festival | — |
| 2008 | Won | Audience Award (Narrative Feature) | Sarasota Film Festival | — |
| 2008 | Won | Jury Award | Newport Beach Film Festival | — |

The film won the jury award of the Newport Beach Film Festival in the categories Best Cinematographer (Gregory Middleton), Best Director and Best Screenplay (Jeremy Podeswa) and Best Film.
