= Udovički =

Udovički is a surname. Notable people with the surname include:

- Kori Udovički (born 1961), Serbian politician
- Lenka Udovički (born 1967), Serbian theater director
