= Walter B. Gibson =

American writer and magician (1897–1985)

- Born: Walter Brown Gibson; September 12, 1897; Germantown, Philadelphia, Pennsylvania, U.S.
- Died: December 6, 1985 (aged 88); Kingston, New York, U.S.
- Occupations: Author and magician
- Writing career
- Pen name: Maxwell Grant (shared)
- Genres: comic books, comic strips, hypnotism, magic, psychic phenomena, pulp magazines, true crime, yoga

Walter Brown Gibson (September 12, 1897 – December 6, 1985) was an American writer and professional magician, best known for his work on the pulp fiction character The Shadow, and as a ghost-writer for many of his friend Harry Houdini's books. Gibson, under the pen-name Maxwell Grant, wrote 282 of the original 325 'The Shadow' novels/novellas during the 1930s/1940s, writing up to "10,000 words a day" to satisfy public demand during the character's golden age. He authored several novels in the Biff Brewster juvenile series of the 1960s. He was married to Litzka R. Gibson, also a writer, and the couple lived in New York state.

== Early life ==
Walter Brown Gibson was born on September 12, 1897, in the Germantown neighborhood of Philadelphia, Pennsylvania, to Alfred Cornelius Gibson (1849–1931) and May Morrell Whidden Gibson (1863–1941).

Gibson graduated from Colgate University in 1920 where he was a brother of Delta Kappa Epsilon, and began working "for newspapers in his native Philadelphia as a reporter and crossword-puzzle writer," specifically for The North American, and later The Evening Ledger. In 1923–1924, he provided illustrated single-page articles for Science and Invention magazine describing various tricks and puzzles. In 1927, he founded and edited the pulp magazine Tales of Magic and Mystery, which ran for five issues, ending in April 1928. In 1928 Gibson was asked by Macfadden Publications to edit True Strange Stories; he did, for a time, identified as Walter Scofield, commuting back and forth to New York. In 1931, after submitting some crime stories for Detective Story Magazine, he was asked by publishers Street & Smith to produce the first print adventure of The Shadow, who at that stage was merely a voice, the mysterious narrator of the Street & Smith-sponsored Detective Stories radio drama. It was Gibson who created all the mythos and characterization of The Shadow, including his alter ego of wealthy playboy Lamont Cranston.

== The Shadow ==
The popularity of the radio show's narrator inspired the show's sponsors (Street & Smith) to translate the character into print, and Gibson was duly asked to produce 75,000 words for the first quarterly issue of The Shadow pulp magazine. This first Shadow story was published on April 1, 1931, just nine months after the character's appearance on the airwaves. Six months after the first Shadow magazine, the Shadow was also headlining a new radio show, and his pulp adventures were so successful and popular they quickly went from a planned quarterly publication "a twice-monthly schedule," causing Gibson to produce the equivalent of 24 novels per year. Described as a "compulsive writer," Gibson is estimated to have written, at his peak output, 1,680,000 words a year and at least 283 of the 336 Shadow novels. Gibson ultimately contributed more than 15,000,000 words towards Shadow publications. All the Shadow stories were published under the house name of Maxwell Grant.

The Shadow character was spun off into a daily syndicated comic strip, monthly comic books, movies and parlor games. Gibson continued involvement with the character, scripting many of those comic book stories and the syndicated newspaper daily, as well as serving as a consultant on the Sunday night radio show.

Gibson is recognized as the creator of much of The Shadow's mythos, although his tales often conflict with the better-known radio show version. For example, Gibson's Shadow is, in reality, Kent Allard, a former World War I aviator, who sometimes posed as playboy Lamont Cranston due to their similar appearances. On the radio show, The Shadow was Cranston, a "wealthy young man about town." Similarly, Shadow companion Margo Lane arose not from the pulp novels but from the radio program; she was added to offer a contrasting female voice to the show's audience. In 1941 Gibson grudgingly added Margo Lane to the pulp stories, and even hinted at her having a power of invisibility.

== Magic, non-fiction, and other works ==
Gibson wrote more than a hundred books on magic, psychic phenomena, true crime, mysteries, rope knots, yoga, hypnotism, and games. He served as a ghost writer for books on magic and spiritualism by Harry Houdini, Howard Thurston, Harry Blackstone, Sr., and Joseph Dunninger. Gibson wrote the comic books and radio drama Blackstone, the Magic Detective. starring a fictionalized version of Harry Blackstone. Gibson introduced the "Chinese linking rings" trick in America, and invented the "Nickels to Dimes" trick that is still sold in magic stores to this day. He "wrote extensively on Houdini and his escape tricks and sleight of hand," and became involved after Houdini's death with Houdini seances. Houdini was known as much for his investigations into – and exposure of – false mediums, and after his death, his wife Bess held seances for ten years in an attempt to contact the deceased magician. She then passed this role on to Gibson, who for many years helped preside over the Houdini Seances in the 1970s and 1980s at New York's Magic Towne House with such well-known magicians as Milbourne Christopher, Dorothy Dietrich, Bobby Baxter, and Dick Brooks. Before Gibson died, he passed on the responsibility of doing the Houdini Seances to Dorothy Dietrich of the Houdini Museum in Scranton, Pennsylvania.

Under the pen name Andy Adams, Gibson is credited with writing at least five of the twelve novels in the Biff Brewster juvenile adventure and mystery series for adolescent boys: Brazilian Gold Mine Mystery, Mystery of the Mexican Treasure, Mystery of the Ambush in India, Egyptian Scarab Mystery, and Mystery of the Alpine Pass.

In the 1920s, Gibson wrote two books on numerology for the publisher George Sully & Co. With his wife Litzka R. Gibson (née Gonser), he co-wrote The Complete Illustrated Book of the Psychic Sciences (Doubleday, 1966), a 404-page book which explains how to practice many popular forms of divination and fortune-telling, including astrology, tasseography, graphology, and numerology. Litzka wrote her own books on topics as diverse as palmistry, dancing, and personal hygiene, sometimes under the pen-name Leona Lehman.

Gibson wrote a Batman prose story which appeared in Detective Comics #500 (March 1981) and was drawn by Thomas Yeates.

Gibson also ghosted the novelization of the Preston Sturges screenplay The Sin of Harold Diddlebock under the by-line of popular humorist Harry Hershfield. Hershfield had been commissioned to write the novel, but stalled out in the first chapter. Gibson was engaged to write it in his stead, and the adaptive prose is actually his, from start to finish.

== Appearances and tributes in fiction ==
He is a featured character in the Paul Malmont novel The Chinatown Death Cloud Peril, which was published by Simon & Schuster in 2006, and in the sequel The Astounding, the Amazing, and the Unknown (Simon & Schuster 2011). In addition, Gibson is the protagonist, along with actor Orson Welles, in a historical mystery by Max Allan Collins, The War of the Worlds Murder, published by Berkley Books in 2005.

In the Dynamite Entertainment miniseries The Shadow: Year One by Matt Wagner, a reporter appears on more than one occasion throughout the story's progress, investigating most of the appearances of The Shadow and its connection with Lamont Cranston (Allard, who had in fact changed his identity with Cranston's). At the end of the story we are shown that the reporter is called Maxwell Grant. Although it is not an appearance of Gibson as such, it is indeed a reference and tribute to his work in the novels when Grant talks of trying to document part of the adventures of The Shadow.

While not appearing directly, in P. N. Elrod's Bloodlist, Jack Fleming mentions that he knows the author of the Shadow Magazine, and when he comes across a mobster guard reading Terror Island thinks to himself that he will "have to write to Walter and tell him about his mobster fan."
