= Belladonna (2015 film) =

- Directed by: Dubravka Turić
- Produced by: Zdenka Gold
- Cinematography: Branko Linta
- Edited by: Dubravka Turić
- Release date: September 3, 2015 (Venice Film Festival)
- Running time: 18 minutes
- Country: Croatia
- Language: Croatian

Belladonna is a 2015 Croatian drama film written and directed by Dubravka Turić. It was awarded Best Short Film at the 72nd edition of the Venice Film Festival. It was also screened at the 2016 Sundance Film Festival.

== Plot ==
Three women of different ages and backgrounds meet in the waiting room of an ophthalmologist's office. As the two older women converse with one another, the younger Sasha learns of their experiences of tragedy, and although she develops a sense of closeness and connection with them, she loses the opportunity to share it with them before they go their separate ways.

== Cast ==
- Aleksandra Naumov as Sasha
- Nada Đurevska as Nada
- Lana Barić
- Drazen Kühn
- Anita Matkovic
