= Journalist (film) =

- Novinar
- Directed by: Fadil Hadžić
- Screenplay by: Fadil Hadžić
- Starring: Rade Šerbedžija; Fabijan Šovagović; Stevo Žigon
- Cinematography: Tomislav Pinter
- Edited by: Mira Škrabalo
- Music by: Alfi Kabiljo
- Production companies: Jadran Film; Croatia Film
- Release date: March 14, 1979 (Yugoslavia)
- Running time: 112 minutes
- Country: Yugoslavia

Journalist (Novinar) is a 1979 Croatian drama film directed and written by Fadil Hadžić and starring Rade Šerbedžija, Fabijan Šovagović and Stevo Žigon.

A politically provocative drama about an idealistic journalist who fights against censorship in the communist system, it is considered one of Hadžić's best and most popular films, as well as one of the most prominent Croatian films of the 1970s.

== Plot ==
Vlado Kovač (Rade Šerbedžija) is a journalist in a Zagreb daily newspaper. One morning, in a drunken outburst, he attacks a newsstand and throws the newspapers to the ground. This prompts a meeting of the journalists' communist organization where Kovač's case is discussed. In the meeting, it transpires that the root cause of his revolt is dissatisfaction with the journalistic freedom in the newspaper: Kovač's article about the workers' strike in the Mikros tools factory was stopped by Mirko, the editor (Tonko Lonza). In the meeting, Kovač is sharply confronted by Tomac (Stevo Žigon) and is defended by Nada (Vera Zima), Kovač's colleague.

Things take a turn for the worse for Kovač when Tomac becomes the new editor. He appreciates Kovač as a highly capable journalist and tries to win him over, but Kovač is adamant. Kovač's wife (Milena Zupančič) criticizes him for his self-centeredness and alcohol abuse, leaves him, and files for divorce. There is a turnaround in the Mikros strike when the Party decides to side with the workers, and Tomac now commissions Kovač to write an article similar to the one that was originally censored, which he refuses.

Kovač befriends Kos (Fabijan Šovagović), an old journalist. Over time, many similarities emerge between the two: Kos was also highly educated and dedicated to his profession, but grew embittered and dejected over time, sinking into alcoholism. When Kos dies from alcohol overdose, Kovač writes his obituary - only to find it heavily censored in the newspaper on the following day.

== Cast ==
- Rade Šerbedžija as Vlado Kovač
- Fabijan Šovagović as Kos
- Milena Zupančič as Irena, Kovač's wife
- Vera Zima as Nada
- Tonko Lonza as Mirko
- Stevo Žigon as Tomac
- Kruno Šarić as Šarić
- Mladen Budiščak as Franc
- Božidar Smiljanić as Milan
- Izet Hajdarhodžić as Ivo
- Slobodan Dimitrijević

== Themes ==
The warm relationship between young journalist Vlado Kovač (Rade Šerbedžija, left) and his older mentor Kos (Fabijan Šovagović) forms the emotional core of the film. The old mentor's tragic fate sends an implicit message about Kovač's future, and also serves as a metaphor about the future of the journalistic profession.

Journalist has been described as one of the most prominent examples of a subgenre which Croatian film historian Ivo Škrabalo has called the "feuilletonist cinema" (Croatian: feljtonistički film). It is a Yugoslav variety of the Western-made political cinema, characterized by topical analysis of Yugoslav society and its problems, such as social inequality, careerism and inter-ethnic tension. In this aspect, Journalist is a continuation of political themes seen in earlier Hadžić's films such as Protest and The Deer Hunt, as all three films center on a "revolutionary puritan engaged in a futile, obstinate, self-destructive battle against practical deviations of Yugoslav communism".

Although some Croatian film critics have described the film as exceptionally daring, Jurica Pavičić found such assessments somewhat overstated, particularly in comparison with films of the Yugoslav Black Wave. Nevertheless, he noted that Journalist was not only much more piercing than other feuilletonist films, but also much more pessimistic: there is no happy end, as the film ends with the message that the establishment always prevails - crushing its opposition in the process - and that the system cannot be fixed. In retrospect, Hadžić saw the film's central theme of journalistic integrity under attack of the powers-that-be still relevant in the early 21st century, a decade after the demise of the one-party system. In 1987, Hadžić named Journalist – with Protest and The Ambassador – among his best three films, and noted:

[T]hose three films are actually a single film about the betrayed ideals of the revolution. It is a kind of a crucifix for the socialist morality which had romantic revolutionary and theoretic assumptions, and a subsequent corrosion in practice.

Journalism is also not a unique topic in Hadžić's films - other examples include Official Position and Back of the Medal - but here it receives the most exhaustive treatment. Hadžić, a former journalist and editor-in-chief of Vjesnik u srijedu, a highly popular 1950s Zagreb-based weekly magazine, gave the film an authentic feel readily recognized by professional journalists. Reminiscing on the film in 2002, Hadžić stated:

All these things in Journalist, the protagonist clashing with the editor and with that gray, invisible line which embodies the official politics – I've been through all that.

== Reception ==
Journalist was popular and well received. Fadil Hadžić won the Golden Arena for Best Director at the 1979 Pula Film Festival. Despite the film's success, Hadžić had to wait for five years before he got the chance to shoot his next film, The Ambassador.

While some critics see Journalist as an undeservedly overlooked classic, others find that the film's expressiveness and narrative soundness lag behind Hadžić's best works. The critics' main complaint is the shallow characterization of the protagonist: his idealism and revolt seem completely unmotivated, even implausible, and his disagreeable, aloof disposition makes him difficult to sympathize with. Writing about the film in 2002, Croatian film critic Damir Radić characterized it as convincing in its treatment of the topic, but creatively less inspired.

== Sources ==
- Pavičić, Jurica (June 2003). "Igrani filmovi Fadila Hadžića" [Fadil Hadžić's feature films] (PDF). Hrvatski filmski ljetopis (in Croatian). 9 (34). Zagreb: Croatian Film Association, Croatian State Archives and Croatian Society of Film Critics: 3–38.
