= Mladen Budiščak =

Croatian actor

- Born: 8 September 1947; Zagreb, Yugoslavia
- Died: 16 June 2003 (aged 55); Zagreb, Croatia
- Occupation: Actor
- Years active: 1974-1991

Mladen Budiščak (8 September 1947 - 16 June 2003) was a Croatian actor. He appeared in more than ten films from 1974 to 1991.

== Selected filmography ==
Year	Title	Role	Notes
1991	Čaruga		
1981	The Melody Haunts My Memory	Vule	
1979	Journalist	Franc	
1978	Bravo maestro	Mladen	
1974	Whichever Way the Ball Bounces		
