= Tereza37 =

2020 film

- Film poster
- Directed by: Danilo Šerbedžija
- Written by: Lana Barić
- Produced by: Irena Marković
- Starring: Lana Barić
- Cinematography: Mirko Pivčević
- Edited by: Dubravka Turić
- Release date: 30 July 2020
- Running time: 100 minutes
- Country: Croatia
- Language: Croatian

Tereza37 is a 2020 Croatian drama film directed by Danilo Šerbedžija. It was selected as the Croatian entry for the Best International Feature Film at the 94th Academy Awards.

== Plot ==
After her fourth miscarriage during ten years of marriage, Tereza reevaluates her life and relationship.

== Cast ==
- Lana Barić as Tereza
- Ivana Roščić as Renata
- Leon Lučev as Marko
- Dragan Mićanović as Nikola
- Marija Škaričić as Mirela
- Goran Marković as Vedran
- Goran Bogdan as Aljoša

== See also ==
- List of submissions to the 94th Academy Awards for Best International Feature Film
- List of Croatian submissions for the Academy Award for Best International Feature Film
