= Rade Šerbedžija =

Croatian actor, director, and musician

- Раде Шербеџија
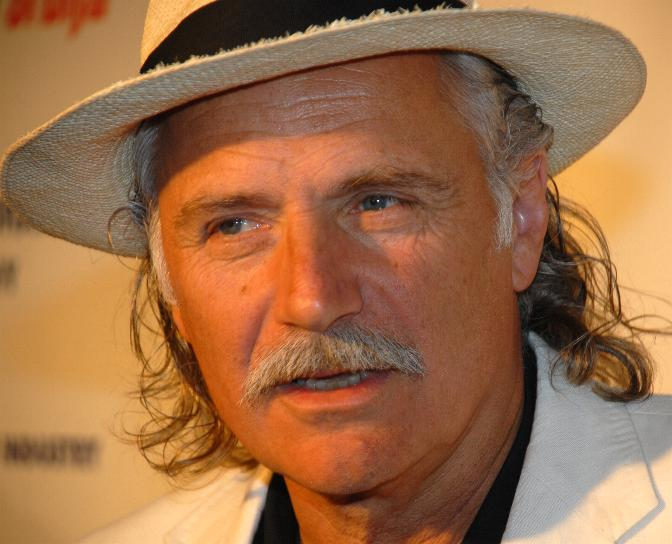
- Šerbedžija at the 12th Satellite Awards in December 2007
- Born: 27 July 1946 (age 80); Bunić, PR Croatia, Yugoslavia (now Croatia)
- Other name: Rade Sherbedgia
- Citizenship: Croatia; North Macedonia; Slovenia
- Occupation: Actor
- Years active: 1967–present
- Spouses: Ivanka Cerovac (m. 1969; div. 1987) Lenka Udovički (m. 1991)
- Children: 5, including Danilo and Lucija

Rade Šerbedžija (Note: Serbian Cyrillic: Раде Шербеџија, pronounced [rǎːde ʃerbědʒija]) (born 27 July 1946) is a Croatian and Yugoslav actor, director and musician. He started in theatre, and became one of the best known Yugoslav actors in the 1970s and 1980s, for his stage and film portrayals of imposing figures on both sides of the law. Of Serbian descent, during the breakup of Yugoslavia he moved abroad, where he became internationally known for his role as Boris the Blade in Snatch (2000) and his supporting roles in such Hollywood films as The Saint (1997), Eyes Wide Shut (1999), Mission: Impossible 2 (2000), Batman Begins (2005) and Harry Potter and the Deathly Hallows: Part 1 (2010). He also had a recurring role in season 6 of TV action series 24.

Šerbedžija is a four-time recipient of the Golden Arena for Best Actor, Croatia's highest filmmaking honors. He won the Critics Award for Best Actor at the 51st Venice International Film Festival for his performance in Before the Rain (1994). He also received the International Press Academy’s Mary Pickford Award, an honorary recognition “for Outstanding Artistic Contribution to the Entertainment Industry” in 2019.

== Early life ==
Rade Šerbedžija was born on 27 July 1946 in the village of Bunić in the Lika region of Croatia, then part of Yugoslavia. His parents were ethnic Serbs who fought in the Second World War as Partisans. Šerbedžija was raised as an atheist.

== Career in Yugoslavia ==
In 1969, he graduated from the Academy of Dramatic Arts of the University of Zagreb, and then worked as a theatre actor in the City Drama Theatre Gavella and at the Croatian National Theatre in Zagreb. While still a student, Šerbedžija started to play leading roles in films and theatre productions. His stage roles included Oedipus and Richard III. His performance as Hamlet in 1974 in Dubrovnik catapulted him into stardom.

Šerbedžija landed his first major film role in 1968 in the Branko Ivanda-directed Gravitation. He had various notable roles in Yugoslav films, among others in Bravo maestro (1978), Journalist (1979), Banović Strahinja (1981), Kiklop (1982) and San o ruži (1986). He was also among the leading actors in several TV series, such as in Prosjaci i sinovi (1971), U registraturi (1976), and Putovanje u Vučjak (1986).

Šerbedžija taught as a professor at the University of Zagreb from 1979 to 1981 and at the University of Novi Sad from 1987 to 1991.

Šerbedžija was one of the most well-known actors in Yugoslavia, in addition to being one of the most beloved. Prior to leaving his home country, Šerbedžija had starred in over 40 films. He was also one of the main supporters of the KPGT Yugoslav theater, a project initiated to unite the different Yugoslav state theaters into a single troupe.

Šerbedžija is a four-time recipient of the Golden Arena for Best Actor at the Pula Film Festival; in 1978 for Bravo maestro, in 1986 for Evening Bells (Večernja zvona), in 2010 for 72 Days (Sedamdeset i dva dana), and Fishing and Fishermen's Conversations (2020).

In 2000, Šerbedžija founded the Ulysses Theater with Borislav Vujčić on the Brijuni islands. In a co-production between the Ulysses Theatre and the National Theatre in Belgrade, for his role in the 2019 adaptation of Who's Afraid of Virginia Woolf?, Šerbedžija received the Zoran Radmilović Award, the Croatian Theatre Award for Best Actor in a Leading Role, and the Orlando Award. The same year, he won his second Vladimir Nazor Award for “Lifetime Achievement - Film Art”.

== International career ==
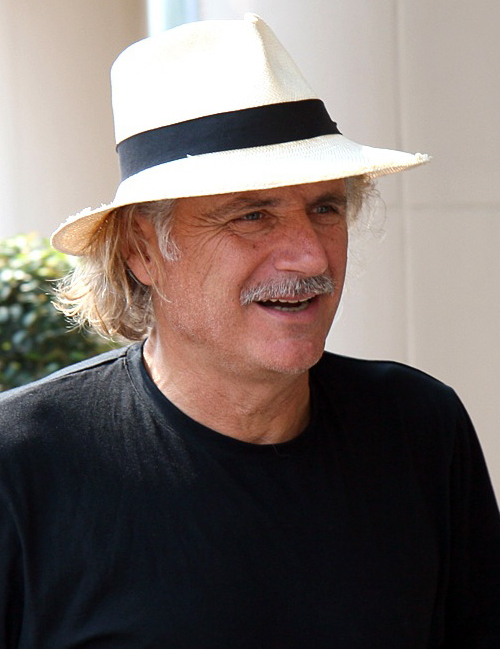
Šerbedžija at the 2007 Toronto International Film Festival.

In 1988, Šerbedžija appeared in two films that were released in the West; Hanna's War and Manifesto.

As war broke out in Yugoslavia, Šerbedžija initially moved to Serbia in 1992, then Slovenia before eventually spending some time in London, England at the invitation of actor and friend Anthony Andrews. While in London, Šerbedžija met with Macedonian-American director Milcho Manchevski who cast him in his 1994 film Before the Rain. The performance earned him a Critics Award for Best Actor at the Venice Film Festival.

Šerbedžija has had supporting roles in Hollywood films such as Mission: Impossible 2, Mighty Joe Young, The Saint, Eyes Wide Shut, Snatch, and Space Cowboys among others. He is usually known for playing villains.

He had a cameo in Batman Begins; he was asked to reprise his cameo role in The Dark Knight, but declined.

In 2001, he starred in a television production of Rodgers and Hammerstein's musical South Pacific as French plantation owner Emile de Becque. He also appeared in the BBC spy-thriller show Spooks for one episode as a villain. In 2005 he played Captain Blake in Rupert Wainwright's remake of The Fog, and had a supporting role in the NBC science fiction series Surface. In 2007 he played Athos Roussos in Jeremy Podeswa's feature film adaptation of Anne Michaels' novel Fugitive Pieces.

His performance in the Canadian film Fugitive Pieces (2007) was nominated for a Genie Award and Satellite Award for Best Supporting Actor.

He portrayed Dmitri Gredenko, a former Russian Army General, on the sixth season of the hit Fox show 24, first aired in 2007.

He had a role in Shooter (2007).

In 2009 Šerbedžija was cast in Harry Potter and the Deathly Hallows – Part 1 as the famous foreign wandmaker Gregorovitch. In 2014, Šerbedžija appeared in six episodes of Downton Abbey as Prince Kuragin, a Russian exile and long-ago lover of the Dowager Countess Violet Crawley, portrayed by Dame Maggie Smith.

He had a role in X-Men: First Class released in 2011, and in the 2012 film Taken 2.

In 2019, Šerbedžija was awarded the International Press Academy’s Mary Pickford Award, an honorary award “for Outstanding Artistic Contribution to the Entertainment Industry”.

== Other work ==
Šerbedžija is also known for his poetry readings and music. He has released four poetry books and four music albums. He recorded the award-winning ballad "Ni u tvome srcu" with Bosnian vocalist Kemal Monteno. While in London, Šerbedžija stayed at actress Vanessa Redgrave's residence and the two became friends. With Redgrave, Šerbedžija founded the Moving Theatre Company.

In 2017, Šerbedžija signed the Declaration on the Common Language of the Croats, Serbs, Bosniaks and Montenegrins.

== Personal life ==
Šerbedžija married Ivanka Cerovac in 1969. They have a son, film director Danilo (b. 1971), and a daughter, actress Lucija (b. 1973). The couple divorced in 1987.

Šerbedžija met his second wife, Lenka Udovički, the sister of Serbian politician Kori Udovički, in Subotica in 1990 and they married in 1991. With his second wife, he has three daughters: Nina, Vanja, and Mimi. The girls grew up in London during their early years, then moved to California due to their father's acting career.

Šerbedžija's parents left Vinkovci as Serb refugees for Belgrade in 1991, due to the Croatian War of Independence.

In 1992, while at a club in Belgrade, an intoxicated youth swore at Šerbedžija, calling him "Serb traitor", then shot his gun in the air. The youth himself was from Lika, as was Šerbedžija. Šerbedžija took his wife and at the time, only daughter Nina, and left Zagreb and Belgrade, and settled in Ljubljana, Slovenia. Šerbedžija has called himself "Yugo-nostalgic", and in 2011, said that times were better in Socialist Yugoslavia than now. Šerbedžija owns property in London, Hollywood, California, Rijeka, and Zagreb. As of January 2011, he reportedly spends most of his time in Rijeka together with his wife Lenka.

Šerbedžija is a citizen of Croatia, North Macedonia, and Slovenia.

== Filmography ==
=== Film ===
Year	Title	Role	Notes
1967	Iluzija	Mladic koji ubija Branka	
1967	Black Birds		
1968	Osveta		Short film
1968	Seansa		
1968	Gravitation	Boris Horvat	
1969	Dio è con noi		
1969	Sedmina - Pozdravi Marijo	Niko	
1970	Papagaj	Mladić	
1970	Passing Days		
1970	Red Wheat	Južek Hedl	
1970	Kainov znak	Milan	
1971	Putovanje na mjesto nesreće	Vlatko	
1971	Beggars and the sons	Matan Špalatrin	
1971	The Pine Tree in the Mountain	Domobran kicoš	
1972	Poslijepodne jednog fazana	Obijesni mladić	
1972	Rođendan male Mire		
1972	Zvezde su oči ratnika	Učitelj Rade	
1973	Pelikani		
1973	Živjeti od ljubavi	Davor	
1973	Begunec	Ivan	
1974	In the registrature	Ivica Kičmanović	
1974	A Performance of Hamlet in the Village of Mrduša Donja	Joco / Hamlet	
1974	Tojota Korola 1000		
1974	Obešenjak		
1974	Nocturno	Lucio	
1974	The Republic of Užice	Četnički oficir Kosta Barac	
1977	Noćna skela		
1977	Hajka	Lado	
1978	Bombaški proces	Josip Broz Tito	
1978	Bravo maestro	Vitomir Bezjak	
1979	Journalist	Vlado Kovač	
1979	Živi bili pa vidjeli		
1979	The Return	Komandir milicije	
1979	Usijanje	Tomo	
1980	The Woman from Sarajevo	Vlado Ratko	
1981	Tuga		
1981	Duvanski put	Tomo	
1981	Banović Strahinja	Abdulah	
1982	Variola Vera	Doktor Grujić	
1982	Cyclops	Ugo	
1982	13. jul	Kapetan Mitrović	
1982	Tamburaši		
1982	Život i priča		
1983	Zadah tela	Pančo Vila	
1983	Kvit posao	Jozo	
1983	Noć poslije smrti	Lucio Klarić	
1984	In the Jaws of Life	Intelektualac	
1984	Pejzaži u magli	Lelin otac	
1984	Una	Professor Mišel Babić	
1985	Life Is Beautiful	Harmonikaš	
1985	Horvatov izbor	Krešimir Horvat	
1986	San o ruži	Valent	
1986	Večernja zvona	Tomislav K. Burbonski	
1987	Die Verliebten	Dušan	
1987	Hudodelci	Raka	
1988	Zagrljaj		
1988	Tartif		
1988	Manifesto	Emile	
1988	Hanna's War	Captain Ivan	
1989	Čovjek koji je volio sprovode	Hinko	
1989	Seobe II	De Ronkali	
1990	Karneval, anđeo i prah		
1990	Majstori mraka		
1992	Dezerter	Pavle Trušić	
1993	Kontesa Dora	Karlo Armano	
1994	Magareće godine	Narrator	
1994	Before the Rain	Aleksandar	
1995	Urnebesna tragedija	Kosta	
1995	Two Deaths	Colonel George Lapadus	
1995	Belma	Josip Papac	
1996	Memento	The Officer	
1996	Broken English	Ivan	
1997	Nečista krv	Gazda Marko	
1997	Balkan Island: The Last Story of the Century	Rusty	
1997	The Saint	Ivan Tretiak	
1997	The Truce	Mardenou the Greek	
1998	Mighty Joe Young	Andrei Strasser	
1998	Polish Wedding	Roman	
1998	Prague Duet	Jiri Kolmar	
1999	Eyes Wide Shut	Mr. Milich	
1999	The Sweet Sounds of Life	Bruno Maier	
1999	Stigmata	Father Marion Petrocelli	
2000	Space Cowboys	General Vostow	
2000	Mission: Impossible 2	Dr. Nekhorvich	
2000	Snatch	Boris 'The Blade' Yurinov	
2000	Je li jasno prijatelju?	Milan Rajić	
2002	The Quiet American	Inspector Vigot	
2003	Quicksand	Oleg Butraskaya	
2003	The Cruelest Day	Miran Hrovatin	
2004	EuroTrip	Tibor	
2004	Golemata voda	Old Lem	
2004	Rade Šerbedžija Live in Budva	Himself	
2004	The Fever	Diplomat	
2005	The Keeper: The Legend of Omar Khayyam	Imam Muaffak	
2005	Batman Begins	Homeless Man	
2005	The Fog	Captain William Blake	
2005	Short Order	Paulo	
2005	Go West	Ljubo	
2006	Moscow Zero	Sergei	
2006	The Elder Son	Maxim Sarafanov	
2007	Balkanski sindrom	Old Alen	
2007	Hermano	Carlos Avileda	
2007	Tesla	Narrator	
2007	Shooter	Mikhayo Sczerbiak / Michael Sandor	
2007	Fugitive Pieces	Athos Roussos	
2007	Battle in Seattle	Dr. Marić	
2007	Say It in Russian	Raf Larin	
2007	Pravo čudo	Toma	
2007	L... Kot ljubezen	Big Daddy	
2007	Love Life	Arie	
2008	Quarantine	Yuri Ivanov	
2008	The Eye	Simon McCullough	
2009	Middle Men	Nikita Sokoloff	
2009	Thick as Thieves	Nicky Petrovich/Victor Korolenko	
2010	Lonesdale		
2010	Kao Rani Mraz	Stari Vasa Ladački	
2010	72 Days	Mane Paripović	
2010	Harry Potter and the Deathly Hallows – Part 1	Gregorovitch	
2011	5 Days of War	Col. Demidov	
2011	Tatanka	Vinko	
2011	X-Men: First Class	Russian General	
2011	Shun Li and the Poet	Bepi	
2011	In the Land of Blood and Honey	Gen. Nebojsa Vukojevich	
2012	The Fourth State	Onjegin	
2012	Taken 2	Murad Krasniqi	
2012	The Third Half	Don Rafael Cohen	
2012	Ustanicka ulica	Vraneš	
2013	Cry of the Butterfly	Ray	
2013	The Double	Frightening Old Man	
2014	The Legend of Hercules	Chiron	
2014	Tekken 2: Kazuya's Revenge	The Minister	
2015	Tesla: Iznad maste	Milutin Tesla	
2015	Sparrows	Tomislav	
2016	The Porcupine	Stoyo Petkanov	
2016	Tesla	Professor Petrov	
2016	The Promise	Stephan	
2016	The Liberation of Skopje	Gjorgjija	Also director and writer
2017	Anka	Biljeznik	
2017	Hedgehog's Home	Narrator	Short film; Serbo-Croatian version
2017	The Executrix	Arthur	
2017	The Last Prosecco	Desiderio Ancillotto	
2018	Proud Mary	Luka	
2018	Murderous Trance	Dr. Dabrowski	
2018	What's This Country Called Now?	Ismet Tabakovic	Short film
2019	Caviar	Pappy	
2020	Fishing and Fishermen's Conversations	Petar Hektorović	
2024	Air Force One Down	Rodinov	
2025	The Pavilion	Anjelo	It will open 31st Sarajevo Film Festival

=== Television ===
Year	Title	Role	Notes
1966	Prikupljanje hrabosti	Skalper	TV film
1966	Sedam sati i petnaest minuta	Tomica	TV film
1968	Maratonci		TV series; 1 episode
1969	Meteor		TV film
1969	Čamac za kron-princa		TV film
1970	Sam čovjek		TV miniseries; 3 episodes
1971	Prosjaci i sinovi	Matan Špalatrin	TV series
1974	Obraz uz obraz	Himself	TV series; 1 episode
1974	U registraturi	Ivica Kicmanović	TV series; 7 episodes
1975	Pesma	Mića Ranović	TV series; 6 episodes
1976	The Republic of Užice	Četnički oficir Kosta Barac	TV series; 1 episode
1977	Nikola Tesla	Nikola Tesla	TV series; 9 episodes
1979	Ivan Goran Kovačić	Ivan Goran Kovačić	TV film
1980	Sedam plus sedam	Himself	TV series; 1 episode
1982	Nepokoreni grad		TV series; 1 episode
1983	Kiklop	Ugo	TV series; 4 episodes
1986	Putovanje u Vučjak	Krešimir Horvat	TV series; 14 episodes
2001	South Pacific	Emile De Becque	TV film
2003	Spooks	Viktor Schvitkoy	TV series; 1 episode
2005	Surface	Dr. Aleksander Cirko	TV series; 6 episodes
2007	24	Dmitri Gredenko	TV series; 8 episodes
2007	Fallen	Dr. Lukas Grasic	TV miniseries
2008	My Own Worst Enemy	Yuri Volkalov	TV series; 2 episodes
2009	CSI: Miami	Alexander Sharova	TV series; 2 episodes
2014	Downton Abbey	Prince Kuragin	TV series; 6 episodes
2016	The Five	Jâkob Marosi	TV miniseries; 6 episodes
2017	Mata Hari	Emil Guimet	TV series; 2 episodes
2017	The Blacklist	Dr. Bogdan Krilov	TV series; 2 episodes
2017	Better Things	Arnold Hall	TV series; 1 episode
2018–2019	Strange Angel	Professor Filip Mesulam	TV series; 12 episodes
2020	Strike Back	Kalmedi	TV series; 1 episode
2022	Slow Horses	Nikolai Katinsky	TV series
2022	The Old Man	Old Suleyman Pavlovic	TV series

== Awards and nominations ==
Year	Group	Award	Result	Notes
1979	Pula Film Festival	Best Actor	Won	Bravo maestro
1986	Pula Film Festival	Best Actor	Won	Evening Bells
1994	Venice Film Festival	Best actor	Won	Before the Rain
1996	New Zealand Film and TV Awards	Best Foreign Performer	Won	Broken English
2006	Monaco International Film Festival	Best Actor	Won	Short Order
2007	Rome Film Fest	Best actor	Won	Fugitive Pieces
2008	Satellite Awards	Best Actor in a Supporting Role	Nominated	Fugitive Pieces
2008	Vancouver Film Critics Circle	Best Supporting Actor in a Canadian Film	Nominated	Fugitive Pieces
2009	Genie Awards	Best Performance by an Actor in a Supporting Role	Nominated	Fugitive Pieces
2012	Tetouan International Mediterranean Film Festival	Best Actor	Won	Io sono Li
