= The Liberation of Skopje (2016 film) =

2016 film

- Film poster
- Directed by: Rade Šerbedžija; Danilo Šerbedžija
- Written by: Rade Šerbedžija; Danilo Sherbedzija
- Produced by: Vladimir Anastasov; Robert Naskov; Igor Nola; Goran Tozija
- Starring: Deniz Abdula
- Cinematography: Dejan Dimeski
- Edited by: Nicolas Gaster
- Music by: Vlatko Stefanovski
- Production companies: Kino Oko; Art Films Production; Film and Music Entertainment; Lijeni Film; MP Film Production; Partysans Film
- Distributed by: VL-Media
- Release dates: 13 July 2016 (Pula FF); 12 September 2016 (Macedonia)
- Running time: 110 minutes
- Countries: Macedonia; Croatia; Finland
- Languages: Macedonian; German; Bulgarian

The Liberation of Skopje (Macedonian: Ослободување на Скопје, Osloboduvanje na Skopje) is a 2016 Macedonian drama film directed by Rade Šerbedžija and Danilo Šerbedžija. The film was selected as the Macedonian entry for the Best Foreign Language Film at the 89th Academy Awards but ended up not being nominated.

In September 2016, the Macedonian Society of Film Workers nominated the film for an Oscar in the category of Best Foreign Language Film.

== Cast ==
- Rade Šerbedžija as Gjorgjija
- Lucija Šerbedžija as Lica
- Silvija Stojanovska as Lenche
- David Todosovski as Zoran
- Mikko Nousiainen as Hans
- Nebojša Glogovac as Dushan
- Deniz Abdula as Bale
- Kire Acevski as Bugarski Branik
- Stefan Arsic as Orhan
- Hristina Dimovska as Anica
- Eleonora Gievska as Biba
- Antti Luusuaniemi as Polkovnik Herzog

== See also ==
- List of submissions to the 89th Academy Awards for Best Foreign Language Film
- List of Macedonian submissions for the Academy Award for Best Foreign Language Film
- Capture of Skopje (1944)
