= The Five Fists of Science =

- Date: May 2006
- Main characters: Mark Twain; Nikola Tesla; Baroness Bertha von Suttner; John Pierpont Morgan; Thomas Edison; Guglielmo Marconi; Andrew Carnegie; Elihu Root
- Publisher: Image Comics

Creative team
- Writers: Matt Fraction
- Artists: Steven Sanders
- ISBN: 1-58240-605-7

The Five Fists of Science is a steampunk graphic novel created by writer Matt Fraction and artist Steven Sanders. It was published in 2006 by Image Comics.

== Plot ==
Nikola Tesla, Mark Twain and Bertha von Suttner combine forces to try to bring about world peace through superior firepower. The comic's introduction shows Twain explaining that the story does not concern itself very much with historical accuracy, and this assertion is borne out by the story: Twain and Tesla use scientific know-how, general trickery and media manipulation techniques to try to scare world leaders into following their noble path.

In the company of several allies, the two are soon confronted by dark forces led by the dastardly Thomas Edison, John Pierpont Morgan, Andrew Carnegie, and Guglielmo Marconi. The inventors and financiers are collaborating on a bizarre new skyscraper, the Innsmouth Tower, on whose building site many construction workers have already died in mysterious accidents.

== Awards ==
- 2007: Nominated for "Favourite Original Graphic Novel" Eagle Award

== See also ==
- War of the currents
- Providence Biltmore, a tower with similar urban legend claims
- List of steampunk works
- Mark Twain in popular culture
- Nikola Tesla in popular culture
- Thomas Edison in popular culture
- Cthulhu Mythos in popular culture
- The League of Extraordinary Gentlemen
- Necronauts
- Fort: Prophet of the Unexplained
