= The Winter Vault =

Novel by Anne Michaels

- First edition (publ. McClelland & Stewart)
- Author: Anne Michaels
- Language: English
- Publisher: McClelland & Stewart
- Publication date: 2009
- Publication place: Canada
- ISBN: 9780771058905
- OCLC: 316662678
- Dewey Decimal: 813/.54
- LC Class: PR9199.3.M453 W56 2009b

The Winter Vault is Canadian writer Anne Michaels' second novel.

== Background ==
Michaels had started writing The Winter Vault before her breakout debut novel, 1997's Fugitive Pieces. The novel deals with topics of disenfranchisement and loss, and like Fugitive Pieces, it is written in a poetic, lyric style.

== Plot ==
The Winter Vault is the story of Avery and Jean, who are living in Egypt in 1964 when the great temple at Abu Simbel must be rescued from the rising waters behind the Aswan Dam. Avery is overseeing how the temple is taken apart and rebuilt again.

== Reception ==
The Winter Vault was praised by critics at outlets including The New York Times, The Guardian, and The Globe and Mail.
