= Wonder of the Worlds =

2005 novel by Sesh Heri

- Author: Sesh Heri
- Cover artist: Bob Aul & W Bosley
- Language: English
- Genre: Science fiction
- Published: Highland, CA: Lost Continent Library, 2005
- Media type: Book
- Pages: 361
- ISBN: 0-9727472-8-1
- OCLC: 63109406
- Followed by: Metamorphosis

Wonder of the Worlds is a novel by Sesh Heri, published 2005 by Lost Continent Library, is the first in a trilogy of novels featuring a fictionalized version of Harry Houdini facing off against a Martian invasion in the late 19th and early 20th centuries.

== Plot introduction ==
In the first installment, Wonder of the Worlds, Nikola Tesla, Mark Twain and Houdini pursue Martian agents who have stolen a powerful crystal from Tesla at the historically pivotal 1893 World's Columbian Exposition in Chicago. Along for the ride aboard Tesla's airship are other historical figures, reporters Lillie West and George Ade, as well as Kolman Czito, Tesla's assistant.

On the journey to the Red Planet, the adventurers are treated to a hidden history of conflict between the Earth and Mars, as well as Tesla's stunning knowledge of geophysics of the two planets. Upon arrival on Mars, the team pursues the crystal deep into the underground civilization ruled by Kel, the mad emperor determined to subjugate Earth with the power of the crystal.

== Houdini the Spy? ==
Almost a year after publication of Wonder of the Worlds, the 2006 release of The Secret Life of Houdini: The Making of America's First Superhero by William Kalush and Larry Sloman, presents biographical material supporting the theory that Harry Houdini was, indeed, a secret government agent during the years this trilogy takes place.

== Publication ==
Wonder of the Worlds By Sesh Heri (ISBN 0-9727472-8-1) contains illustrations by the author.

== Trilogy ==
The Wonder of the Worlds trilogy continues in Metamorphosis and The Lost Pleiad.

Wonder of the Worlds was featured at the International Tesla Exhibit in Zurich, Switzerland in 2006.

== See also ==
- Nikola Tesla in popular culture
- Mark Twain in popular culture
