= Paul Malmont =

American author (born 1966)

- Born: March 4, 1966 (age 60); Washington, D.C., U.S.
- Education: New York University
- Writing career
- Genre: Science fiction Historical fiction
- Notable works: The Chinatown Death Cloud Peril (2007) “Jack London in Paradise” (2009); The Astounding, the Amazing, and the Unknown (2011) Doc Savage (2011)

Paul Malmont (born March 4, 1966) is an American author who has specialized in books considering the style and tropes of popular fiction of the past, making the writers of that popular fiction the heroes and protagonists of his own work.

As a marketing executive for DC he produced numerous documentaries and projects celebrating the legacy of the company's superheroes including 450 episodes of the pop culture news and entertainment program, DC Daily.

== Life ==
He was born in Washington, D.C. In his literary debut The Chinatown Death Cloud Peril, published in 2007, Malmont created a 1930s pulp story that featured Walter Gibson (creator of the Shadow), Lester Dent (creator of Doc Savage) and Scientology founder L. Ron Hubbard.

Malmont's second book, Jack London in Paradise (2009) was a historical novel about Jack London. His third book, a sequel to his first novel, was The Astounding, the Amazing, and the Unknown (2011) which featured as its protagonists science-fiction authors Robert Heinlein and Isaac Asimov. In 2010, Malmont wrote the first four issues of DC Comics' Doc Savage comic book with artist Howard Porter and covers by artist J.G. Jones.

Malmont also made a short film, "The King of the Magicians", that was a commendation winner at the UK Festival of Fantastic Films and premiered at the Los Angeles International Film Festival.

Malmont was a senior copywriter and creative director at the advertising agency R/GA in New York City, and since 2014 he has lived in California and worked at DC as executive director of Video Strategy and Content.

== Works ==
- The Chinatown Death Cloud Peril (2007)
- Jack London in Paradise (2009)
- Doc Savage #1-4 (2010)
- The Astounding, the Amazing, and the Unknown (2011)
