= Omar Daniel (composer) =

Canadian composer and pianist

Omar Daniel (born 1960) is a Canadian composer and pianist, and an associate professor of composition at the Western University.

== Early life and education ==
Daniel was born in Toronto, Ontario, and is of Estonian descent. He earned a Doctor of Music degree from the University of Toronto where studied music composition with John Beckwith.

== Career ==
In 1997 he won the Jules Léger Prize for New Chamber Music for his Zwei Lieder nach Rilke, a work for soprano and chamber ensemble. Around that time he created a number of compositions for guitar which were performed at the Winnipeg New Music Festival and recorded by classical guitarist Rachel Gauk.

In 2003, he taught music theory and practice at The Glenn Gould School in Toronto. In 2007 he received the K.M. Hunter Artists Award for classical music. He served on the faculty of Wilfrid Laurier University, and later became an associate professor of composition at the Western University.

Daniel was commissioned to create a non-verbal choral work for the Latvian Radio Choir, who performed it in Toronto in 2018. That year Daniel performed at Chamberfest in Ottawa.

In October 2020, Daniel released a CD, Omar Daniel: Chamber Works, a collection of chamber pieces performed by the Calgary-based Land's End Ensemble as part of a long collaboration between Daniel and the group.

== Selected compositions ==
- Dreams of the Panther (1991)
- The Flaying of Marsyas (2002)
- STELCO (2016)
