= Anne Michaels =

Canadian poet and novelist (born 1958)

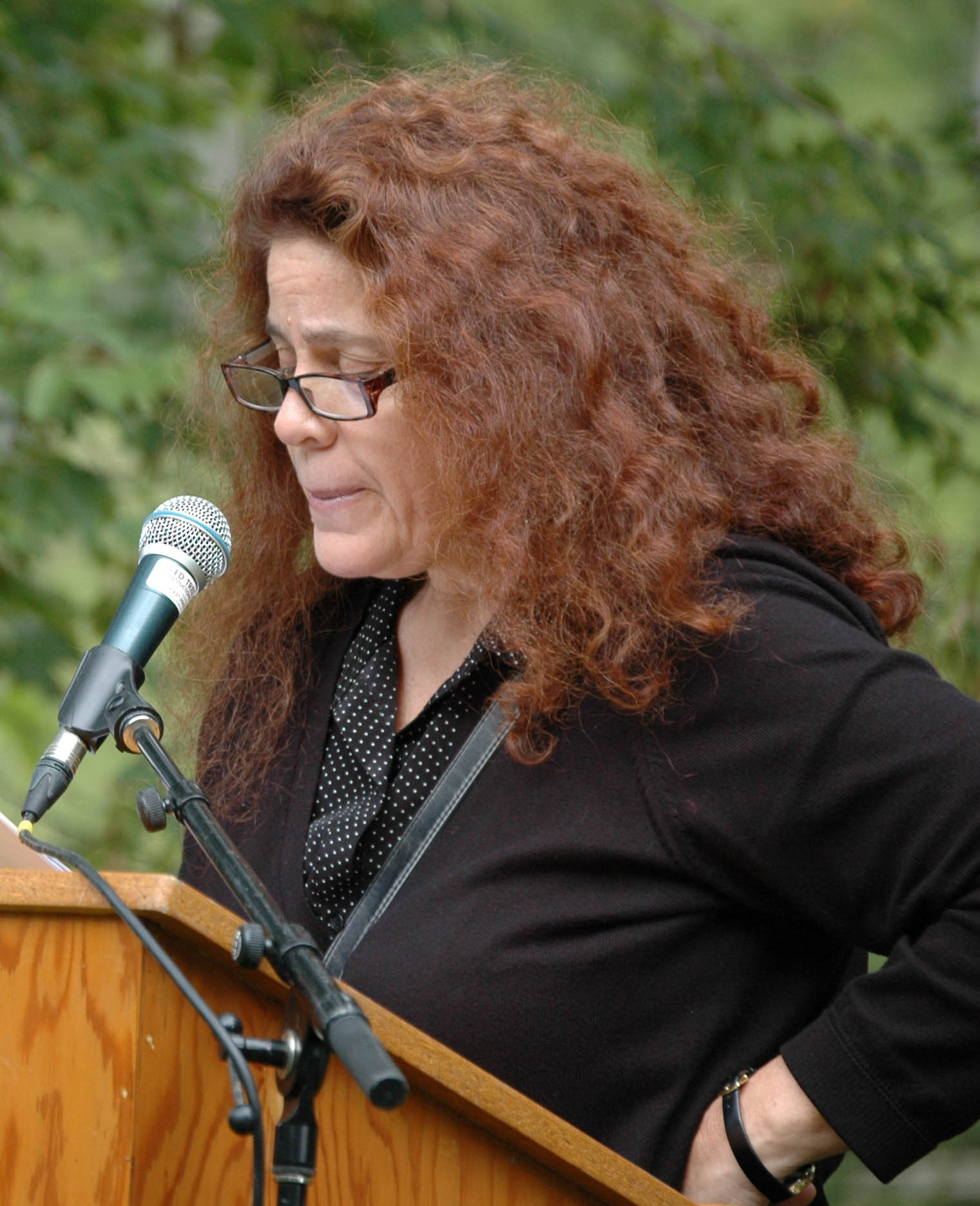
- Michaels in 2013
- Born: 15 April 1958 (age 68); Toronto, Ontario, Canada
- Education: University of Toronto
- Occupations: Novelist, poet
- Years active: 1985–present
- Notable work: Fugitive Pieces, The Winter Vault, The Weight of Oranges, Miner's Pond, Skin Divers, Correspondences
- Website: annemichaels.ca

Anne Michaels (born 15 April 1958) is a Canadian poet and novelist whose work has been translated and published in over 45 countries. Her books have garnered international awards including the Orange Prize for Fiction, the Guardian Fiction Prize, the Lannan Literary Award for Fiction, and the Commonwealth Poetry Prize for the Americas. She was the recipient of a Guggenheim Fellowship and has been shortlisted for the Governor General's Award and the Griffin Poetry Prize, twice shortlisted for the Giller Prize, and twice longlisted for the International Dublin Literary Award. Michaels won a 2019 Vine Award for Infinite Gradation, her first volume of non-fiction. Michaels was the poet laureate of Toronto from 2016 to 2019. She is best known for her novel Fugitive Pieces, which was adapted for the screen in 2007. Michaels won the 2024 Giller Prize for her novel Held.

== Early life ==
Anne Michaels was born in Toronto, Ontario, in 1958. She attended Vaughan Road Academy and later the University of Toronto.

== Career ==
She was the recipient of the Commonwealth Poetry Prize for the Americas in 1986 for The Weight of Oranges and the Canadian Authors Association Award for Poetry in 1992 for Miner's Pond. She was also a finalist for both the Governor General's Award for English-language poetry and the Trillium Book Award for Miner's Pond.

Her debut novel, Fugitive Pieces (1996), offered Michaels the opportunity to work more with complicated questions related to history, identity, location, and grief. With Fugitive Pieces, Michaels lays the thematic foundation of her future works, exploring the relationship between history and memory. Fugitive Pieces, the story of a Holocaust survivor trying to find his way back into the world, was critically acclaimed internationally, winning the Orange Prize for Fiction, the Guardian Fiction Prize, the Lannan Literary Award for Fiction, the Trillium Book Award, the Books in Canada First Novel Award, the City of Toronto Book Award, the Martin and Beatrice Fischer Award, the Ribalow Prize, the Premio letterario Giuseppe Acerbi, and the Jewish Quarterly-Wingate Prize.

While working on her second novel, The Winter Vault, Michaels released Skin Divers, her third poetry collection. All three of her poetry collections were intended to speak to one another, and were later published as Poems (2000).

During this period, Michaels also began writing for the stage. A collaboration with John Berger led to the development of Vanishing Points (2005), a meditation on railways, love, and loss, directed by Simon McBurney, produced by Complicité, and presented in the German Gymnasium, London. This work was later turned into Railtracks (2011). She also contributed the libretto to Canadian composer Omar Daniel's The Passion of Lavinia Andronicus (2005), focusing on the figure of Lavinia from William Shakespeare's Titus Andronicus, in a performance by the Hilliard Ensemble and Tafelmusik Chamber Choir.

Michaels published The Winter Vault in 2009, thirteen years following the release of Fugitive Pieces, which had likewise taken nearly a decade to write. Like Fugitive Pieces, her second novel considers deeply the relationship between historic and intimate events, grief, memory, and memorialization. The novel connects three historic events – the dismantling and reconstruction of Egypt's Abu Simbel, the building of the St. Lawrence Seaway in Canada its drowning of towns and villages, and the rebuilding of Warsaw after World War II. The Winter Vault garnered international praise and was a finalist for the Scotiabank Giller Prize, the Trillium Book Award, and the Commonwealth Prize, and was also longlisted for the International Dublin Literary Award.

In 2011, Michaels contributed to the Bush Theatre's 24-hour performance of Sixty-Six Books to mark the 400th anniversary of the King James Bible, which provided 66 playwrights, poets, songwriters, and novelists of all faiths and none from countries across five continents the opportunity to respond to stories in the Bible. Her contribution, "The Crossing," was later anthologized in Sixty-Six Books: 21st Century Writers Speak to the King James Bible (2011). An extract from "The Crossing" was also performed at Westminster Abbey's King James Bible Service for Queen Elizabeth II, Prince Philip, and Prince Charles.

Michaels returned to poetry with the release of her book-length poem, Correspondences (2013), an historic and personal elegy in an accordion-style format that can be read frontwards or backwards. A collaboration with artist Bernice Eisenstein, Correspondences alternates poetry with tributes to 20th-century writers and thinkers. The work received the Helen and Stan Vine Canadian Jewish Book Award for Poetry and was shortlisted for the Griffin Poetry Prize.

In October 2015, Michaels began her tenure as the Poet Laureate of Toronto, succeeding George Elliott Clarke. In 2015 Michaels also released her first children's book, The Adventures of Miss Petitfour, with its follow-up, The Further Adventures of Miss Petitfour, being released in 2022.

In 2017, her poetry collection All We Saw and her non-fiction work Infinite Gradation (with an afterword by poet Gareth Evans) were published. Both books were shortlisted for the 2019 Vine Awards for Canadian Jewish Literature in the Poetry and Non-Fiction categories respectively. Infinite Gradation won the Non-Fiction prize.

Michaels published her third novel, Held, in November 2023. It was shortlisted for the 2024 Booker Prize and won the 2024 Giller Prize.

In 2023, she was elected as a Royal Society of Literature International Writer.

She is a creative writing mentor in the Department of English at the University of Toronto.

== Publications ==
=== Poetry collections ===
- The Weight of Oranges (1986)
- Miner's Pond (1991)
- Skin Divers (1999)
- Poems (2000)
- Railtracks (with Simon McBurney, 2011)
- Correspondences (2013)
- All We Saw (2017)

=== Novels ===
- Fugitive Pieces (1996)
- The Winter Vault (2009)
- Held (2023)

=== Theatre works ===
- The Passion of Lavinia Andronicus (with Omar Daniel, 2005)
- Vanishing Points (with Simon McBurney, 2005)
- "The Crossing" in Sixty-Six Books (2011)

=== Other books ===
- Sea of Lanterns (with Ewa Monika Zebrowski, 2012)
- The Adventures of Miss Petitfour (with Emma Block, 2015)
- Infinite Gradation (2017)
- The Further Adventures of Miss Petitfour (with Emma Block, 2022)

== Awards ==
Year	Nominated work	Award	Category	Result	Ref.
1986	The Weight of Oranges	Commonwealth Poetry Prize	Americas	Winner	
1991	Miner's Pond	Governor General's Award	English-language poetry	Finalist	
1992	Miner's Pond	Trillium Book Award		Finalist	
1992	Miner's Pond	Canadian Authors Association Award	Poetry	Winner	
1996	Fugitive Pieces	International Dublin Literary Award		Longlist	
1996	Fugitive Pieces	Scotiabank Giller Prize		Finalist	
1997	Fugitive Pieces	Orange Prize		Winner	
1997	Fugitive Pieces	Guardian Fiction Prize		Winner	
1997	Fugitive Pieces	Lannan Literary Award	Fiction	Winner	
1997	Fugitive Pieces	Trillium Book Award	English	Winner	
1997	Fugitive Pieces	Books in Canada First Novel Award		Winner	
1997	Fugitive Pieces	City of Toronto Book Award		Winner	
1997	Fugitive Pieces	Canadian Jewish Book Award	Martin and Beatrice Fischer Prize for Fiction	Winner	
1998	Fugitive Pieces	Ribalow Prize		Winner	
1998	Fugitive Pieces	Jewish Quarterly-Wingate Prize	Fiction	Winner	
2001	Fugitive Pieces	Premio letterario Giuseppe Acerbi		Winner	
2009	The Winter Vault	Scotiabank Giller Prize		Finalist	
2010	The Winter Vault	Trillium Book Award	English	Finalist	
2010	The Winter Vault	Commonwealth Writers' Prize	Best Book (Canada and the Caribbean)	Finalist	
2010	The Winter Vault	International Dublin Literary Award		Longlist	
2014	Correspondences	Griffin Poetry Prize		Finalist	
2014	Correspondences	Canadian Jewish Book Award	Poetry	Winner	
2024	Held	Booker Prize		Finalist	
2024	Held	Scotiabank Giller Prize		Winner	
2024	Held	Prix Transfuge	Meilleur roman anglo-saxon	Winner	

== Adaptations ==
Fugitive Pieces was directed and adapted for the screen by Jeremy Podeswa and selected to open the 2007 Toronto International Film Festival. The novel was also adapted by Roger James Elsgood into a radio drama for BBC Radio 3 in 1999.

Skin Divers was adapted in 2009 for the National Ballet of Canada by Dominique Dumais with music by Gavin Bryars. Incorporating spoken word and visual projections, Skin Divers explores "the body as a living archive of experience, or a museum of memory."
