= Mark Twain Middle School =

Mark Twain Middle School can refer to:

- Mark Twain School for the Gifted and Talented in Brooklyn, New York
- Mark Twain Middle School in Mar Vista, Los Angeles
- Mark Twain Middle School (Virginia)
