= Biff Brewster =

Book character

- First book of the series, Brazilian Gold Mine Mystery (1960)
- Author: Andy Adams
- Country: United States
- Language: English
- Genre: Adventure; Mystery
- Publisher: Grosset & Dunlap
- Published: 1960–1965
- Media type: Print

Biff Brewster is the central character in a series of 13 adventure and mystery novels for adolescent boys written by Andy Adams. The series was published by Grosset & Dunlap between 1960 and 1965.

Most titles were published in hardcover with full color dustjackets, but, like other Grosset & Dunlap juvenile series of the era, production costs were cut by dispensing with the dust jackets and featuring full color cover illustrations in their stead. This occurred only with the last three books in the series, and later reprints of the first three.

== List of titles ==
1. Brazilian Gold Mine Mystery (1960)
2. Mystery of the Chinese Ring (1960)
3. Hawaiian Sea Hunt Mystery (1960)
4. Mystery of the Mexican Treasure (1961)
5. African Ivory Mystery (1961)
6. Alaska Ghost Glacier Mystery (1961)
7. Mystery of the Ambush in India (1962)
8. Mystery of the Caribbean Pearls (1962)
9. Egyptian Scarab Mystery (1963)
10. Mystery of the Tibetan Caravan (1963)
11. British Spy Ring Mystery (1964)
12. Mystery of the Arabian Stallion (1964)
13. Mystery of the Alpine Pass (1965)

== List of characters ==
- Biff Brewster: Leading protagonist
