= Danilo Šerbedžija =

Croatian film director

Danilo Šerbedžija (born 1971) is a Croatian film director. His debut feature film, 72 Days (2010), was selected as the Croatian entry for the Best Foreign Language Film at the 84th Academy Awards, but it did not make the final shortlist.

Danilo Šerbedžija's father, Rade, and sister, Lucija, are actors.

== Filmography ==
- 72 Days (2010)
- The Liberation of Skopje (2016)
- Tereza37 (2020)
- Dražen (2024)
