= The Astounding, the Amazing, and the Unknown =

2011 novel by Paul Malmont

- dust cover of The Astounding, the Amazing, and the Unknown
- Author: Paul Malmont
- Language: English
- Genre: Historical
- Publisher: Simon & Schuster
- Publication date: 2011
- Publication place: United States
- Media type: Print (hardback)
- Pages: 418 pp
- ISBN: 978-1-4391-6893-6
- Preceded by: The Chinatown Death Cloud Peril

The Astounding, the Amazing, and the Unknown is an alternate historical adventure novel written by Paul Malmont, the sequel to The Chinatown Death Cloud Peril (2007). It features real-life pulp magazine authors of the past as the heroes of adventures reminiscent of their favored genres. The book was first published in hardcover by Simon & Schuster and audiobook by Brilliance Audio in July 2011. The title is drawn from those of the magazines, Astounding Science-Fiction, Amazing Stories, and Unknown, for which his main protagonists wrote.

== Plot ==
The story, divided into short, numbered "episodes" rather than chapters, is presented as a "story about Nikola Tesla" recounted by Richard Feynman to a group of other Manhattan Project scientists in the wake of World War II. It involves the efforts of a similar think-tank, the Kamikaze Group, to uncover the secret of a rumored "super-weapon" Tesla had developed before his death, one supposedly responsible for the mysterious Tunguska explosion of 1908. Feynman makes no claims for the tale's veracity, a caution warranted at the end of the book when his informant is revealed to have been pulp writer L. Ron Hubbard, a participant in the novel's events portrayed as a self-promoting, delusional narcissist.

Malmont bases the Kamikaze Group on the trio of science fiction writers, Robert A. Heinlein, L. Sprague de Camp and Isaac Asimov, who in actual history spent most of the war doing aeronautical engineering research for the U.S. Navy at the Philadelphia Naval Shipyard's Naval Air Experimental Station. He portrays them as engaged in a joint project there to develop super-scientific weapons to help the U.S. win the war, though in reality they worked separately on technical improvements to airplanes and weapons systems. Heinlein leads the fictional project, which also draws on the assistance of other pulp authors of his acquaintance, most notably Hubbard, Walter B. Gibson, and Lester Dent, with cameo roles by John W. Campbell, Norvell Page, Hugh B. Cave, Frederik Pohl, Cleve Cartmill, Kurt Vonnegut, Judith Merril, and Ray Bradbury. Additional historical luminaries such as Jack Parsons, Albert Einstein and Jimmy Stewart also put in appearances.

After Tesla's mysterious death the military raids his apartment and confiscates his papers, spurred by apparent German interest in his discoveries. Heinlein is charged with investigating the supposed "wonder weapon" referred to in the papers. Together with de Camp, Asimov, Hubbard and Gibson he explores a sub-basement of the Empire State Building where Tesla had left some of his equipment, and is almost trapped there by an unknown adversary. Further inquiries take the core group to the former site of Wardenclyffe Tower, the inventor's Wireless transmission facility in Shoreham, New York, which apparently doubled as the "sending" component of the weapon. Afterwards Hubbard is sent first to the Aleutian Islands and then the South Pacific to retrieve the receiver, while Asimov is put in charge of securing the capacitors needed to make the transmitter work.

Meanwhile, government goons are investigating the group itself, alarmed by the publication of Cartmill's story "Deadline," with its all-too accurate description of a nuclear weapon similar to that being developed by the Manhattan Project. Their brutal interrogation of Heinlein is interrupted by a deadly phone call via which they are somehow electrocuted in the same fashion as Tesla. Matters come to a head as the Kamikaze Group seemingly makes good a promise to "make a ship disappear" (a nod to the "Philadelphia Experiment" urban legend), while Heinlein, convinced that time is running out, works with Tesla's ex-assistant at a duplicate of Wardencyffe Tower to make the wonder weapon functional. Once it is activated the assistant reveals himself as the group's prime adversary, and nearly succeeds in killing the group members before falling to his death in the pits beneath the tower.

After the villain's defeat the military shuts down the Kamikaze Group. Heinlein is disheartened to discover that his group was conceived and regarded as a mere blind to distract the Axis powers from the U.S.'s real super weapon effort—the Manhattan Project. His assertions of the reality of Tesla's weapon fall on deaf ears.

Much later, Hubbard, returning to the U.S. after the war, learns what has become of his former compatriots, encounters Feynman, and tells him the story.

== Reception ==
Michael Dirda, writing for The Washington Post, feels the novel "never quite lives up to its title. It opens slowly, breaks up its narrative among too many different characters and plot lines, and is unpersuasively framed as a story related by physicist Richard Feynman. Frequent comic episodes, some verging on slapstick, don't wholly come off. Nor are the big scenes - involving secret tunnels underneath the Empire State Building or the final showdown at Tesla's Tower - altogether fresh. I couldn't follow much of the science, and Hubbard's feverish dreams reminded me of accounts of bad LSD trips." He concludes, however, that "if you're already a fan of any of the writer-heroes of this novel, you'll probably be irresistibly drawn to The Astounding, the Amazing, and the Unknown. And the book does have some good moments. It's almost worth reading just to arrive at the pronouncement: 'Oh my God! . . . You've vaporized Isaac Asimov!'"

Rege Behe in the Pittsburgh Tribune calls the book "humorous and clever, . . . an opus waiting for Hollywood to call." In reference to the book's title he notes that it "is all of those things, a joyous romp grounded in the golden age of science and pulp fiction in the 1940s. The author's cast . . . are wonderfully realized."

Paul Di Filippo in The Speculator "applaud[s] its vigorous storytelling and historical acumen," calling the book's style "by turns analytical, journalistic, affectionate, elegiac, philosophical, and, well, pulpish. [Malmont] reconstructs his characters and their era with historical fidelity and empathy without feeling chained to total textbook accuracy . . . [blending] verisimilitude with outlandish blood-and-thunder action" in a "seething scrum of high-minded conversation and low-down deeds . . . Malmont plainly has a blast recreating this dangerous, promising era and putting its inhabitants through their larger-than-life paces." Di Filippo does twit the author for his anachronistic use of the term "sci-fi," not coined until the late 1950s, but feels that "[t]aken all in all, the book delivers both thrills and meditative reflections on the writerly condition."

The book was also reviewed by Amy Goldschlager in Locus, no. 612, January 2012.
