= Lenka Udovički =

Serbian theater director

- Ленка Удовички
- Born: February 11, 1967 (age 59); Belgrade, SR Serbia, SFR Yugoslavia
- Occupations: director; activist
- Spouse: Rade Šerbedžija (m. 1991)

Lenka Udovički (Serbian Cyrillic: Ленка Удовички; born February 11, 1967) is a Serbian theater director, opera director and activist based in Croatia. She is the artistic director of Ulysses Theater and co-founder of the School of Acting and Media at the University of Rijeka. She is married to actor Rade Šerbedžija.

== Education and early life ==
She was educated at the Faculty of Dramatic Arts in Belgrade where she began her career directing theatre across former Yugoslavia. ("Women in Colorful Skirts" by M. Bjelić, "Praying for a Little Luck" by S. Andjelić and L. Udovički, "Chamber Music" by Arthur Kopita, "Deadly Motorism" by A. Popović, "Opera for Two Dinars" by B. Nušić, her own adaptation, "Mother Courage" by B. Brecht adapted by Borislav Vujčić, "Antigone" by Dušan Jovanović).

== Moving Theatre Company ==
In 1994, she joined Vanessa Redgrave, Corin Redgrave, Kiki Markham and Ekkehart Schall as co-founder of the Moving Theatre Company. For the Moving Theatre directed "Waterfall" by V. Stevanović, "Arsonists" by Max Frisch with Frances de la Tour (Riverside Studio), "The Consul" by Menotti (Leighton House), "Necessary Targets" by Eve Ensler.

== Ulysses Theatre ==
For Ulysses Theatre directed a number of performances in the past 15 years, and in 2012 became the artistic director of the Ulysses Theatre. Notable Brijuni projects are the theatrical blockbuster King Lear, Medea, Marat/Sade, Core Sample, Hamlet, Drunken Night 1918, Romeo and Juliet in '68, The Tempest, Cabaret Brecht – Rise of Arturo Ui, Deceased, Shakespeare in the Kremlin and Antigone – 2000 years later.

== Other notable works ==
She directed “History’s Rhyme” for English National Opera Studio in London's Limelight club and “The Tempest" by William Shakespeare in Shakespeare's Globe Theatre with Vanessa Redgrave, and the premiere of the opera “A Better Place” by Martin Butler for the English National Opera. For Opera Circus she directed the premiere of the sevdah opera “Differences in Demolition” by Nigel Osborne and "Shoreline...Story of Love and War" (in co-production with the Scottish Ballet and the Hebrides Ensemble).

For the UCLA Live festival in 2009 she directed Euripides' Medea with Annette Bening in the title role.

In 2013, she directed a multimedia project "Henry V" by William Walton with the Zagreb Philharmonic conducted by Sir Neville Marriner in the Vatroslav Lisinski concert hall in Zagreb.

== Academic career ==
Worked a visiting professor at the California Institute of the Arts and UCLA in Los Angeles. In 2011, co-operating with Nataša Govedić, she directed the performance of "Unbreakable String – Workers in Culture" for workers in textile industry, supporting former workers of Kamensko factory, who themselves also participated in the performance.

In 2012, together with Rade Serbedzija, she founded the School of Acting and Media at the University of Rijeka, where she teaches acting.

== Recent activity ==
In 2017, she has signed the Declaration on the Common Language of the Croats, Serbs, Bosniaks and Montenegrins.
