= Fugitive Pieces =

1996 novel by Anne Michaels

- First edition (publ. McClelland & Stewart)
- Author: Anne Michaels
- Publisher: McClelland & Stewart
- Publication date: May 11, 1996
- Awards: Trillium Book Award (1996); Books in Canada First Novel Award (1997); Guardian Fiction Prize (1997); Orange Prize for Fiction (1997); Toronto Book Award (1997); Jewish Quarterly-Wingate Prize (1998)
- ISBN: 978-0-771-05883-7

Fugitive Pieces is a novel by the Canadian poet and novelist Anne Michaels. The story is divided into two sections. The first centers around Jakob Beer, a Polish Holocaust survivor, while the second involves a man named Ben, the son of two Holocaust survivors. It was first published in Canada in 1996 and was published in the United Kingdom the following year. The novel has won awards such as Books in Canada First Novel Award, the Trillium Book Award, Orange Prize for Fiction, Guardian Fiction Prize and the Jewish Quarterly-Wingate Prize. It was on Canada's bestseller list for more than two years and has been translated into over 20 different languages.

== Plot ==
The novel is divided into Book I and Book II.

=== Book I ===
Jakob Beer is a seven-year-old child of a Jewish family living in Poland. His house is stormed by Nazis; he escapes the fate of his parents and his sister, Bella, by hiding behind the wallpaper in a cabinet. He hides in the forest, burying himself up to the neck in the soil. After some time, he meets an archaeologist, Athos Roussos, working on Biskupin. Roussos secretly takes him to Zakynthos in Greece. Roussos is also a geologist and is fascinated with ancient wood and stones. Jakob learns Greek and English, but finds that learning new languages erases his memory of the past. After the war, Roussos and Jakob move to Toronto, where after several years Jakob meets Alexandra in a music library. She is a fast-paced, outspokenly philosophical master of wordplay. Jakob and Alex fall in love and marry, but the relationship fails because she expects Jakob to change too fast and abandon his past. He dwells constantly on his memories of Bella, especially her piano-playing, and they end up divorcing. Jakob meets and marries Michaela, a much younger woman who seems to understand him, and with her help he is able to let go of Bella. Together, they move to Greece into the former home of several generations of the Roussos family.

=== Book II ===
The second part of the book is told from the perspective of Ben, a Canadian professor of Jewish descent who was born in Canada to survivors of the Holocaust. In 1954, the family home in Weston, Ontario, is destroyed by Hurricane Hazel. Ben becomes an expert on the history of weather and marries a girl named Naomi. He is a big admirer of Jakob's poetry and respects the way he deals with the Holocaust, while Ben himself has trouble coping with the horrors his parents must have endured. At the end of the novel, Ben is sent to retrieve Jakob's journals from his home in Greece, where Ben spends hours swimming in Jakob's past.

== Main characters ==
- Jakob Beer — The only survivor of his town who is found and rescued by Athos. He is an intelligent boy who later becomes a renowned poet.
- Athos Roussos— A geologist who rescues Jakob and becomes his guardian. He teaches Jakob about the beauty of science and also the world.
- Ben — An admirer of Jakob and his poetry. He travels to Greece to find Jakob's journals.

== Theme, style and structure ==
Fugitive Pieces contains themes of trauma, grief, loss and memory, primarily in relation to the Holocaust, which Michaels explores via metaphors such as nature. The work is told in a poetic style, which has caused some critics to view it as an elegy, and others, such as Donna Coffey, to feel that it re-imagines the literary telling of the Holocaust and also of nature. The story is told through two narratives, in the first part Jakob's, and in the second part Ben's, which are connected through one main event that had an effect on both narrators. John Mullan wrote that he feels that the book shows how the Holocaust and traumatic moments can impact generations of survivors and their family members. Fugitive Pieces also contains mentions of the senses, which are shown through an emphasis of Jakob hearing what happened to his family, rather than seeing the event take place, which in turns adds to his trauma and his inability to gain closure. Similarly, Ben has only heard stories but never had first hand experience. Michaels uses this to convey a paradox between what we hear, the language, and then the silence that follows due to the suffering and trauma of others.

The title of the novel is taken from Fugitive Pieces, Lord Byron's first volume of verse, privately printed in autumn 1806.

== Reception ==
Fugitive Pieces was on Canada's bestseller list for more than two years and has been translated into over 20 different languages.

Michaels has received praise from media outlets and academics such as John Mullan of University College London and Michiko Kakutani. It received starred reviews from Booklist, Kirkus Reviews, and Publishers Weekly. On 5 November 2019, the BBC included Fugitive Pieces on its list of the "list of 100 'most inspiring' novels".

Awards for Fugitive Pieces
Year	Award	Result	Ref.
1996	Scotiabank Giller Prize	Shortlist	
1996	Trillium Book Award	Winner	
1997	Books in Canada First Novel Award	Winner	
1997	Guardian Fiction Prize	Winner	
1997	Orange Prize for Fiction	Winner	
1997	Toronto Book Award	Winner	
1998	Jewish Quarterly-Wingate Prize	Winner	

== Film adaptation ==
The novel was made into a feature film produced by Robert Lantos through his Toronto-based Serendipity Point Films Inc. It opened at the 2007 Toronto International Film Festival. It was directed by Jeremy Podeswa, based on his screenplay adaptation of the Michaels novel. It stars Stephen Dillane as Jakob Beer and Rade Šerbedžija as Athos.
