= Mošorin =

Mošorin Мошорин (Serbian)
- Village (Selo)
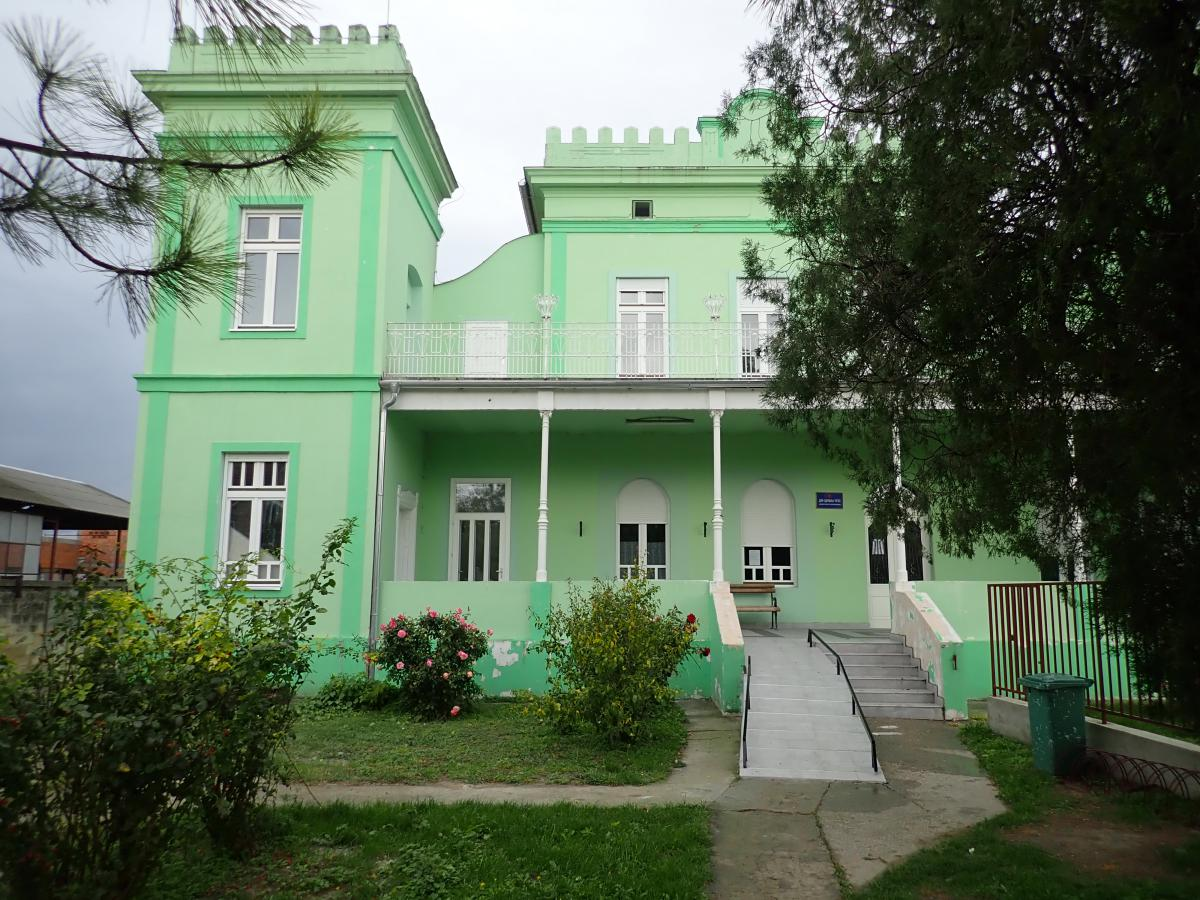
- Vila Vlaškalić

- Location within Vojvodina Location within Serbia Location within Europe
- Coordinates: 45°18′N 20°10′E
- Country: Serbia
- Province: Vojvodina
- District: South Bačka District
- Municipality: Titel

Area
  - Total: 41.3 km^{2} (15.9 sq mi)
- Elevation: 111 m (364 ft)

Population (2011)
  - Total: 2,569
  - Density: 62.2/km^{2} (161/sq mi)
- Time zone: UTC+1 (CET)
  - Summer (DST): UTC+2 (CEST)

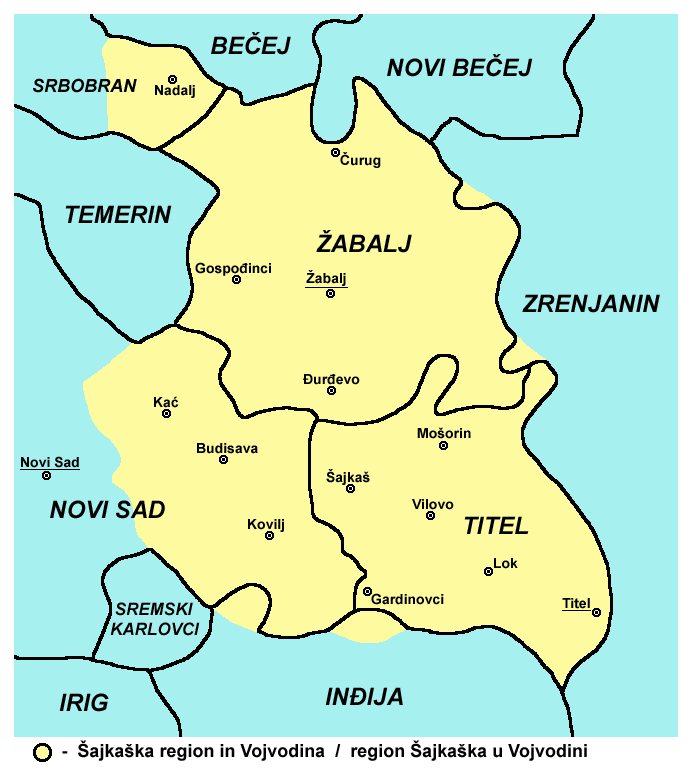
Map of the Titel municipality and Šajkaška region, showing the location of Mošorin

Mošorin (Serbian Cyrillic: Мошорин; Hungarian: Mozsor) is a village located in the Titel municipality, South Bačka District, Vojvodina, Serbia. The village has a Serb ethnic majority and its population numbering 2,569 people (as of the 2011 census).

== History ==
The village was first mentioned in the 16th century. During the Ottoman rule (16th-17th century), it was populated by ethnic Serbs. From 1699, it was under Habsburg rule, and was part of the Habsburg Military Frontier (Šajkaš Battalion). From 1848 to 1849, Mošorin was part of Serbian Vojvodina, a Serbian autonomous region within the Austrian Empire, but from 1849, it was again part of the Military Frontier until 1873, when it was included into the Bačka-Bodrog County.

From 1918, Mošorin was part of the Kingdom of Serbs, Croats and Slovenes (later known as Yugoslavia). Between 1918 and 1922 it was part of the Bačka County, between 1922 and 1929 part of the Belgrade Oblast, and between 1929 and 1941 part of the Danube Banovina.

In 1941, the village was occupied by Axis troops and attached to Horthy's Hungary. In a 1942 raid, performed on Orthodox Christmas, the Hungarian troops killed 205 villagers, including 94 men, 41 women, 44 children and 26 elderly, of whom 170 were Serbs, 34 Romani, and 1 Hungarian. Some of the corpses of the killed villagers were thrown into the icy waters of the river Tisa, while some were buried into four mass graves.

Axis occupation ended in 1944. From then on, Mošorin was part of the new Socialist Yugoslavia. Between 1992 and 2003 it was part of the Federal Republic of Yugoslavia, between 2003 and 2006 part of Serbia and Montenegro, and since 2006, has been part of the independent Serbia.

== Demographics ==
Historical population
Year	Pop.	±% p.a.
1961	2,906	—
1971	2,694	−0.75%
1981	2,483	−0.81%
1991	2,552	+0.27%
2002	2,763	+0.72%
2011	2,569	−0.81%

As of the 2011 census, the village of Mošorin has a population of 2,569 inhabitants.

== Famous people from Mošorin ==
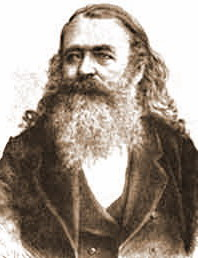
Svetozar Miletić (1826-1901)

- Svetozar Miletić (1826–1901), the political leader of Serbs in Vojvodina
- Isidora Sekulić (1877–1958), a famous Serbian literate, academic
- Dušan Kanazir (1921–2009), a Serbian molecular biologist
- Mladen Dražetin (1951–2015), Doctor of Social Sciences, intellectual, economist, theatrical creator, poet, writer and philosopher. He was born and died in Novi Sad, but spent part of his childhood in Mošorin, where his father Rada is from originally.
- Milan Radin (1991–), football player

== Family names of the villagers ==
Some prominent families in the village include: Bačkalić, Banjac, Bedov, Bugarin, Dimitrov, Dražeta, Dudarin, Đurđević, Etinski, Ivošev, Ivanović, Jelovac, Jovanović, Jurišin, Kanazir, Karanov, Kirćan, Kozarev, Kolarić, Krunić, Kuruca, Maletin, Marić, Marjanov, Miletić, Milnović, Mirosavljev, Nestorović, Pantelemonov, Petakov, Požarev, Rakić, Ranisavljev, Savin, Svirčev, Sekulić, Stanojev, Subotin, Suzić, Tubić, Vlaškalić, etc.

== See also ==
- Šajkaška
- South Bačka District
- Bačka
- List of places in Serbia
- List of cities, towns and villages in Vojvodina
- Moshoryne
