= Sekulić =

Sekulić (Serbian Cyrillic: Секулић) is a surname found among Croats and Serbs.

The Croatian Heraldic and Vexillological Association records a noble family of Sekulić, based on Ivan Bojničić's Der Adel von Kroatien und Slavonien, an 1899 book of Coats of Arms of Croatia and Slavonia.

Notable people with the surname Sekulić include:

- Aleksander Sekulić (born 1978), Slovenian basketball coach
- Blagota Sekulić (born 1982), Montenegrin basketball player
- Boris Sekulić (born 1991), Serbian football defender
- Branislav Sekulić (1906–1968), Yugoslav football player and manager
- Danilo Sekulić (born 1990), Serbian football midfielder
- Dara Sekulić (1930–2021), Serbian poet
- Dragica Sekulić (born 1980), Montenegrin politician
- Goga Sekulić (born 1977), Montenegrin Serb turbo folk singer
- Isidora Sekulić (1877–1958), Serbian prose writer, novelist, essayist, adventurer, polyglot and art critic
- Martin Sekulić (1833–1905), Croatian physics teacher
- Milos Sekulic (born 1989), Swedish tennis player of Serbian descent
- Nemanja Sekulić (born 1994), Montenegrin footballer
- Peter Sekulic (born 1962), Canadian politician of Croatian origin
- Philip Sekulic (born 2003), Australian tennis player
- Radislav Sekulić (born 1985), Montenegrin football player
- Sava Sekulić (1902–1989), Serbian painter
- Tony Sekulic (born 1974), Australian football player

== See also ==
- Sekula
