= Karlovac Gymnasium =

Coordinates: 45°29′9″N 15°33′21″E

- Gimnazija Karlovac
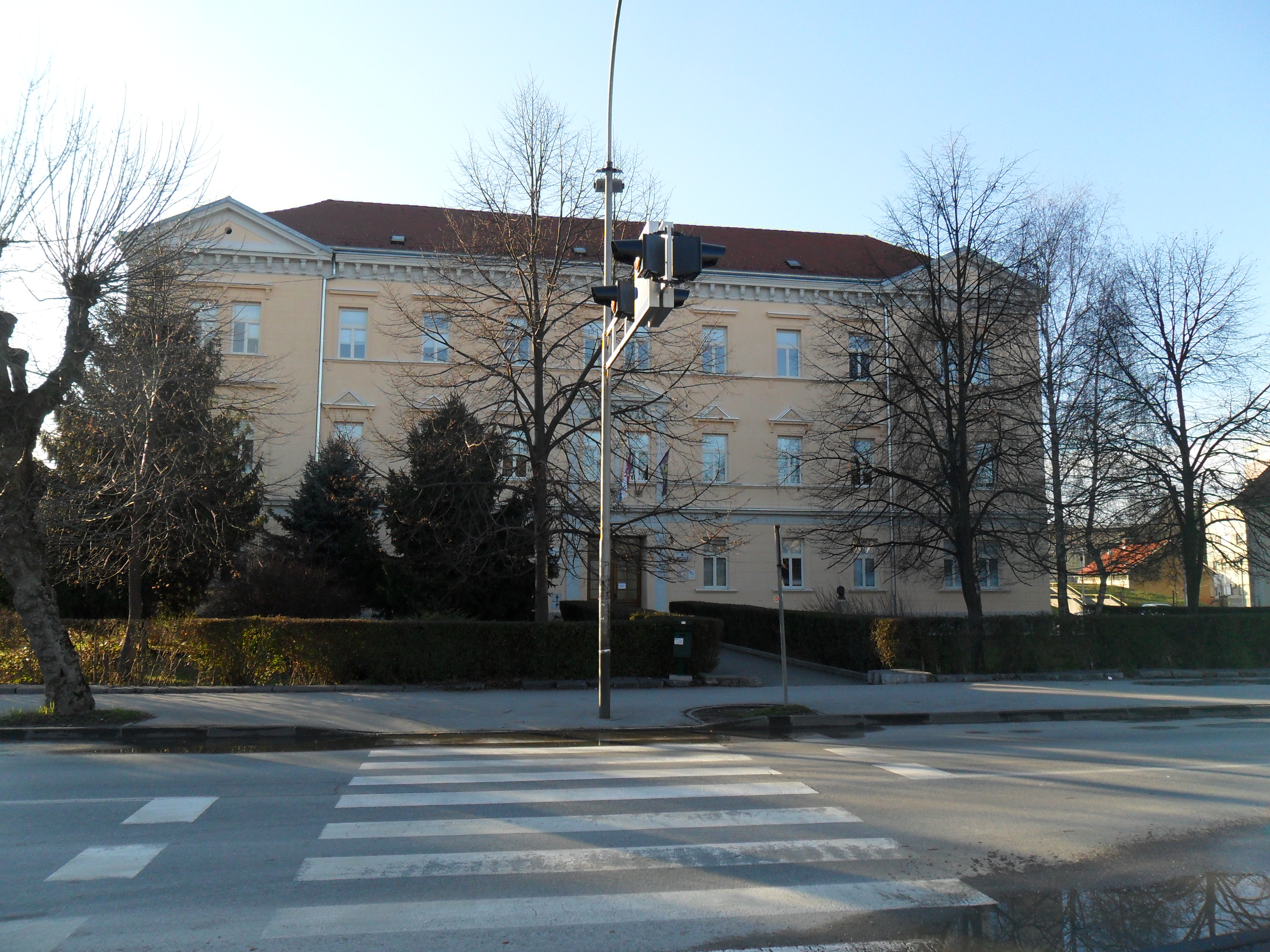

Location
- Rakovac 4 Karlovac, 47000; Croatia

Information
- Type: public
- Founded: 1766; 260 years ago
- Principal: Snježana Štranjgar
- Website: Gymnasium Karlovac (in Croatian)

Karlovac Gymnasium (Croatian: Gimnazija Karlovac), sometimes historically referred to as Higher Real Gymnasium, is a secondary school (gymnasium) located in the city of Karlovac in Croatia.

== Description ==
Housed in a dedicated building constructed in 1863, the school considers itself to have been founded as early as 1766. Starting in 1766 and under the direction of Maria Theresa of Austria, piarists were sent to Karlovac to teach subjects to two grade levels, the main subject being the Latin language. At that time, Karlovac was part of the Croatian Military Frontier under the rule of the Austrian Empire, before becoming a Free Royal City in 1781.

In early 2010 the gymnasium was accepted as the 37th member of the German global school network in Croatia. This designation allows students to attend German universities without having to complete the usual prerequisite German language entrance examination.

== Alumni ==
After the school year 2023/24, 118 graduates of this gymnasium enrolled at an institution of higher learning in Croatia, or 100% of students who took up the nationwide Matura exams. The most common destinations for these students were the University of Zagreb faculties of economics, electrical engineering and computing, law, science, and medicine.

=== Notable alumni ===
The inventor, electrical and mechanical engineer Nikola Tesla, who attended the school from 1870 until 1873 (age of 14 to 17), attributes his interest in electricity to what he learned at Karlovac. In his 1919 autobiography My Inventions he wrote that demonstrations by his "professor of physics" sparked his interest in this "mysterious phenomena" and made him want "to know more of this wonderful force". Stricken with malaria shortly after his arrival in the mosquito-infested swampy lowlands of Karlovac, he was bedridden at times and often took his school books home to read and memorize when he was unable to attend class. He graduated with honours from the four-year course in only three years.

Other notable alumni include actress Zrinka Cvitešić, poet and writer Ivan Goran Kovačić, politician and founder of the Croatian Peasant Party Stjepan Radić and explorers and brothers Mirko and Stjepan Seljan.

== Notable teachers ==
- Martin Sekulić
