= Rakić =

Rakić is a Slavic surname from Serbia and Parts of Croatia, and may refer to:

- Abby Rakic-Platt (born 1993), British actress
- Aleksandar Rakić (footballer) (born 1987), Serbian footballer
- Aleksandar Rakić (born 1992), Austrian mixed martial artist of Serbian origin
- Andy Rakic (born 1980), Australian (soccer) football player
- Dragana Rakić (born 1973), Serbian politician
- Dušan Rakić (1943–2020), Yugoslav and Serbian naval officer
- Đorđe Rakić (born 1985), Serbian football player
- Goran Rakić (born 1971), Kosovo Serb politician
- Katarina Rakić (born 1979), Serbian politician
- Ljubisav Rakić (born 1931), Serbian neurobiologist, professor and academic
- Luka Rakić (born 1991), Montenegrin sprinter
- Milan Rakić (1876–1938), Serbian poet
- Milan Rakič (born 1981), Serbian footballer
- Milica Rakić (1996–1999), child victim of the NATO bombing of Yugoslavia
- Miljan Rakić (born 1986), Serbian-Hungarian basketball player
- Miodrag Rakić (1975–2014), Serbian politician
- Mirjana Rakić (born 1948), Croatian journalist
- Mita Rakić (1846–1890), Serbian writer and politician
- Paško Rakić (born 1933), Serbian neuroscientist
- Patricia Goldman-Rakic (1937–2003), American professor of neuroscience
- Predrag Rakić, Bosnian drummer and music manager
- Tijana Rakić (born 1987), Serbian beauty queen
- Tomislav Rakić (born 1934), Serbian chess master
- Vićentije Rakić (1750–1818), Serbian writer, poet, priest, philanthropist
- Vojin Rakić (born 1967), Serbian philosopher and political scientist
