= Martin Sekulić =

Croatian mathematician and physicist (1833–1905)

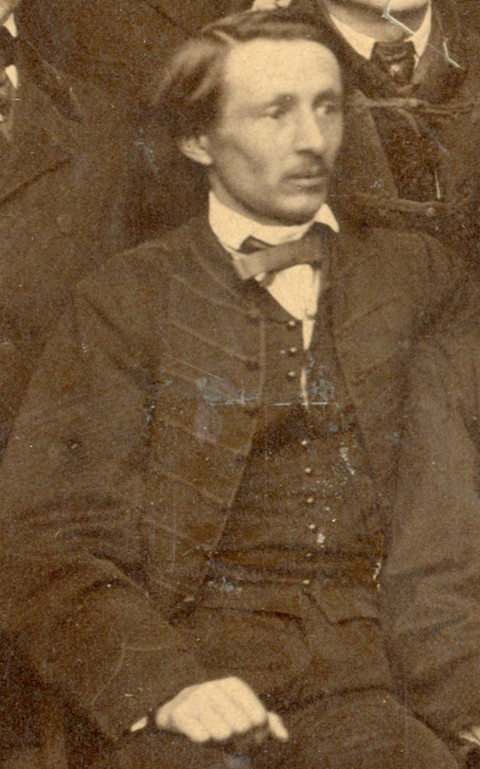
- Born: 1833; Lovinac, Austrian Empire
- Died: 1905; Zagreb, Austria-Hungary

Signature
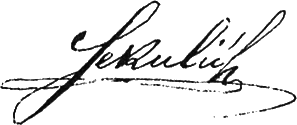

Martin Sekulić (1833–1905) was a mathematics and physics teacher from Karlovac, one of the few high-school professors who were members of the Croatian community of physicists at the time.

== Biography ==
Martin Sekulić was born in Lovinac. He taught at the Higher Real School in Rakovac (today Karlovac).

He was a corresponding member (Croatian: dopisni član) of the Yugoslav Academy of Sciences and Arts. He was also a member of the Croatian pedagogic and literary society (Hrvatski pedagogijsko-književni zbor).

He published several articles in German-language journals, such as in the Annalen der Physik in 1872 and 1875. He published several works in the Rad journal of the Yugoslav Academy of Sciences and Arts, such as Fluorescencija i calcescencija (1871) and Iztraživanje sunčane duge (1873). In the 1871 treatise, he explains the effect of the luminescence in some elements and in the 1873 one he talks about the visible spectrum of the sun's light. In the 1871 treatise, Sekulić also predicted the existence of electromagnetic oscillations at different frequencies.

During the period in which Martin Sekulić was the custodian of the science cabinet of his high school, he would inform his students of the very latest discoveries in the world of physics, and by the school year 1880/81 they had amassed a total of 277 machines for demonstration purposes, including a spectroscope modified by Sekulić himself.

Sekulić died in Zagreb.

== Legacy ==
The inventor Nikola Tesla noted in his 1919 autobiography My Inventions that when he attended the Kraljevska Velika Realka in Rakovac (Karlovac) between 1870 and 1873, demonstrations of electricity by his "professor of physics" sparked his interest in this "mysterious phenomena" and made him want "to know more of this wonderful force". The details of who was teaching physics at that time and the nature of the demonstrations described have led some to conclude this professor was Martin Sekulić. In his biography of Tesla, Ćiril Petešić notes that Tesla does not mention which professor this was by name, but thinks the evidence points to it being prof. Martin Sekulić.

== Sources ==
- Petešić, Ćiril (1976). Genij s našeg kamenjara: život i djelo Nikole Tesle [The genius from our rocks: life and work of Nikola Tesla] (in Croatian). Zagreb: Školske novine. OCLC 36439558.
- Vukelja, Tihomir (2008). "Zajednica fizičara u Banskoj Hrvatskoj početkom 20. stoljeća" [The community of physicists in Croatia proper at the start of the 20th century]. Studia lexicographica (in Croatian). 2 (3). Miroslav Krleža Institute of Lexicography: 71–99. ISSN 2459-5578 – via Hrčak.
- Paušek-Baždar, Snježana (2002). "Prirodoznanstvena sredina u doba hrvatske moderne" [The realm of natural sciences at the time of Modernity in Croatia]. Hvar City Theatre Days (in Croatian). 28 (1). Croatian Academy of Science and Split Literary Circles and Arts: 237–246. ISSN 1849-0255.
