= Nikola Tesla =

Serbian-American engineer and inventor (1856–1943)

- Никола Тесла
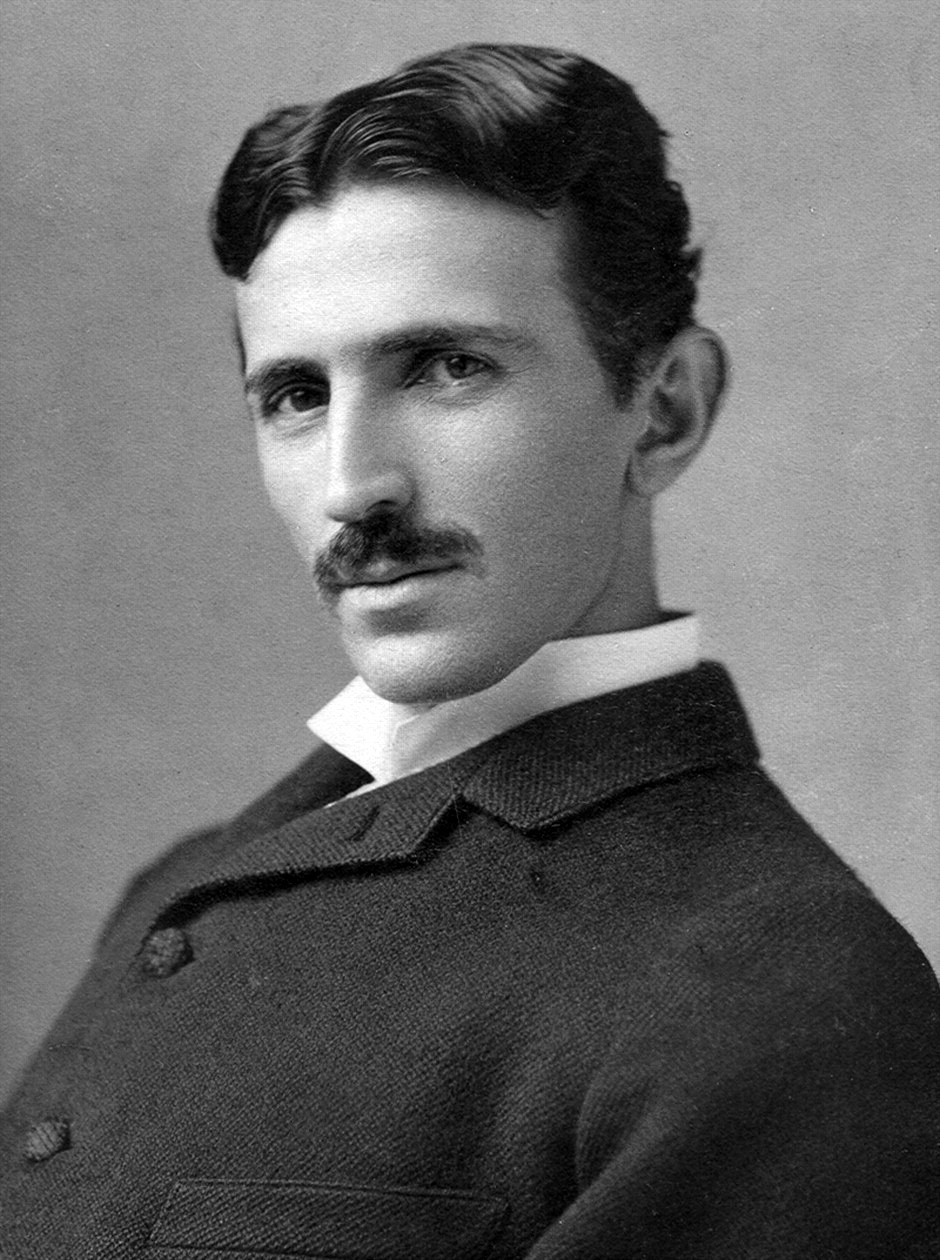
- Tesla, c. 1890
- Born: 10 July 1856; Smiljan, Austrian Empire (now in Croatia)
- Died: 7 January 1943 (aged 86); New York City, U.S.
- Resting place: Nikola Tesla Museum, Belgrade, Serbia
- Citizenship: Austria (until 1891); U.S. (from 1891)
- Education: Imperial-Royal Technical College in Graz (dropped out)
- Occupations: Engineer; futurist; inventor
- Awards: Order of St. Sava (1892); Elliott Cresson Medal (1894); Order of Prince Danilo I (1895); AIEE Edison Medal (1916); Order of the Yugoslav Crown (1931); John Scott Medal (1934); Order of the White Eagle (1937); Order of the White Lion (1937)
- Engineering career
- Discipline: Electrical engineering; Mechanical engineering
- Projects: Wireless power transfer
- Significant design: Induction motor
- Significant advance: Polyphase electric power

Nikola Tesla (Note: English: /ˈnɪkələ ˈtɛslə/; Serbian Cyrillic: Никола Тесла; pronounced [nǐkola têsla]) (10 July 1856 – 7 January 1943) was a Serbian-American engineer, futurist, and inventor. He is known for his contributions to the design of the modern alternating current (AC) electricity supply system.

Born and raised in the Austro-Hungarian Empire, Tesla first studied engineering and physics in the 1870s without receiving a degree. He then gained practical experience in the early 1880s working in telephony and at Continental Edison in the new electric power industry. In 1884, he migrated to the United States, where he became a naturalized citizen. He worked for a short time at the Edison Machine Works in New York City before he struck out on his own. With the help of partners to finance and market his ideas, Tesla set up laboratories and companies in New York to develop a range of electrical and mechanical devices. His AC induction motor and related polyphase AC patents, licensed by Westinghouse Electric in 1888, earned him a considerable amount of money and became the cornerstone of the polyphase system, which Westinghouse marketed.

Tesla conducted a range of experiments with mechanical oscillators/generators, electrical discharge tubes, and early X-ray imaging among other things, in an attempt to develop inventions he could patent and market. He built a wirelessly controlled boat, one of the first wirelessly controlled vehicles ever produced. Tesla became well known as an inventor and demonstrated his achievements to celebrities and wealthy patrons at his lab. He was noted for his showmanship at public lectures. Throughout the 1890s, Tesla pursued his ideas for wireless lighting and worldwide wireless electric power distribution in his high-voltage, high-frequency power experiments in New York and Colorado Springs. In 1893, he made pronouncements on the possibility of wireless communication with his devices. Tesla tried to put these ideas to practical use in his unfinished Wardenclyffe Tower project, an intercontinental wireless communication and power transmitter, but ran out of funding before he could complete it.

After Wardenclyffe, Tesla experimented with a series of inventions in the 1910s and 1920s with varying degrees of success. Having spent most of his money, Tesla lived in a series of New York hotels, leaving behind unpaid bills. He died in New York City in January 1943. Tesla's work fell into relative obscurity following his death, until 1960, when the General Conference on Weights and Measures named the International System of Units (SI) measurement of magnetic flux density the tesla in his honor. There has been a resurgence in popular interest in Tesla since the 1990s. In 2013, Time magazine named him one of the 100 most significant figures of all time.

== Early years ==
=== Childhood ===
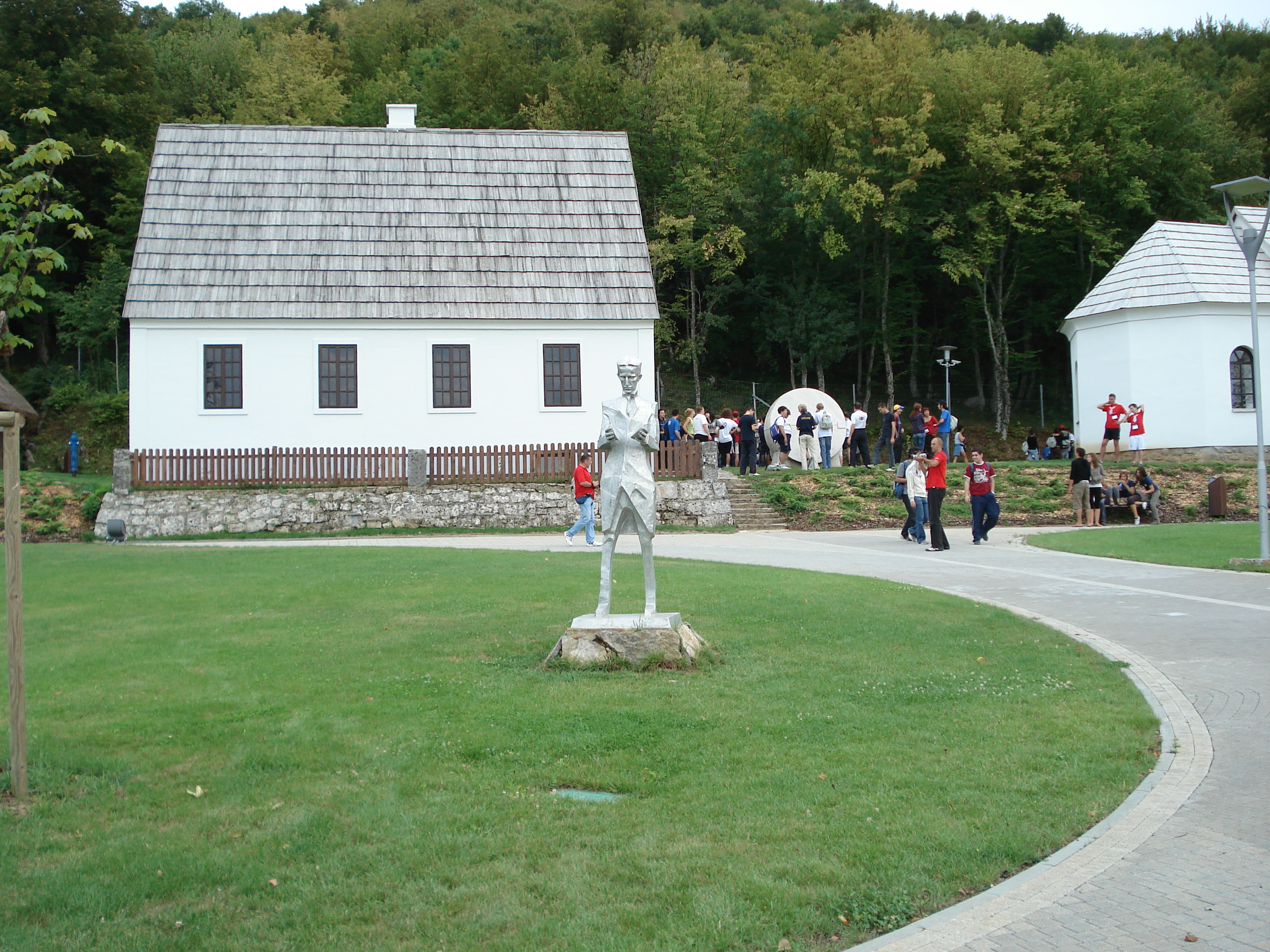
Tesla's rebuilt birth house (parish hall) and the church where his father served in Smiljan. In his honor, the Nikola Tesla Memorial Center museum was established on the site.

Tesla was born into a family of ethnic Serbs on 10 July 1856 in Smiljan, then part of the Military Frontier of the Austrian Empire and now part of Croatia. His father, Milutin Tesla (1819–1879), was a priest of the Eastern Orthodox Church. His father's brother Josif was a lecturer at a military academy who wrote several textbooks on mathematics.

Tesla's mother, Georgina "Đuka" Mandić (1822–1892), whose father was also an Eastern Orthodox priest, had a talent for making home craft tools and mechanical appliances and the ability to memorize Serbian epic poems. Đuka had never received a formal education. Tesla credited his eidetic memory and creative abilities to his mother's genetics and influence.

Tesla was the fourth of five children. In 1861, Tesla attended primary school in Smiljan where he studied German, arithmetic, and religion. In 1862, the Tesla family moved to the nearby town of Gospić, where Tesla's father worked as parish priest. Nikola completed primary school, followed by middle school. Later in his patent applications, before he obtained American citizenship, Tesla would identify himself as "of Smiljan, Lika, border country of Austria-Hungary".

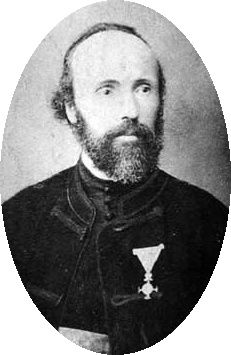
Tesla's father, Milutin, was an Orthodox priest in the village of Smiljan.

In 1870, Tesla moved to Karlovac to attend high school at the Higher Real Gymnasium where the classes were held in German. Tesla later wrote that he became interested in his physics professor's demonstrations of electricity. (Note: Tesla does not mention which professor this was by name, but some sources conclude it was Martin Sekulić.) The "mysterious phenomena" made him want "to know more of this wonderful force". He was able to perform integral calculus in his head, prompting his teachers to believe that he was cheating. He studied three years at the gymnasium, graduating in 1873 at the age of 17.

After graduating, Tesla returned to Smiljan but soon contracted cholera, was bedridden for nine months and was near death several times. In a moment of despair, Tesla's father (who had originally wanted him to enter the priesthood), promised to send him to the best engineering school if he recovered from the illness. Tesla later said that he had read Mark Twain's earlier works while recovering from his illness.

=== Youth ===
The next year, Tesla evaded conscription into the Austro-Hungarian Army in Smiljan by running away to Tomingaj, a village in the southeast of Lika, near Gračac. There he explored the mountains wearing hunter's garb. Tesla said that this contact with nature made him stronger, both physically and mentally. He enrolled at the Imperial-Royal Technical College in Graz in 1875 on a Military Frontier scholarship. Tesla passed nine exams (nearly twice as many as required) and received a letter of commendation from the dean of the technical faculty to his father, which stated, "Your son is a star of first rank." At Graz, Tesla was fascinated by the lectures on electricity presented by professor Jakob Pöschl. But by his third year, he was failing in school and never graduated, leaving Graz in December 1878. One biographer suggests Tesla was not studying and may have been expelled for gambling and womanizing.

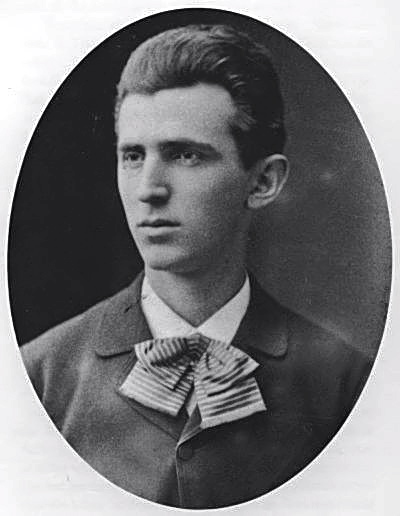
Tesla aged 23, c. 1879

Tesla's family did not hear from him after he left school. There was a rumor among his classmates that he had drowned in the nearby river Mur, but in January one of them ran into Tesla in the town of Maribor and reported that encounter to Tesla's family. It turned out Tesla had been working there as a draftsman for 60 florins per month. In March 1879, Milutin finally located his son and tried to convince him to return home and take up his education in Prague. Tesla returned to Gospić later that month when he was deported for not having a residence permit. Tesla's father died the next month, on 17 April 1879, at the age of 60 after an unspecified illness.

In January 1880, two of Tesla's uncles paid for him to leave Gospić for Prague, where he was to study. He arrived too late to enroll at Charles-Ferdinand University; he had never studied Greek, a required subject; and he was illiterate in Czech, another required subject. He attended lectures in philosophy at the university as an auditor, but he did not receive grades for the courses.

Tesla moved to Budapest, Hungary, in 1881 to work under Tivadar Puskás at a telegraph company, the Budapest Telephone Exchange. Upon arrival, Tesla realized that the company, then under construction, was not functional, so he worked as a draftsman in the Central Telegraph Office instead. Within a few months, the Budapest Telephone Exchange became functional, and Tesla was allocated the chief electrician position. Tesla later described how he made many improvements to the Central Station equipment including an improved telephone repeater or amplifier.

== Working at Edison ==
In 1882, Tivadar Puskás got Tesla another job in Paris with the Continental Edison Company. Tesla began working in what was then a brand new industry, installing indoor incandescent lighting citywide in large scale electric power utility. The company had several subdivisions and Tesla worked at the Société Electrique Edison, the division in the Ivry-sur-Seine suburb of Paris, in charge of installing the lighting system. There he gained a great deal of practical experience in electrical engineering. Management took notice of his advanced knowledge in engineering and physics, and soon had him designing and building improved versions of generating dynamos and motors.

=== Moving to the United States ===
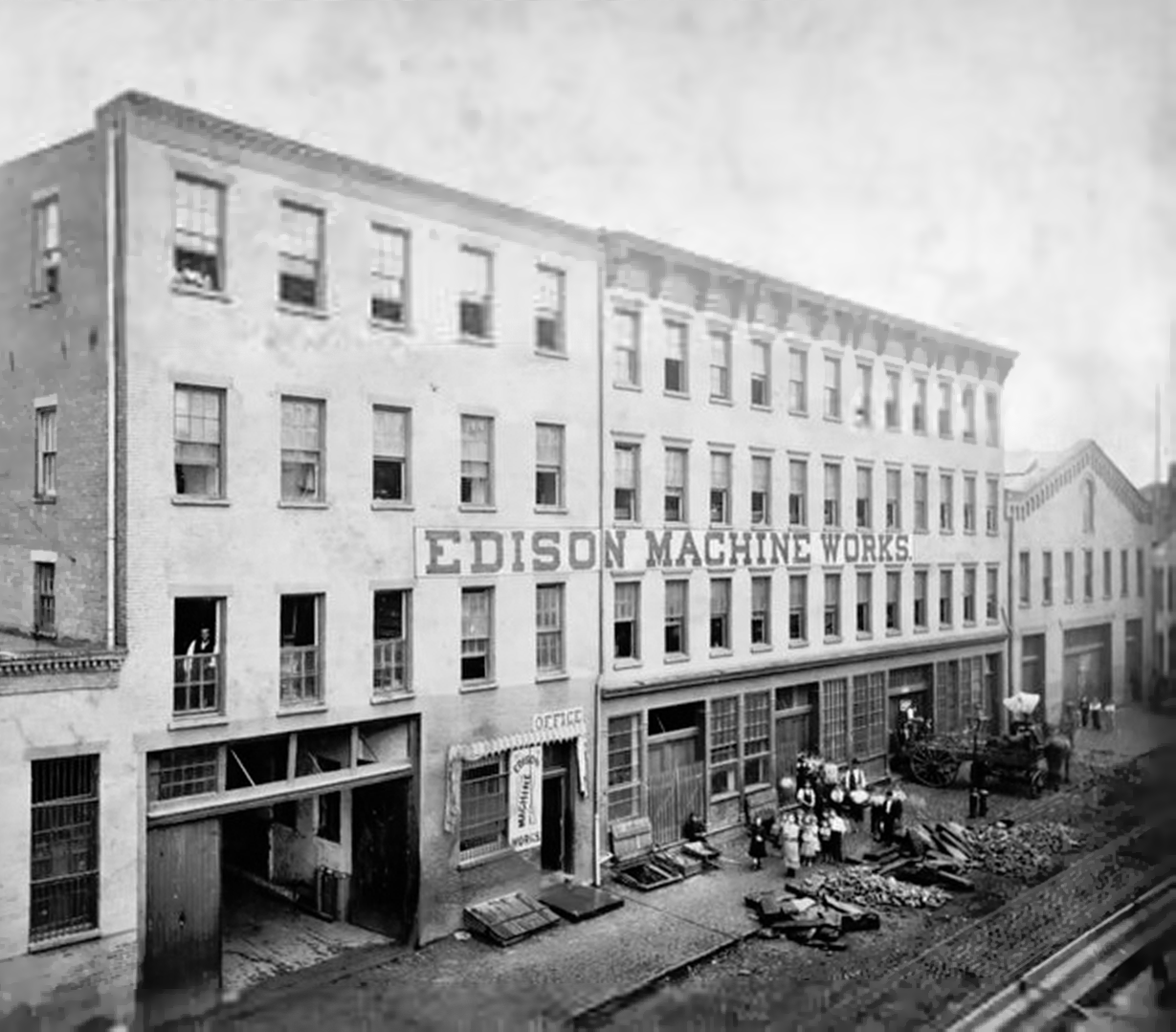
Edison Machine Works on Goerck Street, New York. Tesla found the change from cosmopolitan Europe to working at this shop, located among the tenements on Manhattan's lower east side, a "painful surprise".

In 1884, Edison manager Charles Batchelor, who had been overseeing the Paris installation, was brought back to the United States to manage the Edison Machine Works, a manufacturing division situated in New York City, and asked that Tesla be brought to the United States as well. In June 1884, Tesla emigrated and began working almost immediately at the Machine Works on Manhattan's Lower East Side, an overcrowded shop with a workforce of several hundred machinists, laborers, managing staff, and 20 "field engineers" struggling with the task of building the large electric utility in that city. As in Paris, Tesla was working on troubleshooting installations and improving generators.

Historian W. Bernard Carlson notes Tesla may have met company founder Thomas Edison only a couple of times. One of those times was noted in Tesla's autobiography where, after staying up all night repairing the damaged dynamos on the ocean liner SS Oregon, he ran into Batchelor and Edison, who made a quip about their "Parisian" being out all night. After Tesla told them he had been up all night fixing the Oregon, Edison commented to Batchelor that "this is a damned good man". One of the projects given to Tesla was to develop an arc lamp–based street lighting system. Arc lighting was the most popular type of street lighting but it required high voltages and was incompatible with the Edison low-voltage incandescent system, causing the company to lose contracts in some cities. Tesla's designs were never put into production, possibly because of technical improvements in incandescent street lighting or because of an installation deal that Edison made with an arc lighting company.

Tesla had been working at the Machine Works for a total of six months when he quit. What event precipitated his leaving is unclear. It may have been over a bonus he did not receive, either for redesigning generators or for the arc lighting system that was shelved. Tesla had previous run-ins with the Edison company over unpaid bonuses he believed he had earned. In his autobiography, Tesla stated the manager of the Edison Machine Works offered a $50,000 bonus to design "twenty-four different types of standard machines", "but it turned out to be a practical joke". Later versions of this story have Thomas Edison himself offering and then reneging on the deal, quipping: "Tesla, you don't understand our American humor". The size of the bonus in either story has been noted as odd, since Machine Works manager Batchelor was stingy with pay, (Note: Tesla's contemporaries remembered that on a previous occasion Machine Works manager Batchelor had been unwilling to give Tesla a $7 a week pay raise.) and the company did not have that amount of cash (equal to $1,791,667 today) on hand. Tesla's diary contains just one comment on what happened at the end of his employment, a note he scrawled across the two pages covering 7 December 1884, to 4 January 1885, saying "Good By to the Edison Machine Works".

== Tesla Electric Light and Manufacturing ==
Soon after leaving the Edison company, Tesla was working on patenting an arc lighting system, possibly the same one he had developed at Edison. In March 1885, he met with patent attorney Lemuel W. Serrell, the same attorney used by Edison, to obtain help with submitting the patents. Serrell introduced Tesla to two businessmen, Robert Lane and Benjamin Vail, who agreed to finance an arc lighting manufacturing and utility company in Tesla's name, the Tesla Electric Light and Manufacturing Company. Tesla worked for the rest of the year obtaining the patents that included an improved DC generator, the first patents issued to Tesla in the US, and building and installing the system in Rahway, New Jersey.

The investors showed little interest in Tesla's ideas for new types of alternating current motors and electrical transmission equipment. After the utility was up and running in 1886, they decided that the manufacturing side of the business was too competitive and opted to simply run an electric utility. They formed a new utility company, abandoning Tesla's company and leaving the inventor penniless. Tesla even lost control of the patents he had generated, since he had assigned them to the company in exchange for stock. He had to work at various electrical repair jobs and as a ditch digger for $2 per day. Later in life, Tesla recounted that part of 1886 as a time of hardship, writing "My high education in various branches of science, mechanics and literature seemed to me like a mockery". (Note: Account comes from a letter Tesla sent in 1938 on the occasion of receiving an award from the National Institute of Immigrant Welfare)

== AC and the induction motor ==
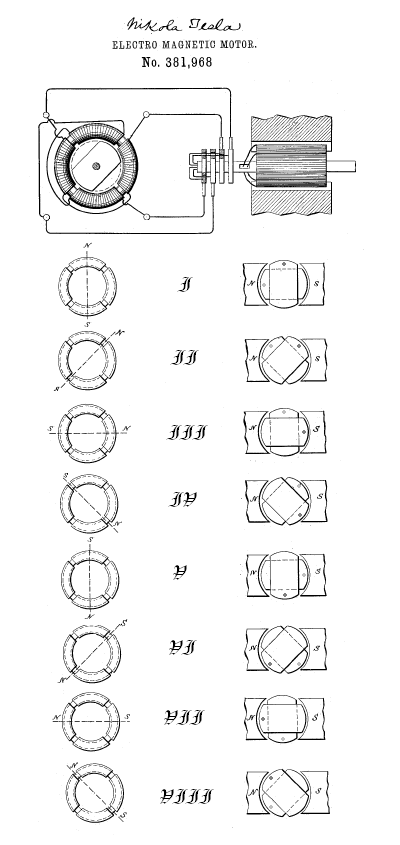
Drawing from U.S. patent 381,968, illustrating the principle of Tesla's alternating current induction motor

In late 1886, Tesla met Alfred S. Brown, a Western Union superintendent, and New York attorney Charles Fletcher Peck. The two men were experienced in setting up companies and promoting inventions and patents for financial gain. Based on Tesla's new ideas for electrical equipment, including a thermo-magnetic motor idea, they agreed to back the inventor financially and handle his patents. Together they formed the Tesla Electric Company in April 1887, with an agreement that profits from generated patents would go 1/3 to Tesla, 1/3 to Peck and Brown, and 1/3 to fund development. They set up a laboratory for Tesla at 89 Liberty Street in Manhattan, where he worked on improving and developing new types of electric motors, generators, and other devices.

In 1887, Tesla developed an induction motor that ran on alternating current (AC), a power system format that was rapidly expanding in Europe and the United States because of its advantages in long-distance, high-voltage transmission. The motor used polyphase current, which generated a rotating magnetic field to turn the motor (a principle that Tesla claimed to have conceived in 1882). This innovative electric motor, patented in May 1888, was a simple self-starting design that did not need a commutator, thus avoiding sparking and the high maintenance of constantly servicing and replacing mechanical brushes.

Along with getting the motor patented, Peck and Brown arranged to get the motor publicized, starting with independent testing to verify it was a functional improvement, followed by press releases sent to technical publications for articles to run concurrently with the issue of the patent. Physicist William Arnold Anthony (who tested the motor) and Electrical World magazine editor Thomas Commerford Martin arranged for Tesla to demonstrate his AC motor on 16 May 1888 at the American Institute of Electrical Engineers. Engineers working for the Westinghouse Electric & Manufacturing Company reported to George Westinghouse that Tesla had a viable AC motor and related power system—something Westinghouse needed for the alternating current system he was already marketing. Westinghouse looked into getting a patent on a similar commutator-less, rotating magnetic field-based induction motor developed in 1885 and presented in a paper in March 1888 by Italian physicist Galileo Ferraris, but decided that Tesla's patent would probably control the market.

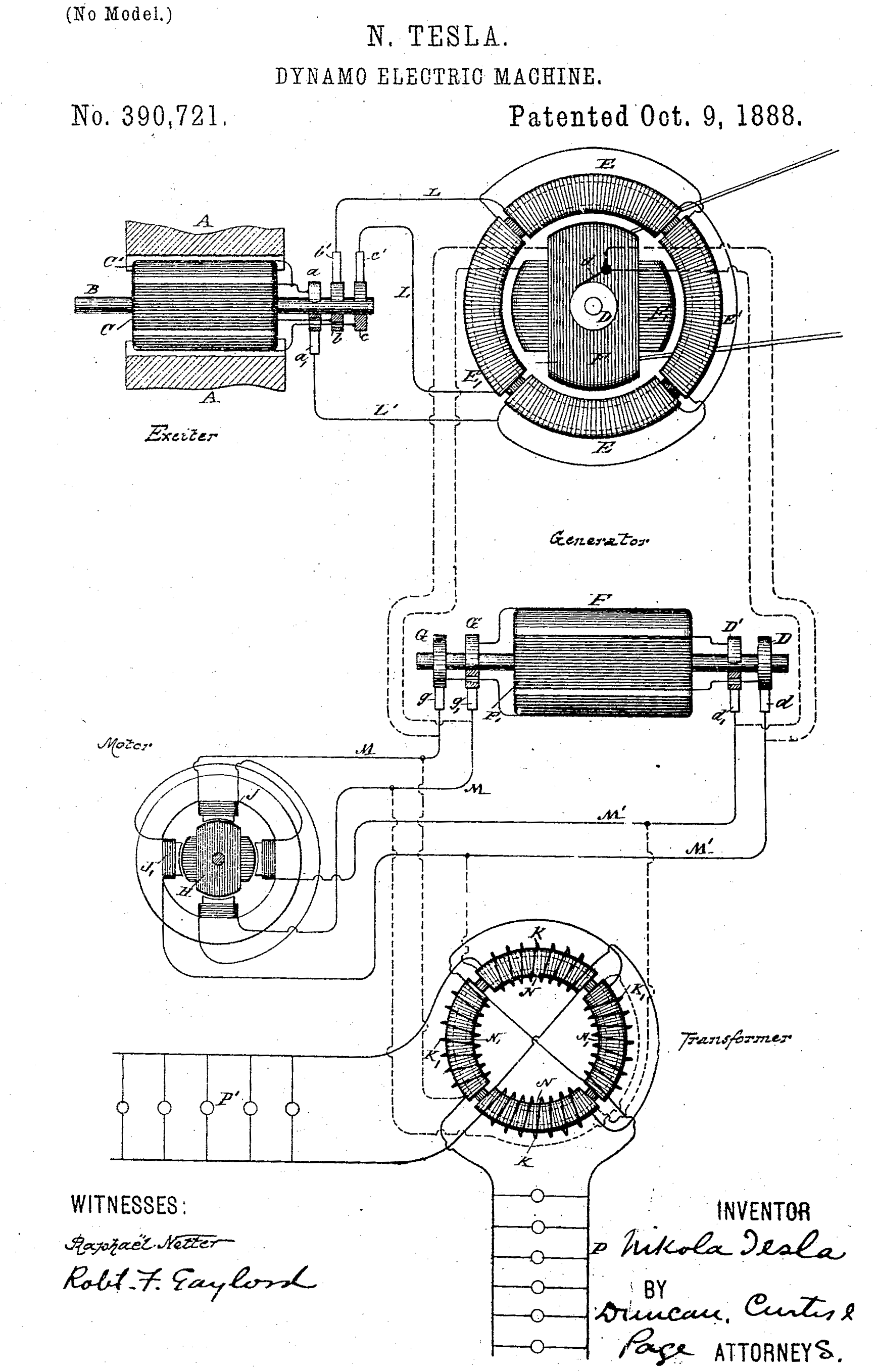
Tesla's AC dynamo-electric machine (AC electric generator) in an 1888 U.S. patent 390,721

In July 1888, Brown and Peck negotiated a licensing deal with George Westinghouse for Tesla's polyphase induction motor and transformer designs for $60,000 in cash and stock and a royalty of $2.50 per AC horsepower produced by each motor. Westinghouse also hired Tesla for one year for the large fee of $2,000 ($71,700 in today's dollars) per month to be a consultant at the Westinghouse Electric & Manufacturing Company's Pittsburgh labs.

During that year, Tesla worked in Pittsburgh, helping to create an alternating current system to power the city's streetcars. He found it a frustrating period because of conflicts with the other Westinghouse engineers over how best to implement AC power. Between them, they settled on a 60-cycle AC system that Tesla proposed (to match the working frequency of Tesla's motor), but they soon found that it would not work for streetcars, since Tesla's induction motor could run only at a constant speed. They ended up using a DC traction motor instead.

=== Market turmoil ===
Tesla's demonstration of his induction motor and Westinghouse's subsequent licensing of the patent, both in 1888, came at the time of extreme competition between electric companies. The three big firms, Westinghouse, Edison, and Thomson-Houston Electric Company, were trying to grow in a capital-intensive business while financially undercutting each other. There was even a "war of currents" propaganda campaign underway, with Edison Electric claiming their direct current system was better and safer than the Westinghouse alternating current system and Thomson-Houston sometimes siding with Edison. Competing in this market meant Westinghouse would not have the cash or engineering resources to develop Tesla's motor and the related polyphase system right away.

Two years after signing the Tesla contract, Westinghouse Electric was in trouble. The near collapse of Barings Bank in London triggered the financial panic of 1890, causing investors to call in their loans to Westinghouse Electric. The sudden cash shortage forced the company to refinance its debts. The new lenders demanded that Westinghouse cut back on what looked like excessive spending on acquisition of other companies, research, and patents, including the per motor royalty in the Tesla contract. At that point, the Tesla induction motor had been unsuccessful and was stuck in development. Westinghouse was paying a $15,000-a-year guaranteed royalty even though operating examples of the motor were rare and polyphase power systems needed to run it were even rarer.

In early 1891, George Westinghouse explained his financial difficulties to Tesla in stark terms, saying that, if he did not meet the demands of his lenders, he would no longer be in control of Westinghouse Electric and Tesla would have to "deal with the bankers" to try to collect future royalties. The advantages of having Westinghouse continue to champion the motor probably seemed obvious to Tesla and he agreed to release the company from the royalty payment clause in the contract. Six years later Westinghouse purchased Tesla's patent for a lump sum payment of $216,000 as part of a patent-sharing agreement signed with General Electric (a company created from the 1892 merger of Edison and Thomson-Houston).

== New York laboratories ==
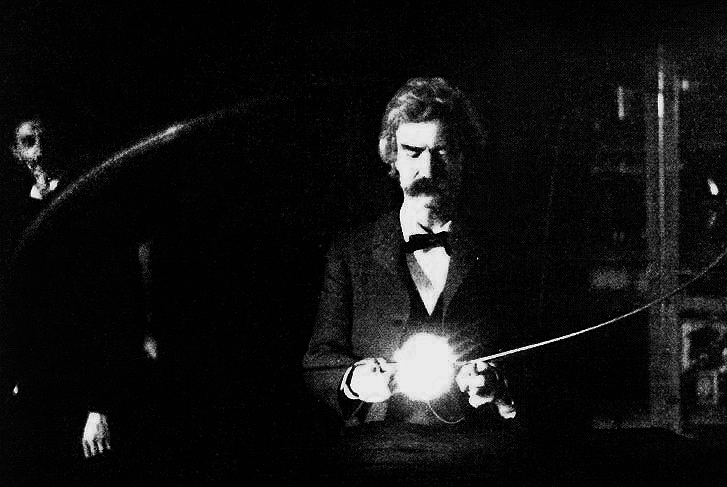
Mark Twain in Tesla's South Fifth Avenue laboratory, 1894

The money Tesla made from licensing his AC patents made him independently wealthy and gave him the time and funds to pursue his own interests. In 1889, Tesla moved out of the Liberty Street shop Peck and Brown had rented and for the next dozen years worked out of a series of workshop/laboratory spaces in Manhattan. These included a lab at 175 Grand Street (1889–1892), the fourth floor of 33–35 South Fifth Avenue (1892–1895), and sixth and seventh floors of 46 & 48 East Houston Street (1895–1902).

=== Tesla coil ===
In the summer of 1889, Tesla traveled to the 1889 Exposition Universelle in Paris and learned of Heinrich Hertz's 1886–1888 experiments that proved the existence of electromagnetic radiation, including radio waves. In repeating and then expanding on these experiments, Tesla tried powering a Ruhmkorff coil with a high speed alternator he had been developing as part of an improved arc lighting system but found that the high-frequency current overheated the iron core and melted the insulation between the primary and secondary windings in the coil. To fix this problem, Tesla came up with his "oscillating transformer", with an air gap instead of insulating material between the primary and secondary windings and an iron core that could be moved to different positions in or out of the coil. Later called the Tesla coil, it would be used to produce high-voltage, low-current, high frequency alternating-current electricity. He would use this resonant transformer circuit in his later wireless power work.

=== Wireless lighting ===
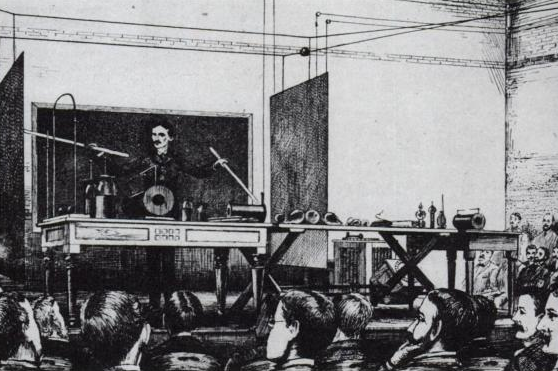
Tesla demonstrating wireless lighting by "electrostatic induction" during an 1891 lecture at Columbia College via two long Geissler tubes (similar to neon tubes) in his hands

After 1890, Tesla experimented with transmitting power by inductive and capacitive coupling using high AC voltages generated with his Tesla coil. He attempted to develop a wireless lighting system based on near-field inductive and capacitive coupling and conducted a series of public demonstrations where he lit Geissler tubes and even incandescent light bulbs from across a stage. He spent most of the decade working on variations of this new form of lighting with the help of various investors but none of the ventures succeeded in making a commercial product out of his findings.

In 1893 at St. Louis, Missouri, the Franklin Institute in Philadelphia, Pennsylvania and the National Electric Light Association, Tesla told onlookers that he was sure a system like his could eventually conduct "intelligible signals or perhaps even power to any distance without the use of wires" by conducting it through the Earth.

On 30 July 1891, aged 35, Tesla became a naturalized citizen of the United States. In the same year, he patented his Tesla coil. He served as a vice-president of the American Institute of Electrical Engineers from 1892 to 1894, the forerunner of the modern-day Institute of Electrical and Electronics Engineers (IEEE) (along with the Institute of Radio Engineers).

=== Polyphase system and the Columbian Exposition ===
A Westinghouse display of the "Tesla Polyphase System" at Chicago's 1893 Columbian Exposition

By the beginning of 1893, Westinghouse engineer Charles F. Scott and then Benjamin G. Lamme had made progress on an efficient version of Tesla's induction motor. Lamme found a way to make the polyphase system it would need compatible with older single-phase AC and DC systems by developing a rotary converter. Westinghouse Electric now had a way to provide electricity to all potential customers and started branding their polyphase AC system as the "Tesla Polyphase System". They believed that Tesla's patents gave them patent priority over other polyphase AC systems.

Westinghouse Electric asked Tesla to participate in the 1893 World's Columbian Exposition in Chicago where the company had a large space in the "Electricity Building" devoted to electrical exhibits. Westinghouse Electric won the bid to light the Exposition with alternating current and it was a key event in the history of AC power, as the company demonstrated to the American public the safety, reliability, and efficiency of an alternating current system that was polyphase and could also supply the other AC and DC exhibits at the fair.

A special exhibit space was set up to display various forms and models of Tesla's induction motor. The rotating magnetic field that drove them was explained through a series of demonstrations including an Egg of Columbus that used the two-phase coil found in an induction motor to spin a copper egg making it stand on end.

Tesla visited the fair for a week during its six-month run to attend the International Electrical Congress and put on a series of demonstrations at the Westinghouse exhibit. A specially darkened room had been set up where Tesla showed his wireless lighting system, using a demonstration he had previously performed throughout America and Europe; these included using high-voltage, high-frequency alternating current to light wireless gas-discharge lamps.

=== Steam-powered oscillating generator ===
During his presentation at the International Electrical Congress in the Columbian Exposition Agriculture Hall, Tesla introduced his steam-powered reciprocating electricity generator that he patented that year, something he thought was a better way to generate alternating current. Steam was forced into the oscillator and rushed out through a series of ports, pushing a piston up and down that was attached to an armature. The magnetic armature vibrated up and down at high speed, producing an alternating magnetic field. This induced alternating electric current in the wire coils located adjacent. It did away with the complicated parts of a steam engine/generator, but never caught on as a feasible engineering solution to generate electricity.

=== Consulting on Niagara ===
In 1893, Edward Dean Adams, who headed the Niagara Falls Cataract Construction Company, sought Tesla's opinion on what system would be best to transmit power generated at the falls. Over several years, there had been a series of proposals and open competitions on how best to do it. Among the systems proposed by several U.S. and European companies were two-phase and three-phase AC, high-voltage DC, and compressed air. Adams asked Tesla for information about the current state of all the competing systems. Tesla advised Adams that a two-phased system would be the most reliable and that there was a Westinghouse system to light incandescent bulbs using two-phase alternating current. The company awarded a contract to Westinghouse Electric for building a two-phase AC generating system at the Niagara Falls, based on Tesla's advice and Westinghouse's demonstration at the Columbian Exposition. At the same time, a further contract was awarded to General Electric to build the AC distribution system.

=== The Nikola Tesla Company ===
In 1895, Edward Dean Adams, impressed with what he saw when he toured Tesla's lab, agreed to help found the Nikola Tesla Company, set up to fund, develop, and market a variety of previous Tesla patents and inventions as well as new ones. Alfred Brown signed on, bringing along patents developed under Peck and Brown. The board was filled out with William Birch Rankine and Charles F. Coaney.

On 13 March 1895, the South Fifth Avenue building that housed Tesla's lab caught fire. It started in the basement of the building and was so intense Tesla's fourth-floor lab burned and collapsed into the second floor. The fire set back Tesla's ongoing projects, and destroyed a collection of early notes and research material, models, and demonstration pieces, including many that had been exhibited at the 1893 Worlds Colombian Exposition. Tesla told The New York Times "I am in too much grief to talk. What can I say?"

=== X-ray experimentation ===
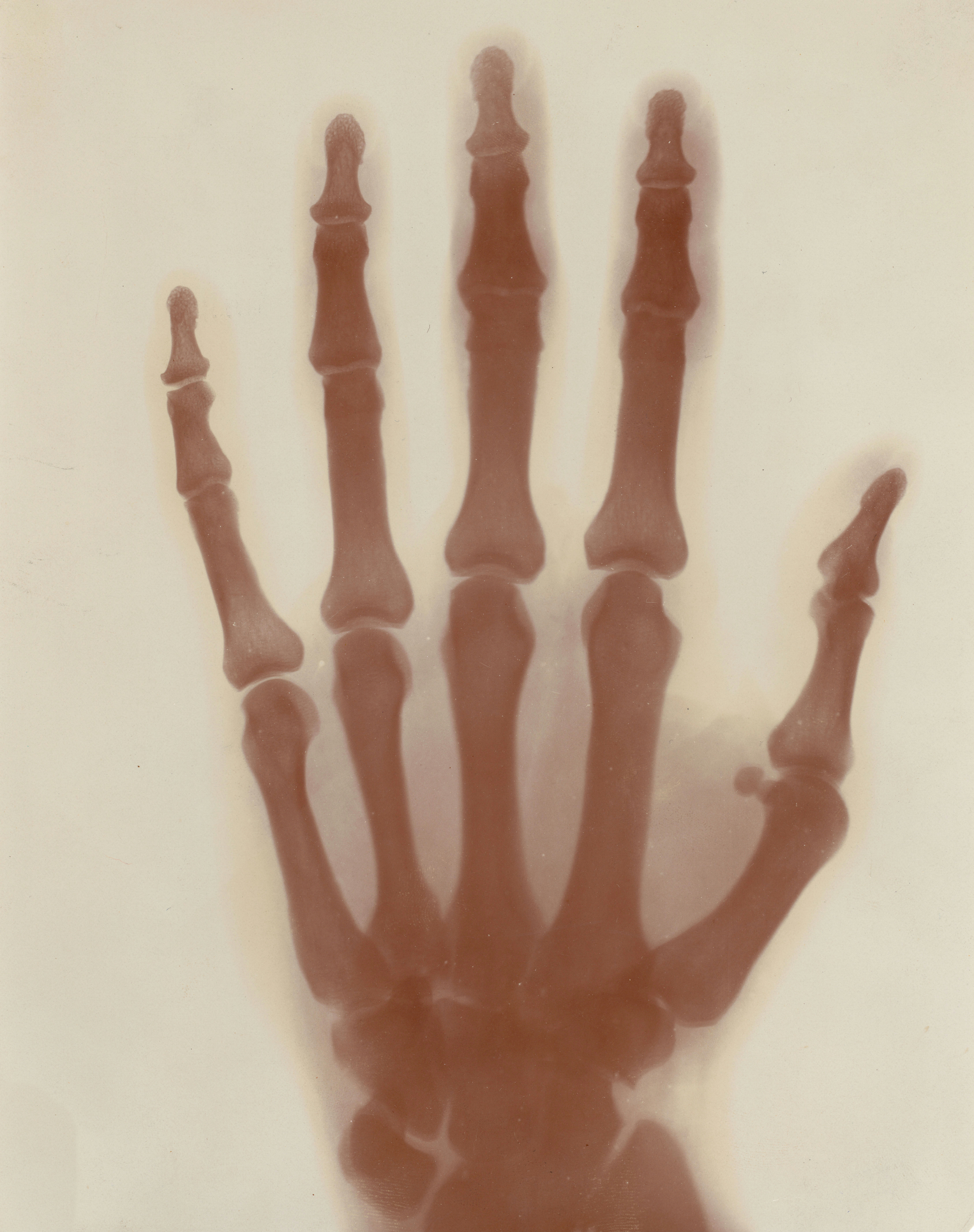
Tesla took this x-ray of his hand.

Starting in 1894, Tesla began investigating what he referred to as radiant energy of "invisible" kinds after he had noticed damaged film in his laboratory in previous experiments (later identified as "Roentgen rays" or "X-rays"). His early experiments were with Crookes tubes, a cold cathode electrical discharge tube. Tesla may have inadvertently captured an X-ray image—predating, by a few weeks, Wilhelm Röntgen's December 1895 announcement of the discovery of X-rays—when he tried to photograph Mark Twain illuminated by a Geissler tube, an earlier type of gas discharge tube. The only thing captured in the image was the metal locking screw on the camera lens.

In March 1896, Tesla conducted experiments in X-ray imaging, developing a high-energy single-terminal vacuum tube that had no target electrode and that worked from the output of the Tesla coil (the modern term for the phenomenon produced by this device is bremsstrahlung or braking radiation). In his research, Tesla devised several experimental setups to produce X-rays. Tesla held that, with his circuits, the "instrument will ... enable one to generate Roentgen rays of much greater power than obtainable with ordinary apparatus".

Tesla noted the hazards of working with his circuit and single-node X-ray-producing devices. In his many notes on the early investigation of this phenomenon, he attributed the skin damage to various causes. He believed early on that damage to the skin was not caused by the Roentgen rays, but by the ozone generated in contact with the skin, and to a lesser extent, by nitrous acid. Tesla incorrectly believed that X-rays were longitudinal waves, such as those produced in waves in plasmas. These plasma waves can occur in force-free magnetic fields.

=== Radio remote control ===
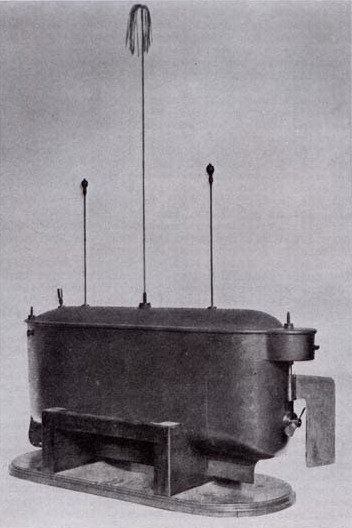
In 1898, Tesla demonstrated a radio-controlled boat, which he hoped to sell as a guided torpedo to navies around the world.

In 1898, Tesla demonstrated a boat that used a coherer-based radio control—which he dubbed "telautomaton"—to the public during an electrical exhibition at Madison Square Garden. Tesla tried to sell his idea to the U.S. military as a type of radio-controlled torpedo, but they showed little interest. Tesla took the opportunity to further demonstrate "Teleautomatics" in an address to a meeting of the Commercial Club in Chicago, while he was traveling to Colorado Springs, on 13 May 1899.

== Wireless power ==
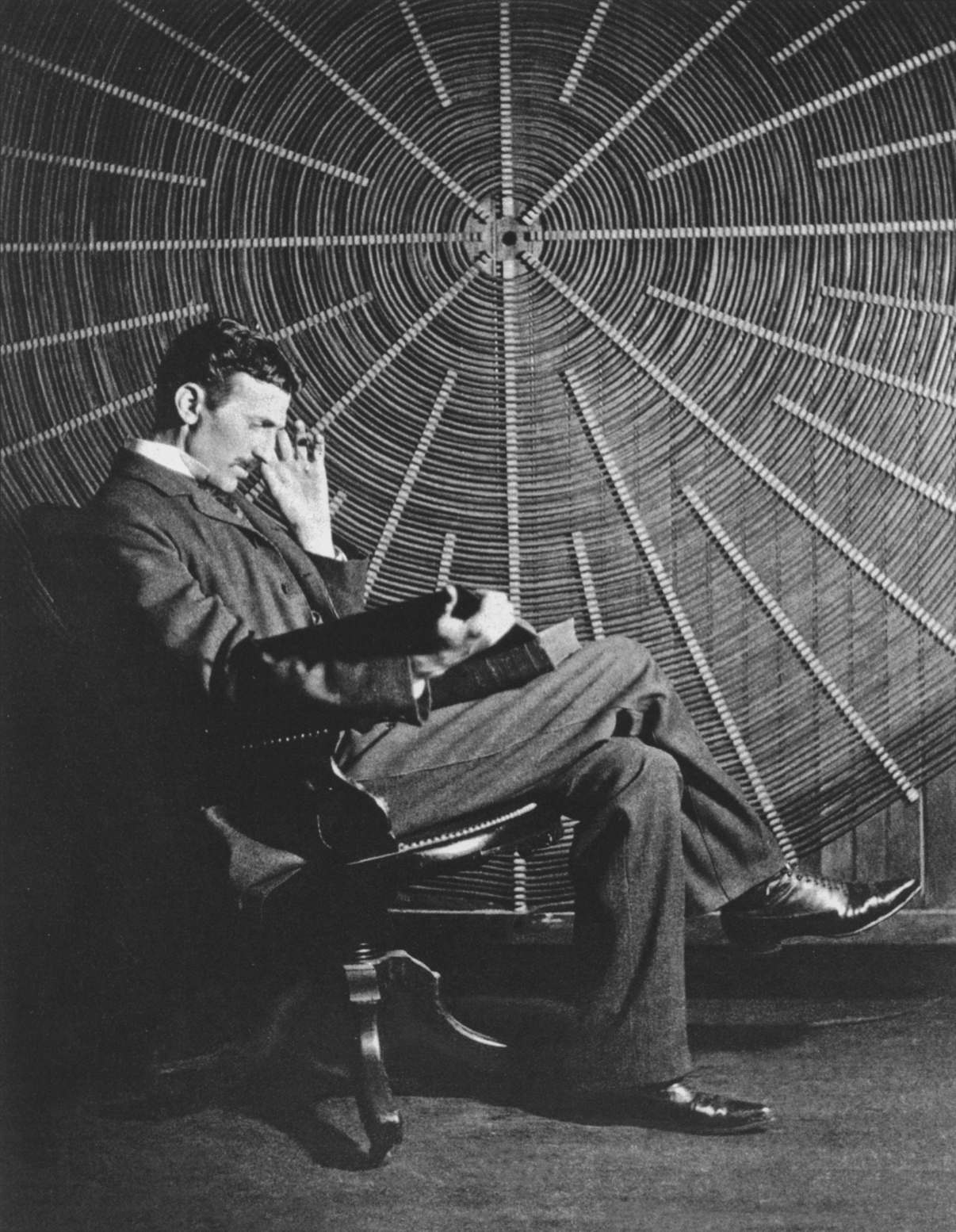
Tesla sitting in front of a spiral coil used in his wireless power experiments at his East Houston St. laboratory

From the 1890s through 1906, Tesla spent a great deal of his time and fortune on a series of projects trying to develop the transmission of electrical power without wires. At the time, there was no feasible way to wirelessly transmit communication signals over long distances, let alone large amounts of power. Tesla had studied radio waves early on, and came to the conclusion that part of the existing study on them, by Hertz, was incorrect. (Note: Tesla's own experiments led him to erroneously believe Hertz had misidentified a form of conduction instead of a new form of electromagnetic radiation, an incorrect assumption that Tesla held for a couple of decades.) Tesla noted that, even if theories on radio waves were true, they were worthless for his intended purposes, since this form of "invisible light" would diminish over a distance just like any other radiation and would travel in straight lines out into space, becoming "hopelessly lost". He worked on the idea that he might be able to conduct electricity long distance through the Earth or the atmosphere, and began working on experiments to test this idea including setting up a large resonance transformer magnifying transmitter in his East Houston Street lab.

=== Colorado Springs ===
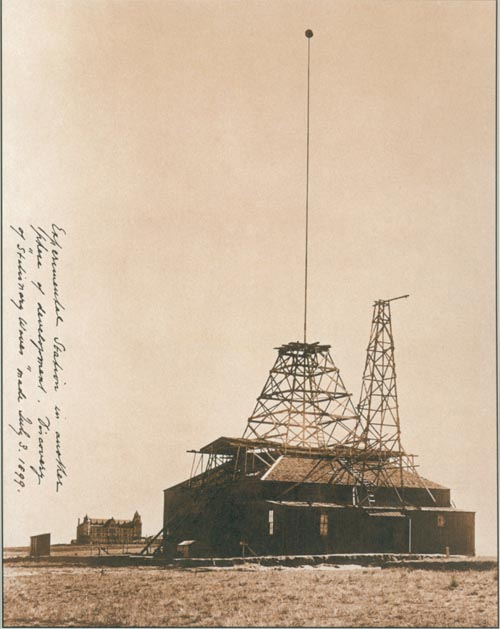
Tesla's Colorado Springs laboratory

To further study the conductive nature of low-pressure air, Tesla set up an experimental station at high altitude in Colorado Springs in 1899. There he could safely operate much larger coils than in his New York lab, and the El Paso Electric Light Company supplied alternating current free of charge. To fund his experiments, he convinced John Jacob Astor IV to invest $100,000 ($3,870,000 in today's dollars) to become a majority shareholder in the Nikola Tesla Company. Upon his arrival, he told reporters that he planned to conduct wireless telegraphy experiments, transmitting signals from Pikes Peak to Paris.

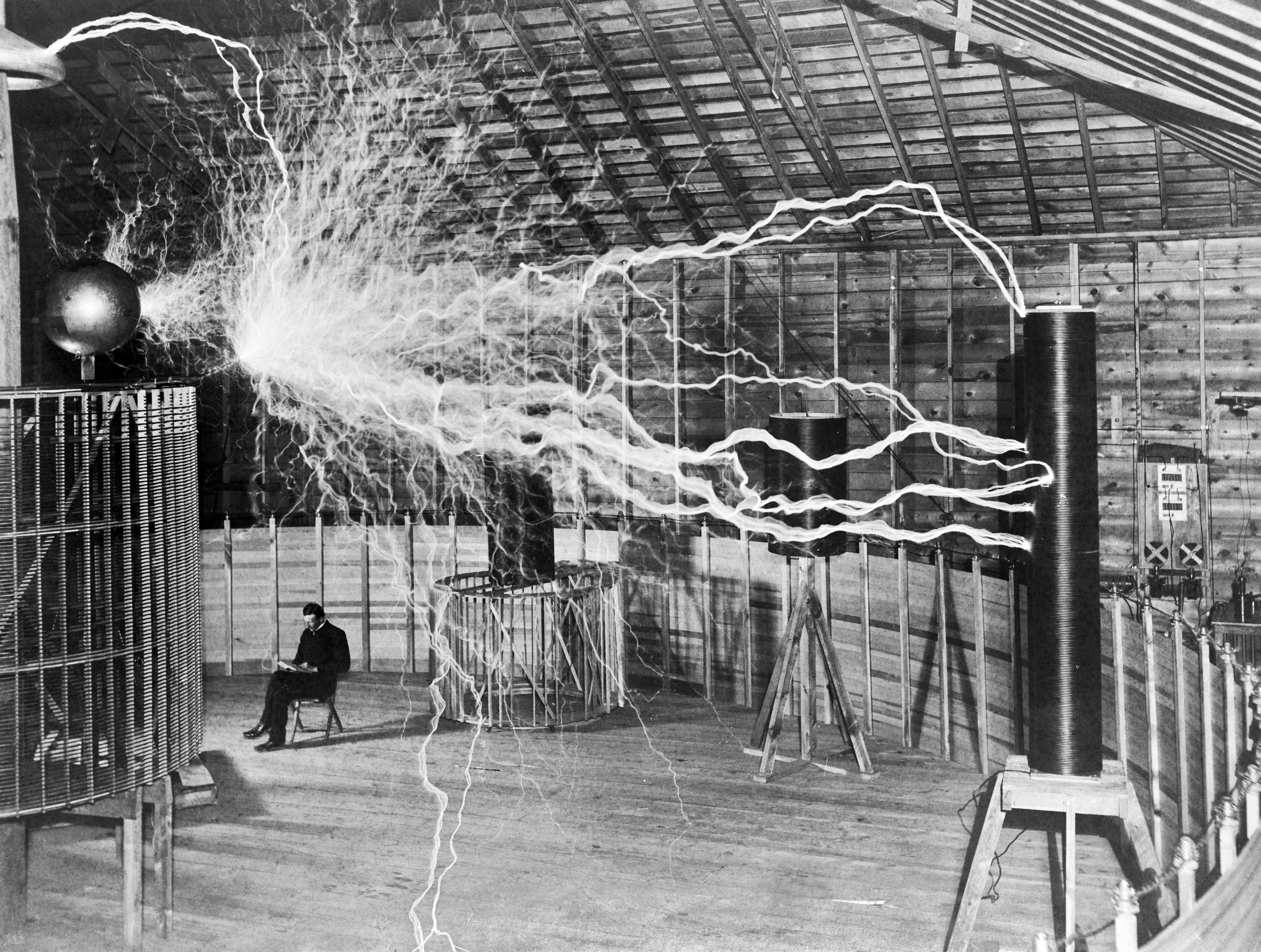
A multiple exposure picture of Tesla sitting next to his "magnifying transmitter" generating millions of volts. The 7-metre (23 ft) long arcs were not part of the normal operation, but only produced for effect by rapidly cycling the power switch.

There, he experimented with a large coil operating in the megavolts range, producing artificial lightning (and thunder) consisting of millions of volts and discharges of up to 135 feet (41 m) in length, and, at one point, inadvertently burned out the generator in El Paso, causing a power outage. The observations he made of the electronic noise of lightning strikes led him to (incorrectly) conclude that he could use the entire globe of the Earth to conduct electrical energy.

During his time at his laboratory, Tesla observed unusual signals from his receiver which he speculated to be communications from another planet. He mentioned them in a letter to a reporter in December 1899 and to the Red Cross Society in December 1900. Reporters treated it as a sensational story and jumped to the conclusion Tesla was hearing signals from Mars. He expanded on the signals he heard in a 9 February 1901 Collier's Weekly article entitled "Talking With Planets", where he said it had not been immediately apparent to him that he was hearing "intelligently controlled signals" and that the signals could have come from Mars, Venus, or other planets.

Tesla had an agreement with the editor of The Century Magazine to produce an article on his findings. The magazine sent a photographer to Colorado to photograph the work being done there. The article, titled "The Problem of Increasing Human Energy", appeared in the June 1900 edition of the magazine. He explained the superiority of the wireless system he envisioned, but the article was more of a lengthy philosophical treatise than an understandable scientific description of his work.

=== Wardenclyffe ===
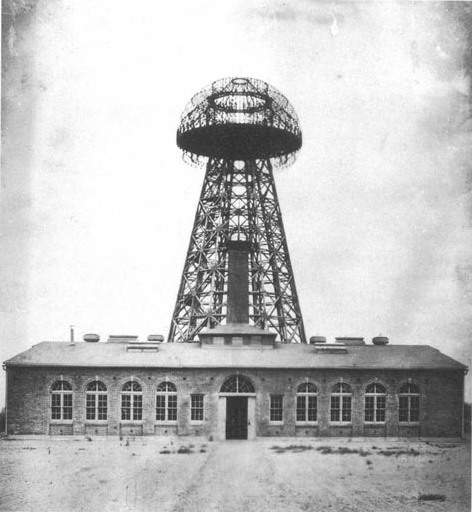
Tesla's Wardenclyffe plant on Long Island in 1904. From this facility, Tesla hoped to demonstrate wireless transmission of electrical energy across the Atlantic.

Tesla made the rounds in New York trying to find investors for what he thought would be a viable system of wireless transmission, wining and dining them at the Waldorf-Astoria's Palm Garden (the hotel where he was living at the time), The Players Club, and Delmonico's. In March 1901, he obtained $150,000 ($5,805,000 in today's dollars) from J. P. Morgan in return for a 51% share of any generated wireless patents, and began planning the Wardenclyffe Tower facility to be built in Shoreham, New York, 100 miles (161 km) east of the city on the North Shore of Long Island.

By July 1901, Tesla had expanded his plans to build a more powerful transmitter to leap ahead of Marconi's radio-based system, which Tesla thought was a copy of his own. In December 1901, Marconi transmitted the letter S from England to Newfoundland, defeating Tesla in the race to be first to complete such a transmission. In June 1902, Tesla moved his lab operations from Houston Street to Wardenclyffe.

Investors on Wall Street put money into Marconi's system, and some in the press began turning against Tesla's project, claiming it was a hoax. The project came to a halt in 1905. Tesla mortgaged the Wardenclyffe property to cover his debts at the Waldorf-Astoria, which eventually amounted to $20,000 ($642,900 in today's dollars).

== Later years ==
After Wardenclyffe closed, Tesla continued to write to Morgan; after "the great man" died, Tesla wrote to Morgan's son Jack, trying to get further funding for the project. In 1906, Tesla opened offices at 165 Broadway in Manhattan, trying to raise further funds by developing and marketing his patents. He went on to have offices at the Metropolitan Life Tower from 1910 to 1914; rented for a few months at the Woolworth Building, moving out because he could not afford the rent; and then to office space at 8 West 40th Street from 1915 to 1925. After moving to 8 West 40th Street, he was effectively bankrupt. Most of his patents had expired and he was having trouble with the new inventions he was trying to develop.

=== Bladeless turbine ===
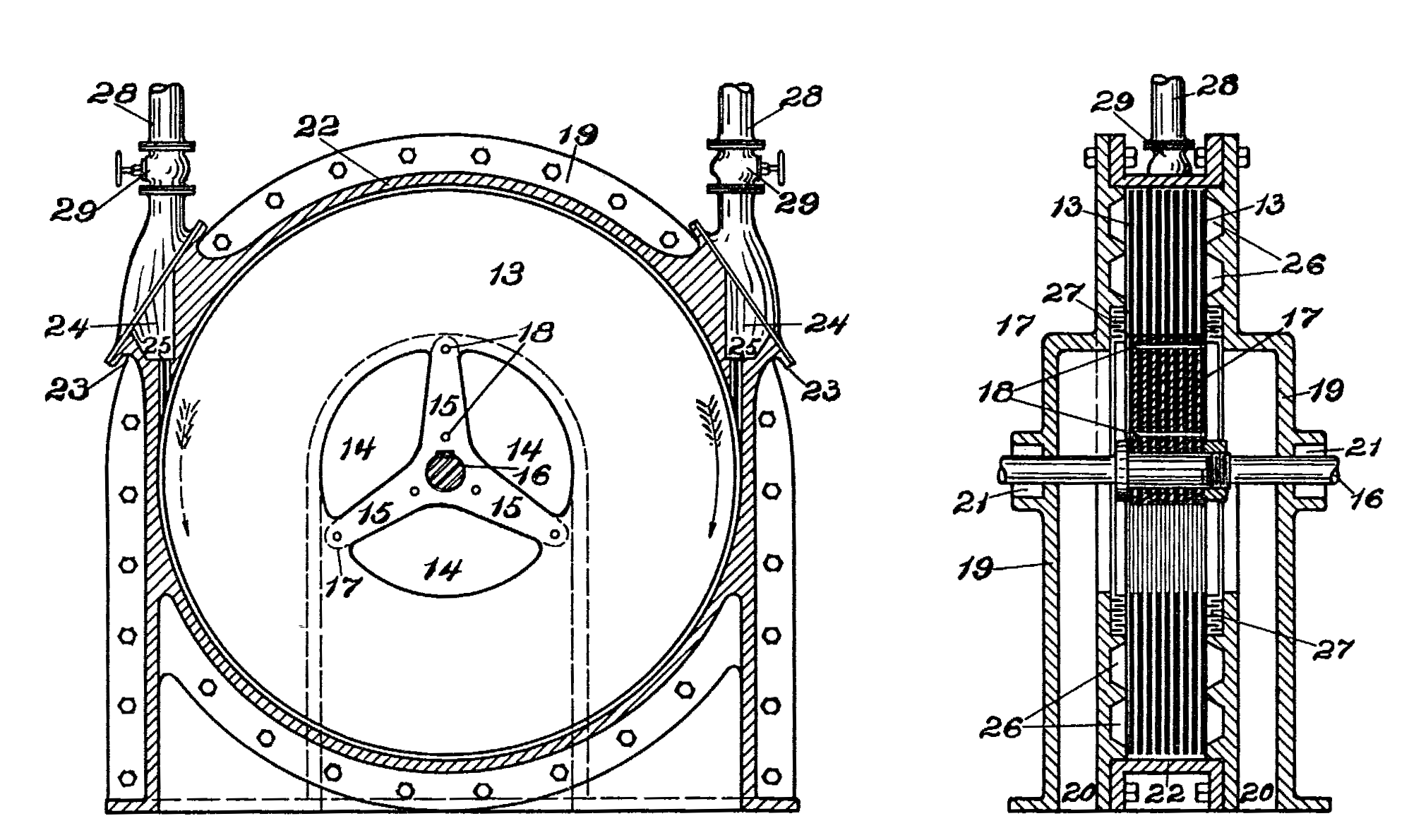
Tesla's bladeless turbine design

On his 50th birthday, in 1906, Tesla demonstrated a 200 horsepower (150 kilowatts) 16,000 rpm bladeless turbine. During 1910–1911, at the Waterside Power Station in New York, several of his bladeless turbine engines were tested at 100–5,000 hp. Tesla worked with several companies including from 1919 to 1922 in Milwaukee, for Allis-Chalmers. Tesla licensed the idea to a precision instrument company, and it found use in the form of luxury car speedometers and other instruments.

=== Wireless lawsuits ===
When World War I broke out, the British cut the transatlantic telegraph cable linking the U.S. to Germany in order to control the flow of information between the two countries. They also tried to shut off German wireless communication to and from the U.S. by having the U.S. Marconi Company sue the German radio company Telefunken for patent infringement. Telefunken brought in the physicists Jonathan Zenneck and Karl Ferdinand Braun for their defense, and hired Tesla as a witness for two years for $1,000 a month. The case stalled and then went moot when the U.S. entered the war against Germany in 1917.

In 1915, Tesla attempted to sue the Marconi Company for infringement of his wireless tuning patents. Marconi's initial radio patent had been awarded in the U.S. in 1897, but his 1900 patent submission covering improvements to radio transmission had been rejected several times on the grounds that it infringed on other existing patents, including two 1897 Tesla wireless power tuning patents, before it was finally approved in 1904. Tesla's 1915 case went nowhere, but in a related case, where the Marconi Company tried to sue the U.S. government over WWI patent infringements, a Supreme Court of the United States 1943 decision restored the prior patents of Oliver Lodge, John Stone, and Tesla. The court declared that their decision had no bearing on Marconi's claim as the first to achieve radio transmission, just that since Marconi's claim to certain patented improvements were questionable, the company could not claim infringement on those same patents.

=== Other ideas ===
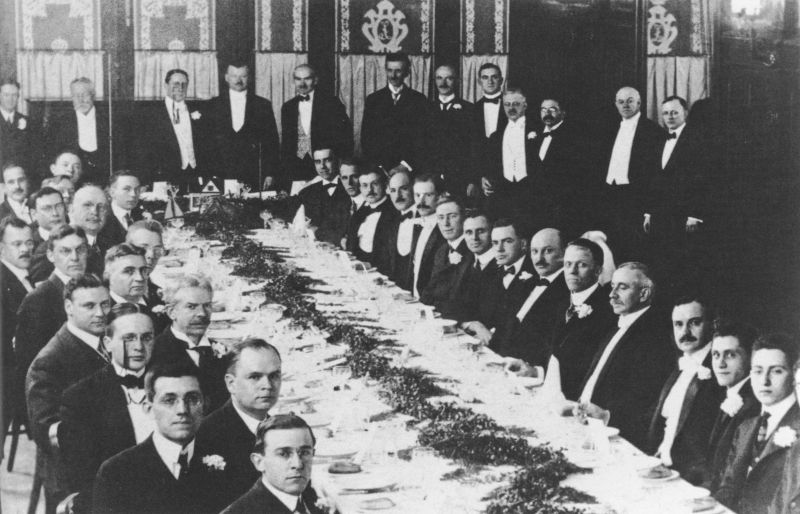
Second banquet meeting of the Institute of Radio Engineers, 23 April 1915. Tesla is seen standing in the center.

Tesla attempted to market several devices based on the production of ozone. These included his 1900 Tesla Ozone Company selling an 1896 patented device based on his Tesla coil, used to bubble ozone through different types of oil to make a therapeutic gel. He tried to develop a variation of this a few years later as a room sanitizer for hospitals.

He theorized that the application of electricity to the brain enhanced intelligence. In 1912, he crafted "a plan to make dull students bright by saturating them unconsciously with electricity", wiring the walls of a schoolroom and, "saturating [the schoolroom] with infinitesimal electric waves vibrating at high frequency. The whole room will thus, Mr. Tesla claims, be converted into a health-giving and stimulating electromagnetic field or 'bath.'" The plan was, at least provisionally, approved by then superintendent of New York City schools, William H. Maxwell.

In the August 1917 edition of the magazine The Electrical Experimenter, Tesla postulated that electricity could be used to locate submarines by using the reflection of an "electric ray" of "tremendous frequency", with the signal being viewed on a fluorescent screen (a system that has been noted to have a superficial resemblance to modern radar). Tesla was incorrect in his assumption that high-frequency radio waves would penetrate water. Émile Girardeau, who helped develop France's first radar system in the 1930s, noted in 1953 that Tesla's general speculation that a very strong high-frequency signal would be needed was correct. Girardeau said, "[Tesla] was prophesying or dreaming, since he had at his disposal no means of carrying them out, but one must add that if he was dreaming, at least he was dreaming correctly".

In 1928, Tesla received patent U.S. patent 1,655,114, for a biplane design capable of vertical take-off and landing (VTOL), which "gradually tilted through manipulation of the elevator devices" in flight until it was flying like a conventional plane. This impractical design was something Tesla thought would sell for less than $1,000.

=== Living circumstances ===
Tesla lived at the Waldorf Astoria Hotel in New York City from 1900 and ran up a large bill. He moved to the St. Regis Hotel in 1922 and followed a pattern from then on of moving to a different hotel every few years and leaving behind unpaid bills.

Tesla walked to the park every day to feed the pigeons. He began feeding them at the window of his hotel room and nursed injured birds back to health. He said that he had been visited by a certain injured white pigeon daily. He spent over $2,000 (equivalent to $38,470 in 2025) to care for the bird, including a device he built to support her comfortably while her broken wing and leg healed. Tesla's unpaid bills, as well as complaints about the mess made by pigeons, led to his eviction from St. Regis in 1923. He was forced to leave the Hotel Pennsylvania in 1930 and the Hotel Governor Clinton in 1934. At one point he took rooms at the Hotel Marguery. Tesla moved to the Hotel New Yorker in 1934. At this time, Westinghouse Electric & Manufacturing Company began paying him $125 (equivalent to $3,010 in 2025) per month in addition to paying his rent. Accounts of how this came about vary. Several sources claim that Westinghouse was concerned, or possibly warned, about potential bad publicity arising from the impoverished conditions in which their former star inventor was living. The payment has been described as being couched as a "consulting fee" to get around Tesla's aversion to accepting charity.

=== Birthday press conferences ===
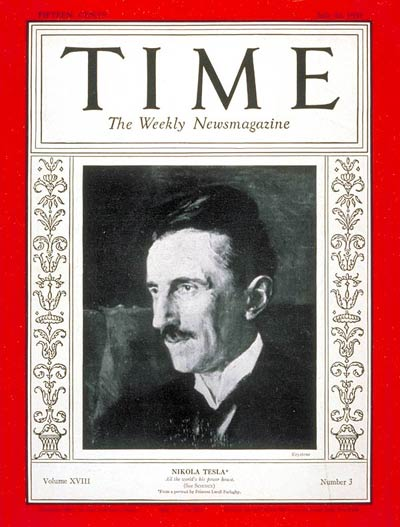
Photograph of Tesla on the cover of Time magazine, commemorating his 75th birthday in 1931

In 1931, a young journalist whom Tesla befriended, Kenneth M. Swezey, organized a celebration for the inventor's 75th birthday. Tesla received congratulations from figures in science and engineering such as Albert Einstein, and he was also featured on the cover of Time magazine. The cover caption "All the world's his power house" noted his contribution to electrical power generation. The party went so well that Tesla made it an annual event, an occasion where he would put out a large spread of food and drink—featuring dishes of his own creation. He invited the press in order to see his inventions and hear stories about his past exploits, views on current events, and sometimes baffling claims.

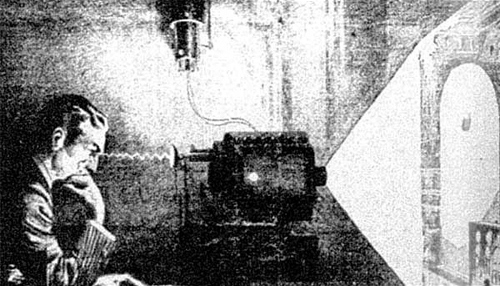
Newspaper representation of the thought camera Tesla described at his 1933 birthday party

At the 1932 party, Tesla claimed he had invented a motor that would run on cosmic rays. In 1933, at age 77, Tesla told reporters at the event that, after 35 years of work, he was on the verge of producing proof of a new form of energy. He claimed it was a theory of energy that was "violently opposed" to Einsteinian physics and could be tapped with an apparatus that would be cheap to run and last 500 years. He also told reporters he was working on a way to transmit individualized private radio wavelengths, working on breakthroughs in metallurgy, and developing a way to photograph the retina to record thought.

At the 1934 occasion, Tesla told reporters he had designed a superweapon he claimed would end all war. It was referred to as his death beam or death ray and papers cited Tesla's claims that it was a defensive weapon that would protect a country's border and could destroy an invading army 200 miles away and bring down a fleet of 10,000 enemy planes 250 miles away. Tesla used the name Teleforce at his 1940 birthday meeting but never revealed to the press of how the weapon worked. The US suspected Tesla planned to sell the weapon to the League of Nations and later, as threats of war increased, Tesla sent diagrams to the U.S. War Department, United Kingdom, Soviet Union, and Yugoslavia. Plans that surfaced at the Nikola Tesla Museum archive in Belgrade in 1984 described a device using a method of charging slugs of tungsten or mercury to millions of volts and directing them in streams (through electrostatic repulsion) through an array open-ended gas jet seal vacuum tubes.

In 1935, at his 79th birthday party, Tesla covered many topics. He claimed to have discovered the cosmic ray in 1896 and invented a way to produce direct current by induction, and made many claims about his mechanical oscillator. Describing the device (which he expected would earn him $100 million within two years) he told reporters that a version of his oscillator had caused an earthquake in his 46 East Houston Street lab and neighboring streets in Lower Manhattan in 1898. He went on to tell reporters his oscillator could destroy the Empire State Building with 5 pounds (2.3 kg) of air pressure. He also proposed using his oscillators to transmit vibrations into the ground. He claimed it would work over any distance and could be used for communication or locating underground mineral deposits, a technique he called "telegeodynamics".

In 1937, at his event in the Grand Ballroom of the Hotel New Yorker, Tesla received the Order of the White Lion from the Czechoslovak ambassador and a medal from the Yugoslav ambassador. On questions concerning the death ray, Tesla stated: "But it is not an experiment ... I have built, demonstrated and used it. Only a little time will pass before I can give it to the world."

== Awards ==
Tesla won numerous medals and awards. They include:

- Elliott Cresson Medal (Franklin Institute, 1894)
- Grand Cross of the Order of Prince Danilo I (Montenegro, 1895)
- Member of the American Philosophical Society (U.S., 1896)
- AIEE Edison Medal (Institute of Electrical and Electronics Engineers, U.S., 1916)
- Grand Cross of the Order of St. Sava (Yugoslavia, 1926)
- John Scott Medal (Franklin Institute & Philadelphia City Council, U.S., 1934)
- Order of the White Eagle (Yugoslavia, 1936)
- Grand Cross of the Order of the White Lion (Czechoslovakia, 1937)

== Death ==
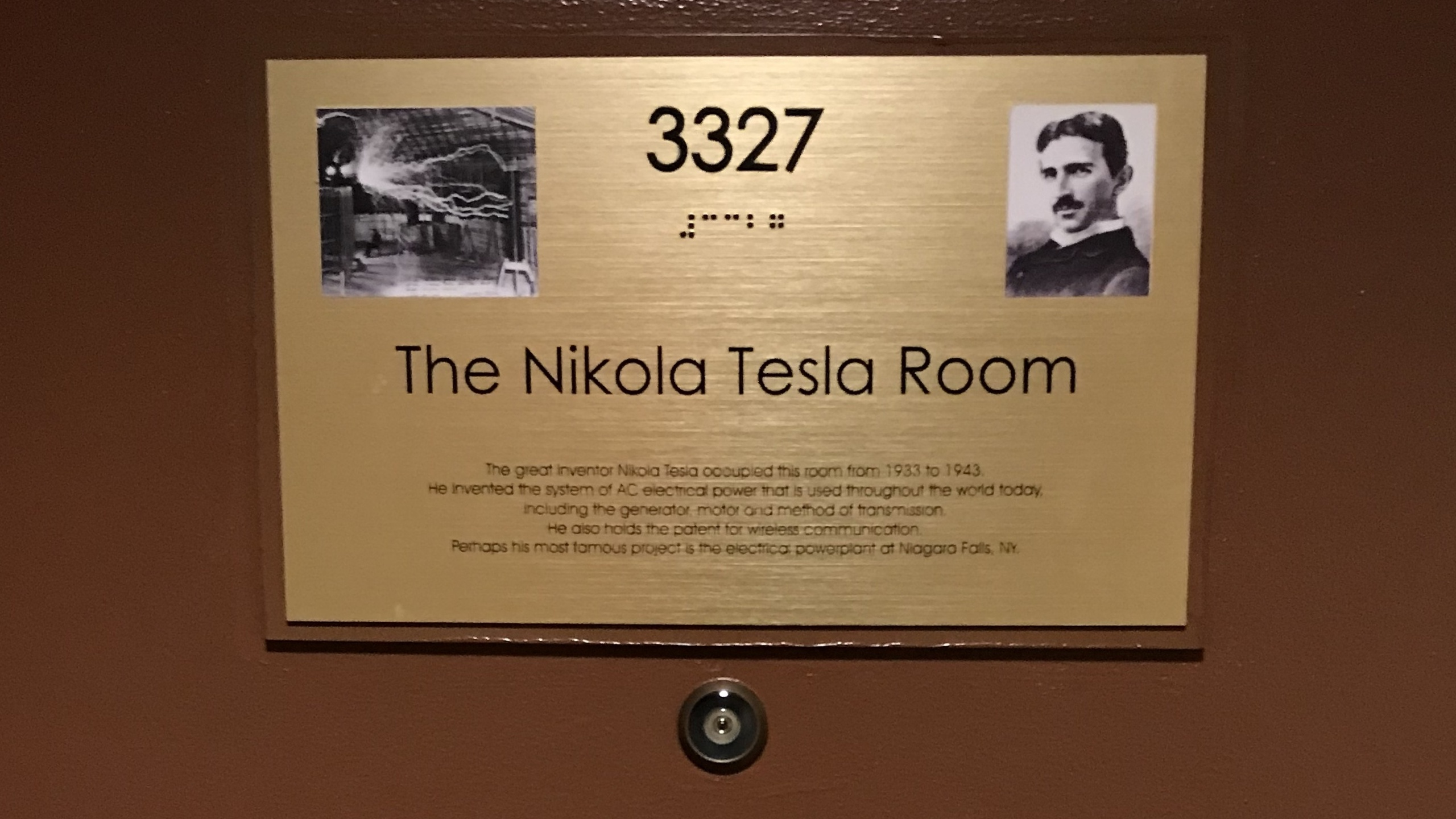
Room 3327 of the Hotel New Yorker, where Tesla died

In the fall of 1937 at the age of 81, after midnight one night, Tesla left the Hotel New Yorker to make his regular commute to St. Patrick's Cathedral and the Public Library to feed the pigeons. While crossing a street a couple of blocks from the hotel, Tesla was struck by a moving taxicab and was thrown to the ground. His back was severely wrenched and three of his ribs were broken. The full extent of his injuries was never known; Tesla refused to consult a doctor, an almost lifelong custom, and never fully recovered.

On the night of 7 January 1943, at the age of 86, Tesla died alone in his hotel room. His body was found by a maid on the next day when she entered his room, ignoring the "do not disturb" sign that had been placed on his door three days earlier. An assistant medical examiner examined the body, estimated the time of death as 10:30 p.m. and ruled that the cause of death had been coronary thrombosis.

Since this was during World War II, there were concerns raised in the U.S. government that Tesla's effects, including plans for a purported beam weapon, would go to his nephew Sava Kosanović, an exiled Yugoslav politician who could conceivably hand them over to enemies of the United States. With Kosanović being a non-U.S. citizen, the Federal Bureau of Investigation asked the Office of Alien Property Custodian to seize Tesla's belongings two days after his death. John G. Trump, an electrical engineering professor at MIT serving as a technical aide to the National Defense Research Committee, was called in to analyze the Tesla items. After a three-day investigation, Trump's report concluded that there was nothing which would "constitute a hazard in unfriendly hands." In a box purported to contain a part of Tesla's "death ray", Trump found a 45-year-old multidecade resistance box.

On 10 January 1943, New York City mayor Fiorello La Guardia read a eulogy for Tesla at his funeral at the Cathedral of St. John the Divine.

== Personal life and character ==
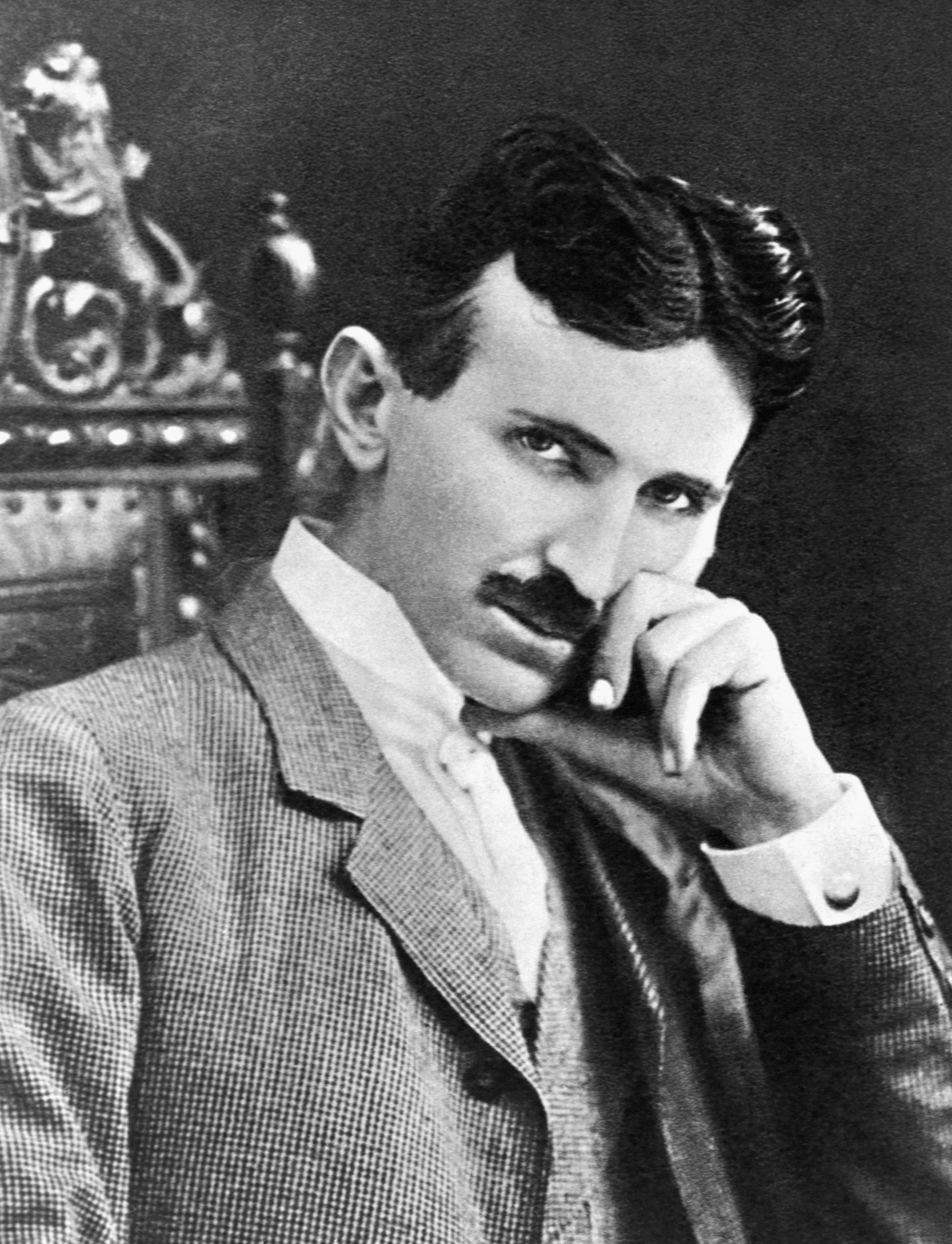
Tesla c. 1896

Tesla was a lifelong bachelor, who had once explained that his chastity was very helpful to his scientific abilities. In an interview with the Galveston Daily News on 10 August 1924 he stated, "Now the soft-voiced gentlewoman of my reverent worship has all but vanished. In her place has come the woman who thinks that her chief success in life lies in making herself as much as possible like man—in dress, voice and actions..." He told a reporter in later years that he sometimes felt that by not marrying, he had made too great a sacrifice to his work.

Tesla was a good friend of Francis Marion Crawford, Robert Underwood Johnson, Stanford White, Fritz Lowenstein, George Scherff, and Kenneth Swezey. In middle age, Tesla became a close friend of Mark Twain; they spent a lot of time together in his lab and elsewhere. Twain notably described Tesla's induction motor invention as "the most valuable patent since the telephone". At a party thrown by actress Sarah Bernhardt in 1896, Tesla met Indian Hindu monk Swami Vivekananda. Vivekananda later wrote that Tesla said he could demonstrate mathematically the relationship between matter and energy, something Vivekananda hoped would give a scientific foundation to Vedantic cosmology. The meeting with Swami Vivekananda stimulated Tesla's interest in Eastern Science, which led to Tesla studying Hindu and Vedic philosophy for a number of years. Tesla later wrote an article titled "Man's Greatest Achievement" using Sanskrit terms akasha and prana to describe the relationship between matter and energy. In the late 1920s, Tesla befriended George Sylvester Viereck, a poet, writer, mystic, and later a Nazi propagandist. Tesla occasionally attended dinner parties held by Viereck and his wife.

Tesla could be harsh at times and openly expressed disgust for overweight people, such as when he fired a secretary because of her weight. He was quick to criticize clothing; on several occasions, Tesla directed a subordinate to go home and change her dress. When Thomas Edison died in 1931, Tesla contributed the only negative opinion to The New York Times. He became a vegetarian in his later years, living on only milk, bread, honey, and vegetable juices.

== Views and beliefs ==
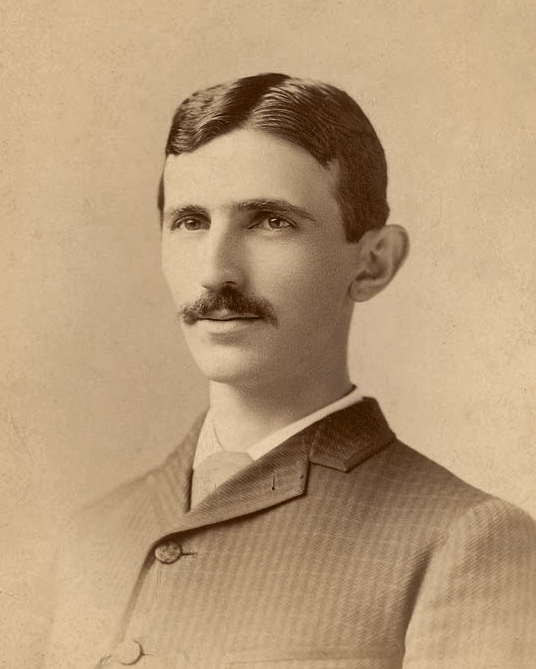
Tesla c. 1885

=== On society ===
Tesla is widely considered by his biographers to have been a humanist in philosophical outlook. He expressed the belief that human "pity" had come to interfere with the natural "ruthless workings of nature". Though his argumentation did not depend on a concept of a "master race" or the inherent superiority of one person over another, he advocated for eugenics. In 1926, Tesla commented on the ills of the social subservience of women and the struggle of women for gender equality. He indicated that humanity's future would be run by "Queen Bees". He believed that women would become the dominant sex in the future. He made predictions about the relevant issues of a post-World War I environment in an article entitled "Science and Discovery are the great Forces which will lead to the Consummation of the War" (20 December 1914).

=== On religion ===
Tesla was raised in the faith of the Eastern Orthodox Church. Later in life he did not consider himself to be a "believer in the orthodox sense", said he opposed religious fanaticism, and said "Buddhism and Christianity are the greatest religions both in number of disciples and in importance." He also said "To me, the universe is simply a great machine which never came into being and never will end" and "what we call 'soul' or 'spirit,' is nothing more than the sum of the functionings of the body. When this functioning ceases, the 'soul' or the 'spirit' ceases likewise."

== Literary works ==
Tesla wrote a number of books and articles for magazines and journals. Among his books are My Inventions: The Autobiography of Nikola Tesla, compiled and edited by Ben Johnston in 1983 from a series of 1919 magazine articles by Tesla which were republished in 1977; and The Tesla Papers. Many of his writings are freely available online, including the article "The Problem of Increasing Human Energy", published in The Century Magazine in 1900, and the article "Experiments with Alternate Currents of High Potential and High Frequency", published in his book Inventions, Researches and Writings of Nikola Tesla.

== Legacy ==
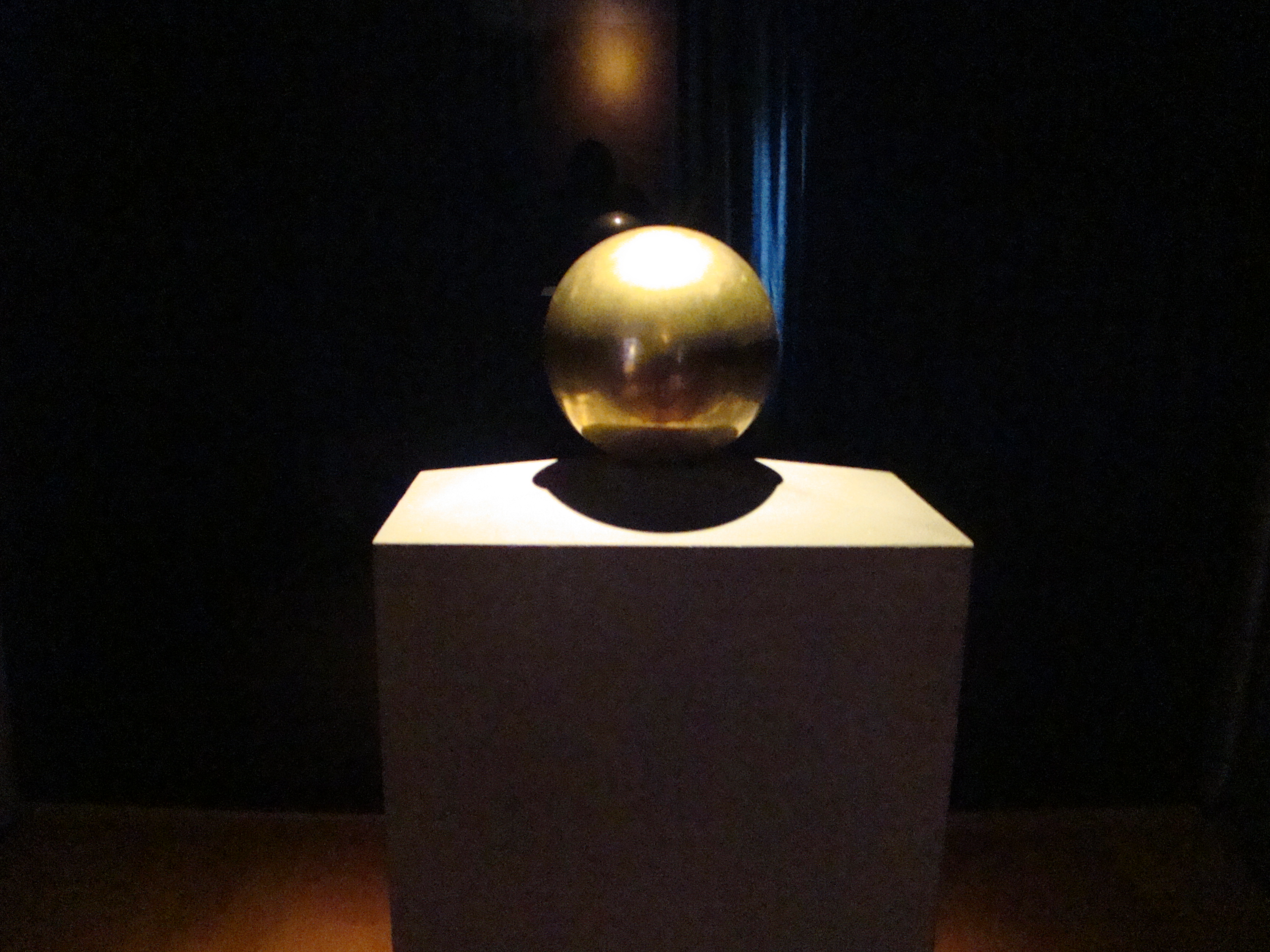
Gilded urn with Tesla's ashes, in his favorite geometric object, a sphere (Nikola Tesla Museum, Belgrade)

In 1952, following pressure from Sava Kosanović, Tesla's entire estate was shipped to Belgrade in 80 trunks marked "N.T.". In 1957, Kosanović's secretary Charlotte Muzar transported Tesla's ashes from the United States to Belgrade. They are displayed in a gold-plated sphere on a marble pedestal in the Nikola Tesla Museum. His archive consists of over 160,000 documents and is included in the UNESCO Memory of the World Programme.

Tesla obtained around 300 patents worldwide for his inventions. Some of Tesla's patents are not accounted for, and some that have lain hidden in patent archives have been rediscovered. There are at least 278 known patents issued to Tesla in 26 countries. Many were in the United States, Britain, and Canada, but many others were approved in countries around the globe.

== See also ==
- Atmospheric electricity – Electricity in planetary atmospheres
- Michael Faraday – English chemist and physicist (1791–1867)
- Charles Proteus Steinmetz – American mathematician and electrical engineer (1865–1923)
- Telluric current – Natural electric current in the Earth's crust
