= Kenneth M. Swezey =

American journalist a science writer born in 1904

- Born: June 11, 1904; Brooklyn, New York
- Died: February 25, 1972 (aged 67)
- Occupation: Science writer
- Known for: Science articles and books
- Parents: Edwin Lewis Swezey (father); Carrie F. Swezey, née Smith (mother)

Kenneth Malcolm Swezey (1904–1972) was an American science writer and journalist in New York City. He is best remembered for his association with and strong advocacy for Nikola Tesla, regularly publicizing Tesla's work in the press and books, and contributing to the creation of a Tesla Society to memorialize him. Swezey's collection of documents relating to Tesla, which he began as a teenager in 1920 and continued until his 1972 death, was given to the Smithsonian National Museum of American History.

== Biography ==
Kenneth Swezey was born in Brooklyn on 11 June 1904. His mother, Carrie, was 42 at the time and his father, Edwin L. Swezey, was 47. He had a sister, Martha, who was 13 years older and a sister, Anna, who was 25 years older. From early on he wrote about science and technology, selling his first article, on how to make a wet cell battery, at age 11. In his late teens he got a job writing a column on radio technology for the New York paper The Sun. He would go on to contribute articles as a freelance writer for various magazines such as The Experimenter, Boys' Life, and Popular Science (a reappearing series of "Home Experiments" articles). He would often illustrated his articles with photographs he shot himself. He lived with his parents up into his twenty's but by his thirty's he was living alone in a nearby residence on Milton Street in Brooklyn, New York. After World War II he wrote many books explaining scientific principles, sometimes equating them with everyday life and use in the home workshop. He died of a heart attack in 1972 at the age of 67.

== Association with Nikola Tesla ==
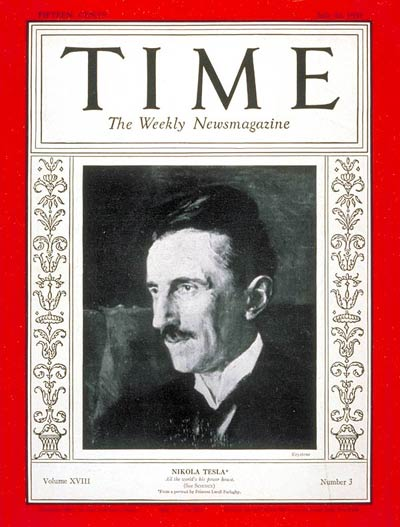
Tesla on Time magazine, a commemoration Swezey organized for the inventors 75th birthday

Swezey met Nikola Tesla in the 1920s (sources differ whether it was 1921, 1924, or 1929). Swezey thought the United States should honor Tesla and spent most of his life collecting the Serbian-American inventor's materials, writing about his inventions, and trying to memorialize him in other ways. This included organizing a celebration for the inventor's 75th birthday in 1931. The event included congratulatory letters from more than 70 pioneers in science and engineering, including Albert Einstein, and a feature on the cover of Time magazine. He is associated with a "Tesla Society" that organized a 100th anniversary celebration of Tesla's birth in 1956. He also lobbied for ships, schools, and a unit of measurement to be named after Tesla as well as the issuing of a commemorative stamp.

== Publications ==
- Author (book): Formulas, Methods, Tips and Data for Home and Workshop, 1969
- Author (book): Science Shows You How, exciting experiments that demonstrate basic principles, McGraw Hill, 1964 (a book aimed at teenagers)
- Author (book): More Science Magic, McGraw Hill, 1958
- Author (book): Chemistry Magic, 1956
- Author (book): Science Magic, McGraw-Hill , 1952
- Author (book): After Dinner Science, Wittlesey House, 1949
- Author: "Experiments with Tesla Resonator", The Experimenter, July 1925, p 625
