= Dušan Rakić =

Yugoslav and Serbian naval officer (1943–2020)

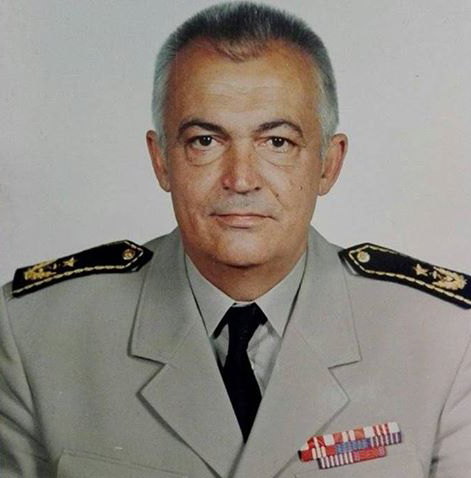
- Born: 12 September 1943; Belgrade, Yugoslavia
- Died: 15 July 2020 (aged 76); Belgrade, Serbia
- Military career
- Allegiance: Yugoslavia; FR Yugoslavia; Serbian Krajina
- Service years: –1994
- Rank: Captain (kbb) (JRM); Rear Admiral (SVK) (VJ)
- Units: Torpedo boat unit Pula garrison Pula naval sector
- Conflicts: Croatian War of Independence

Minister of Defence of Republic of Serbian Krajina
- In office 28 March 1993 – 21 April 1994
- Prime Minister: Đorđe Bjegović
- Preceded by: Stojan Španović
- Succeeded by: Rade Tanjga

Dušan Rakić (Serbian Cyrillic: Душан Ракић; 12 September 1943 – 15 July 2020) was a Yugoslav and Serbian naval officer who also served as the Minister of Defense of the unrecognized breakaway protostate Republic of Serbian Krajina during the Croatian War of Independence.

== Peacetime career ==
Rakić was born in Belgrade while his family roots are from Lika village Škare near the town of Otočac in Croatia. In 1987 he served in the rank of a frigate captain as a deputy commander of a torpedo boat unit of Yugoslav Navy under the commander, captain (kbb) Savo Jovović. Their unit was decorated as Yugoslav Navy's best unit in that year.

== Breakup of Yugoslavia ==
On August 3, 1991, now in the rank of Yugoslav Navy captain, he took over the post of the chief of staff of Pula naval garrison from Marko Kimer. Rakić served under Rear Admiral Vladimir Barović, who took over the command of the naval sector Pula at the same time. On September 27, having protested the Yugoslav military plans to wage war on Croatia, Barović was relieved of duty and replaced by Rakić. RA Barović committed suicide on the island of Vis the following day, writing in his suicide note that it was an act of honor, as he was not willing to take part in the war.

Rakić negotiated the withdrawal of Yugoslav forces and the takeover of military installations in Istria and Pula with Croatian authorities and police. Rakić oversaw the withdrawal of men, materiel, weapons and equipment from Pula to Boka Kotorska by naval vessels or by air from early October. This was completed in mid-December. Rakić left for Boka as well, his command - Yugoslav Navy's Naval Sector Pula (vojnopomorski sektor) ceased to exist, and he joined the Federal Yugoslavian Navy.

In 1992 he served as a chief of Navy Staff of FRY in Kumbor and an assistant for Navy to the Chief of FRY General Staff. His background check was apparently discussed in a session of FRY Supreme Defense Council on December 9, 1992, where the chief of staff general Života Panić commented that his wife and sons remained in Split, Croatia, and his two sons have apparently even joined the Croatian Army.

=== Minister of Defence of Krajina ===
Between late 1993 and late April 1994, Rakić, now in the rank of rear admiral, served as the Minister of Defense of the unrecognized breakaway Republic of Serbian Krajina in the cabinet of Prime Minister Bjegović. RAdm Rakić tried to reorganize the ministry and Krajina armed forces during the largely peaceful time period, as there were no major clashes with the Croatian military. However, political clashes of various factions, the breakaway state's catastrophic economy plagued with shortages and mass pessimism in the fourth war year prevented any positive change. As defence minister, Rakić declined the responsibility for mobilization being transferred from the army units back to the ministry, claiming it is not capable of that.

In that capacity on March 29, 1994, as the head of Krajina delegation, Rakić signed the Zagreb Ceasefire Agreement (hr) in the name of Krajina authorities, countersigned by Hrvoje Šarinić for Croatia. This foresaw creating and defining a buffer zone between the two opposing sides and some minor territory was exchanged, most notably on Velebit and Ravni kotari.

==== Dismissal ====
On the 18th session of FRY Supreme Defense Council on February 7, 1994, Slobodan Milošević and Momir Bulatović discussed Rakić's position, revealing that FRY appointed him, as an active-duty FRY military officer, to a ministerial post in Krajina government. This happened after they requested Belgrade to send them someone competent for that post, with the rank of a general. However, by February 1994 Krajina leadership, amidst bitter infighting and jockeying for control and posts, had grown cold towards Rakić and asked Belgrade for someone to replace him, which frustrated Milošević and Bulatović. Bulatović and Milošević were worried about the foreign attention his dual service - in FRY military and RSK military at the same time - could attract, thus explicitly revealing Belgrade's active role in the war in Croatia. They pointed out that their appointment of Rakić has already caused them significant PR damage in the face of international community. FRY Supreme Defense Council was thus not willing to bring pleading Rakić back to serve in the FRY military, with Milošević calling this rejection "a necessary sacrifice [of his career]". Rakić was replaced at the post of assistant to the chief of FRY General Staff by Rear Admiral Milan Zec. After Bjegović's Krajina cabinet was ousted in April 1994, Rakić was dismissed as a minister.

FRY Supreme Defense Council in June 1994 discussed his case and career at length, where several high-profile participants commented on his vices and alcoholism as another reason he was ousted from his Krajina office. They also mentioned his energy, sense of responsibility, but also his radical political views and insolence, lack of diplomatic behaviour as his main traits. After briefly toying with the idea of appointing him to a duty in MoD or waiting till September 1994 to appoint him as the commander of Yugoslav Navy, they decided against, supporting the proposal to send him into the retirement.

== Retirement ==
Rakić spent some time in 2017 in Mladenovac, where in November he pleaded with Dveri MPs to help him regulate his retirement / disability pension and status, to which they responded with a visit. He died in Belgrade.

Military offices
Preceded by Stojan Španović	Minister of Defense of Republic of Serbian Krajina; 1993–1994	Succeeded by Rade Tanjga
Preceded by	Assistant to the Chief of the General Staff (Yugoslavia) for Navy; 1992–1994	Succeeded by Milan Zec
