= Krunić =

Krunić (Serbian Cyrillic: Крунић) is a Serbo-Croatian surname. Notable people with the surname include:

- Aleksandra Krunić (born 1993), Serbian tennis player
- Boško Krunić (1929 – 2017), Yugoslavian Communist political figure
- Branislav Krunić (born 1979), former Bosnian Serb football player
- Predrag Krunić (born 1967), Bosnia and Herzegovina professional basketball coach
- Rade Krunić (born 1993), Bosnian footballer
- Simo Krunić (born 1967), Serbian football manager and former player
- Uroš Krunić (born 1994), Serbian footballer
