= Sekula =

Sekula or Sekuła is a surname and given name. Notable people with the surname include:

== People ==
=== Sekula ===
As a surname

- Allan Sekula (born 1951), American photographer and writer
- John Sekula (1969–2010), American guitarist
- Shelley Sekula-Gibbs (born 1952), American politician
- Sonja Sekula (1918–1963), American abstract expressionist artist

As a given name

- Sekula Drljević (1884–1945), Montenegrin WWII Nazi-fascist collaborator

=== Sekuła ===
- Andrzej Sekuła (born 1954), Polish cinematographer
- Ireneusz Sekuła (1943–2000), Polish politician
- Joanna Sekuła (born 1961), Polish politician
- Małgorzata Sekuła-Szmajdzińska (born 1956), Polish politician
- Mirosław Sekuła (born 1955), Polish politician
- Wojciech Sekuła (born 1982), Polish slalom canoeist
