= Tubić =

Tubić or Tubic is a surname. Notable people with the surname include:

- Dušan Tubić (born 1957), Serbian politician
- Hazel Tubic (born 1990), New Zealand rugby union player
- Miloš Tubić (born 1975), Serbian politician
- Nemanja Tubić (born 1984), Serbian footballer
- Siniša Tubić (born 1960), Bosnian bobsledder
