= Isidora Sekulić =

Serbian writer (1877–1958)

Isidora Sekulić Исидора Секулић
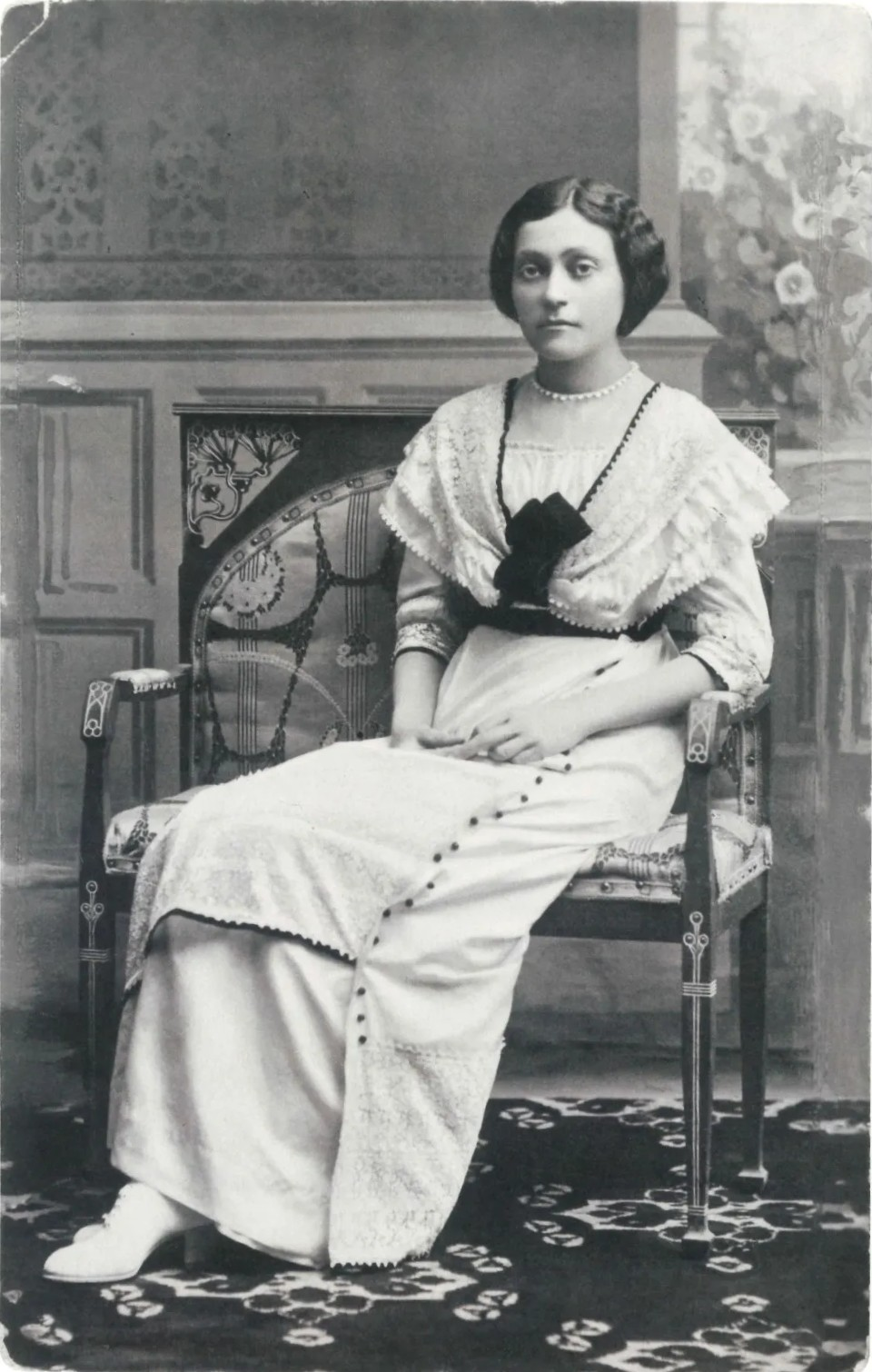
- Born: 16 February 1877; Mošorin, Austria-Hungary (modern-day Serbia)
- Died: 5 April 1958 (aged 81); Belgrade, PR Serbia, SFR Yugoslavia (modern-day Serbia)
- Occupations: writer, novelist, essayist, polyglot and art critic
- Writing career
- Language: Serbian

Isidora Sekulić (Serbian Cyrillic: Исидора Секулић, 16 February 1877 – 5 April 1958) was a Serbian writer, novelist, essayist, polyglot and art critic. She was the first woman academic in the history of Serbia, after she joined the Serbian Academy of Sciences and Arts in 1950.

== Biography ==
Sekulić was born in Mošorin, a village of Bács-Bodrog County, (now Serbia). In her early years she lived in various towns, including Ruma and Zemun, where she went to the gymnasium. She moved to Sombor to attend the Teachers' Academy (Preparandija), and completed her studies in Budapest in 1897. She worked as a teacher in Pančevo and Šabac for a few years after her graduation.

Apart from her studies in literature, Sekulić was also well versed in natural sciences as well as philosophy. In addition to graduating from the pedagogical school in Budapest, she obtained her doctorate in 1922 in Germany. Her travels included extended stays in England, France and Norway. Her travels from Oslo through Bergen to Finnmark resulted in Pisma iz Norveške / Letters from Norway meditative travelogue in 1914. Her collection of short stories, Saputnici, are unusually detailed and penetrating accomplishment in self-analysis and a brave stylistic experiment. She also spoke several classical as well as nine modern languages.

Sekulić's lyrical, meditative, introspective and analytical writings come at the dawn of Serbian prose writing. Sekulić is concerned with the human condition of man in his new, thoroughly modern sensibility. In her main novel, The Chronicle of a Small Town Cemetery (Кроника паланачког гробља), she writes in opposition to the usual chronological development of events. Instead, each part of the book begins in the cemetery, eventually returning to the time of bustling life, with all its joys and tragedies. Characters such as Gospa Nola, are the first strong female characters in Serbian literature, painted in detail in all their courage, pride and determination.

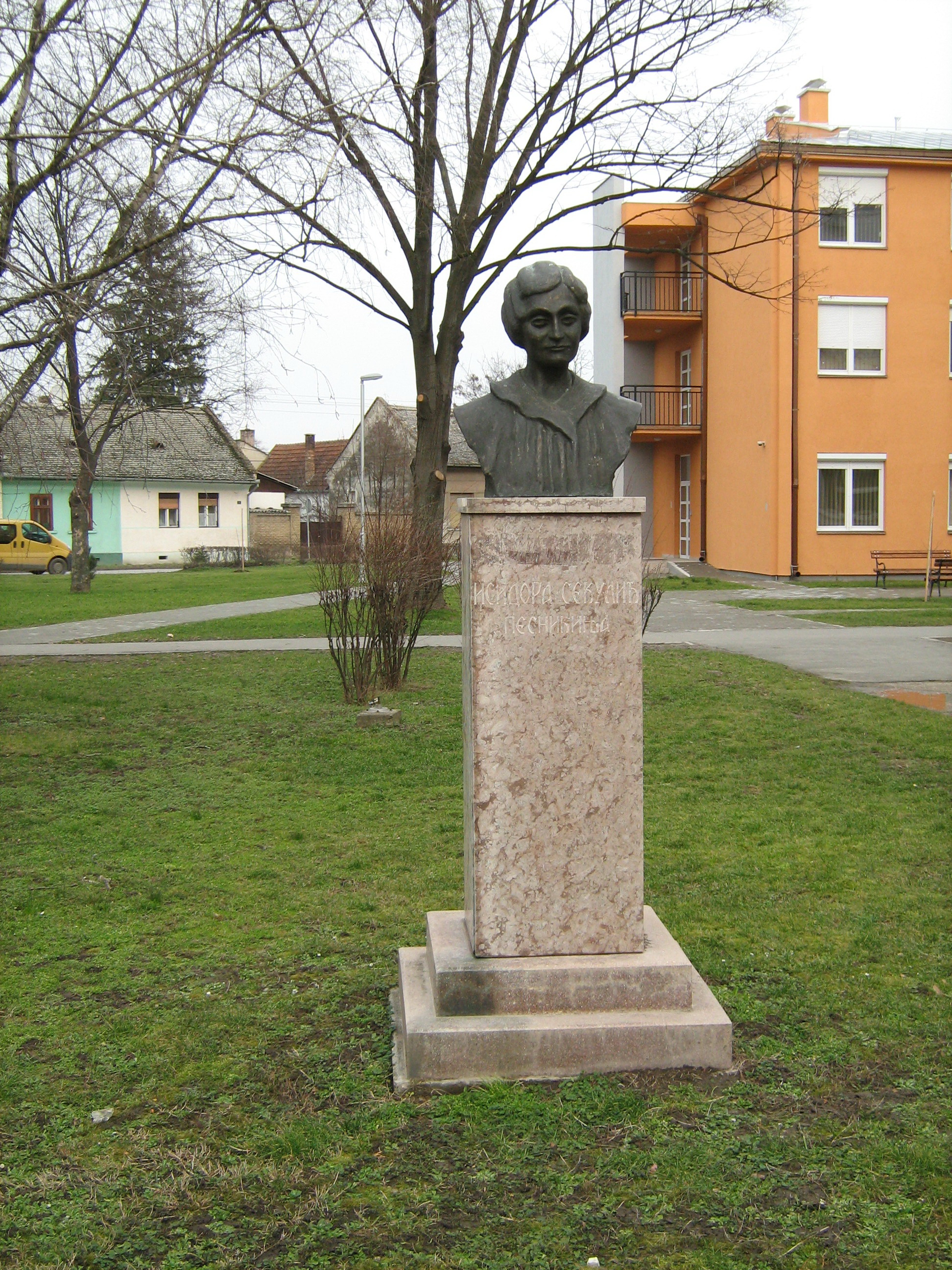
Bust of Sekulić in Sombor

Isidora Sekulić also wrote critical writings in the areas of music, theatre, art, architecture and literature and philosophy. She wrote major studies of Yugoslav, Russian, English, German, French, Italian, Norwegian and other literatures.

== Selected works ==
- Saputnici (1913)
- Pisma iz Norveške (1914)
- Iz prošlosti (1919)
- Đakon Bogorodičine crkve (1919)
- Kronika palanačkog groblja (1940)
- Zapisi (1941)
- Analitički trenuci i teme, 1-3 (1941)
- Zapisi o mome narodu (1948)
- Njegošu knjiga duboke odanosti (1951)
- Govor i jezik, kulturna smotra naroda (1956)

== Isidora Sekulić Award ==
Since 1968, the municipality of Savski venac endows the literary prize Isidora Sekulić Award annually, and presents it during the literary event "Dani Isidore Sekulić". The award honors contemporary authors for significant achievement in the field of literature and encourages their literary creativity in the sense of the work of Isidora Sekulić, who spent the last years of her life in a small house with garden on Topčider Hill.

== See also ==
- Jelena Dimitrijević
- Mir-Jam
