= Vladimir Barović =

Montenegrin rear admiral during the Yugoslav Wars

- Born: 7 November 1939; Banja Luka, Vrbas Banovina, Kingdom of Yugoslavia
- Died: 29 September 1991 (aged 51) Vis, SR Croatia, SFR Yugoslavia
- Allegiance: SFR Yugoslavia
- Branch: Yugoslav People's Army/ Yugoslav Navy
- Service years: 1960–1991
- Rank: Rear admiral

Vladimir Barović (7 November 1939 – 29 September 1991) was a Montenegrin rear admiral in the Yugoslav People's Army (JNA) who committed suicide after refusing an order to shell Croatian cities.

== Early life and education ==
Barović was born in Banja Luka on 7 November 1939 to a Montenegrin father, a JNA general and first war commander of Priština, and a Slovene mother. Shortly after his father was appointed to the position of war commander of Priština, he was dismissed because he opposed terror against Kosovo Albanians. Therefore, Barović's comrades wrote: "The old rule: From the good roots – each leaf is good."

== Military career ==
Barović become commander of the Military-Maritime sector of Pula after he was dismissed from the position of the commander of the Military-Maritime sector Bay of Kotor. As commander of the Pula garrison, he took part in negotiations on the withdrawal of JNA from Pula in early 1990s. He is remembered for his statement: "Any destruction won't be conducted here while I'm in command, and if I am still forced to order the destruction of Pula and Istria, then I will no longer be here."

The day after the dismissal from the position of the commander of the Military-Maritime sector of Pula, Barović was appointed deputy commander of the military district of Split, with the headquarters on the island of Vis. Barović took the position from the Admiral Mile Kandić. On 29 September 1991 Barović got an order from the JNA headquarters in Belgrade to start bombing towns in Dalmatia.

He was against the aggression of both the JNA and Montenegrin reservists against Croatia. According to him, it was in complete contrast to the Montenegrin and military honor. He refused to enforce the order.

That same evening, in the base ambulance building, Barović committed suicide. He left a suicide note in which he wrote, among other things, that he decided to die with dignity "because I do not want to wage war against the brotherly Croatian people", and that he did not want to "take part in the aggression of the JNA against Croats, which is for me an act contrary to the Montenegrin honor – because Montenegrins cannot fight and destroy the nation that did not do anything wrong to us."

Barović was buried in Herceg Novi.

On 13 July 2016 Montenegrin president Filip Vujanović posthumously decorated Barović with the Order for Bravery, which is awarded for "exceptional bravery and self-sacrifice expressed in extremely dangerous events in the saving of human lives and of material goods".

== Ranks ==
- Potporučnik (Second lieutenant) (1960)
- Ship-of-the-line captain (1982)
- Rear admiral (1990)

== See also ==
- Croatian War of Independence
