= My Inventions: The Autobiography of Nikola Tesla =

Book by Nikola Tesla

- First (1982) edition
- Author: Nikola Tesla; Ben Johnston
- Language: English
- Genre: Autobiography
- Publisher: Experimenter Publishing Company, Inc., New York, 1919 (Original serialized edition) Školska Knjiga, Zagreb, 1977 Hart Brothers, Williston, Vermont, 1982 (First edition)
- Publication date: 1919
- Publication place: United States
- Pages: 111
- ISBN: 978-1-61640-386-7 (Hard cover); ISBN 978-0-910077-00-2 (Paperback)

My Inventions: The Autobiography of Nikola Tesla is a book compiled and edited by Ben Johnston detailing the work of Nikola Tesla. The content was largely drawn from a series of articles that Nikola Tesla had written for Electrical Experimenter magazine in 1919, when he was 63 years old. Tesla's personal account is divided into six chapters covering different periods of his life: My Early Life, My First Efforts At Invention, My Later Endeavors, The Discovery of the Rotating Magnetic Field, The Discovery of the Tesla Coil and Transformer, The Magnifying Transmitter, and The Art of Telautomatics.

== Publication history ==
Tesla's autobiography was first published as a six-part 1919 series in the Electrical Experimenter magazine, in the February – June, and October issues. The series was republished as Moji Pronalasci – My Inventions, Školska Knjiga, Zagreb, 1977, on the occasion of Tesla's 120th anniversary, with side-by-side English and Serbo-Croatian translations by Tomo Bosanac and Vanja Aljinović, Branimira Valić, ed. It is presently available in book form, My Inventions : The Autobiography of Nikola Tesla, Hart Brothers, Williston, Vermont, 1982, Giovanni Herran. Figures with an 18-page introduction by Ben Johnston. Hugo Gernsback also wrote his own introduction to the series which was published in the January 1919 issue.

== The Strange Life of Nikola Tesla ==
The Strange Life of Nikola Tesla is the renamed Part One, The Life of Tesla by Tesla. The Strange Life of Nikola Tesla was published by Kolmogorov-Smirnov Publishing, and subsequently became the first online version of Nikola Tesla's Autobiography. It was transcribed by John Rolad Penner in 1994 from a small typed booklet, then photocopied and stapled. The booklet includes no means of contacting the publisher, although the name 'Kolmogorov-Smirnov Publishing' appears after the title page. The only form of date identification is the hand-written purchase date: April 29, 1978. The text was first made available on GEnie in 1995 under the GNU General Public License, and from there, soon began to propagate onto the Internet.

Although it is the first electronic version of Tesla's autobiography available online it contains many significant errors carried over from the original photocopied text. Online Internet scrutiny has subsequently revealed numerous omissions and additions that did not appear in the original serial text published in Electrical Experimenter magazine.

The original six-part series published in Electrical Experimenter Magazine in 1919 has been republished in book form as: My Inventions, The Autobiography of Nikola Tesla (Hart Brothers, Williston, 1983). A nearly unabridged version of My Inventions in various file formats is also freely available in electronic form at www.tfcbooks.com/special/mi_link.htm. It supersedes the earlier corrupted text.
