= History of the Tesla coil =

Electrical resonant transformer circuit

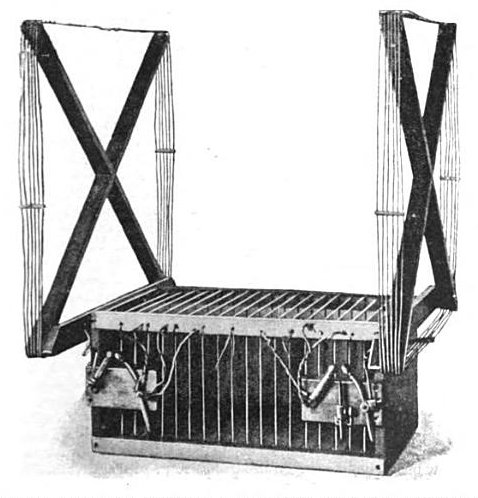
Henry Rowland's 1889 spark-excited resonant transformer, a predecessor to the Tesla coil.

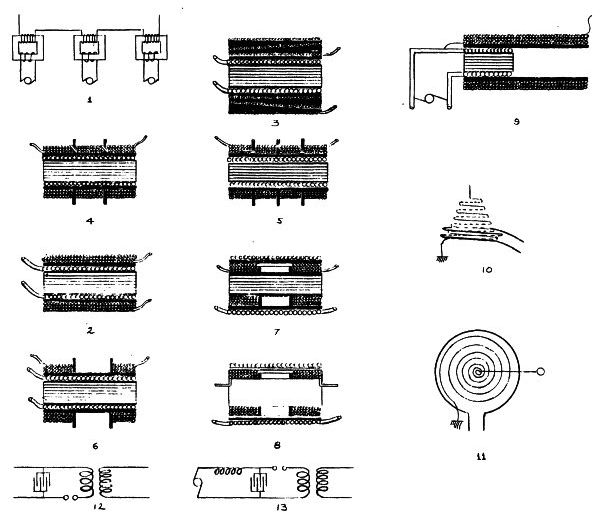
Steps in Tesla's development of the Tesla transformer around 1892. (1) Closed-core transformers used at low frequencies, (2-7) rearranging windings for lower losses, (8) removed iron core, (9) partial core, (10-11) final conical Tesla transformer, (12-13) Tesla coil circuits

Nikola Tesla patented the Tesla coil circuit on April 26, 1892. and first publicly demonstrated it May 20, 1892 in his lecture "Experiments with Alternate Currents of Very High Frequency and Their Application to Methods of Artificial Illumination" before the American Institute of Electrical Engineers at Columbia College, New York. Although Tesla patented many similar circuits during this period, this was the first that contained all the elements of the Tesla coil: high voltage primary transformer, capacitor, spark gap, and air core "oscillation transformer".

From Tesla's time until the 1930s Tesla coils were widely used in radio transmitters, quack electrotherapy, and experiments in wireless power transmission, and more recently in movies and show business.

== Invention ==
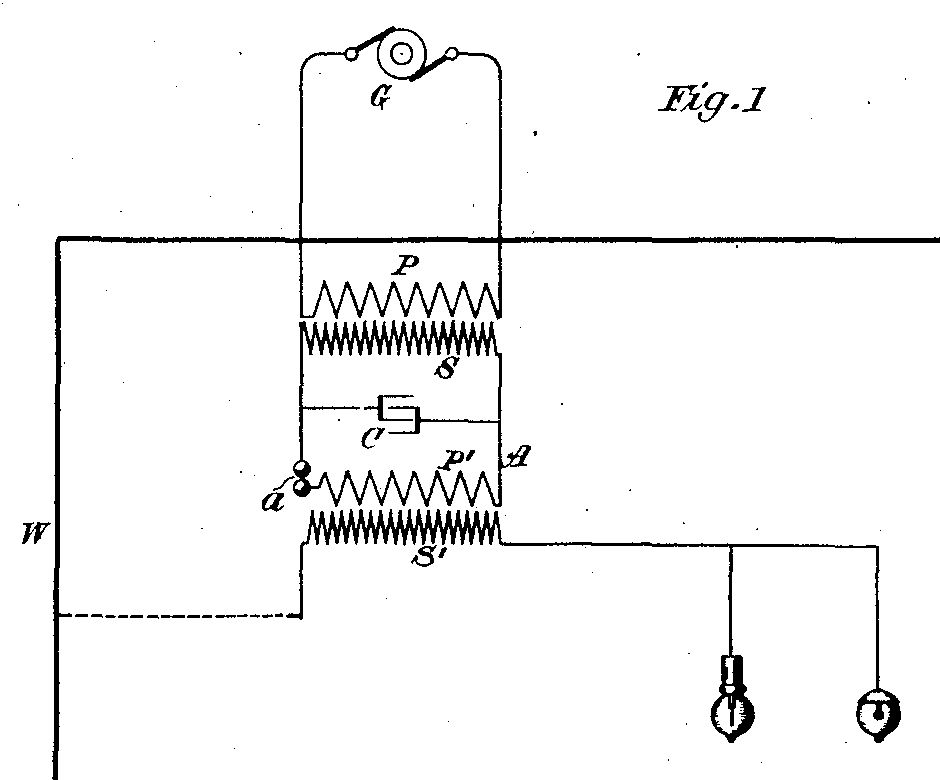
First drawing of Tesla coil circuit from Tesla's April 25, 1891 patent.

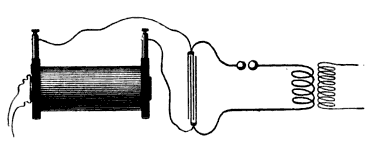
Drawing of Tesla coil circuit from Tesla's May 20, 1891 lecture at Columbia College, New York.

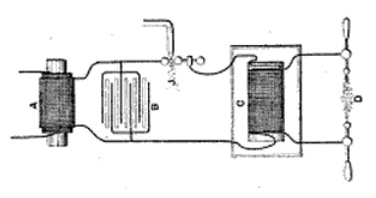
Elihu Thomson's Tesla coil, published February 1892, identical to Tesla's except for a compressed air spark blowout (J).

During the Industrial Revolution the electrical industry exploited direct current (DC) and low frequency alternating current (AC), but not much was known about frequencies above 20 kHz, what are now called radio frequencies. In 1887, four years previously, Heinrich Hertz had discovered Hertzian waves (radio waves), electromagnetic waves which oscillated at very high frequencies. This attracted much attention, and a number of researchers began experimenting with high frequency currents.

Tesla's background was in the new field of alternating current power systems, so he understood transformers and resonance. In 1888 he decided that high frequencies were the most promising field for research, and set up a laboratory at 33 South Fifth Avenue, New York for researching them, initially repeating Hertz's experiments.

He first developed alternators as sources of high frequency current, but by 1890 found they were limited to frequencies of about 20 kHz. In search of higher frequencies he turned to spark-excited resonant circuits. Tesla's innovation was in applying resonance to transformers. Transformers functioned differently at high frequencies than at the low frequencies used in power systems; the iron core in low frequency transformers caused energy losses due to eddy currents and hysteresis. Tesla and Elihu Thomson independently developed a new type of transformer without an iron core, the "oscillation transformer", and the Tesla coil circuit to drive it to produce high voltages.

Tesla invented the Tesla coil during efforts to develop a "wireless" lighting system, with gas discharge light bulbs that would glow in an oscillating electric field from a high voltage, high frequency power source. For a high frequency source Tesla powered a Ruhmkorff coil (induction coil) with his high frequency alternator. He found that the core losses due to the high frequency current overheated the iron core in the Ruhmkorff coil and melted the insulation between the primary and secondary windings. To fix this problem Tesla changed the design so that there was an air gap instead of insulating material between the windings, and made the iron core adjustable so it could be moved in or out of the coil He eventually found the highest voltages could be produced when the iron core was omitted. Tesla also found he needed to put the capacitor normally used in the Ruhmkorff circuit between his alternator and the coil's primary winding to avoid burning out the coil. By adjusting the coil and capacitor Tesla found he could take advantage of the resonance set up between the two to achieve even higher frequencies. He found that the highest voltages were generated when the "closed" primary circuit with the capacitor was in resonance with the "open" secondary winding.

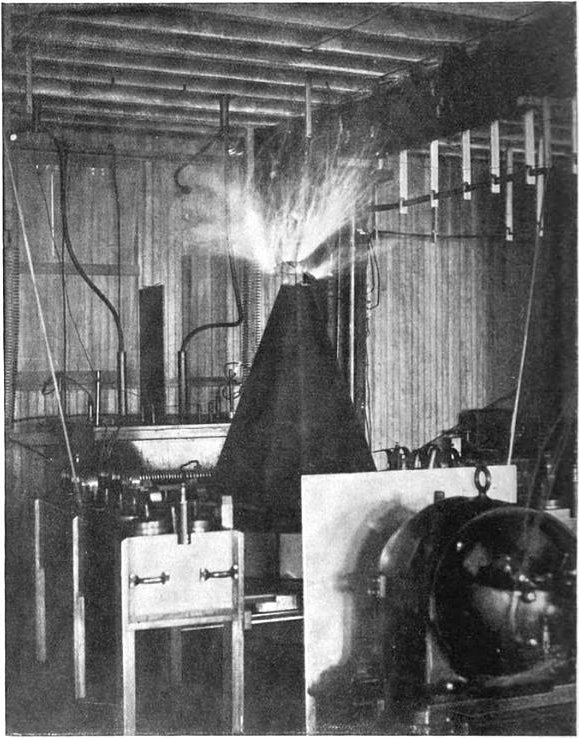
One of Tesla's early coils at his New York lab in 1892, with a conical secondary.

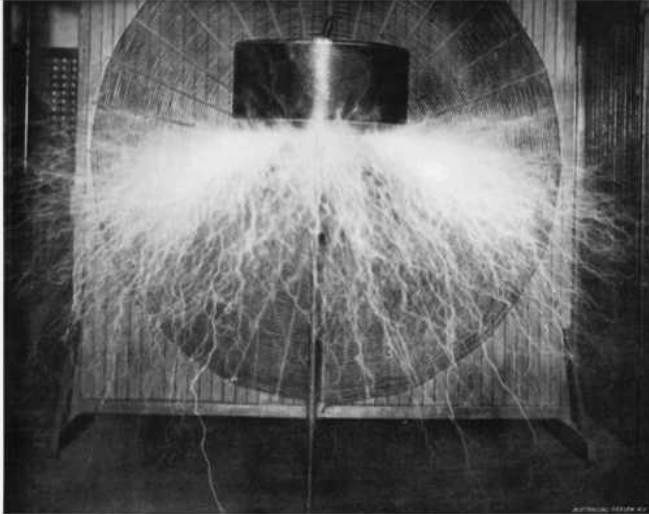
Prototype "magnifying transmitter" in Tesla's New York lab around 1898 producing 2.5 million volts. The round "spiderweb" secondary coil is visible in background

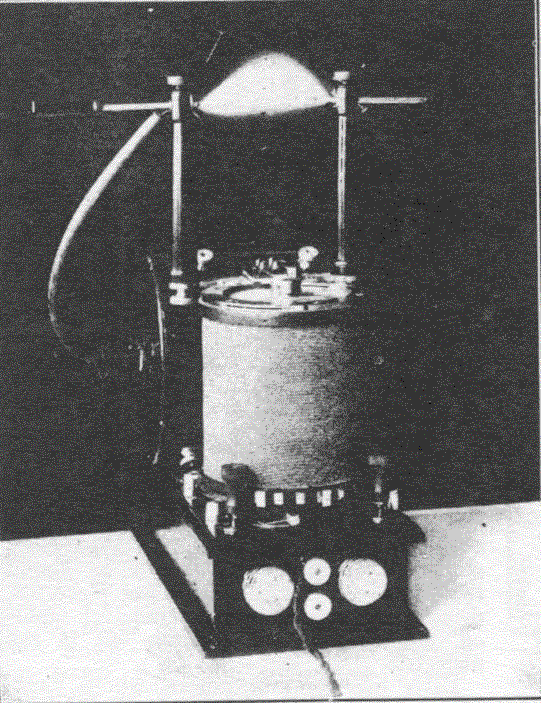
Compact coil designed by Tesla for use as an ozone generator for water treatment

Tesla was not the first to invent this circuit. Henry Rowland built a spark-excited resonant transformer circuit (above) in 1889 and Elihu Thomson had experimented with similar circuits in 1890, including one which could produce 64 inch (1.6 m) sparks, and other sources confirm Tesla was not the first. However he was the first to see practical applications for it and patent it. Tesla did not perform detailed mathematical analyses of the circuit, relying instead on trial and error and his intuitive understanding of resonance. He even realized that the secondary coil functioned as a quarter-wave resonator; he specified the length of the wire in the secondary coil must be a quarter wavelength at the resonant frequency. The first mathematical analyses of the circuit were done by Anton Oberbeck (1895) and Paul Drude (1904).

== Tesla's demonstrations ==
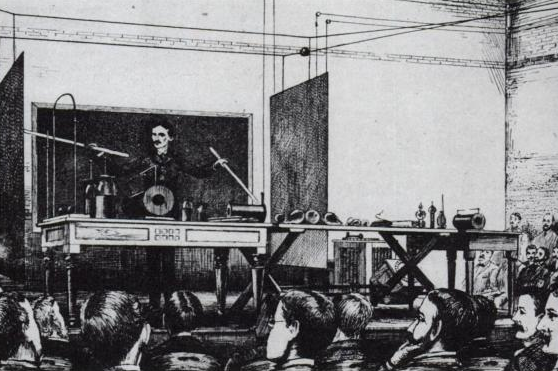
Tesla demonstrating wireless lighting at his 1891 lecture at Columbia College. The two metal sheets are connected to a Tesla coil oscillator, which applies a high radio frequency oscillating voltage. The oscillating electric field between the sheets ionizes the low pressure gas in the two long Geissler tubes he is holding, causing them to glow by fluorescence, similar to neon lights, without wires.

A charismatic showman and self-promoter, in 1891-1893 Tesla used the Tesla coil in dramatic public lectures demonstrating the new science of high voltage, high frequency electricity. The radio frequency AC electric currents produced by a Tesla coil did not behave like the DC or low frequency AC current scientists of the time were familiar with. In lectures at Columbia College May 20, 1891, scientific societies in Britain and France during an 1892 European speaking tour, the Franklin Institute, Philadelphia in February 1893, and the National Electric Light Association, St. Louis in March 1893, he impressed audiences with spectacular brush discharges and streamers, heated iron by induction heating, showed RF current could pass through insulators and be conducted by a single wire without a return path, and powered light bulbs and motors without wires. He demonstrated that high frequency currents often did not cause the sensation of electric shock, applying hundreds of thousands of volts to his own body, causing his body to light up with a glowing corona discharge in the darkened room. These lectures introduced the "Tesla oscillator" to the scientific community, and made Tesla internationally famous.

== Wireless power experiments ==
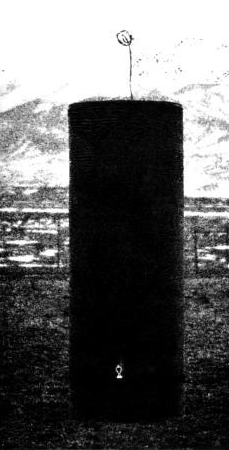
Light bulb (bottom) powered wirelessly by "receiver" coil tuned to resonance with the huge "magnifying transmitter" coil at Tesla's Colorado Springs lab, 1899.

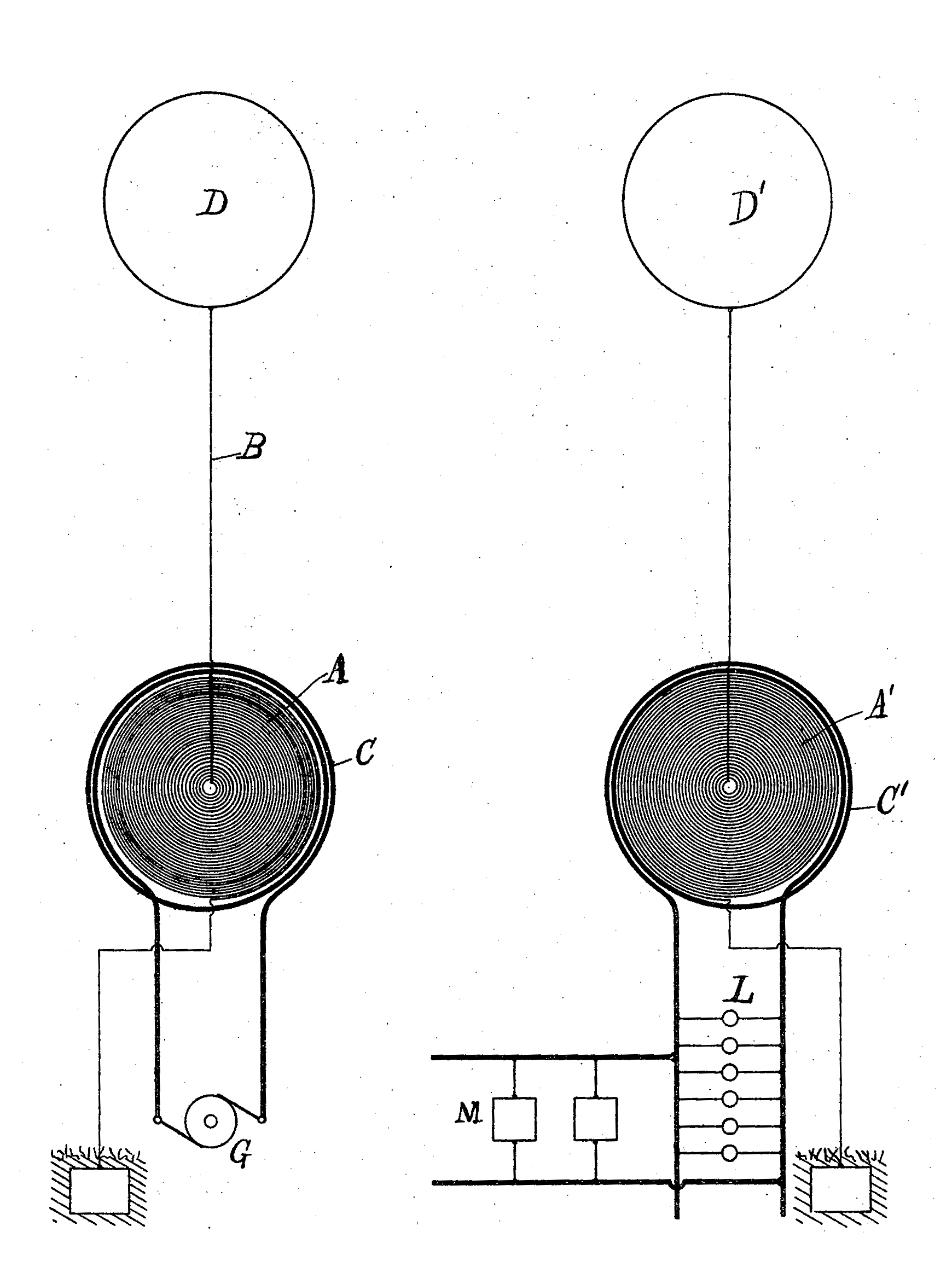
Tesla's proposed wireless power system, from his 1897 patent. The transmitter (left) consists of a Tesla coil (A,C) driving an elevated capacitive terminal (B) suspended by a balloon (D). The receiver (right) is a similar terminal and resonant transformer.

Tesla employed the Tesla coil in his efforts to achieve wireless power transmission, his lifelong dream. In the period 1891 to 1900 he used it to perform some of the first experiments in wireless power, transmitting radio frequency power across short distances by inductive coupling between coils of wire. In his early 1890s demonstrations such as those before the American Institute of Electrical Engineers and at the 1893 Columbian Exposition in Chicago he lit light bulbs from across a room. He found he could increase the distance by using a receiving LC circuit tuned to resonance with the Tesla coil's LC circuit, transferring energy by resonant inductive coupling. At his Colorado Springs laboratory during 1899–1900, by using voltages of the order of 10 million volts generated by his enormous magnifying transmitter coil (described below), he was able to light three incandescent lamps at a distance of about 100 feet (30 m). Today the resonant inductive coupling discovered by Tesla is a familiar concept in electronics, widely used in IF transformers and short range wireless power transmission systems such as cellphone charging pads.

It is now understood that inductive and capacitive coupling are "near-field" effects, so they cannot be used for long-distance transmission. However, Tesla was convinced he could develop a long range wireless power transmission system which could transmit power from power plants directly into homes and factories without wires, described in a visionary June 1900 article in Century Magazine; "The Problem of Increasing Human Energy". He claimed to be able to transmit power on a worldwide scale, using a method that involved conduction through the Earth and atmosphere. Tesla believed that the entire Earth could act as an electrical resonator, and that by driving current pulses into the Earth at its resonant frequency from a grounded Tesla coil with an elevated capacitance, the potential of the Earth could be made to oscillate, creating global standing waves, and this alternating current could be received with a capacitive antenna tuned to resonance with it at any point on Earth. Another of his ideas was that transmitting and receiving terminals could be suspended in the air by balloons at 30,000 feet (9,100 m) altitude, where the air pressure is lower. At this altitude, he thought, a layer of electrically conductive rarefied air would allow electricity to be sent at high voltages (hundreds of millions of volts) over long distances. Tesla envisioned building a global network of wireless power stations, which he called his "World Wireless System", which would transmit both information and electric power to everyone on Earth. There is no reliable evidence that he ever transmitted significant amounts of power beyond the short range demonstrations above.

== Magnifying transmitter ==
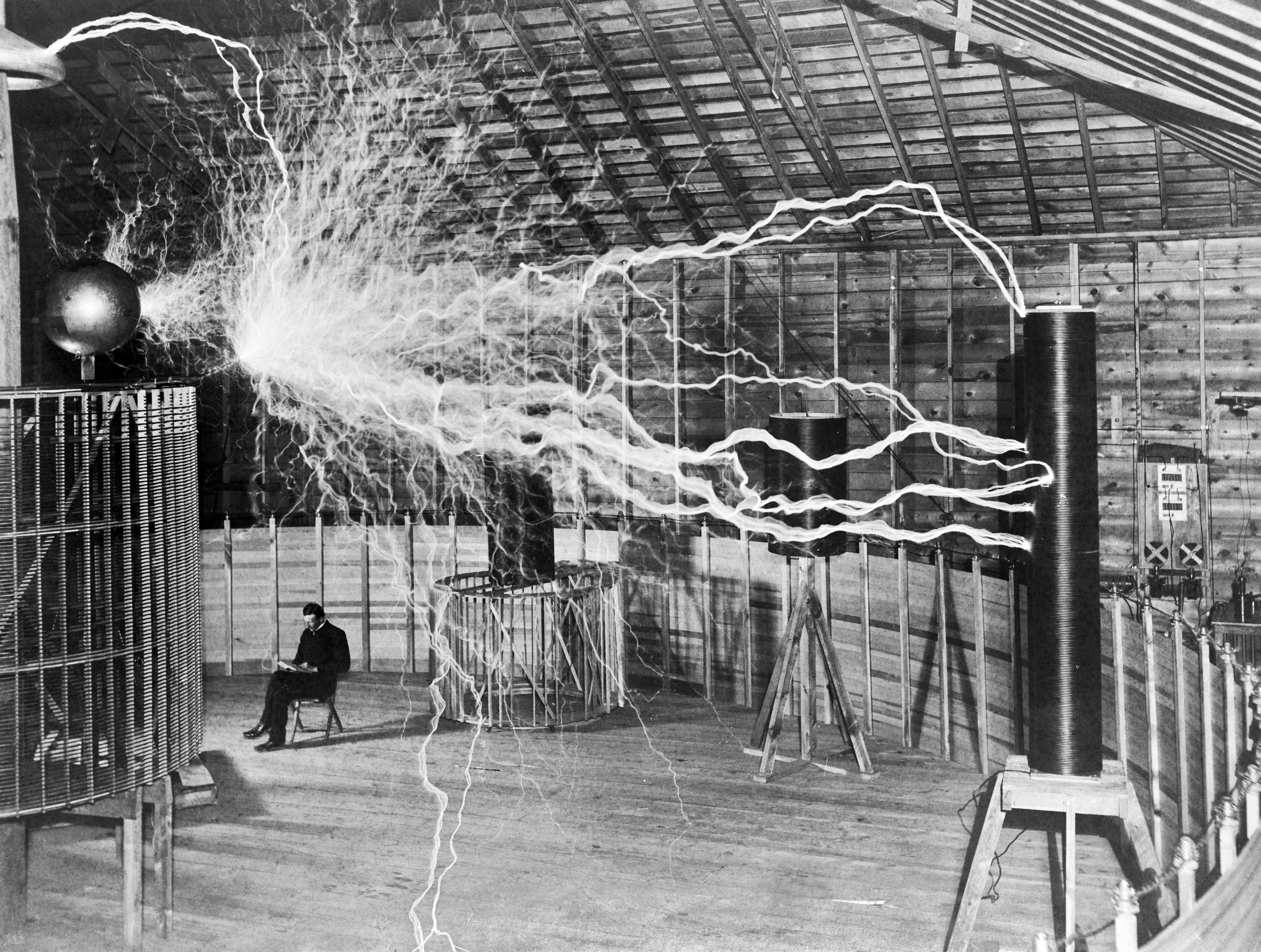
Famous image of magnifying transmitter in operation with Tesla sitting next to it. This is a "trick" photo, a double exposure; Tesla was not in the room when the coil was operating.

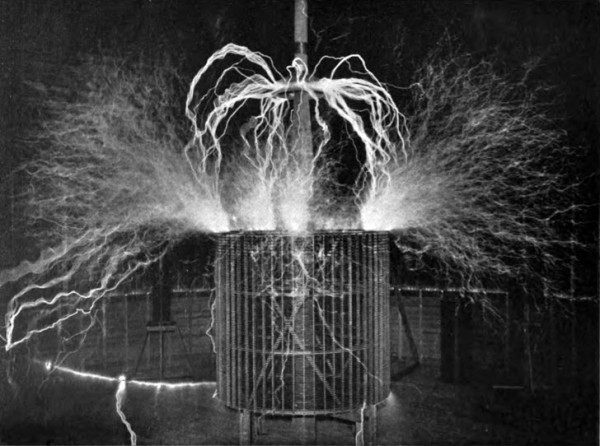
Coil in operation, at -12 million volts. The 10 ft diameter "extra" coil is shown. The 51 ft diameter secondary coil is visible dimly in background, and in the previous photo.

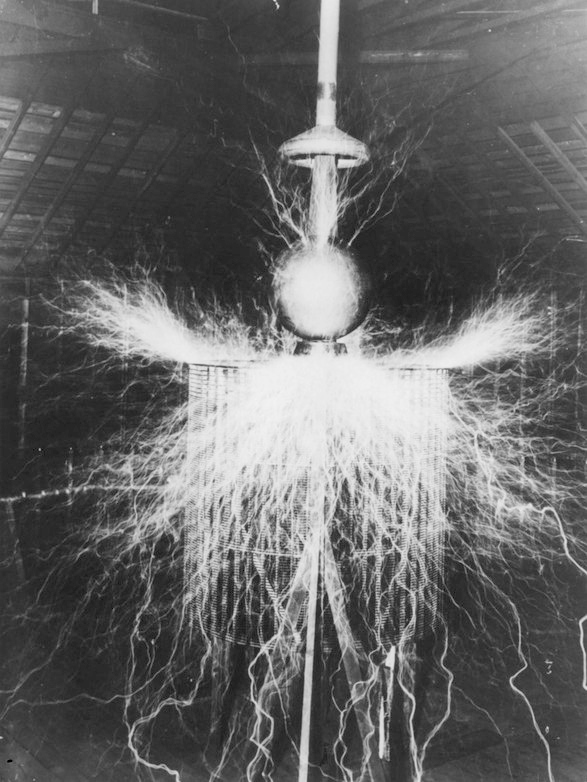
Discharge of same coil with a metal sphere capacitive terminal

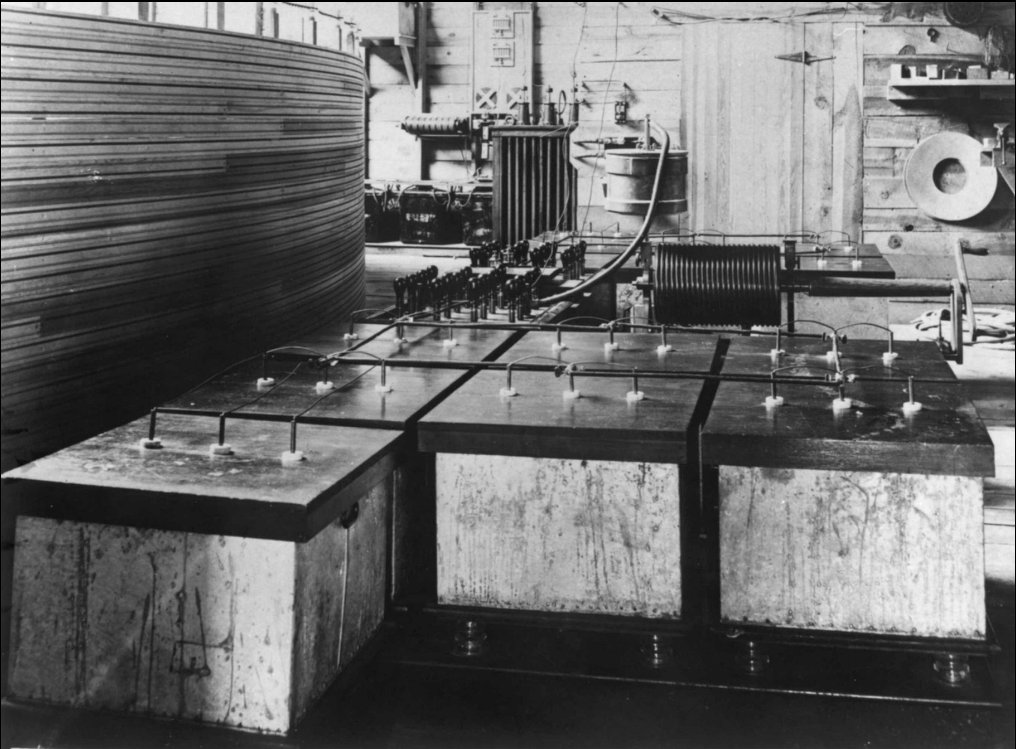
Primary circuit, showing oil capacitor bank (boxes, foreground), 40 kV supply transformer and rotary spark gap (rear), and part of secondary winding (wall, left)

The huge "magnifying transmitter" coil at Tesla's Colorado Springs laboratory, 1899–1900, photos by photographer Dickenson Alley December 1899. The long arcs shown above were not a feature of the normal operation of the transmitter because they wasted energy; for these photos Tesla forced the machine to produce arcs by switching the power rapidly on and off.

Circuit of magnifying transmitter at Tesla's Colorado Springs laboratory. C2 represents the parasitic capacitance between the windings of coil L3.

Tesla's wireless research required increasingly high voltages, and he had reached the limit of the voltages he could generate within the space of his New York lab. Between 1899 and 1900 he built a laboratory in Colorado Springs and performed experiments on wireless transmission there. He chose this location because the polyphase alternating current power distribution system had been introduced there and he had associates who were willing to give him all the power he needed without charging for it. The Colorado Springs laboratory had one of the largest Tesla coils ever built, which Tesla called a "magnifying transmitter" as it was intended to transmit power to a distant receiver. With an input power of 300 kilowatts it could produce potentials of the order of 10 million volts, at frequencies of 50–150 kHz, creating huge "lightning bolts" reportedly up to 135 feet long. During experiments, it caused an overload which destroyed the alternator of the Colorado Springs power company, and Tesla had to rebuild the alternator.

In the magnifying transmitter, Tesla used a modified design (see circuit) which he had developed in his New York lab in the period 1895–1898, and patented in 1902, different from his previous double-tuned circuits. In addition to the primary (L1) and secondary (L2) coils, it had a third coil (L3) which he called the "extra" coil, not magnetically coupled to the others, attached to the top terminal of the secondary. When driven by the secondary it produced additional high voltage by resonance, being adjusted to resonate with its own parasitic capacitance (C2) The use of a series-fed resonator coil to generate high voltages was independently discovered by Paul Marie Oudin in 1893 and employed in his Oudin coil.

The Colorado Springs apparatus consisted of a 51-foot-diameter (15.5 m) Tesla transformer composed of a secondary winding (L2) of 50 turns of heavy wire wound on a 6-foot-high (2 m) circular wooden "fence" around the periphery of the lab, and a single-turn primary (L1) either mounted on the fence or buried in the ground under it. The primary was connected to a bank of oil capacitors (C1) to make a tuned circuit, with a rotary spark gap (SG), powered by 20 to 40 kilovolts from a powerful utility step-up transformer (T). The top of the secondary was connected to the 100-turn 8 ft (2.4 m) diameter "extra" or "resonator" coil (L3) in the center of the room. Its high-voltage end was connected to a telescoping 143-foot (43.6 m) "antenna" rod with a 30-inch (1 m) metal ball on top which could project through the roof of the lab. By cranking the rod up or down he could adjust the capacitance in the circuit of the extra coil, tuning it to resonance with the rest of the circuit.

== Wardenclyffe tower ==
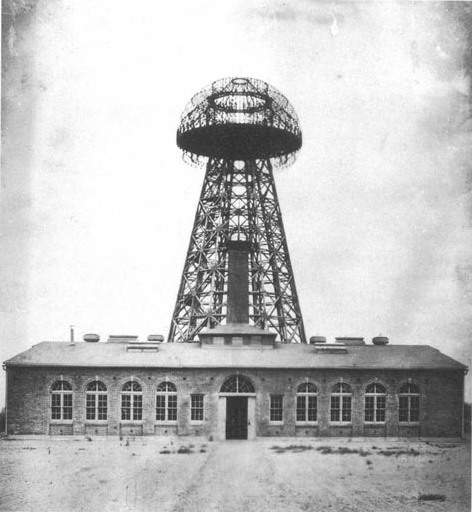
Wardenclyffe Tower wireless station, essentially a huge Tesla coil intended as a prototype transatlantic radiotelegraphy and wireless power transmitter, built by Tesla at Shoreham, NY, 1901-1902. It was never completed.

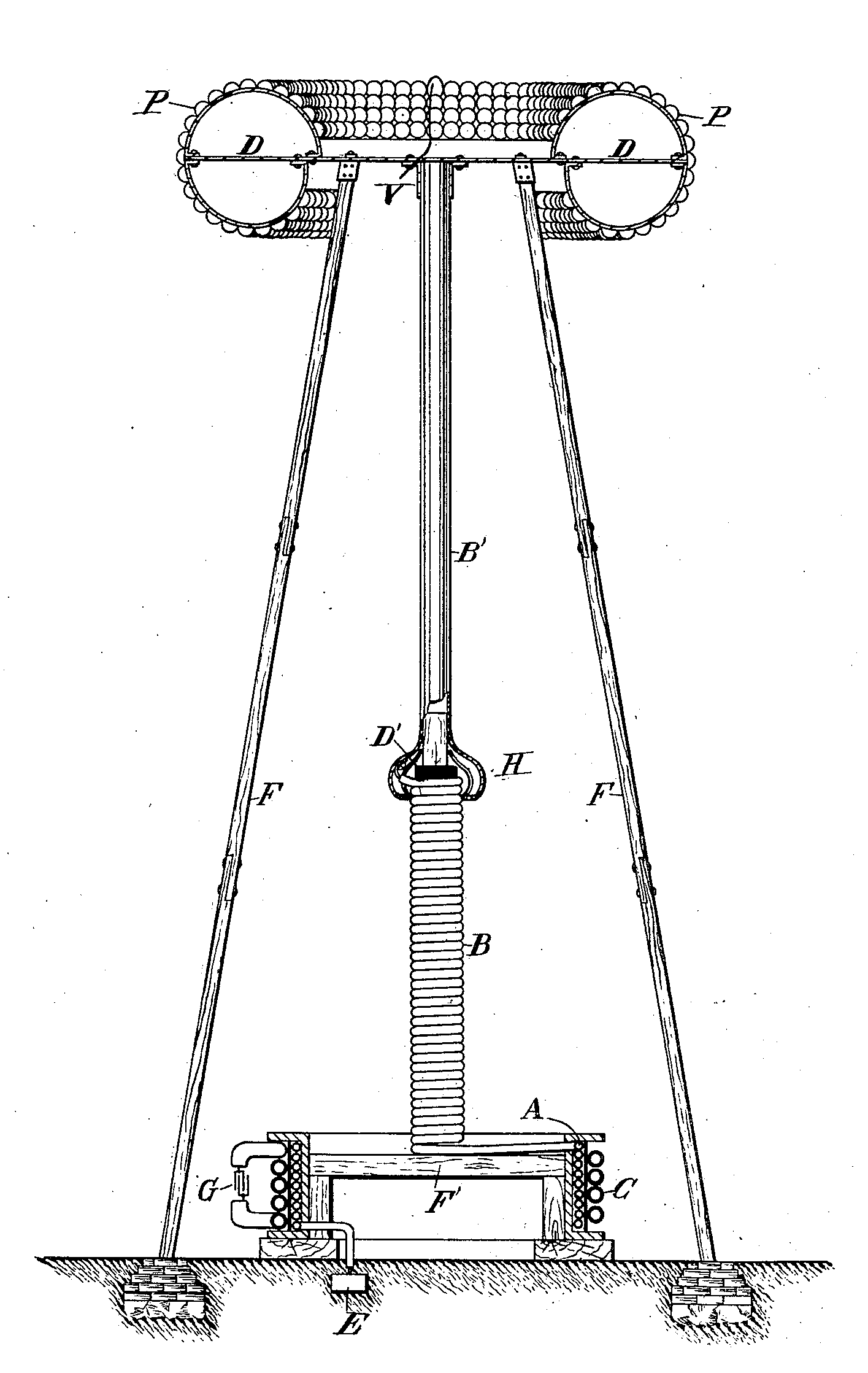
Design on which the Wardenclyffe plant was based, from Tesla's 1902 patent

In 1901, convinced his wireless theories were correct, Tesla with financing from banker J. P. Morgan began construction of a high-voltage wireless station, now called the Wardenclyffe Tower, at Shoreham, New York. Although it was built as a transatlantic radiotelegraphy station, Tesla also intended it to transmit electric power without wires as a prototype transmitter for his proposed "World Wireless System". Essentially an enormous Tesla coil, it consisted of a powerhouse with a 400-horsepower generator and a 187-foot (57 m) tower topped by a 68-foot (21 m) diameter metal dome capacitive electrode. The circuit he used was a version of the "magnifying transmitter" he built at Colorado Springs (above). Underneath the surface was an elaborate ground system that Tesla said was needed to "grip the earth" to create the oscillating earth currents which he believed would transmit the power.

By 1904 his investors had pulled out and the facility was never completed; it was torn down in 1916. Although Tesla seems to have believed his wireless power ideas were proven, he had a history of making claims that he had not confirmed by experiment, and there seems to be no evidence that he ever transmitted significant power beyond the short-range demonstrations mentioned above. The few reports of long-distance power transmission by Tesla are not from reliable sources. For example, a widely repeated myth is that in 1899 he wirelessly lit 200 light bulbs at a distance of 26 miles (42 km). There is no independent confirmation of this supposed demonstration; Tesla did not mention it, and it does not appear in his laboratory notes. It originated in 1944 from Tesla's first biographer, John J. O'Neill, who said he pieced it together from "fragmentary material... in a number of publications".

In the 100 years since, others such as Robert Golka have built equipment similar to Tesla's, but long-distance power transmission has not been demonstrated, and the scientific consensus is his World Wireless system would not have worked. Contemporary scientists point out that while Tesla's coils (with appropriate antennas) can function as radio transmitters, transmitting tiny amounts of energy in the form of radio waves, the frequency he used, around 150 kHz, is far too low for practical long-range power transmission. At these wavelengths the radio waves spread out in all directions and cannot be focused on a distant receiver. Tesla's world power transmission scheme remains today what it was in Tesla's time: a bold, fascinating dream.

== Use in radio ==
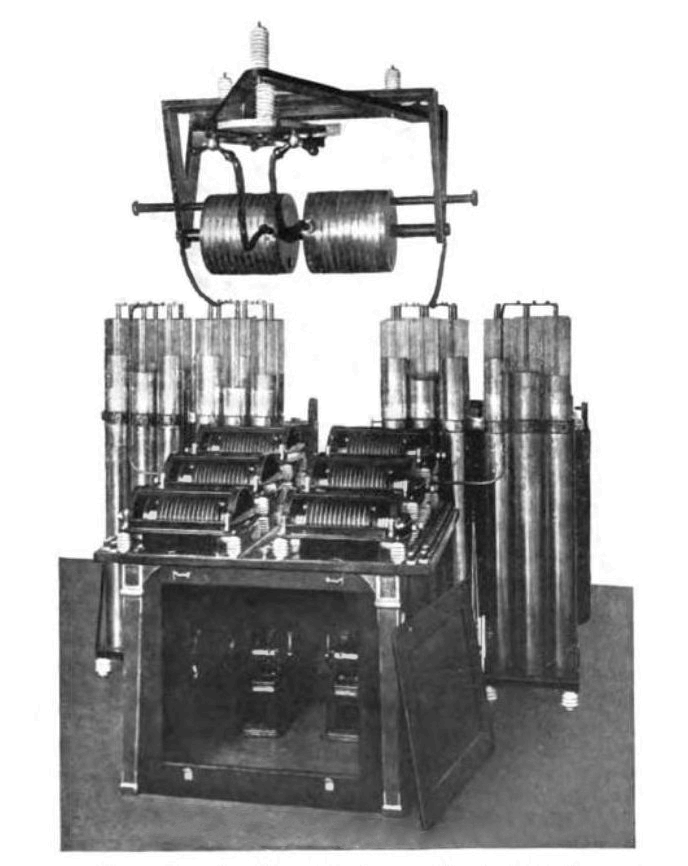
Powerful spark-gap transmitter, showing series spark gaps (horizontal cylindrical objects), Leyden jar capacitors (vertical cylinders, rear), and resonant transformer (top)

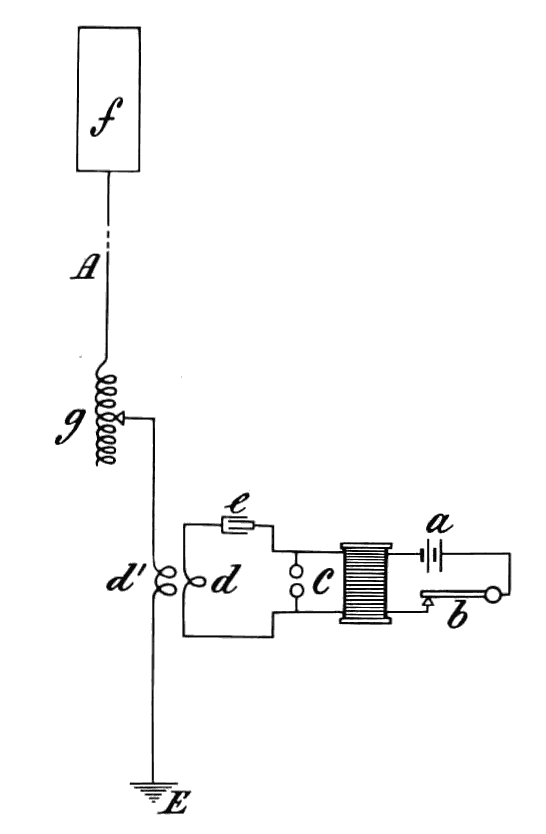
Spark transmitter circuit from Marconi's 1900 patent. Its similarity to a Tesla coil can be seen; the only difference is the addition of a variable inductor (g) to tune the antenna (f) to resonance.

"[The Tesla coil] was invented not for wireless but for making vacuum lamps glow without external electrodes, and it later played a principal part in other hands in the operation of big spark stations." --William H. Eccles, 1933

One of the largest applications of the Tesla coil circuit was in early radio transmitters called spark gap transmitters. The first radio wave generators, invented by Heinrich Hertz in 1887, were spark gaps connected directly to antennas, powered by induction coils. Because they lacked a resonant circuit, these transmitters produced highly damped radio waves. As a result, their transmissions occupied an extremely wide bandwidth of frequencies. When multiple transmitters were operating in the same area their frequencies overlapped and they interfered with one another, causing garbled reception. There was no way for a receiver to select one signal over another.

In 1892 William Crookes, a friend of Tesla, had given a lecture on the uses of radio waves in which he suggested using resonance to reduce the bandwidth in transmitters and receivers. By using resonant circuits, different transmitters could be "tuned" to transmit on different frequencies. With narrower bandwidth, separate transmitter frequencies would no longer overlap, so a receiver could receive a particular transmission by "tuning" its resonant circuit to the same frequency as the transmitter. This is the system used in all modern radio.

With an appropriate wire antenna, the Tesla coil circuit could function as such a narrow-bandwidth radio transmitter. In his March 1893 St. Louis lecture, Tesla demonstrated a wireless system that was the first use of tuned circuits in radio, although he used it for wireless power transmission, not radio communication. A grounded spark-excited capacitor-tuned Tesla transformer attached to an elevated wire antenna transmitted radio waves, which were received across the room by a wire antenna attached to a receiver consisting of a second grounded resonant transformer tuned to the transmitter's frequency, which lighted a Geissler tube. This system, patented by Tesla on September 2, 1897, was the first use of the "four-circuit" concept later claimed by Guglielmo Marconi. However, Tesla was mainly interested in wireless power and never developed a practical radio communication system. He never believed that radio waves could be used for practical communication, instead clinging to an erroneous theory that radio communication was due to currents in the Earth.

Practical radiotelegraphy communication systems were developed by Marconi beginning in 1895. By 1897 the advantages of narrow-bandwidth (lightly damped) systems noted by Crookes were recognized, and resonant circuits, capacitors and inductors, were incorporated in transmitters and receivers. The "closed primary, open secondary" resonant transformer circuit used by Tesla proved a superior transmitter, because the loosely-coupled transformer partially isolated the oscillating primary circuit from the energy-radiating antenna circuit, reducing the damping, allowing it to produce long "ringing" waves which had a narrower bandwidth. Versions of the circuit were patented by Marconi, John Stone Stone and Oliver Lodge, and were widely used in radio for twenty years. In 1906 Max Wien invented the quenched or "series" spark gap, which extinguished the spark after the energy had been transferred to the secondary, allowing the secondary to oscillate freely after that, reducing damping and bandwidth still more.

Although their damping had been reduced as much as possible, spark transmitters still produced damped waves which had a wide bandwidth, creating interference with other transmitters. Around 1920 they became obsolete, superseded by vacuum tube transmitters which generated continuous waves at a single frequency, which could also be modulated to carry sound. Tesla's resonant transformer continued to be used in vacuum tube transmitters and receivers, and is a key component in radio to this day.

During the "spark era" the radio engineering profession gave credit to Tesla; his circuit became known as the "Tesla coil" or "Tesla transformer". However Tesla did not benefit financially, due to competing patent claims. Marconi had claimed rights to the "closed primary open secondary" transmitter circuit in his controversial 1900 "four circuit" wireless patent. Tesla sued Marconi in 1915 for patent infringement, but didn't have the resources to pursue the action. However, in 1943, in a separate suit brought by the Marconi Company against the US government for use of its patents in World War I, the US Supreme Court invalidated Marconi's 1900 patent claim to the "four circuit" concept. The ruling cited the prior patents of Tesla, Lodge, and Stone, but did not decide which of these parties had rights to the circuit. By that time the issue was moot; the patent had expired in 1915 and spark transmitters had long been obsolete.

Although there is some disagreement over the role Tesla himself played in the invention of radio, sources agree on the importance of his circuit in early radio transmitters. From a modern perspective, most spark transmitters could be regarded as Tesla coils.

== Use in medicine ==
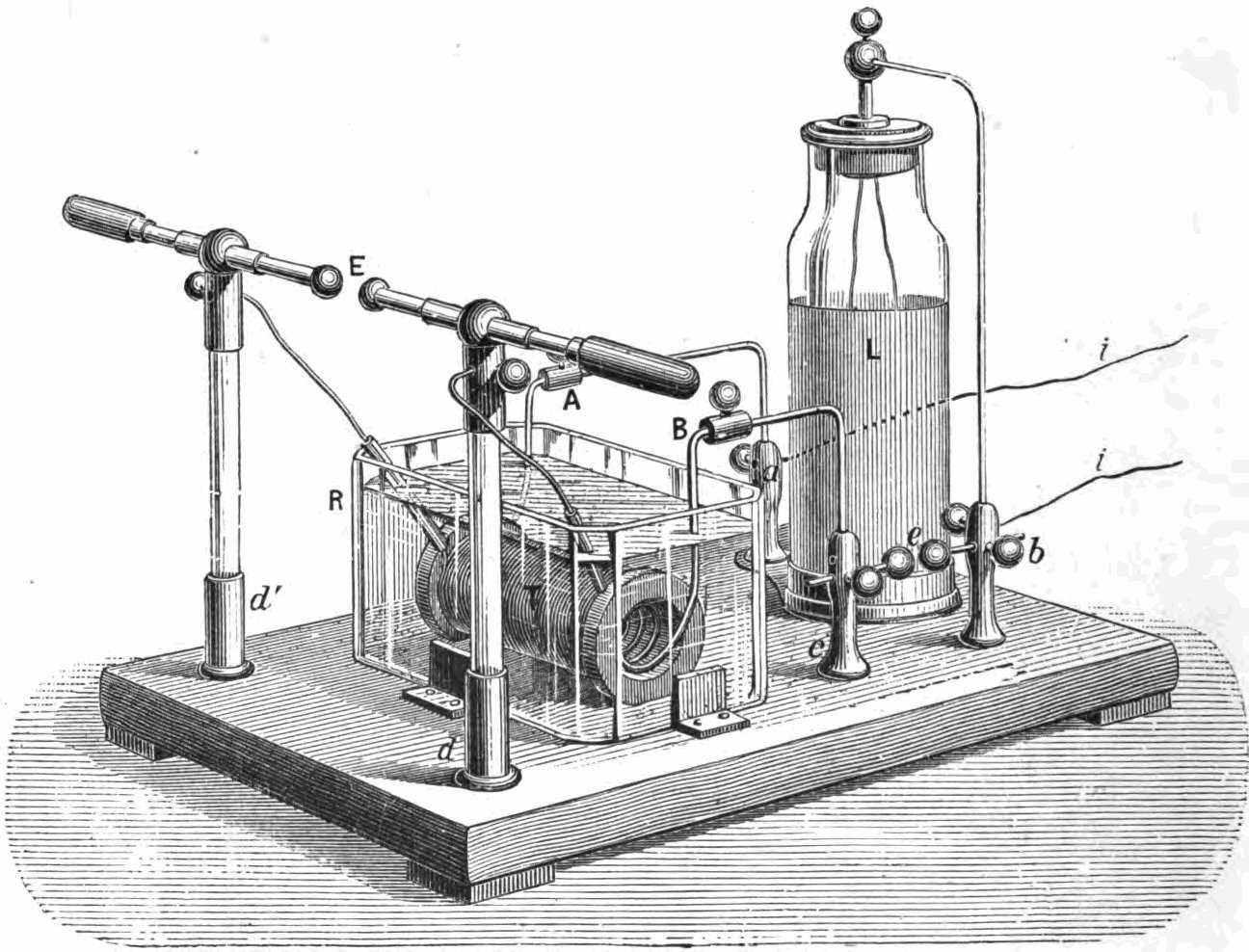
Small Tesla coil for electrotherapy, 1905. The Tesla transformer is immersed in a tank of oil for insulation to prevent arcs.

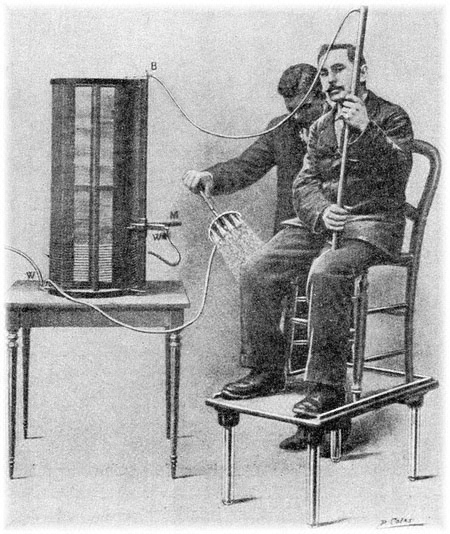
Effluvation treatment of knee with an Oudin coil (left), a high voltage transformer similar to a Tesla coil, 1915

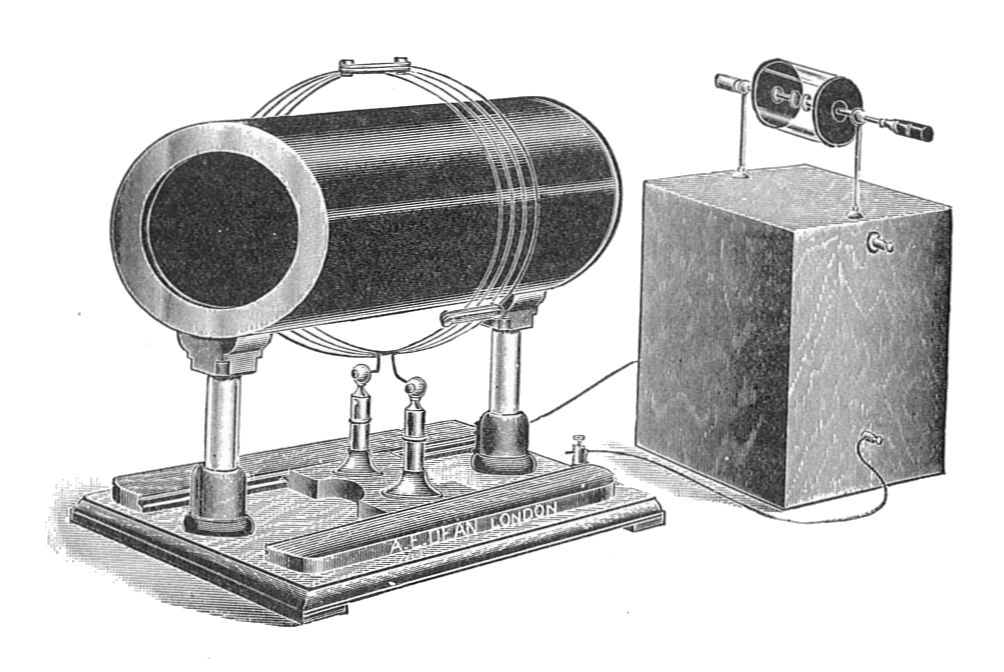
Tesla electrotherapy coil manufactured by Adolphe Gaiffe, around 1900. The primary capacitor is in the box; the spark gap is mounted on top.

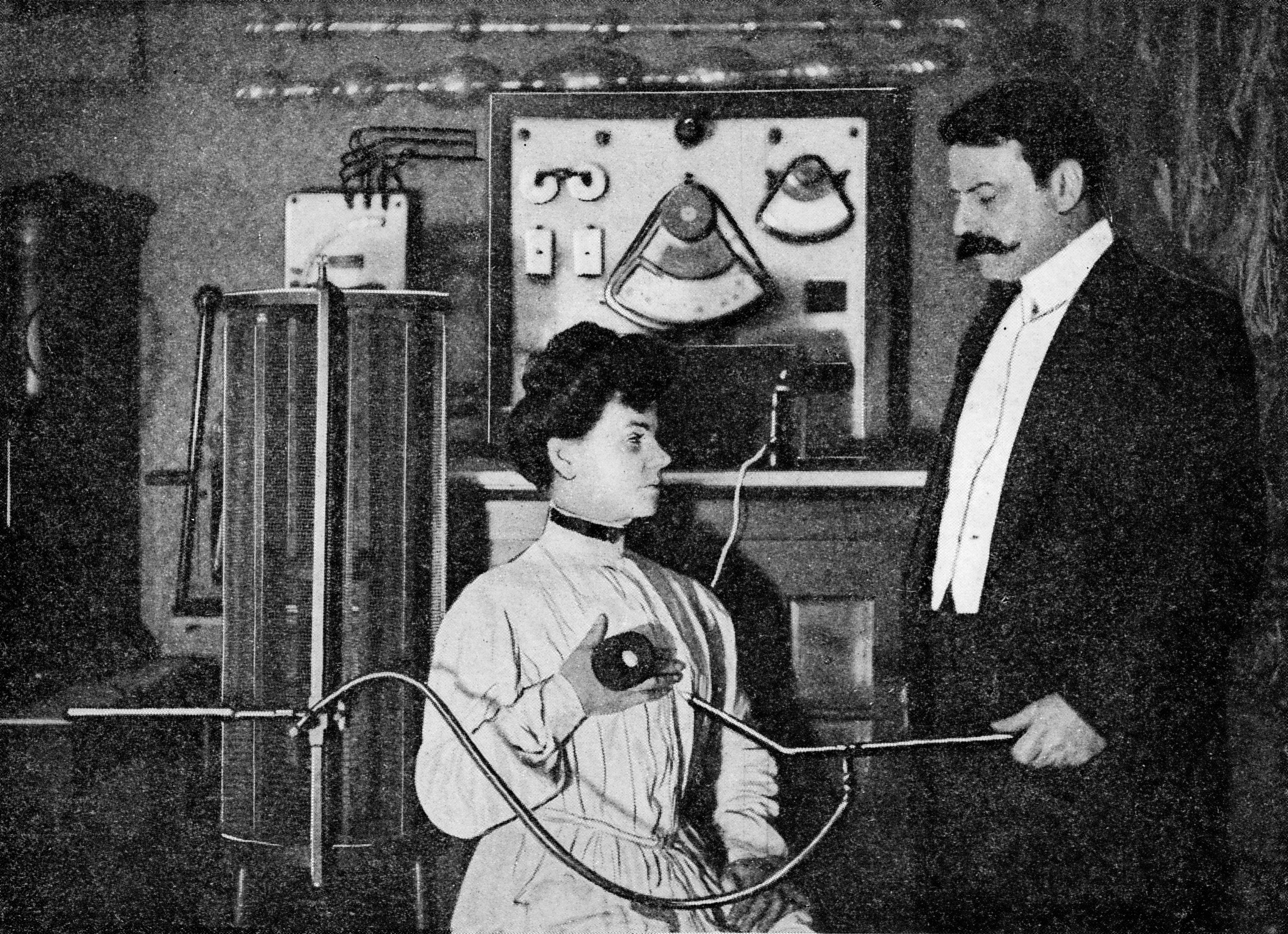
Treatment of cancer with an Oudin coil (left), 1910. The induction coil that powers the Oudin coil is behind the patient's head.

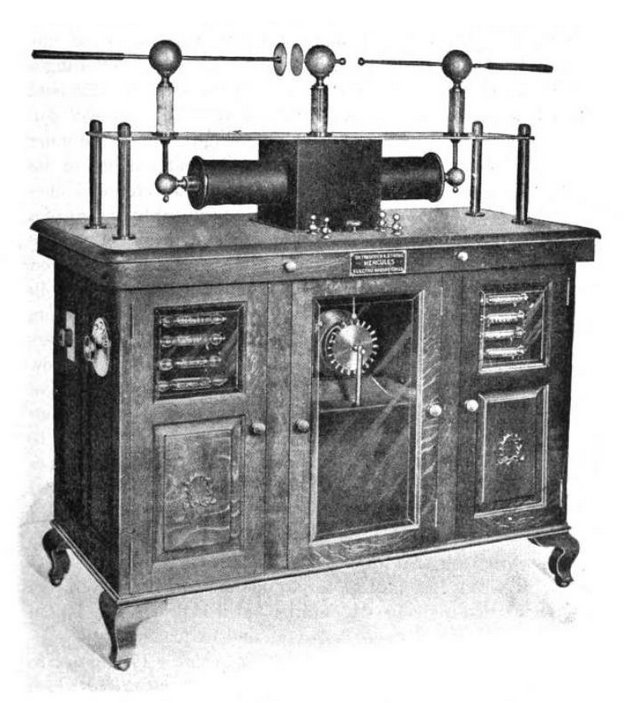
Combined Tesla / D'Arsonval / Oudin electrotherapy and x-ray outfit 1907

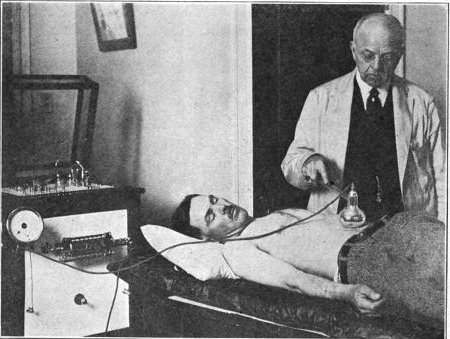
Electrotherapy treatment of diabetes with a vacuum electrode, 1922. The series spark gap is visible mounted on the front of the machine.

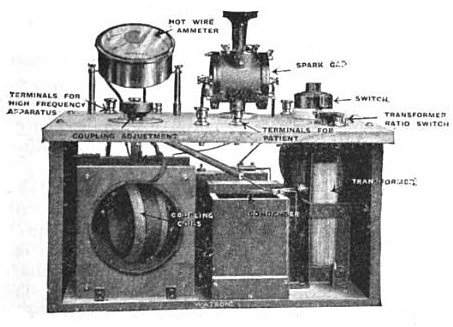
Longwave spark diathermy machine using Tesla circuit, 1921.

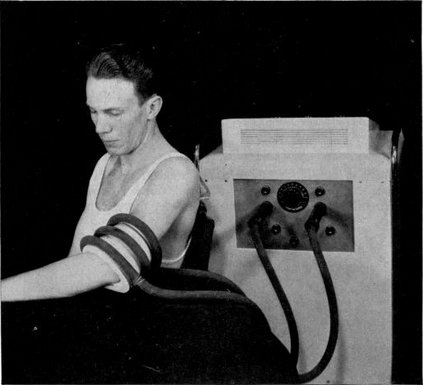
Diathermy of elbow 1945

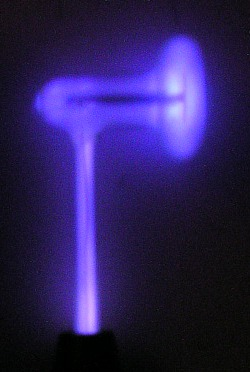
Vacuum electrode "violet ray" wand in operation.

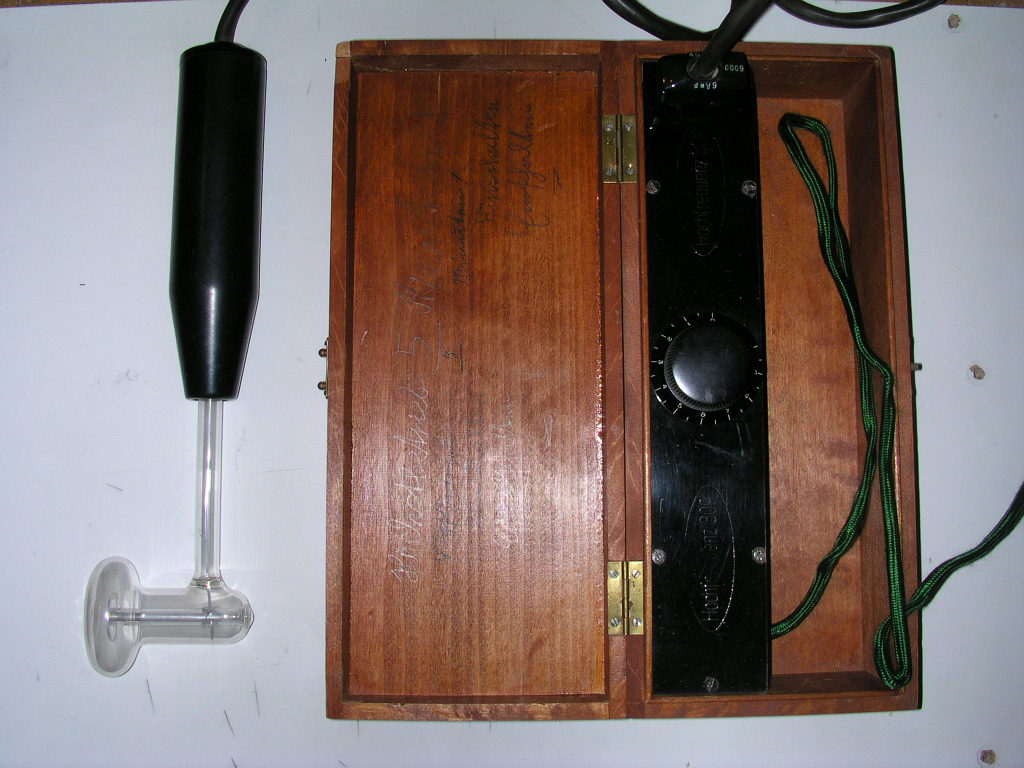
A violet ray wand, a handheld Tesla coil sold as a quack home medical device until about 1940. Said to cure everything from carbuncles to lumbago.

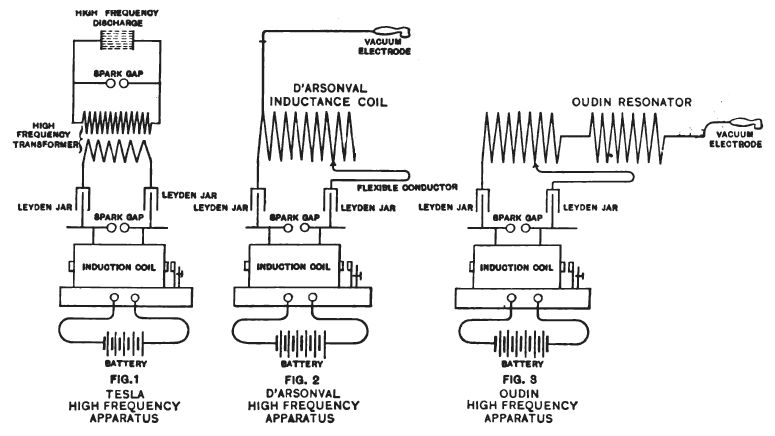
The three circuits used in electrotherapy apparatus in the early 20th century: (1) Tesla coil, (2) D'Arsonval coil, (3) Oudin coil. In medical coils for safety two capacitors (Leyden jars) were used, one in each branch of the primary circuit, to completely isolate the patient's body from the potentially lethal currents of the supply transformer, in case of an electrical fault.

Tesla had observed as early as 1891 that high frequency currents above 100 kHz did not cause the sensation of electric shock, and in fact currents that would be lethal at lower frequencies could be passed through the body without apparent harm. He experimented on himself, and claimed daily applications of high voltage relieved depression. He was one of the first to observe the heating effect of high frequency currents on the body, the basis of diathermy. During his highly publicized early 1890s demonstrations he passed hundreds of thousands of volts through his body. With characteristic hyperbole he called electricity "the greatest of all doctors" and suggested burying wires under classrooms so its stimulating effect would improve performance of "dull" schoolchildren. Tesla wrote two pioneering papers, in 1891 and 1898 on the medical uses of high frequency currents, but did little further work on the subject.

A few other researchers were also experimentally applying high frequency currents to the body at this time. Elihu Thomson, the co-inventor of the Tesla coil, was one, so in medicine the Tesla coil became known as the "Tesla-Thomson apparatus". In France, from 1889 physician and pioneering biophysicist Jacques d'Arsonval had been documenting the physiological effects of high frequency current on the body, and had made the same discoveries as Tesla. During his 1892 European trip Tesla met with D'Arsonval and was flattered to find they were using similar circuits. D'Arsonval's spark-excited resonant circuits (above) did not produce as high voltage as the Tesla transformer. In 1893 French physician Paul Marie Oudin added a "resonator" coil to the D'Arsonval circuit to create the high voltage Oudin coil, a circuit very similar to the Tesla coil, which was widely used for treating patients in Europe.

During this period, people were fascinated by the new technology of electricity, and many believed it had miraculous curative or "vitalizing" powers. Medical ethics were also looser, and doctors could experiment on their patients. By the turn of the century, application of high voltage, "high frequency" currents to the body had become part of a Victorian era medical field, part legitimate experimental medicine and part quack medicine, called electrotherapy. Manufacturers produced medical apparatus to generate "Tesla currents", "D'Arsonval currents", and "Oudin currents" for physicians. In electrotherapy, a pointed electrode attached to the high voltage terminal of the coil was held near the patient, and the luminous brush discharges from it (called "effluves") were applied to parts of the body to treat a wide variety of medical conditions. In order to apply the electrode directly to the skin, or tissues inside the mouth, anus or vagina, a "vacuum electrode" was used, consisting of a metal electrode sealed inside a partially evacuated glass tube, which produced a dramatic violet glow. The glass wall of the tube and the skin surface formed a capacitor which limited the current to the patient, preventing discomfort. These vacuum electrodes were later manufactured with handheld Tesla coils to make "violet ray" wands, sold to the public as a quack home medical device.

The popularity of electrotherapy peaked after World War I, but by the 1920s authorities began to crack down on fraudulent medical treatments, and electrotherapy largely became obsolete. A part of the field that survived was diathermy, the application of high frequency current to heat body tissue, pioneered by German physician Karl Nagelschmidt in 1907. During the 1920s "long wave" (0.5~2 MHz) Tesla coil spark diathermy machines were used, in which the current was applied to the body by electrodes. By the 1930s these were being replaced by "short wave" (10~100 MHz) vacuum tube diathermy machines, which had less danger of causing burns, but Tesla coils continued to be used in both diathermy and quack medical devices like violet ray until World War II. In 1926 William T. Bovie discovered that RF currents applied to a scalpel could cut and cauterize tissue in medical operations, and spark oscillators were used as electrosurgery generators or "Bovies" as late as the 1980s.

During the 1920s and 30s all unipolar (single terminal) high voltage medical coils came to be called Oudin coils, so today's unipolar Tesla coils are sometimes referred to as "Oudin coils".

== Use in show business ==
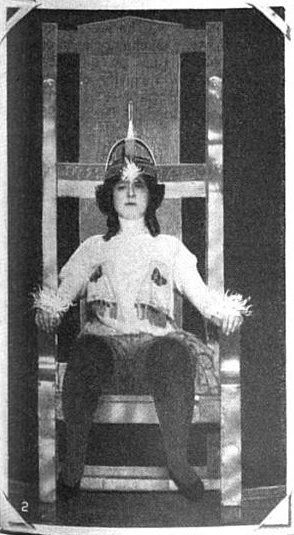
"Electrice" sideshow performer being "electrocuted" 1914

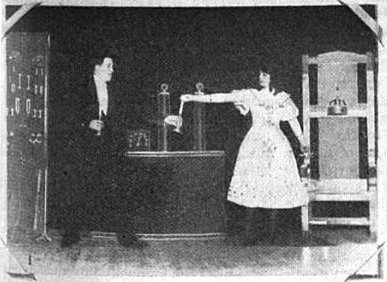
"Electrice" lighting a candle with brush discharge from her fingers. The current came from the electric chair she is touching, which is connected to the Tesla coil in the background.

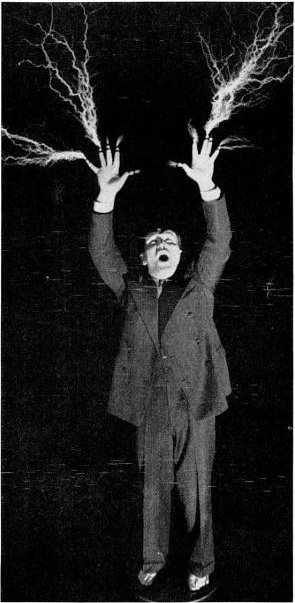
Evangelist Irwin Moon shooting "lightning bolts" from fingers, 1938.

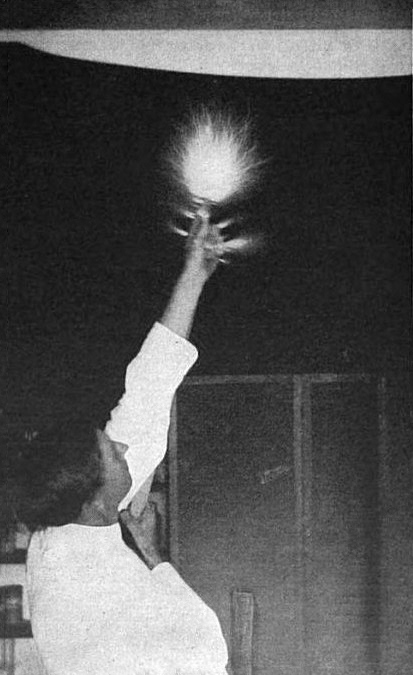
Demonstrating 10 inch (25 cm) brush discharge from hand, 1913

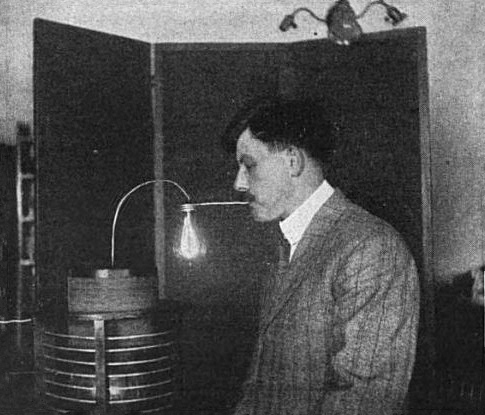
RF current from Tesla coil lights the bulb's filament as it passes through the wire to charge and discharge the performer's body, which acts as a capacitor plate.

Turn-of-the-century sideshow performers did stunts with Tesla coils that would be considered extremely dangerous today.

The Tesla coil's spectacular displays of sparks, and the fact that its currents could pass through the human body without causing electric shock, led to its use in the entertainment business.

In the early 20th century it appeared in traveling carnivals, freak shows and circus and carnival sideshows, which often had an act in which a performer would pass high voltages through their body Performers such as "Dr. Resisto", "The Human Dynamo", "Electrice", "The Great Volta", and "Madamoiselle Electra" would have their body connected to the high voltage terminal of a hidden Tesla coil, causing sparks to shoot from their fingertips and other parts of their body, and neon lights and fluorescent tube lamps to light up when brought near them. They could also light candles or cigarettes with their fingers. Although they didn't usually cause electric shocks, RF arc discharges from the bare skin could cause painful burns; to prevent them performers sometimes wore metal thimbles on their fingertips (Rev. Moon, center image above, is using them). These acts were extremely dangerous and could kill the performer if the Tesla coil was misadjusted. In carny lingo this was called an "electric chair act" because it often included a spark-laced "electrocution" of the performer in an electric chair, exploiting public fascination with this exotic new method of capital punishment, which had become the United States' dominant method of execution around 1900. Today entertainers still perform high voltage acts with Tesla coils, but modern bioelectromagnetics has brought a new awareness of the hazards of Tesla coil currents, and allowing them to pass through the body is today considered extremely dangerous.

Tesla coils were also used as dramatic props in early mystery and science fiction motion pictures, starting in the silent era. The crackling, writhing sparks emanating from the electrode of a giant Tesla coil became Hollywood's iconic symbol of the "mad scientist's" lab, recognized throughout the world. This was probably because the eccentric Nikola Tesla himself, with his famous high voltage demonstrations and his mysterious Colorado Springs laboratory, was one of the main prototypes from which the "mad scientist" stock character originated. Some early films in which Tesla coils appeared were Wolves of Kultur (1918), The Power God (1926), Metropolis (1927), Frankenstein (1931) and its many sequels such as Son of Frankenstein (1939), The Mask of Fu Manchu (1932), Chandu the Magician (1932), The Lost City (1935), and The Clutching Hand (1936) and many later films and television shows. By the 1980s, effects like high voltage sparks were being added to movies by CGI as visual effects in post-production, eliminating the need for dangerous high voltage Tesla coils on sets.

The Tesla coils for many of these movies were constructed by Kenneth Strickfaden (1896-1984) who, beginning with his spectacular effects in the 1931 Frankenstein, became Hollywood's preeminent electrical special effects expert. His large "Meg Senior" Tesla coil seen in many of these movies consisted of a 6-foot 1000 turn conical secondary and a 10 turn primary, connected to a capacitor through a rotary spark gap, powered by a 20 kV transformer. It could produce 6 foot sparks. Some of his last gigs were the reassembly of the original 1931 Frankenstein high voltage apparatus for the Mel Brooks satire Young Frankenstein (1974), and construction of a million volt Tesla coil which produced 12 foot sparks for a 1976 stage show by the rock band Kiss.

== Use in education ==
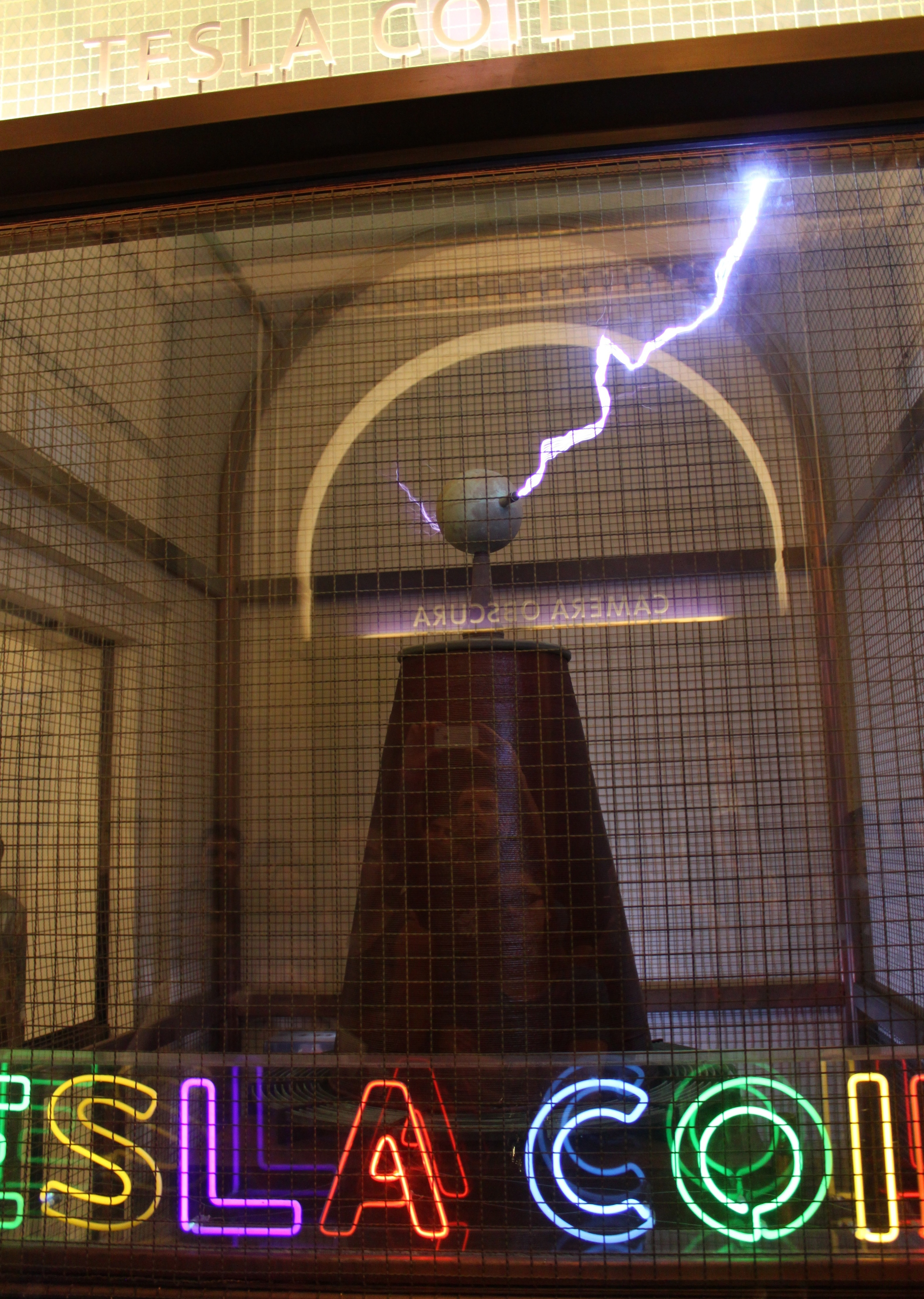
Million volt Griffith Park Observatory coil, Los Angeles. Over 100 years old, it is one of the oldest working Tesla coils.

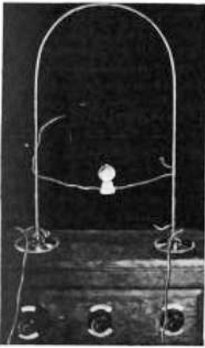
Demonstration of inductance with a Tesla coil, 1906. RF current will not pass through the heavy copper wire because of the bend, and passes through the lamp instead.

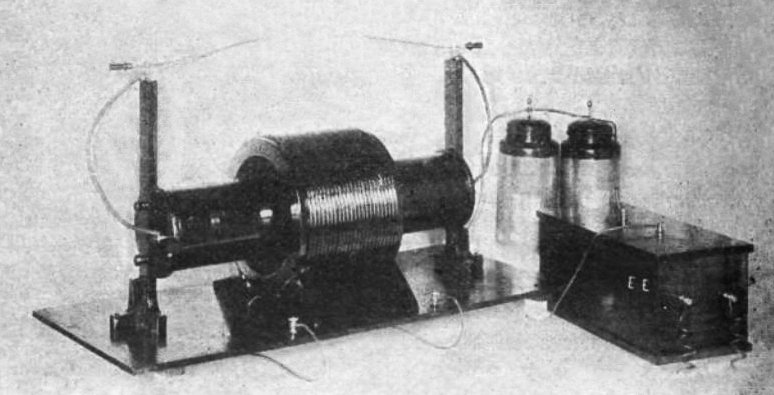
Small educational Tesla coil kit, 1918

Ever since Tesla's 1890s lectures, Tesla coils have been used as attractions in educational exhibits and science fairs. They have become a way to counter the stereotype that science is boring. In the early 20th century, experts like Henry Transtrom and Earle Ovington gave high voltage demonstrations at "electric fairs". High school classes built Tesla coils.

From 1933 into the 1980s, between movie jobs Hollywood special effects expert Ken Strickfaden would take his high voltage apparatus on the road in an exhibition called "Science on Parade" and later "The Kenstric Space Age Science Show" to high schools, colleges, World Fairs and expositions. These spectacular shows, which reached 48 states, had a seminal influence on the birth of the modern "coiling" movement. A number of present-day Tesla hobbyists such as William Wysock say they were inspired to build Tesla coils by seeing Strickfaden's show.

One of the oldest and best-known coils still in operation is the "GPO-1" at Griffith Observatory in Los Angeles. It was originally one of a pair of coils built in 1910 by Earle L. Ovington, a friend of Tesla and manufacturer of high voltage electrotherapy apparatus. For a number of years Ovington displayed them at the December electrical trade show at Madison Square Garden in New York City, using them for demonstrations of high voltage science, which Tesla himself sometimes attended. Called the Million Volt Oscillator, the twin coils were installed on the balcony at the show. Every hour the lights were dimmed and the public was treated to a display of 10 foot arcs. Ovington gave the coils to his friend Dr. Frederick Finch Strong, whose work focused on electrotherapy as an alternative health treatment. In 1937 Strong donated the coils to the Griffith Observatory. The museum didn't have room to display both, but one coil was restored by Kenneth Strickfaden and has been in daily operation ever since. It consists of a 48 in. (1.2 m) high conical secondary coil topped by a 12 in. (30 cm) diameter copper ball electrode, with a 9-turn spiral primary of 2 in. copper strip, a glass plate capacitor (replacing the original Leyden jars), and rotary spark gap. Its output has been estimated at 1.3 million volts.

== Later uses ==
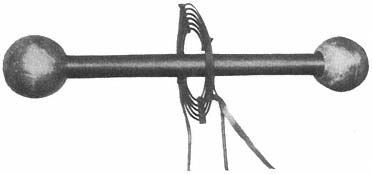
Breit and Tuve's 5 MV Tesla coil used as particle accelerator, 1928

In addition to its use in spark-gap radio transmitters and electrotherapy described above, the Tesla coil circuit was also used in the early 20th century in x-ray machines, ozone generators for water purification, and induction heating equipment. However, in the 1920s vacuum tube oscillators replaced it in all these applications. The triode vacuum tube was a much better radio frequency current generator than the noisy, hot, ozone-producing spark, and could produce continuous waves. After this, industrial use of the Tesla coil was mainly limited to a few specialized applications which were suited to its unique characteristics, such as high voltage insulation testing.

In 1926, pioneering accelerator physicists Merle Tuve and Gregory Breit built a 5 million volt Tesla coil as a linear particle accelerator. The bipolar coil consisted of a pyrex tube a meter long wound with 8000 turns of fine wire, with round corona caps on each end, and a 5 turn spiral primary coil surrounding it at the center. It was operated in a tank of insulating oil pressurized to 500 psi which allowed it to reach a potential of 5.2 megavolts. Although it was used for a short period in 1929-30 it was not a success because the particles' acceleration had to be completed within the brief period of a half cycle of the RF voltage.

In 1970 Robert K. Golka built a replica of Tesla's huge Colorado Springs magnifying transmitter in a shed at Wendover Air Force Base, Utah, using data he found in Tesla's lab notes archived at the Nikola Tesla Museum in Belgrade, Serbia. This was one of the first experiments with the magnifier circuit since Tesla's time. The coil generated 12 million volts. Golka used it to try to duplicate Tesla's reported synthesis of ball lightning.
