= True wireless =

True wireless may refer to:

- The True Wireless, a 1919 article by Nikola Tesla; see World Wireless System
- Wireless wide area network
- True wireless headphones
