= World Wireless System =

Proposed telecommunications and electrical power delivery system by Nikola Tesla

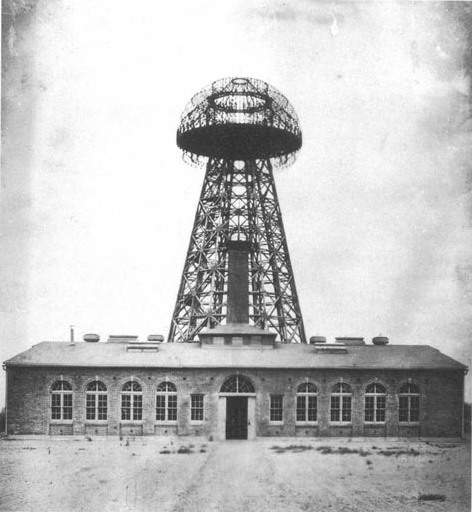
The Wardenclyffe Power Plant prototype, intended by Nikola Tesla to be a "World Wireless" telecommunications facility.

The World Wireless System was a turn of the 20th century proposed telecommunications and electrical power delivery system designed by inventor Nikola Tesla based on his theories of using Earth and its atmosphere as electrical conductors. He claimed this system would allow for "the transmission of electric energy without wires" on a global scale as well as point-to-point wireless telecommunications and broadcasting. He made public statements citing two related methods to accomplish this from the mid-1890s on. By the end of 1900 he had convinced banker J. P. Morgan to finance construction of a wireless station (eventually sited at Wardenclyffe, Long Island, New York) based on his ideas intended to transmit messages across the Atlantic to England and to ships at sea. His decision to change the design to include wireless power transmission to better compete with Guglielmo Marconi's new radio based telegraph system was met with Morgan's refusal to fund the changes. The project was abandoned in 1906, never to become operational.

During this period Tesla filed numerous patents associated with the basic functions of his system, including transformer design, transmission methods, tuning circuits, and methods of signaling. He also described a plan to have some thirty Wardenclyffe-style telecommunications stations positioned around the world to be tied into existing telephone and telegraph systems. He would continue to elaborate to the press and in his writings for the next few decades on the system's capabilities and how it was superior to radio-based systems.

Despite claims of having "carried on practical experiments in wireless transmission", there is no documentation he ever transmitted power beyond relatively short distances and modern scientific opinion is generally that his wireless power scheme would not have worked.

== History ==
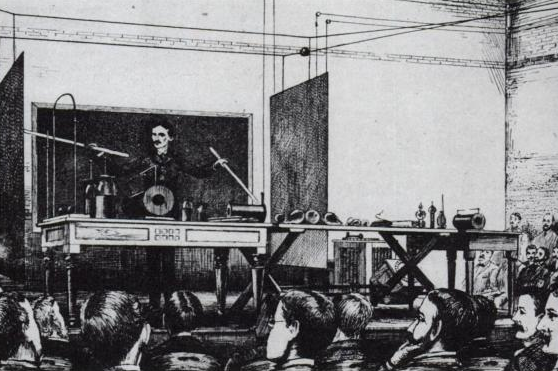
Illustration of Tesla in 1891 showing two partially evacuated tubes illuminated by a rapidly alternating electrostatic field created between two metallic sheets.

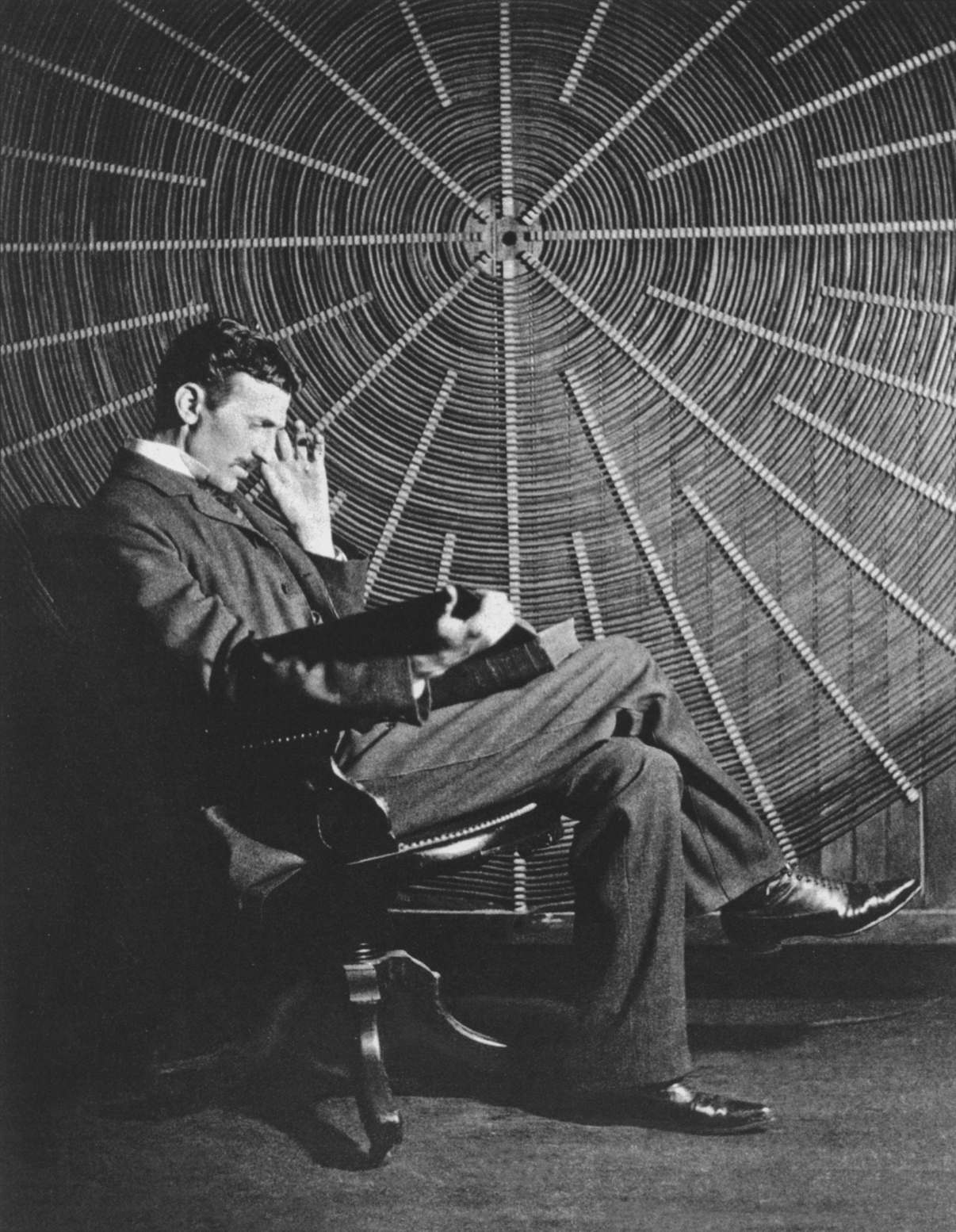
Tesla sits in front of a spiral coil from a high-voltage transformer at his East Houston Street, New York laboratory in 1896.

=== Origins ===
Tesla's ideas for a World Wireless system grew out of experiments beginning in the early 1890s after learning of Hertz's experiments with electromagnetic waves using induction coil transformers and spark gaps. He duplicated those experiments and then went on to improve Hertz's wireless transmitter, developing various alternator apparatus and his own high tension transformer, known as the Tesla coil. His primary interest in wireless phenomenon was as a power distribution system, early on pursuing wireless lighting. From 1891 on Tesla was delivering lectures including "Experiments with Alternate Currents of High Potential and High Frequency" in 1892 in London, England and in Paris, France and went on to demonstrate "wireless lighting" in 1893 including lighting Geissler tubes wirelessly.

==== One-wire transmission ====
The first experiment was the operation of light and motive devices connected by a single wire to one terminal of a high frequency induction coil, performed during the 1891 New York City lecture at Columbia College. While a single terminal incandescent lamp connected to one of an induction coil's secondary terminals does not form a closed circuit "in the ordinary acceptance of the term" the circuit is closed in the sense that a return path is established back to the secondary by capacitive coupling or 'displacement current'. This is due to the lamp's filament or refractory button capacitance relative to the coil's free terminal and environment; the free terminal also has capacitance relative to the lamp and environment.

==== Wireless transmission ====
The second result demonstrated how energy can be made to go through space without any connecting wires. The wireless energy transmission effect involves the creation of an electric field between two metal plates, each being connected to one terminal of an induction coil's secondary winding. A gas discharge tube was used as a means of detecting the presence of the transmitted energy. Some demonstrations involved lighting of two partially evacuated tubes in an alternating electrostatic field while held in the hand of the experimenter.

=== Development ===
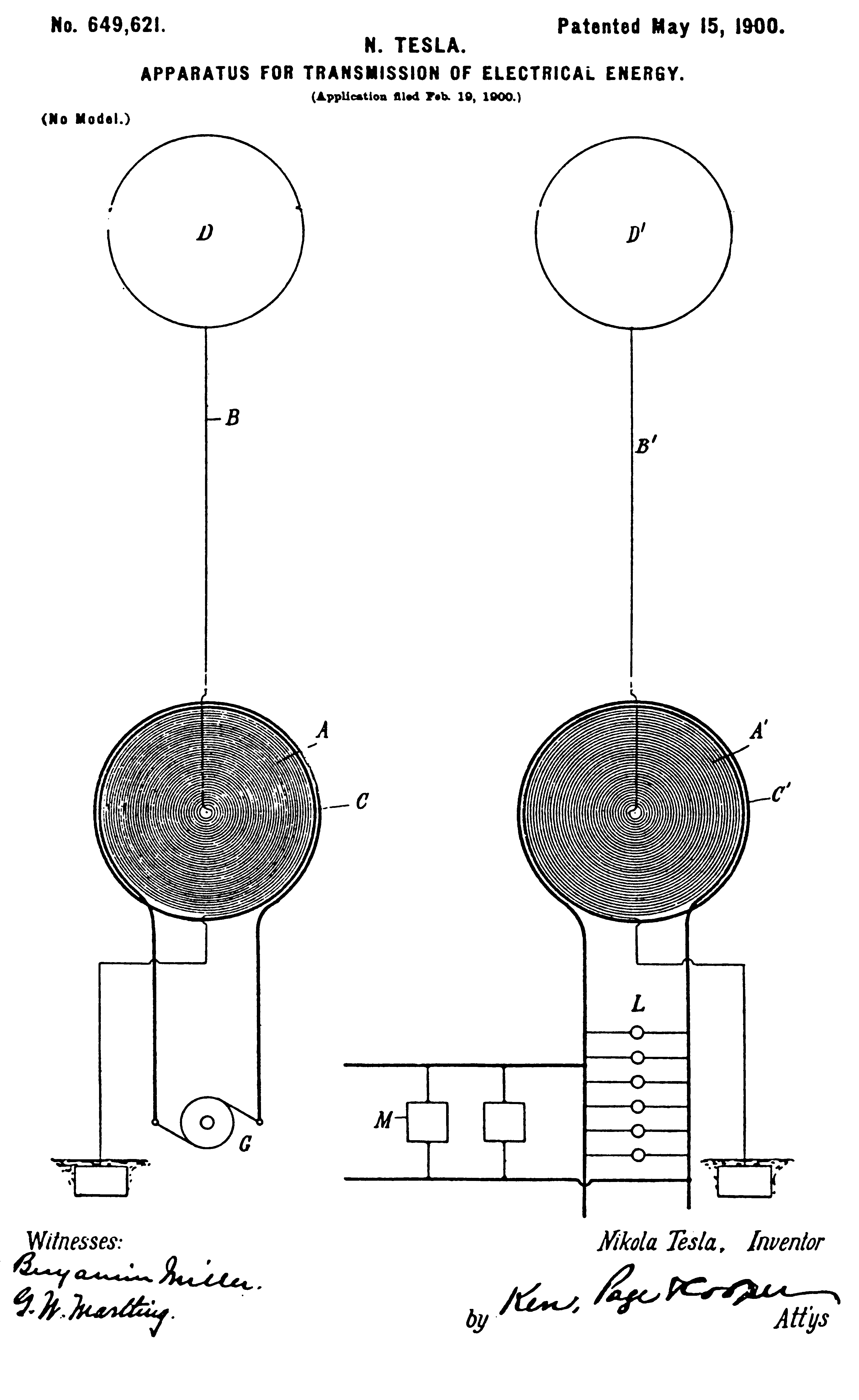
Drawing from the 1897 U.S. patent 649,621 "Apparatus for Transmission of Electrical Energy" (along with U.S. patent 645,576), shows Tesla's concept of transmitting electrical energy through the upper atmosphere via terminals supported by balloons tethered at up to 35,000 feet above sea level.

While formulating his theories in the early 1890s Tesla discarded the idea of using radio waves. He did not necessarily believe that radio waves existed as theorized by Maxwell, and he agreed with what most physicists were saying at the time: that radio waves would travel in a straight line in the same way that visible light travels, limiting their use for long-range communication. (Radio waves do travel in a straight line, but this was many years before the discovery that the ionosphere would reflect certain radio waves making skywave communication of shortwave frequency bands possible over long distances.)

He believed that transmitting electrical signals beyond a line-of-sight distance would require the use of planet Earth as a conducting medium to overcome this limitation. By the end of 1895, he made statements to the press about the possibility that "Earth's electrical charge can be disturbed, and thereby electrical waves can be efficiently transmitted to any distance without the use of cables or wires", and that the electrical waves can be used to transmit "intelligible signals" and "motive power." On April 11, 1896, he stated that "messages might be conducted to all parts of the globe simultaneously" using electric waves "propagated through the atmosphere and even the ether beyond." In September 1897 he applied for a patent on a wireless power transmission scheme consisting of transmitting power between two tethered balloons maintained at 30,000 feet, an altitude where he thought a conductive layer should exist.

Between 1895 and 1898, he constructed a large resonance transformer in his New York City laboratory called a magnifying transmitter to test his earth conduction theories. In 1899 he carried out large scale experiments at Colorado Springs, Colorado. Based on his measurements there, he concluded that the Earth was "literally alive with electrical vibrations." He noted that lightning strikes indicate that the Earth is a large conductor with waves of energy traveling around it. He constructed a large magnifying transmitter measuring fifty-one feet (16 m) in diameter which could develop a working potential estimated at 3.5 million to 4 million volts and was capable of producing electrical discharges exceeding one hundred feet (30 m) in length. With it he tested earth conduction and lit incandescent electric lamps adjacent to his lab in demonstrations of wireless power transmission.

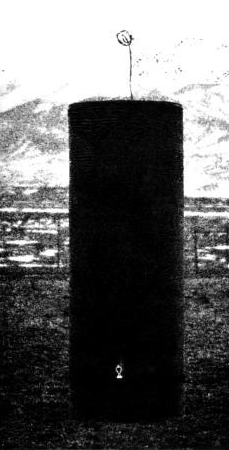
In Colorado Springs, a Tesla coil receiver tuned in resonance with a Tesla coil transmitter illuminates a 10-watt incandescent lamp. The distance from the transmitter's ground plate to the point of reception is 1,938 feet (591 m).

Upon returning to New York City from Colorado Springs in 1900 he sought venture capitalists to fund what he viewed as a revolutionary wireless communication and electric power delivery system using the Earth as the conductor. By the end of 1900 he had gained the attention of financier J. P. Morgan who agreed to fund a pilot project (later to become the Wardenclyffe project) which, based on his theories, would be capable of transmitting messages, telephony, and even facsimile images across the Atlantic to England and to ships at sea. Morgan was to receive a controlling share in the company as well as half of all the patent income. Almost as soon as the contract was signed Tesla decided to scale up the facility to include his ideas of terrestrial wireless power transmission to better compete with Guglielmo Marconi's radio based telegraph system. Morgan refused to fund the changes and, when no additional investment capital became available, the project at Wardenclyffe was abandoned in 1906, never to become operational.

Construction of the Wardenclyffe "wireless plant" in Shoreham started towards the end of 1901 and continued for the next three years. The plant included a Stanford White–designed 94 by 94 ft (29 by 29 m) brick building, a wood-framed tower 186 feet (57 m) tall with a 68 feet (21 m) in diameter "cupola" on top, and a 120 feet (37 m) shaft sunk into the ground with sixteen iron pipes driven "one length after another" 300 feet (91 m) below the shaft in order for the machine, in Tesla's words, "to have a grip on the earth so the whole of this globe can quiver". Funding problems continued to plague Wardenclyffe and by 1905–1906 most of the site's activity had to be shut down.

== Elements ==
Through the latter part of the 1890s and during the construction of Wardenclyffe, Tesla applied for patents covering the many elements that would make up his wireless system. The system he came up with was based on electrical conduction with an electrical charge being conducted through the ground and as well as through a theorized conducting layer in the atmosphere. The design consisted of a grounded Tesla coil as a resonance transformer transmitter that he thought would be able to create a displacement of Earth's electric charge by alternately charging and discharging the oscillator's elevated terminal. This would work in conjunction with a second Tesla coil used in receive mode at a distant location, also with a grounded helical resonator and an elevated terminal. He believed that the placement of a grounded resonance transformer at another point on the Earth's surface in the role of a receiver tuned to the same frequency as the transmitter would allow electric current to flow through the Earth between the two.

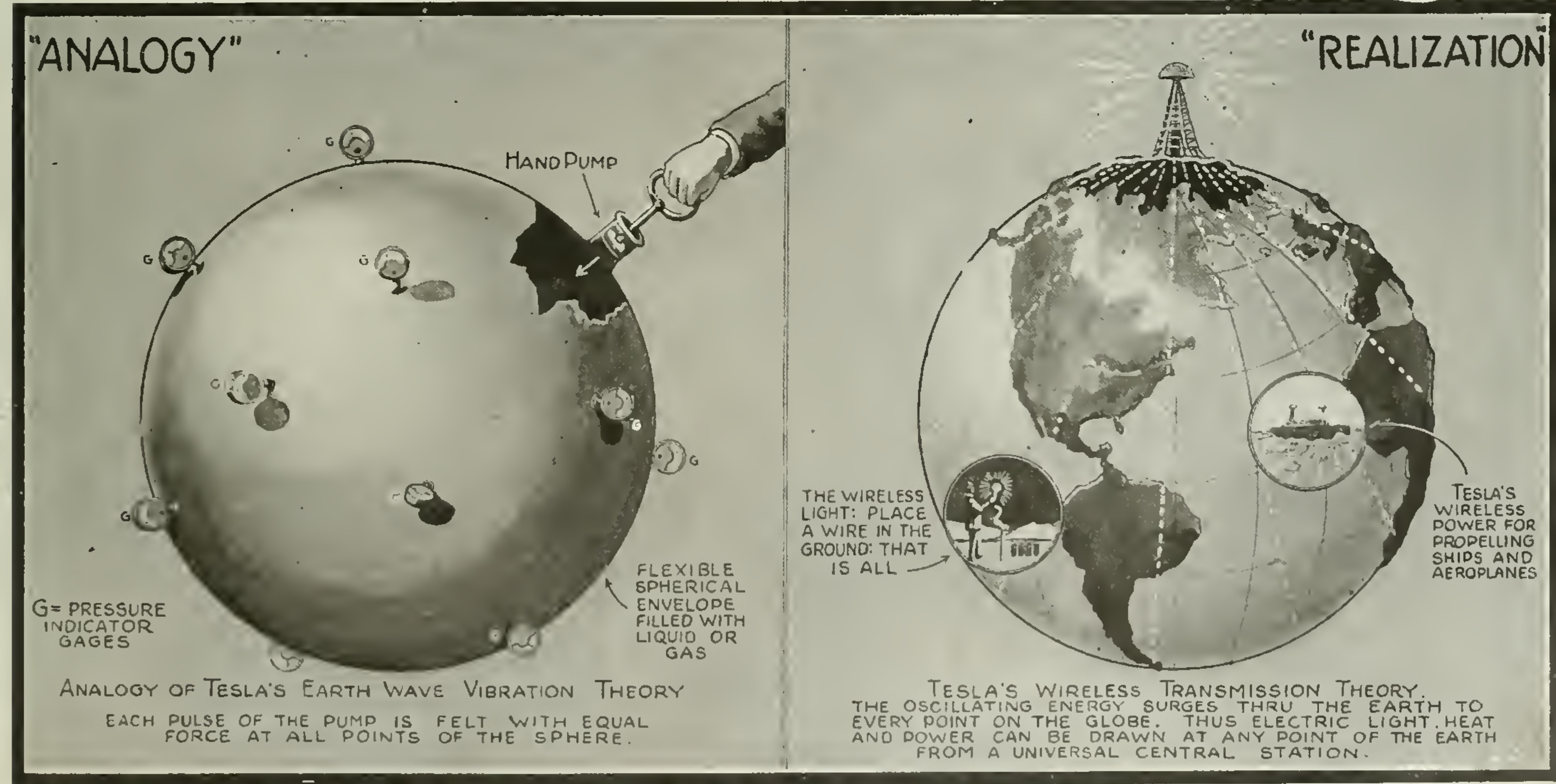
Tesla's explanation of the wireless power system in the 1919 issue of "Electrical Experimenter" with the analogy that pulsing electric power through the Earth would be similar to pumping air into a ball

He also believed waves of electric current from the sending tower could be made to reflect back from the far side of the globe, resulting in amplified stationary waves of electric current that could be utilized at any point on the globe, localizing power delivery directly to the receiving station. Another aspect of his system was electricity returned via "an equivalent electric displacement" in the atmosphere via a charged conductive upper layer that he thought existed, a theory dating back to an 1872 idea for a proposed wireless transmission-reception system developed by Mahlon Loomis. The current was thought to be usable at the receiver for telecommunications, and to drive electrical devices.

Tesla told a friend his plans included the building of more than thirty transmission-reception stations near major population centers around the world, with Wardenclyffe being the first. If plans had moved forward without interruption, the Long Island prototype would have been followed by a second plant built in the British Isles, perhaps on the west coast of Scotland near Glasgow. Each of these facilities was to include a large magnifying transmitter of a design loosely based on the apparatus assembled at the Colorado Springs experimental station in 1899.

== Claimed applications ==
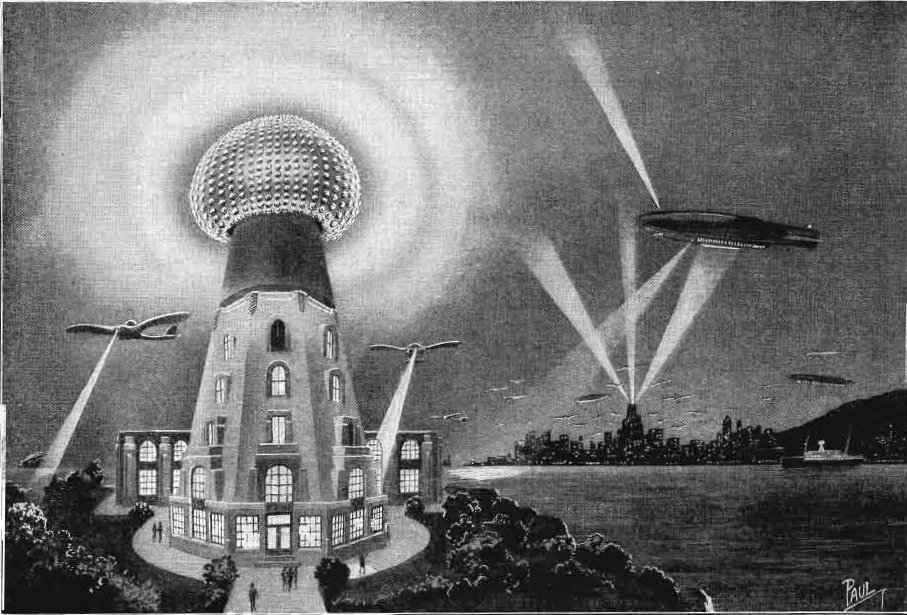
1925 artist's conception of what Tesla's wireless power transmission system might have looked like in the future, powering aircraft and lighting the city in the background.

Tesla's description of his wireless transmission ideas in 1895 includes its humanitarian uses in bringing abundant electrical energy to remote underdeveloped parts of the world, as well as fostering closer communications amongst nations. In his June, 1900 Century Magazine article "The Problem of Increasing Human Energy", he elaborated on the properties of the Earth and on the principles of a system which could use the Earth as the medium for communication and the transmission of power without wires. He wrote that communications at any distance was practicable. He also noted this same process could be used to locate maritime objects such as icebergs or ships at sea and that "electrical movement of such magnitude" could communicate with other planets.

In 1909 Tesla stated:

"It will soon be possible, for instance, for a business man in New York to dictate instructions and have them appear instantly in type in London or elsewhere. He will be able to call up from his desk and talk with any telephone subscriber in the world. It will only be necessary to carry an inexpensive instrument not bigger than a watch, which will enable its bearer to hear anywhere on sea or land for distances of thousands of miles. One may listen or transmit speech or song to the uttermost parts of the world."

He also held beliefs that high potential electric current flowing through the upper atmosphere could make it glow, providing night time lighting for transoceanic shipping lanes.

He elaborated on World Wireless in his 1919 Electrical Experimenter article titled "The True Wireless", detailing its ability for long range telecommunications and putting forward his view that the prevailing theory of radio wave propagation was inaccurate.

"The Hertz wave theory of wireless transmission may be kept up for a while, but I do not hesitate to say that in a short time it will be recognized as one of the most remarkable and inexplicable aberrations of the scientific mind which has ever been recorded in history."

== Feasibility ==
Tesla's demonstrations of wireless power transmission at Colorado Springs consisted of lighting incandescent electric lamps positioned nearby the structure housing his large experimental magnifying transmitter, with ranges out to 1,938 feet (591 m) from the transmitter. There is little direct evidence of his having transmitted power beyond these photographically documented demonstrations. He would claim afterwards that he had "carried on practical experiments in wireless transmission". He believed that he had achieved Earth electrical resonance that, according to his theory, would produce electrical effects at any terrestrial distance.

There have been varied claims over the years regarding Tesla's accomplishments with his wireless system. His own notes from Colorado Springs are unclear as to whether he was ever successful at long-range transmission. Tesla made a claim in a 1916 statement to attorney Drury W. Cooper that in 1899, he collected quantitative transmission-reception data at a distance of about 10 miles (16 km). Tesla biographer John J. O'Neill made a claim in his 1944 book Prodigal Genius: The life of Nikola Tesla that in 1899 at Colorado Springs, Tesla lit 200 incandescent lamps at a distance of 26 miles (42 km).

Scientist and engineers working in the field note that Tesla's ideas of transmitting large amounts of power long range would never have worked since he generally misunderstood the physics involved, over-estimated the conductivity of the Earth and the atmosphere, and vastly underestimated the loss of power over distance.

== Related patents ==
- SYSTEM OF ELECTRIC LIGHTING, April 25, 1891, U.S. patent 454,622, June 23, 1891.
- MEANS FOR GENERATING ELECTRIC CURRENTS, August 2, 1893, U.S. patent 514,168, February 6, 1894.
- ELECTRICAL TRANSFORMER, March 20, 1897, U.S. patent 593,138, November 2, 1897.
- METHOD AND APPARATUS FOR CONTROLLING MECHANISM OF MOVING VESSEL OR VEHICLES, July 1, 1898, U.S. patent 613,809 November 8, 1898.
- SYSTEM OF TRANSMISSION OF ELECTRICAL ENERGY, September 2, 1897, U.S. patent 645,576, March 20, 1900.
- APPARATUS FOR TRANSMISSION OF ELECTRICAL ENERGY, September 2, 1897, U.S. patent 649,621, May 15, 1900.
- METHOD OF INTENSIFYING AND UTILIZING EFFECTS TRANSMITTED THROUGH NATURAL MEDIA, June 24, 1899, U.S. patent 685,953, November 5, 1901.
- METHOD OF UTILIZING EFFECTS TRANSMITTED THROUGH NATURAL MEDIA, August 1, 1899, U.S. patent 685,954, November 5, 1901.
- APPARATUS FOR UTILIZING EFFECTS TRANSMITTED FROM A DISTANCE TO A RECEIVING DEVICE THROUGH NATURAL MEDIA, June 24, 1899, U.S. patent 685,955, November 5, 1901.
- APPARATUS FOR UTILIZING EFFECTS TRANSMITTED THROUGH NATURAL MEDIA, March 21, 1900, U.S. patent 685,956, November 5, 1901.
- METHOD OF SIGNALING, July 16, 1900, U.S. patent 723,188, March 17, 1903.
- SYSTEM OF SIGNALING, July 16, 1900, U.S. patent 725,605, April 14, 1903.
- ART OF TRANSMITTING ELECTRICAL ENERGY THROUGH THE NATURAL MEDIUMS, May 16, 1900, U.S. patent 787,412, April 18, 1905.
- ART OF TRANSMITTING ELECTRICAL ENERGY THROUGH THE NATURAL MEDIUMS, April 17, 1906, Canadian Patent 142,352, August 13, 1912.
- APPARATUS FOR TRANSMITTING ELECTRICAL ENERGY, January 18, 1902, U.S. patent 1,119,732, December 1, 1914.

== See also ==
- Wireless energy transmission
- Surface plasmon
- Surface-wave-sustained mode
- Transmission medium
- Distributed generation
- Electricity distribution
- Electric power transmission

Apparatus

- Electric generator
- Isochronous electro-mechanical oscillator
- Tesla coil
- Magnifying Transmitter
