= Violet ray =

Antique medical appliance

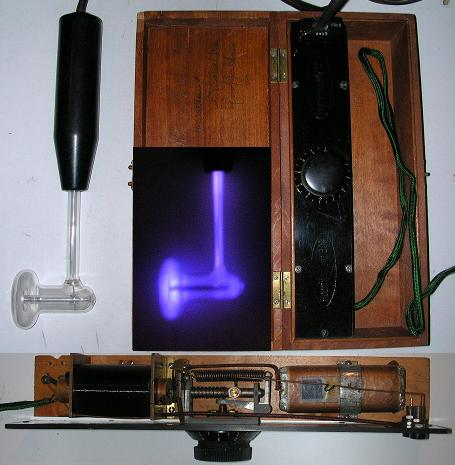
Antique violet ray set with glass electrode (left) and control box. When energized, the glass emitted a violet glow (inset, center)

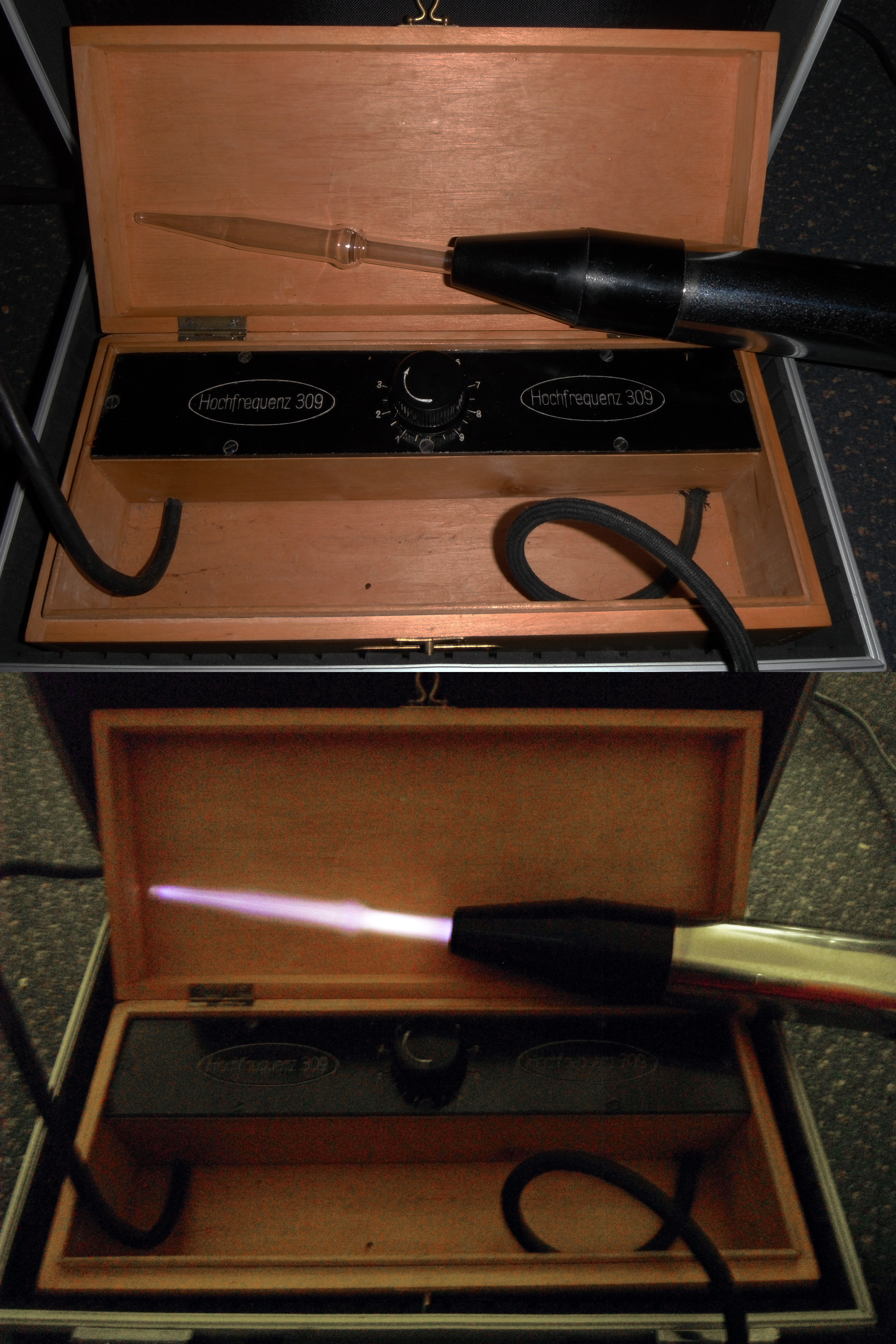
Another electrode used with the same set.

A violet ray is an antique medical appliance used during the early 20th century to discharge in electrotherapy. Their construction usually featured a disruptive discharge coil with an interrupter to apply a high voltage, high frequency, low current to the human body for therapeutic purposes.

== Overview ==
Nikola Tesla introduced his first prototype violet ray at the World's Columbian Exposition in 1893. Most of the antique violet rays in the US were produced before the Depression era, and some of the larger US manufacturers of violet rays were Renulife, Fitzgerald, and Fisher. Companies who manufactured violet ray devices made many other types of electrical appliances as well, e.g. Star Electric, which also manufactured stock ticker machines. Many of the companies who were able to continue manufacturing violet rays after the Depression stopped making them due to World War II, when they began manufacturing radio coils and other electrical components for the war instead.

A typical violet ray device consisted of an ungrounded, electrical control box that controlled the interrupter and housed the magneto coil, and an attached bakelite or other handle housing which contained the high voltage coil and an insertion port for attachments. Glass, evacuated tubes of varying shapes and for different therapeutic uses could be inserted into the bakelite handle to apply the resulting current to different parts of the body.

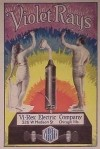
Colorful cover of Virex manual with recommended violet ray treatments for various diseases and conditions, about 1900.

Violet ray treatments were said to cure everything from lower back pain to carbuncles. From an antique Master Violet Ray manual c. 1920 comes this treatment advice:

Brain Fog - Use Applicator No. I over forehead and eyes. Also treat the back of head and neck with strong current in direct contact with the skin. Treat the spine and hold the electrode in the hand. Ozone inhalations for about four minutes are also of importance.

For catarrh, this treatment was directed:

Catarrh, Nasal - In this condition the Nasal Tube is used within the nose with a mild current within the nasal passage, two to five minutes on each side, followed by an application with the Surface Electrode externally over the area of the nose. Use Ozone Generator.

== Legal actions ==
During the 1940s and 1950s, makers of violet ray devices were subjected to numerous lawsuits and multiple actions by the US government including recalls, seizures, forfeitures, and orders to have them destroyed.

The last manufacturer of violet ray electrotherapy devices in the US was Master Electric. The company was subjected to a 1951 lawsuit in Marion, Indiana, and the devices were seized by the FDA. While their manufacture was prohibited in the US by case law, violet ray electrotherapy devices are still manufactured by companies outside of the US.

== Other uses ==
Jon Burge of the Chicago Police Department, who was dismissed in 1992 following allegations of torture of suspects by Burge and detectives working under him in the 1970s and 1980s, may have used a violet ray. The violet ray was suggested independently by two museum curators after they were given victims' descriptions of one of the several electrical devices used by Burge.

American clairvoyant Edgar Cayce advocated use of the violet ray in almost 900 of his readings.

Since the 1990s, under the name "violet wand", violet ray devices have more recently become popular as relatively safe electrical stimulation devices for erotic electrostimulation.

== See also ==
- Transcutaneous electrical nerve stimulation
