= List of Street & Smith publications =

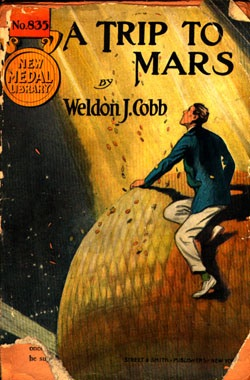
Trip to Mars from 1915

The following is a list of publications from Street & Smith.

== "Slick" magazines ==
- Mademoiselle
- Mademoiselle Living (1947–1949) becomes:
- Living (1949–1959) continues by Conde Nast
- The Popular Magazine
- Air Trails Magazine later Air Trails Pictorial and Air Trails and Science Frontiers
- Air Progress
- Picture Play (1915–1941)
- Charm (1941–1959)

== Anthology series ==
- Tip Top Library
- New Medal Library

== Adventure ==
- Air Trails
- All-Around Magazine
- Bill Barnes Air Adventures
- Do and Dare Weekly
- Movie Action Magazine
- New Story Magazine
- Pete Rice Magazine
- Red Raven Library
- Sea Stories Magazine
- The Skipper
- The Wizard
- Tiptop Weekly
- Top-Notch Magazine

== Detective and mystery ==
- Clues
- Crime Busters
- Detective Story Magazine
- The Avenger
- Doc Savage
- Mystery Story Magazine
- Nick Carter Weekly
- Old Broadbrim Weekly
- The Shadow
- The Whisperer

== General fiction ==
- People's

== Romance ==
- Love Story Magazine
- Romance Range

== Science fiction and fantasy ==
- Astounding Stories
- A Trip To Mars (1915)
- Unknown
- The Thrill Book (1919)

== Sports ==
- Street & Smith's Sports Annual
- All-Sports Library
- Athlete
- NASCAR Scene
- Sport Story Magazine

== Westerns ==
- Cowboy Stories
- Buffalo Bill Border Stories
- Buffalo Bill Stories
- Far West Stories
- Far West Romances
- Pete Rice Magazine
- True Western Stories
- Western Story Magazine
- Wild West Weekly

== Young adult fiction ==
- The Boys of the World
- Bowery Boy Weekly
- Good News
- Live Girl Stories
- My Queen

== Comic books ==
- Air Ace (20 issues, 1944–48)
- Army and Navy Comics (5 issues, 1940–42; became Supersnipe)
- Bill Barnes Comics (1 issues, 1940; became Bill Barnes, America's Air Ace)
- Bill Barnes, America's Air Ace (11 issues, 1941–43; became Air Ace)
- Blackstone, Master Magician Comics (3 issues, 1946)
- Devil Dog Comics (1 issue, 1942)
- Doc Savage Comics (20 issues, 1940–43)
- Ghost Breakers (2 issues, 1948)
- Pioneer Picture-Stories (9 issues, 1941–43)
- Red Dragon Comics (5 issues, 1943–44; 7 issues, 1947–49)
- The Shadow Comics (101 issues, 1940–48)
- Sport Comics (4 issues, 1940, became True Sports)
- Super-Magic Comics (1 issues, became Super-Magician)
- Super-Magician Comics (55 issues, 1941–43)
- Supersnipe Comics (44 issues, 1942–49)
- Top Secrets (10 issues, 1947–49)
- Trail Blazers (4 issues, 1941–42, became Red Dragon)
- True Sport Picture Stories (46 issues, 1942–49)
