= People's Magazine =

US literary magazine (1906–1924)

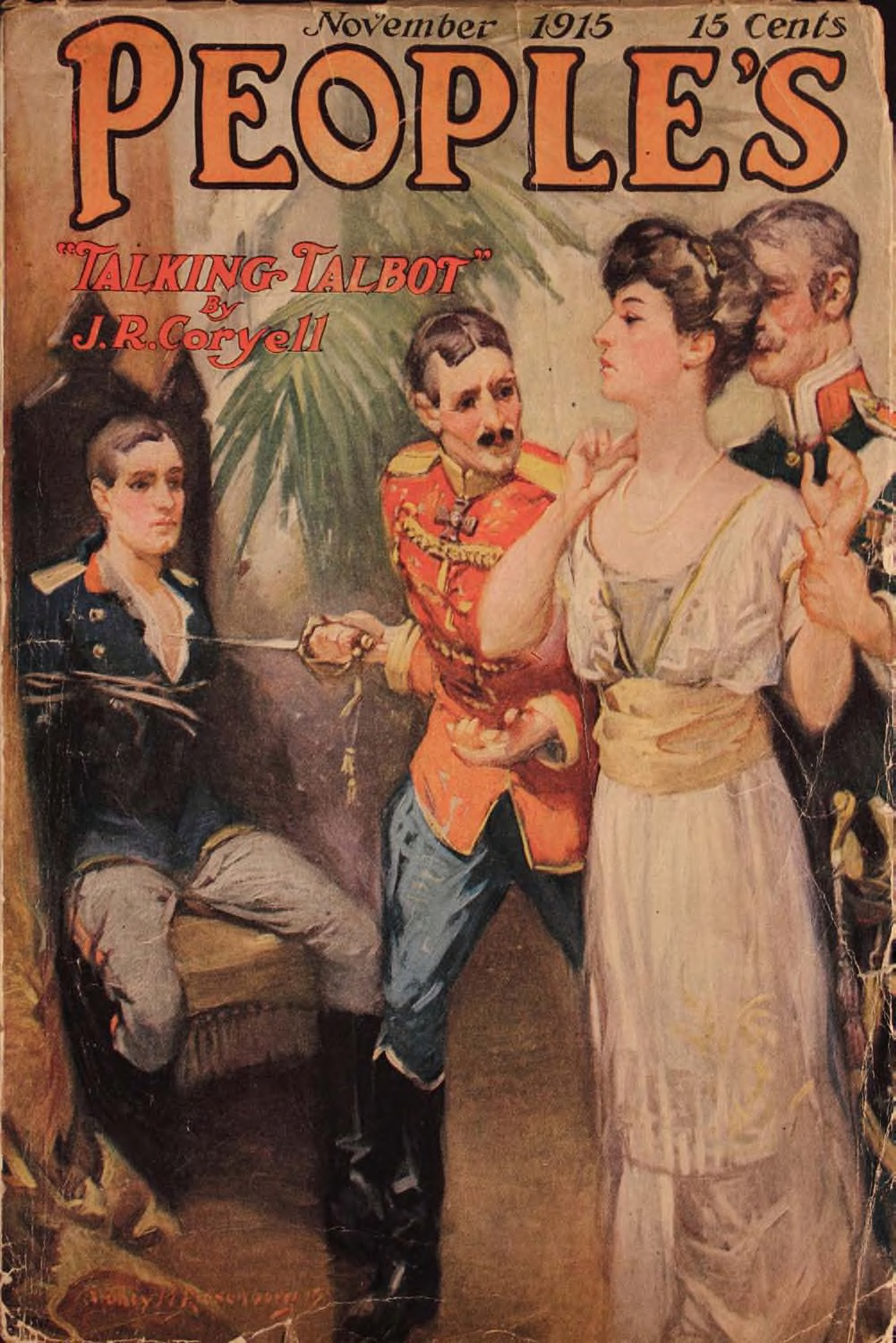
November 1915 issue, featuring a story by John R. Coryell and art by Sidney H. Riesenberg

People's Magazine, also known as People's or People's Story Magazine, was an American literary magazine that was published from 1906 to 1924.

People's Magazine was first published in July 1906 by Street & Smith in New York City. This first issue contained fiction, articles, and poems. The intent of People's was to be a companion to the literary magazine The Popular Magazine. It was later published by Lily, Wait & Co.

When the magazine was first published, it contained both previously published and new material. Contents included the reprinting of work previously written by notable poets and essayists. In November 1906, the magazine announced that it would no longer contain reprinted material. From the magazine's December issue onward, People's published only original and copyrighted material.

From 1906 to 1909, the magazine was edited by Archibald Lowery Sessions, who succeeded Lee D. Brown. In 1909, John W. Harding became editor of the magazine. It was advertised as offering instructive and amusing literature.

In 1921, the magazine became an all-fiction publication and no longer accepted articles or illustrations. At the time, Sessions was editor of the magazine. The following text was written in The Writer about what the magazine was looking for:

The present special needs of the magazine are for short stories of about 5,000 words, complete novels from 30,000 to 40,000 words, and serials from 50,000 words upward. Almost any kind of story that has well developed dramatic interest, movement, and a distinct human note, is welcomed, but the type of fiction preferred in general is stories of outdoor adventure. Love stories, or so-called sex stories, psychological stories or character studies, ghost stories, or stories that are conventional in conception, or mechanical in execution, are not wanted. The editor is especially interested in the work of new authors, because, he says, experience leads him to believe that very often new authors have something new to say, or, at least, something to say from a new point of view.

— The Writer, Volume 33 (1921)

Notable contributors to People's included Clinton H. Stagg, Albert Payson Terhune, Ellis Parker Butler, Eden Phillpotts, Alfred Damon Runyon, Zoe Anderson Norris, and H. Bedford-Jones.

People's Magazine ceased publication in 1924 after 279 issues.

== See also ==
- People (magazine)
