= Robert McBlair =

American author (1888–1976)

Robert McBlair (1888–1976) was a novelist and poet in the United States. He wrote pulp fiction stories published in various magazines and a novel about a negatively stereotyped African American man in the south. His stories helped propagate negative stereotypes of African Americans.

He was from Virginia and lived in New York. He married Gretchen Frick of Janesville, Wisconsin.

His novel Mister Fish Kelly was described as offering a darker side of Norfolk, stealthy humor, and "darky dialect". The book was described as depicting "Negro life" accurately but humorously.

McBlair also wrote poetry.

== Works ==
- "After Thirty Years", Black Cat magazine
- Mister Fish Kelly; a novel, D. Appleton and Company, New York (1924), from stories published in The Popular Magazine
- Black Gold
- The Hanging of Cabell Braxton (1930)
