= Grey Seal (disambiguation) =

Grey seal could refer to"

- Grey seal - an aquatic mammal
- Grey Seal (song) - an Elton John song
- Jimmie Dale - a.k.a. "The Grey Seal", a literary character and proto-superhero created in 1914 by Frank L. Packard
