= Coryell =

Coryell may refer to:

== People ==
- Coryell (surname), includes a list of people with the surname
- Coryell Judie (born 1987), American football cornerback

== Others ==
- Coryell (album), a 1969 album of Larry Coryell
- Coryell County, Texas, U.S.
