= Edmond Lawrence =

Edmond Lawrence may refer to

- Lemuel de Bra, or Edmond Lawrence (1884–1954) American short story writer
- Edmund Lawrence (basketball) (1952–2015), American sportsman
