= John R. Coryell =

American crime writer (1851–1924)

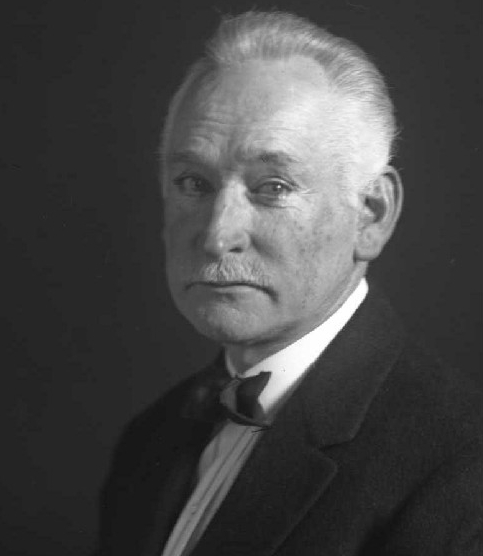
- Born: John Russell Coryell; December 15, 1851; New York City
- Died: July 15, 1924 (aged 72); Readfield, Maine
- Occupation: Author
- Known for: Creator of fictional detective Nick Carter; co-creator of the first-person confessional magazine format with True Story

John Russell Coryell (December 15, 1851, in New York City – July 15, 1924, in Readfield, Maine) was an American dime novel author. He wrote under the Nicholas Carter and Bertha M. Clay house pseudonyms, and, like many of his fellow dime novelists under many other pseudonyms, including Tyman Currio, Lillian R. Drayton, Julia Edwards, Geraldine Fleming, Margaret Grant, Barbara Howard, Harry Dubois Milman, Milton Quarterly, and Lucy May Russell.

== Biography ==
=== Background and early life ===
According to Coryell's son Russell, "The Coryell family was descended from French Huguenots driven out of France. They settled early in America. One ancestor, a Coryell, was a pall-bearer to Washington." However, recent DNA testing has revealed that the Coryells are descended from the Sephardic Jewish Curiel family, and specifically from Jacob Curiel (1587-1664).

John R. Coryell was educated in NYC public schools and city college. In 1869, he abandoned the study of law (presumably at Harvard) to join his father, who was building battleships for the Chinese government. John R. Coryell underwent an arduous sea voyage to China. At age twenty, he became a magistrate in the Shanghai civil courts.

After returning from China, Coryell set up a ship-brokerage business in San Francisco and lost his fortune. He was recruited to Santa Barbara by publisher Harrison Gray Otis to write for the Santa Barbara Press, though Coryell admitted, “I was a mighty poor newspaper man.”

=== Family ===
In 1875, after returning from China, Coryell met his future wife, Abby Lydia Hedge (1858-1957).

Following a seven-year engagement, the couple married on December 7, 1882. They had four sons: Harold Hedge Coryell (1884-1948), Roland Smith Coryell (1886-1957), Hubert Vansant Coryell (1889-1979), and Russell Miers Coryell (1891-1941). All four attended Harvard University. Following in their father's footsteps, Hubert V. Coryell and Russell M. Coryell both became successful writers.

=== Early writing career ===
John R. Coryell's freelance writing career coincided with his marriage. His early works break into two main categories: popular science articles for Scientific American; and juvenile fiction for St. Nicholas. His first known published work was “The Great Tumble Weed of the Prairies” in the December 2, 1882 issue of Scientific American. Meanwhile, Coryell moved his family to Brooklyn.

=== Nick Carter ===
Coryell was related to the Smith family of New York publisher Street & Smith. His uncle was Francis S. Smith and his cousin was Ormond Smith. Francis S. Smith asked Coryell whether he could write fiction in the style of dime novelist Ned Buntline. Coryell welcomed the opportunity because, with his new family, his juvenile stories were “not sufficiently lucrative.” Coryell boasted to Ormond Smith that “he could write better detective yarns than any of their established writers. The result was a novel, The American Marquis, or, Detective for Vengeance: A Story of a Masked Bride and a Husband's Quest, bylined “Nicholas Carter.” The proceeds covered the birth expenses for the Coryells’ first son, Harold.

His second novel featured Nick Carter as the detective-protagonist and was also bylined Nicholas Carter. The Old Detective's Pupil; or, The Mysterious Crime of Madison Square, was serialized in thirteen consecutive issues of the New York Weekly, the first dated September 18, 1886. Coryell penned four more Nick Carter stories and then the series was taken over by Frederick Van Rensselaer Dey. Nick Carter became a legendary fictional character with Street & Smith producing new Nick Carter stories into the 1930s.

The creation of the famous fictional detective was frequently attributed to other writers who had authored Nick Carter stories. These claims were made not by the authors but after their deaths. They include: Frederick Van Rensselaer Dey, Eugene T. Sawyer, Thomas C. Harbaugh, George C. Jenks, and Frederick W. Davis.

Coryell was embarrassed by his background in dime novels and concealed his authorship of Nick Carter from his sons. When they discovered in their attic clippings from the New York Weekly featuring Nick Carter, their father swore them to secrecy. Coryell did admit in 1915, though, that “The creation of the now famous Nick Carter was one of my greatest successes.”

Beginning with his Nick Carter stories, most of Coryell's work was published pseudonymously. Many novels were written under the name “Bertha M. Clay.” This had been the penname of English writer Charlotte M. Brame (1836–84). She died leaving a novel uncompleted. Coryell was asked to finish it by Street & Smith, Brame's publisher. They were so pleased with the result they asked him to continue writing stories as Bertha M. Clay. His contract called for a million words a year; he often wrote six different novels simultaneously. Coryell estimated that he wrote over two hundred novels. Since there were about four hundred Bertha M. Clay novels, few if any of Coryell's contributions have been positively identified.

=== Macfadden Publications ===
In the early century, Coryell began a long relationship with fitness and health guru Bernarr Macfadden and his Macfadden Publications. Coryell's first known connection was his article “Prurient Prudes,” in the September 1902 issue of Macfadden's magazine Physical Culture. Coryell would appear in the magazine at least a hundred times, with both fiction and nonfiction. Nonfiction pieces often appeared under the byline H. Mitchell Watchet.

An early science fiction novel, The Weird and Wonderful Story of Another World, appeared under the byline Tyman Currio, and was serialized in twelve installments from October 1905 through September 1906.

Based on an idea from Bernarr Macfadden, Coryell wrote the novel Wild Oats, or Growing to Manhood in a Civilized (?) Society, which began serialization in the October 1906 Physical Culture. The story, which contained lessons about the dangers of “sexual ignorance,” eventually appeared in six parts, creating a scandal along the way. Macfadden was arrested on a federal warrant and charged with sending lewd and obscene matter through the mails. He was convicted in a jury trial. The sentence was upheld at every level including the U.S. Supreme Court. However, Macfadden was pardoned by President Taft.

Another momentous collaboration occurred in 1919. Macfadden and Coryell developed the model of the first-person confessional story and created True Story to bring it to the public. The magazine was extremely successful and added a significant new theme to magazine publishing. As the magazine progressed, Coryell “helped spot the real stories, the good stories, and weed out the phonies and the frauds.” With the advent of True Story, Coryell became a permanent member of the Macfadden editorial staff.

=== Anarchism and beliefs ===
Coryell was active in social causes, though there is limited remaining evidence of his participation. Fulton Oursler, Macfadden's editor-in-chief who Coryell helped hire, described his benefactor as “a brave and radical thinker . . . actively engaged in many political campaigns of a liberal character.” Expanding upon his earlier remarks, Oursler wrote: “In the course of his life [Coryell] had been a Socialist, embraced the Anarchist philosophy, and finally came through all the isms to believe in tolerance as the greatest and most difficult goal of the race.”

Coryell frequently lectured on his beliefs, for instance his advocacy of free marriage and free divorce.

He was a close friend of anarchist Emma Goldman. He was an early and frequent contributor to Goldman's journal, Mother Earth (using the penname Margaret Grant). On January 6, 1907, Coryell presided at an anarchists’ organizational meeting attended by Goldman and Alexander Berkman, and intended as a fundraiser for Mother Earth. Goldman's speech on "Misconceptions of Anarchism" led police to break up the meeting with Berkman urging the crowd to disobey. Goldman was arrested for "uttering incendiary remarks from a public platform"; Coryell and Berkman were held as accessories. All were released for lack of evidence. In 1911, Coryell and his wife Abby were the inaugural teachers at the Modern School, founded by Goldman and Berkman. Coryell described the school as "radical in the method of teaching, but not radical in the things taught."

=== Death and legacy ===
Coryell died at his summer home in Readfield, Maine while still in the employ of Macfadden Publications. According to Macfadden editor Lyon Mearson, “He died while reading a manuscript.” Fulton Oursler wrote: “John was my close friend until the summer of 1924, when he typed the last sentence of the last installment of his last serial and quietly died in his chair.”

Of his literary dimensions, Harold Hersey, who had serialized Coryell's Strasbourg Rose in Street & Smith's The Thrill Book, wrote: “I recall him as a man with a kindly soul, a patient, balanced mind, and with an imagination that had created thousands of characters, thousands of situations and thousands of plots.” Oursler noted that “Nothing offended him so much as an attempt at ‘fine writing.’ Simplicity was his literary god, and he had the ability to write stories that anyone, learned or illiterate, could pick up and enjoy.” Editor and publisher F. Orlin Tremaine, who began at Macfadden during Coryell's final years, wrote that “he taught me more about stories, simplicity of approach, and the technique of modern writing than any other person, before or since.”

Coryell has something of an inverted legacy. He was a creator or co-creator of two highly influential publishing initiatives. He became famous for creating Nick Carter, for which he had only limited involvement. Conversely, he is virtually unrecognized for his significant role in developing the first-person confessional which became a powerful force in magazine publishing.

== Selected bibliography ==
=== Novels ===
Feuilleton/serial novels

- Le Marquis français ou détective par vengeance, New York Weekly (1884)

Novels

Nick Carter series

- The Old Detective's Pupil (1887)
- A Wall Street Haul (1887)
- Fighting Against Millions (1888)
- The Crime of a Contess (1888)
- A Titled Counterfeiter (1888)
- A Woman's Head (1888)

Non-Nick Carter novels

- Diego Pinzon (1892)
- Diccon the Bold (1893)
- The Hound of Marat (1915)
- The Blue Rose (1916)
- Strasbourg Rose serialized in four parts, 1919

Novellas

- How Sin Hop Went Ashore (1882)
- The Largest Pet in the World (1883)
- The Midget Sheep (1883)
- Snow-Shoes and No Shoes (1883)
- A Submarine Fire-Eater (1883)
- Pigmy Trees and Miniature Landscapes (1884), in collaboration with James Carter Beard
- The Spider and the Tuning Fork (1884)
- Swordsmen of the Deep (1884)
- The Romance of the Menagerie (1884), in collaboration with James Carter Beard
- Baby Deb "P'ays" for the Christmas Goose (1885)
- Cased in Armor (1885)
- Honey Hunters (1885)
- The Rajah's Paper Cutter (1885)
- The King of the Frozen North (1886)
- Savage and Cowardly (1886)
- St. Nicholas Dog Stories - A Clever Little Yellow Dog (1886)
- Wild Hunters (1886)
- A Scheming Old Santa Claus (1886)
- The Strange Doings of the Kiwi (1887)
- Elephants at Work (1887)
- Lassoing a Sea-Lion (1889)
- Sweet Memories (1889)
- Jokers of the Menagerie (1889)
- Wolves of the Sea (1890)
- A Rat's Cheveux de Frise (1890)
- Sallie Drew's Vocation (1914)
- A Modern Gulliver's Travels (1915)
- Talking Talbot (1915)
- The Bundle of Bonds (1916)
- The Gilded Eros (1917)
- Dorothy Meade's Problem (1917)
- The Blotted Combinaison (1918)
- Stenographer of Wife? (1922)
- The Dragon's Eye (1922)
- The Girl is in the Main Thing (1923)
- What Chance Has a Mere Husband Against a Poodle? (1923)
- The Girl Who Found Her Own Soul (1923)
- A Factory Girl's Romance (1924)

=== Physical Culture articles and fiction ===
- "Fruit Drinks for Summer Use," August 1905 [as H. Mitchell Watchet]
- "The Arrest and Trial of the Editor," June 1906 [as H. Mitchell Watchet]
- Wild Oats, or Growing to Manhood in a Civilized (?) Society, October 1906 to March 1907
- "Physical Culture Crusade Against White Flour," March 1909 [as H. Mitchell Watchet]
- "Can We Suppress Sex?" August 1914
- "Love and Marriage 100 Years from Now," March 1922 to September 1922
- " 'Knock-Out' Riley," January 1924

=== Scientific American articles ===
- "The Chinese Junk". Scientific American. 4 (8). 25 August 1883.
- "The Termite Pest of the Old World". Scientific American. 5 (10). 8 September 1888.
- "The Glyptodon". Scientific American. 5 (15). 13 October 1888.
- "The Florida Manatee". Scientific American. 5 (18). 3 November 1888.
- "The Great Tumble Weed of the Prairies". Scientific American. 47 (23). 2 December 1882.
- "Gulling the Pelican". Scientific American. 48 (22). 2 June 1883.
- "A Sheep Destroyer". Scientific American. 51 (19). 8 November 1884.
- "The California Roadrunner". Scientific American. 54 (4). 23 January 1886.
- "The Zarabatana of the Macoushies". Scientific American. 55 (8). 21 August 1886.

=== Other nonfiction ===
- "Marriage and the Home," Mother Earth, April 1906

== See also ==
- Nick Carter (literary character)
