= Russell M. Coryell =

- Born: Russell Miers Coryell; December 28, 1891; Cornwall, New York
- Died: October 16, 1941 (aged 49); Freeport, New York
- Occupation: Author
- Known for: Son of John R. Coryell; journalist and popular romance fiction author
- Spouse: Lella Franchin (m. 1920)

Russell Miers Coryell (December 28, 1891, in Cornwall, New York – October 16, 1941, in Freeport, New York) was a teacher, writer, and, in the last decade of his life, a popular author of romance serials for the Street & Smith love pulps. He was the fourth son of dime novelist John R. Coryell.

== Biography ==
Russell, like his three brothers, attended Harvard University, class of 1914, but he dropped out after one year, finding “the academic life pretentious and uninspiring.” In the following two years, he served in a variety of odd jobs, from mechanic to department store clerk to bellhop. He was athletic and, like his father, an advocate of physical culture. He made money as a swimming instructor, posing nude for artists, and training Welsh boxing champion Freddie Welsh.

In the summer of 1912, he lived with poet Robinson Jeffers in Santa Barbara. Coryell served as society editor of the Santa Barbara Independent. From 1913 to 1916, he was a professor of English and art at Boyland, an experimental boarding school in Santa Barbara. He also claimed to have prospected for gold in the Sierra Nevadas and been a cowboy.

After Santa Barbara, he relocated to Europe. He described his occupations as: “war correspondent to the Los Angeles Times, English Professor at Milan, Genoa, and Paris,” and an “advertising manager of a Paris newspaper.” From 1916 to 1920, he was a ship chandler at the ports of Genoa and Trieste. In Trieste, on April 20, 1920, he married a Venetian woman, Lella Franchin. He soon became manager of the Adriatic Marine Supply Company in the disputed Free State of Fiume (now Croatia), under the occupation of Italian poet Gabriele D'Annunzio. In December, during the “Bloody Christmas” actions, the couple, like other Americans, was forced to leave Fiume, with D’Annunzio himself writing across Coryell's passport: “He leaves Fiume forever to return to his own country.”

Their return may not have been immediate, as Coryell claims to have spent six years abroad. At any rate, the couple relocated to Maine where John R. Coryell had a summer home, and Russell began his writing career. He wrote numerous articles on child rearing and early education. In his early writing career, he published some works under the penname Franklin Holt. His most lucrative work went to the two publishers that his father had been most associated with, Macfadden Publications and Street & Smith. The best known part of his career was a series of romance serials he published from 1934 to 1941 in Street & Smith pulps like Love Story Magazine and Smart Love Stories.

He died on October 16, 1941, after a short illness.

== Selected bibliography ==
=== Fiction ===
- On the Dark Trail, Scribner's Magazine, July 1928 (as Franklin Holt)
- Manhattan Marriage, Ainslee's, December 1934 – February 1935
- To-morrow's Revenge, Ainslee’s Smart Love Stories, October 1935 – January 1936
- Eugenic Island, Ainslee’s Smart Love Stories, June–September 1936
- Through the Shadows, Smart Love Stories, December 1936 – March 1937
- Changeling Wife, Smart Love Stories, June–September 1937
- Daytime Bride, Love Story Magazine, March 5–26, 1938
- Society Brat, Love Story Magazine, October 14 - November 4, 1939
- Forgotten Island, Love Story Magazine, November 23 - December 14, 1940
- Wings Over Hollywood, Love Story Magazine, August 2–30, 1941
- Outlaw Love, Romantic Range, November–December 1941

=== Nonfiction ===
- "A Chimney Swift's Nest," St. Nicholas, September 1905
- The Mad Mystic and the American Beauty, True Strange Stories, March–October 1929 (as Franklin Holt)
- "The Birth of Nick Carter," The Bookman, July 1929 (biography of John R. Coryell)
- "Our Educational Cruelty to Children," Physical Culture, May 1935
