= Nick Whiffles =

Fictional character

Nick Whiffles is a fictional American frontier character which first appeared in a serial by John Hovey Robinson (1820–1867) published in Street & Smith's New York Weekly from June 5 to September 11, 1858. It was also adapted into a melodramatic play which became the most widely-played frontier play prior to the American Civil War.

Subsequent Whiffles stories followed including Mountain Max; or Nick Whiffles on the Border: A Tale of the Bushwackers in Missouri (1861), which inserted Whiffles into a Civil War story, and two serials published in the New York Sunday Mercury in 1859 and 1862. After Robinson's death, Edward S. Ellis contributed two Whiffles stories for pulp publisher Beadle and Adams in 1871 and 1873 under the pseudonym J.F.C. Adams.

== Bibliography ==
- Nick Whiffles or The Trapper Guide: A Tale of the North West (New York Weekly serial 1858)
- Pathaway, or the Mountain Outlaws (New York Sunday Mercury 1859), later published as Nick Whiffles, the Old Trapper of the Nor'West
- Mountain Max; or Nick Whiffles on the Border: A Tale of the Bushwackers in Missouri (1861)
- Les trappeurs de la Baie d'Hudson (1858)
