= Coryell (surname) =

Coryell is a surname. Notable people with the name include:

- Charles D. Coryell (1912–1971), American chemist
- Don Coryell (1924–2010), American football coach
- Hubert V. Coryell (1889–1979), American author
- John R. Coryell (1851–1924), American dime novel author
- Julian Coryell (born 1973), American singer, songwriter, guitarist, and producer
- Larry Coryell (1943–2017), American jazz fusion guitarist
- Murali Coryell (born 1969), American blues guitarist and singer
