= Lemuel de Bra =

American short story writer

Lemuel Lawrence de Bra (December 10, 1884 – August 24, 1954) was an American author, mostly of short stories.

While working for the Bureau of Internal Revenue and later the Secret Service in California, de Bra wrote adventure stories for boys as Edmond Lawrence, verse as L. L. de Bra, and grown-up stories, often about the Chinese in America, as Lemuel L. de Bra and L. de Bra. He also wrote non-fiction, often related to agriculture. He made writing his main career about 1922, when he moved to Florida.

== Early life ==
The son of Lemuel Manuel de Bra and his wife Eleanor Helen Brainerd, a native of Anson, Wisconsin, de Bra was born in 1884 in Benton, Ringgold County, Iowa. A sister called Nellie was born in Blairstown, Iowa, in 1886 and died in 1888, and a brother, Francis, was born in Blairstown in 1889. Their father died in 1890. Their mother had three sons from a previous marriage, one of whom died at Chippewa Falls, Wisconsin, in 1895, aged nineteen.

De Bra's grandfather, David Debra, born in Huntingdon, Pennsylvania, died in Iowa in April 1897, aged ninety. His ancestor Jacob Dubree, Debour, Dibry, Dippery, or Dibbery, had emigrated from France to Pennsylvania in the 18th century.

== Career ==
Lemuel de Bra arrived in San Francisco at six o'clock on the evening before the 1906 earthquake. He later found this experience of disaster and human emotions valuable.

For a year, de Bra worked as an instructor for Inter-State Correspondence Schools, then joined the Bureau of Internal Revenue, in which he spent twelve years. He travelled in California and Nevada, often investigating the opium trade and other narcotics operations. After marrying in 1909, he lived for several years in Alameda, California.

His first published works of fiction were short boys' adventure books, which appeared under the pen name of Edmond Lawrence, the first, Hazzard of West Point, in 1913.

In November 1915, it was reported that after hiding in a closed wagon in a paint shop on Presidio Avenue, San Francisco, Deputy Internal Revenue Agent L. L. de Bra, together with a Deputy United States Marshal, had arrested a man called Patten for selling a quantity of morphine for $90, equivalent to $2,864 in 2025.

About 1919, de Bra left the Internal Revenue service and became a Secret Service agent in San Francisco's Chinatown. Having got to know about the local Chinese culture and crime, he began to write stories about them. In 1919 his novelette "Tears of the Poppy" appeared under his own name in The Blue Book. According to Henry Bedford-Jones, writing in This Fiction Business (1922),

"L. L. de Bra wrote some stories of Chinese life, with all the characters Chinese. Nothing just like them had ever appeared. He was advised to play safe, to alter them to suit certain magazines, to put in American characters. Like a sensible man, he chucked the advice and sent the stories to Popular, which certainly appeared to offer no market for such stuff. Popular bought them, found them novel and refreshing, and delighted its readers with them.

De Bra mentions his friendship with Bedford-Jones in "The Government Agent in Fiction" (1923).

Following the Eighteenth Amendment to the United States Constitution and the Volstead Act, prohibition arrived in the United States in January 1920, but enforcement of it was difficult. In 1920, The Stirring Rod reported that L. L. de Bra was acting prohibition director, but that a new director was likely to be appointed when the new administration took office on March 4th 1921.

By 1922, de Bra was living in Lynn Haven, Florida, where his mother had gone to live about 1916, and from there advertised in The Editor that he was selling 97 per cent of the stories he wrote and was available to help student writers.

In 1924, de Bra reviewed his decision to stop using the name of Edmond Lawrence and his choice of "Lemuel L. de Bra", noting that he had shortened this to "L. de Bra", at the request of an English publisher. "Very sorrowfully I abandoned the good old Bible name of Lemuel that my mother gave me."

Also in 1924, Doubleday reprinted the long de Bra Western story "Bandit of Devil's Own", about a US customs officer dealing with smuggling at the Mexican border, as a "Red Disc" book.

Ways That Are Wary, a collection of de Bra's short stories, was published as a book in New York in 1925, with a selection of his work up to that date, nearly all with a Chinese connection, opium, corrupt policemen, deals and double deals, and so on.

In his The Yellow Peril: Chinese Americans in American Fiction, 1850–1940 (1982), William F. Wu accuses de Bra of sensationalism about "the alleged evils of Chinatown such as torture, murder, and the disproportionate influence of the tongs". He also states that sensational fiction about the Chinatowns disappeared from mainstream fiction in the late 1920s.

During his career, de Bra published hundreds of stories, becoming well known in his day. His work appeared in The Popular Magazine, Short Stories, The Blue Book, Ellery Queen's Mystery Magazine, Breezy Story Magazine, and dozens of others, most now called pulp magazines.

== Personal life ==
On 7 October 1909, in Alameda, California, de Bra married Ida Mae Fritz (1888–1952), a native of Burbank, and in the early years of their marriage they lived in Oakland. They had three sons, Francis Lorenz, or Frank (1911), Eugene Edmond (1913), and Lemuel Warren (1915), and a daughter, Helen Lorraine (1917). Frank de Bra became a radio engineer.

A short obituary in the Panama City Pilot in February 1938 reported that Mrs. Helen Sabin had died in Lynn Haven, Florida, and that her funeral would be at the Roman Catholic church there. It noted that she left two sons, Lemuel de Bra of Lynn Haven and Frank de Bra of Detroit. A widow originally from Wisconsin, she had lived in Lynn Haven for 22 years.

At the time of the 1940 United States census, de Bra and his wife were living in Hapeville, Georgia, and in the census of 1950 they are recorded at Bailey, Lane County, Oregon.

Lemuel L. de Bra died in 1954, and he and his wife are buried with his mother in the Bayview Memorial Park, Pensacola, Florida.

== Stories as Edmond Lawrence ==
- Hazzard of West Point, or, The Making of a Soldier (New York: Street & Smith, 1913)
- Amid Crashing Hills (New York: Street & Smith, 1914)
- Buffalo Bill's fiesta; or, At outs with the Duke of Cimarron (New York: Street & Smith, 1916)
- Jungle Intrigue (New York: Street & Smith, 1926)

== Selected stories ==
- "Tears of the Poppy" by Lemuel Lawrence de Bra, novelette in The Blue Book (1919)
- "The Treasure in the Hay Mow" by Lemuel L. de Bra, Michigan Farmer and State Journal of Agriculture, October 1920
- "Ashes of Dreams" by Lemuel L. de Bra, novelette in The Blue Book Magazine, May 1920
- "Diamonds of Desire" by Lemuel L. de Bra, The Green Book Magazine, May 1921
- "The Buddha Twins" by Lemuel L. De Bra, Munsey's Magazine, 1922
- "The Clever Strategy of Foo Chan Wo, Dealer in Oriental Curios" by Lemuel L. De Bra, Munsey's Magazine, 1922
- "Ways That Are Wary" by Lemuel de Bra, The Blue Book Magazine, January 1923
- "The Ruby of Red Betrayal" by Lemuel L. de Bra, The Blue Book Magazine, June 1923
- "Branton of the Border" by Lemuel de Bra, Ace-High Magazine, August 1, 1923
- "The Purple Handbag", by Lemuel L. de Bra, The Blue Book Magazine, August 1923
- "Was It Murder?", by Lemuel L. de Bra, Argosy All-Story Weekly, October 13, 1923
- "The Bandit of Devil's Own" by Lemuel L. de Bra in Ace-High Magazine, November 1, 1923
- "When Tong Tricks Tong", by Lemuel L. de Bra, The Blue Book Magazine, December 1923
- "A Life, a Bowl of Rice", by L. de Bra, in Catharine A. Dawson Scott, Ernest Rhys, eds., Twenty-Three Stories by Twenty and Three Authors (London: Thornton Butterworth, 1924)
- "In Shanghai Alley" by Lemuel L. de Bra in Triple-X Magazine, June 1930
- "Stolen Authority" by Lemuel de Bra in Confessions of a Federal "Dick" (1930)
- "Coin of the Dead" by Lemuel L. de Bra (reprinted by Wildside Press, 2019)
- "Curse of the Knives", by Lemuel L. de Bra
- Tribe of the Tiger (1934, novella, reprinted by Black Dog Books 2004, ISBN 9781928619314)

== Short Story collections ==
- Ways that are Wary (New York: Edward J. Clode, Inc., 1925)
- Slaves of the Silver Serpent (Black Dog Books, 2002), stories from The Blue Book

== Verse ==
- "The Great Unrest", by L. L. de Bra, Michigan Farmer, vol. 140 (1913), p. 70
- "The Milker's Lament", by Lemuel L. de Bra, Farm Journal and Country Gentleman, vol. 42 (1918) p. 14
- "A March Morning", by L. L. de Bra, Farm Journal and Country Gentleman, vol. 42 (1918), p. 186

== Non-fiction ==
- "Dairymen and the Revenue Law", by L. L. de Bra, San Francisco, The Breeders Gazette, February 21, 1912, p. 457
- "Moisture Tests – Practical vs. Scientific", by L. L. de Bra, Butter, Cheese & Egg Journal, vol. 3 (1912), p. 16
- "Better Build a Better Barn" by L. L. de Bra, in The Pacific Dairy Review vol. 21 (1917), p. 5
- "The West Would Abandon the Grain Sack", by L. L. de Bra, Gas Review, vol. 10 (1917), p. 30
- "The Water Reflection Trick", by L. L. de Bra, Farm Journal, vols. 41-42 (1917), p. 658
- "Mexican Water Carriers", by L. L. de Bra, American Thresherman vol. 20 (1917), p. 38
- "African Sudan Grass-The Emergency War Forage Crop" by Lemuel L. de Bra, Scientific American, June 8, 1918
- "A Mysterious Tragedy in the Chinatown of San Francisco" by Clarence A. Locan and Lemuel L. De Bra, Munsey's Magazine, vol. 77 (1922), pp. 302–303
- "The Government Agent in Fiction by Lemuel L. de Bra, Former Government Agent", Story World and Photodramatist, vol. 5, Issues 1-5 (1923), pp. 51–53
