= Hubert V. Coryell =

- Born: Hubert Vansant Coryell; December 24, 1889; Cornwall, New York
- Died: February 1979 (aged 89); Holualoa, Hawaii
- Occupation: Author
- Known for: Son of John R. Coryell; popular author of boys’ fiction
- Spouse: Etta Verona Child (m. 1912)
- Children: Hubert Vansant, Jr., Margaret Fox, Roger Hall

Hubert Vansant Coryell (December 24, 1889, in Cornwall, New York – February 1979, in Holualoa, Hawaii) was a teacher, author, and popular author of boys’ fiction. He was the third son of legendary dime novelist John R. Coryell.

Like his three brothers, Hubert V. Coryell attended Harvard University; he graduated in 1911. He began working as a teacher fresh out of college, starting in a segregated school in St. Louis. He taught in a variety of schools before settling back in Cambridge, Massachusetts. He was an English teacher and later a school principal, while writing professionally on the side. In August 1937, Coryell and his family moved to Hawaii to work at Punahou School, where he headed the junior-level English department. His younger brother Russell M. Coryell was also a teacher and author.

Hubert V. Coryell married Etta Verona Child in 1912. By 1922, they had three children.

Hubert V. Coryell wrote numerous articles about education, often focusing on boys’ issues. He co-authored, with Henry W. Holmes, dean of the Harvard School of Education, Word Finder (1921), a reference book for elementary school children. He wrote fiction and nonfiction for the Macfadden Publications, the publisher that had been so instrumental in his father's writing career. These magazines include Physical Culture, National Brain Power, Midnight Mystery Stories, Movie Weekly, and Ghost Stories. An untold amount of his Macfadden work was published under pennames. In the 1930s, he specialized in adventure novels for boys. He had a following in Sweden, and three of his books were translated and published there in the 1930s. In 1954, a Dutch translation of Klondike Gold was published.

== Selected bibliography ==
=== Magazine fiction ===
- "The Ninth Hole," Detective Story Magazine, January 8, 1918 (as Hubert Child)
- "Ruby of the Heart," Detective Story Magazine, January 8, 1918 (as Hubert Child)
- "The Red God's hand," Midnight Mystery Stories, December 16, 1922 (as Hubert Child)
- "The Wer-Wolf," Midnight Mystery Stories, December 23, 1922 (as Hubert Child)
- "Back From Beyond," Ghost Stories, July 1926
- Tan-Ta-Ka (serial), The Open Road for Boys, February 1933
- "The Bog," Blue Book, June 1948

=== Magazine non-fiction ===
- "The Psychology of the College Man," The Harvard Monthly, December 1910
- "Getting the Boy to Read," Good Housekeeping, October 1920
- "The One-Boy-Power Mental Motor," The Outlook, December 15, 1920
- "A School Teacher Arraigns Our Educational System," Physical Culture, February 1921.
- "Does the Author Count with Boys?," The Outlook, November 15, 1922
- "The Present Generation?," National Brain Power, January 1924
- "Books They Will Like," Woman's Home Companion, November 1924
- "How Doug Gets Away With Murder," Movie Weekly, June 6, 1925
- "Gates to Open" The Elementary English Review, October, 1926
- "Clothes Washer for Camp Use Built Like Churn," Popular Science, July 1950

=== Books ===
- Word Finder (Yonkers-on-Hudson, NY: World Book Company, 1921) (with Henry W. Holmes)
- Tan-Ta-Ka (Boston, MA: Little, Brown and Company, 1934)
- Indian Brother (NY: Harcourt Brace and Co., 1935) (with Fannie Hardy Eckstorm)
- The Scalp Hunters (NY: Harcourt Brace and Co., 1936) (with Fannie Hardy Eckstorm)
- Lives of Danger and Daring (Boston, MA: W.A. Wilde Company, 1936) (with Vansant Coryell, son)
- Klondike Gold (NY: Macmillan, 1938)
