= The White Moll =

1920 film by Harry F. Millarde

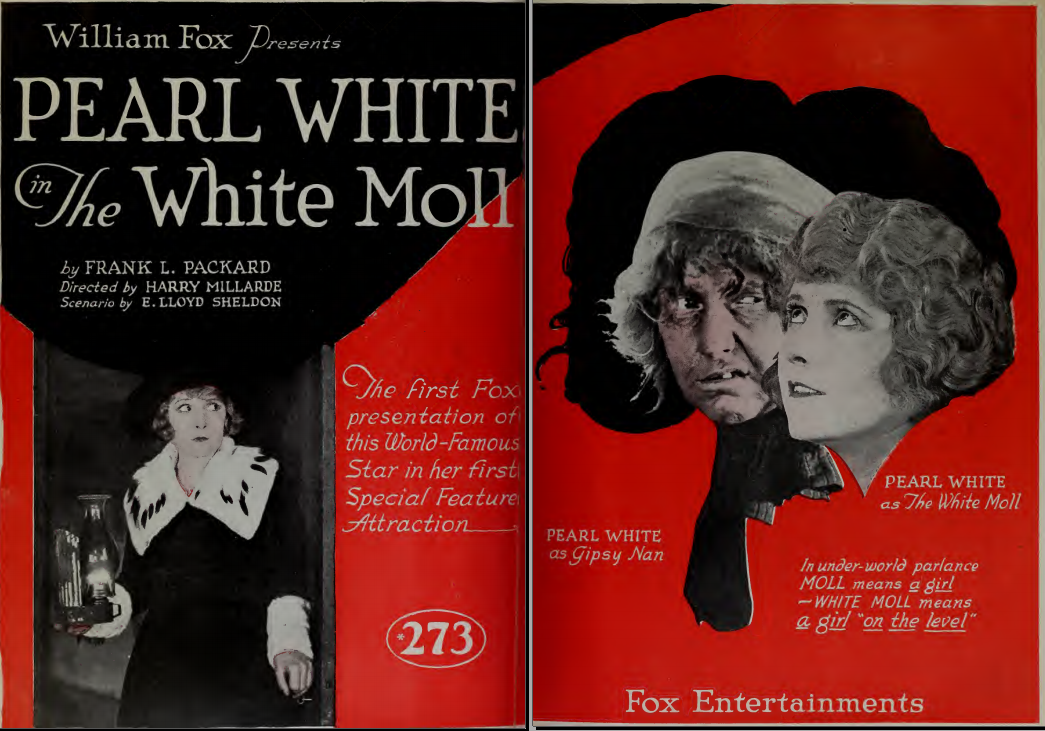
- Ad for film
- Directed by: Harry F. Millarde; Anthony J. Merlo (second director)
- Written by: E. Lloyd Sheldon (scenario)
- Based on: The White Moll by Frank L. Packard
- Produced by: William Fox
- Starring: Pearl White
- Cinematography: Eddie Wynard
- Distributed by: Fox Film Corporation
- Release date: July 24, 1920
- Running time: 5-8 reels
- Country: United States
- Language: Silent (English intertitles)

The White Moll is a lost 1920 American silent feature length crime drama film directed by Harry F. Millarde and starring Pearl White. It was produced and distributed by the Fox Film Corporation. It was based on a novel by the same name, by Frank L. Packard. It marked Pearl White's return to feature films and her first film for Fox Film Corporation.

== Cast ==
- Pearl White as Rhoda, The White Moll
- Richard Travers as The Adventurer, The Pug (credited as Richard C. Travers)
- Jack Baston as The Dangler (credited as J. Thornton Baston)
- Walter P. Lewis as The Sparrow (credited as Walter Lewis)
- Eva Gordon as Gypsy Nan
- John Woodford as Father Michael
- George Pauncefort as Rhoda's Father
- Charles Slattery as Detective Henry
- John P. Wade as The Rich Man
- William Harvey as Skinny
- Blanche Davenport (unconfirmed role)

== See also ==
- 1937 Fox vault fire
