= Frank L. Packard =

Canadian novelist

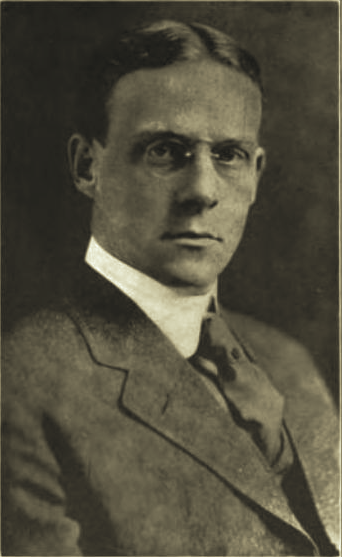
- From May 1913 The Bookman, vol. XXXVII, no. 3, p. 232 for Greater Love Hath No Man
- Born: Frank Lucius Packard; February 2, 1877; Montreal, Quebec, Canada
- Died: February 17, 1942 (aged 65); Lachine, Quebec, Canada
- Resting place: Mount Royal Cemetery, Montreal, Quebec, Canada
- Education: McGill University; University of Liège
- Occupation: Novelist
- Writing career
- Genre: Mystery fiction

Frank Lucius Packard (February 2, 1877 – February 17, 1942) was a Canadian novelist.

== Life ==
Frank L. Packard was born in Montreal, Quebec and educated at McGill University and the University of Liège. As a young man he worked as a civil engineer for the Canadian Pacific Railway. His experiences working on the railroad led to his writing many railroad stories, then to a series of mystery novels, the most famous of which featured a character called Jimmie Dale.

Several of his novels were made into films.

Frank Packard died in 1942 in Lachine, Quebec and was buried in the Mount Royal Cemetery in Montreal.

== Works ==
=== Jimmie Dale series ===
- The Adventures of Jimmie Dale (1917) – (Wikisource text)
- The Further Adventures of Jimmie Dale (1919) – (Wikisource text)
- Jimmie Dale and the Phantom Clue (1922)
- Jimmie Dale and Blue Envelope Murder (1930)
- Jimmie Dale and the Missing Hour (1935)
- Return of the Grey Seal (2007) – (e-book compilation of first two books)
- Jimmie Dale, Alias the Gray Seal by Michael Howard (2017) – (The first new Gray Seal book in more than eighty years.)

=== Other works ===
- On the Iron at Big Cloud (1911) (Wikisource text)
- Greater Love Hath No Man (1913) (Wikisource text)
- The Miracle Man (1914) – (Wikisource text)
- The Belovéd Traitor (1915) – (Project Gutenberg book)
- The Sin That Was His (1917)
- The Wire Devils (1918)
- Coogan's Last Run. (Novella) Published in Top-Notch magazine, Feb. 1918; a slightly expanded version of the short story "The Guardian of the Devil's Slide," which is included in On The Iron at Big Cloud (1911).)
- From Now On (1919)
- The Night Operator (1919)
- The White Moll (1920) – (Wikisource text); also adapted for "lost" film, The White Moll
- Pawned (1921)
- Doors of the Night (1922)
- The Four Stragglers (1923)
- The Locked Book (1924)
- Running Special (1925)
- Broken Waters (1925)
- The Red Ledger (1926)
- The Devil's Mantle (1927)
- Two Stolen Idols (1927)
- Shanghai Jim (1928)
- The Big Shot (1929)
- Tiger Claws (1929)
- Gold Skull Murders (1931)
- The Hidden Door (1933)
- The Purple Ball (1933)
- The Dragon's Jaws (1937)
- More Knaves Than One (1938) (Includes: More Knaves Than One, The King of Fools, Behind The Masks, and The Devil Sits In.)
- The White Moll (1920) – (Wikisource text)
