= Sophie Wenzel Ellis =

Sophie Wenzel Ellis (July 22, 1893 – June 1984) was an American writer. She was an early female author of "pulp" science fiction stories.

== Early life ==
Sophie Louise Wenzel was born in Memphis, Tennessee and lived in Little Rock, Arkansas as an adult.

== Career ==
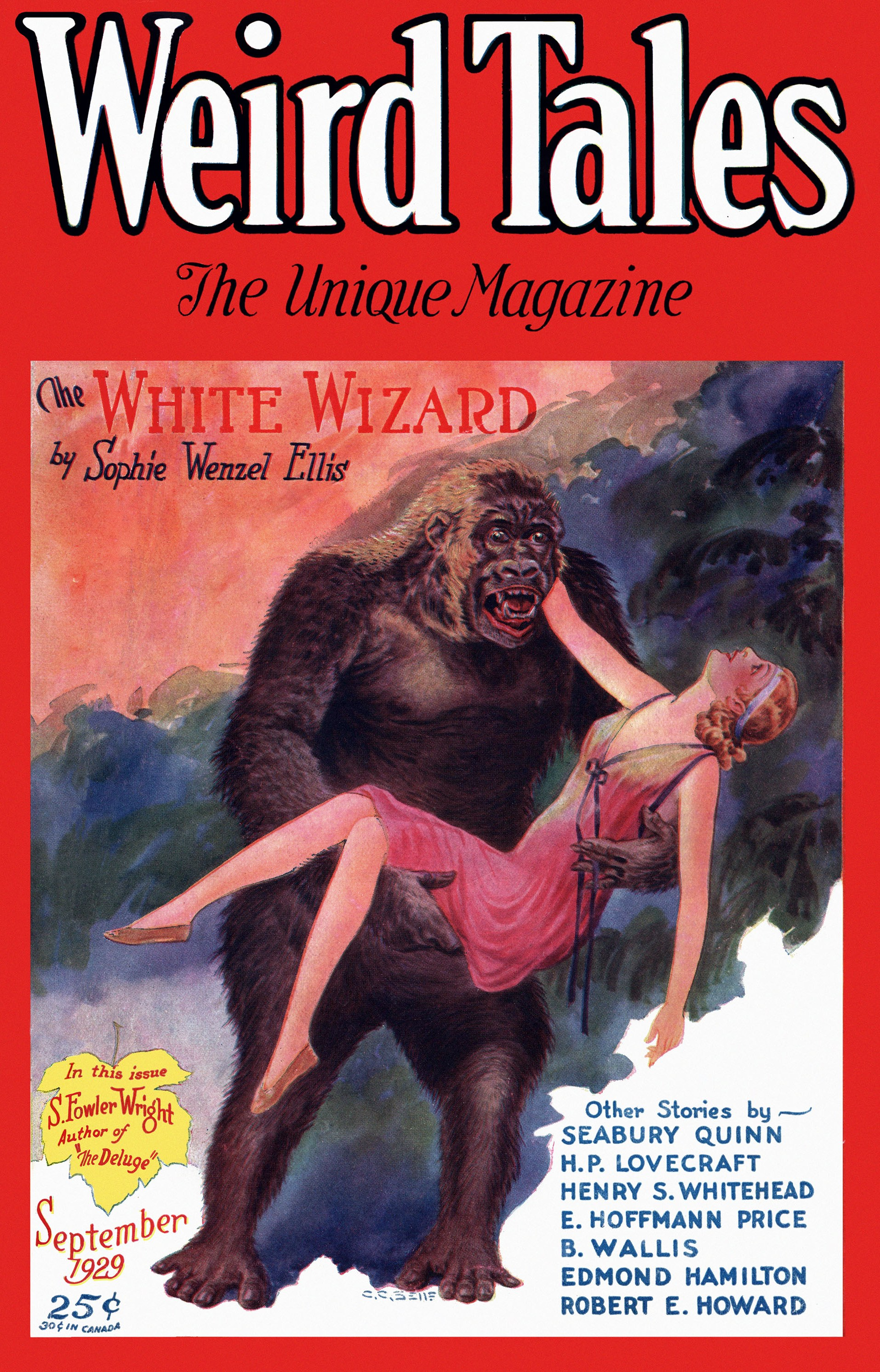
Weird Tales (September 1929), featuring a cover illustration based on Ellis's story "The White Wizard"

Ellis's stories appeared mostly in "pulp" magazines, and included "The Unseen Seventh" (The Thrill Book 1919), "The Lily Garden" (Mystery Stories 1928; republished in Phantom 1958), "The White Wizard" (Weird Tales 1929), "The Spirit in the Garden" (Ghost Stories 1929), "Does Death Guard This Viking Hoard?" (True Strange Stories 1929), "Creatures of the Light" (Astounding 1930), "Slaves of the Dust" (Astounding 1930), "The Shadow World" (Amazing Stories 1932), "White Lady" (Strange Tales 1933), and "The Dwellers in the House" (Weird Tales 1933).

Her stories, especially "Creatures of the Light", have been anthologized several times, including in recent years as an example of early science fiction by women. Ellis modeled Emil Mundson, the mad scientist character in "Creatures of Light", on engineer and professor Charles Proteus Steinmetz. Ellis's "Slaves of the Dust" is set in Brazil, and again involves an unethical scientist with an isolated laboratory, breeding chimeras.

== Personal life ==
Sophie Wenzel married George W. Ellis, sometime after 1918 and before 1924. She died in 1984, at age 90.
