= Jimmie Dale =

Character created by Frank L. Packard

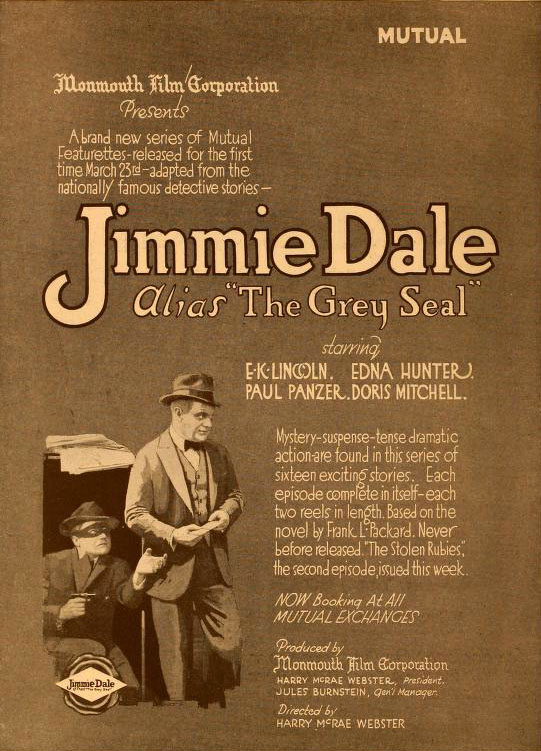
Jimmy Dale, film (1917)

Jimmie Dale is a fictional character created by Frank L. Packard in 1914. Stories featuring the character otherwise known as the Grey Seal were published in magazines including People's Magazine, collected in books, and adapted to film.

== Fictional biography ==
A wealthy playboy by day, at night he puts on inconspicuous dark clothes, a mask and a black slouch hat and becomes the Grey Seal, who enters businesses or homes and cracks safes, always leaving a diamond shaped, grey paper "seal" (with gum on the back) behind to mark his conquest (so others will not be blamed for his crimes), but never taking anything. He was just doing it for "the sheer deviltry of it" at first, but when an unknown woman known only as Tocsin (from chapter 7, after he finds a ring belonging to her with "Sonnez le Tocsin" on it, French for "Ring the alarm bell") catches him (before the first book) she blackmails him to war on certain crime organizations. In the first story, she had left him alone for a year with no new cases. She soon makes up for lost time.

As the Grey Seal, he wears a mask and carries a girdle full of lock picks and such meaning no door or safe can defy him. A case starts with Dale receiving a letter in a roundabout way from the woman with very complete instructions on what he is to do. There is never any explanation how she gains such incredible knowledge of every crime, every house and every criminal and even how she knows everything about Dale, though she too has an underworld identity. He memorises each letter then tears them into the tiniest pieces and discards them. He has searched for clues as to who she is but has found none. Though Dale carries a gun, he does not kill, not even when a thief stole a letter before he read it and learned his identity. It is mostly used as a threat. The Grey Seal originally has the respect of the Underworld, thinking him another thief but when he exposes to the police a crooked lawyer who helped many of them as well as some crooks, they want him dead.

Educated at Harvard and with a house on the expensive Riverside Drive, Dale is a member of the very select St. James Club, having inherited a lot of money from his late father when he sold his safe making business. The elderly Jason is his butler and the young Benson his chauffeur. He also owns an old house with three exits (one hidden) in the Bowery (Manhattan) which he calls his Sanctuary and keeps some changes of clothes and make up there under loose boards for when he becomes the hard faced dope fiend, "Larry The Bat" who has access to all the Underworld because they trust him. In the earlier stories and a later story in the second book, he has an old friend, Herman Carruthers, editor of the (morning) News-Argus newspaper, a source of information and someone who hopes to expose the Grey Seal's real identity one day. The newspapers criticise the police hard for their continued failure to capture the Grey Seal.

Chapter 20 of the first book explains all about the Tocsin and the evil Crime Club, an organisation of master criminals with their fingers in most things crooked. Shortly afterwards, the Magpie, a criminal discovers that Larry the Bat is the Grey Seal, spreads the word, and a mob of criminals race after him to kill him. He is cornered in his Sanctuary, with the Tocsin but as it burns down, they manage to escape and it is believed that both are dead.

Jimmie Dale uses the new identity of Smarlinghue, another dope fiend and a poor artist in the second book, and he has a new Sanctuary. He has spent six months building up trust in his new identity with the Underworld. However someone wants the Tocsin dead and instead of a life together, she goes on the run thinking if she stays with Dale, he will be killed too. She sends more letters for more missions to Dale and the Underworld finds out the Grey Seal is still alive. After some more adventures, she explains all in Chapter 22 (second book), and after the villain is finally killed, they escape in a boat together for hopefully a new life together.

== Appearances ==
=== Books ===
Dale's adventures first appeared in People's Magazine, Short Stories and Detective Story Weekly and then were collected into novels with the serializations generally appearing the year before the novel version was published.

- The Adventures of Jimmie Dale Toronto : Copp Clark 1917
- The Further Adventures of Jimmie Dale Toronto : Copp, Clark 1919
- Jimmie Dale and The Phantom Clue New York : A. L. Burt 1922
- Jimmie Dale and Blue Envelope Murder New York : Doubleday, Doran and Company 1930
- Jimmie Dale and the Missing Hour (1935)

In 2007, the first two books featuring Jimmie Dale/The Grey Seal were re-released as an e-book entitled Return of The Grey Seal.

2017 saw the publication of the pastiche novel, Jimmie Dale, Alias the Grey Seal, by Michael Howard. This is the first new Jimmie Dale book since 1935. In 2019, the original novels are being reprinted by Howard.

=== Film serial ===
He also appeared in a movie serial, Jimmie Dale Alias the Gray Seal, in 1917.

Chapters titles were: 1. The Grey Seal 2. The Stolen Rubies 3. The Counterfeit Five 4. The Metzer Murder Mystery 5. A Fight for Honor 6. Below the Deadline 7. The Devil's Work 8. The Underdog 9. The Alibi 10. Two Crooks and a Knave 11. A Rogue's Defeat 12. The Man Higher Up 13. Good for Evil 14. A Sheep Among Wolves 15. The Tapped Wires 16. The Victory.

== Legacy ==
Jimmie Dale/The Grey Seal is often credited with popularizing and evolving what would greatly influence later pulp and comic book heroes. The foppish playboy by-day-crimefighter-by-night routine had a precursor in The Scarlet Pimpernel, but it was Jimmie Dale that brought the idea into a contemporary setting and added the idea of a costume and mask for his secret identity, serving as a possible influence for characters like Zorro and The Shadow.

He also established the concept of a hero's secret hideout or lair, The Sanctuary, a precursor of the Batcave or the Fortress of Solitude.

== See also ==
- List of film serials
