= Elmer Brown Mason =

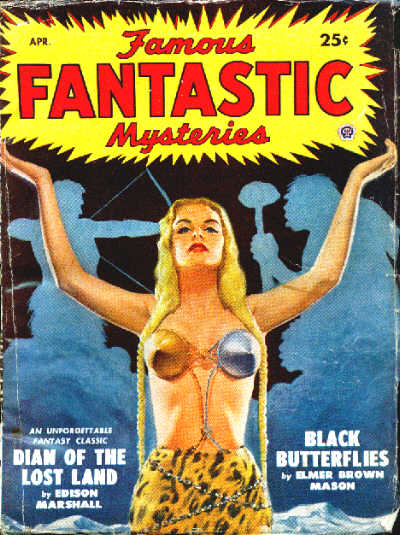
Brown's 1916 story "Black Butterflies" was reprinted in the April 1949 issue of Famous Fantastic Mysteries

Elmer Brown Mason (1877–1955) was an American writer. He studied at Yale for a period, but then transferred to Princeton, from which he graduated in 1903. Mason became an entomologist for the now-defunct Bureau of Entomology (USDA) in 1910. In addition, he was a seasoned world traveler. In 1915, his fantastic stories of scientists hunting rare species in the remote corners of the world started appearing. Of note were the five stories featuring swamp-guide, Wandering Smith, in The Popular Magazine, especially "The Golden Anaconda"; and the variety of tales in All-Story Weekly, highlighted by the horror-filled lost-race novelette "Black Butterflies," set in Borneo, and its sequel, "Red Tree-Frogs."

Mason was gassed in France during World War I, suffering permanent disabilities, which sidetracked his writing career. His globe-trotting ceased and his stories exchanged the fantastic for the domestic. His fiction writing career petered out around 1926.

He had a brief revival in 1949-50 in the pulp magazines, Famous Fantastic Mysteries and Fantastic Novels, which reprinted four of his stories from All-Story Weekly.

"Black Butterflies," was included in the anthology Rainbow Fantasia: 35 Spectrumatic Tales of Wonder ed. by Forrest J. Ackerman; Anne Hardin.

Off-Trail Publications put out The Golden Anaconda in 2009 with all the Wandering Smith stories and 5 stories from All-Story Weekly.
