= Ormond Gerald Smith =

President of Street & Smith

Ormond Gerald Smith (August 30, 1860 – April 17, 1933) was the president of Street & Smith.

He was the youngest son of Mary Jellett Duff (1838 – c.1885) and Francis Shubael Smith I (1819–1887). Francis partnered with Francis Scott Street and started the publishing firm of Street & Smith. Ormond had the following siblings: Francis Shubael Smith II (1854–?); Cora A. Smith (1857–?) who married George H. Gould; and George Campbell Smith (1859–?). He graduated from Harvard University in 1883, and joined his father at Street & Smith after graduation. On December 25, 1899 Ormond married Grace Hewitt Pellett and they had one child: Gerald Hewitt Smith who attended Princeton University. Ormond was a member Society of the War of 1812, the St. Nicholas Society, and the Society of Colonial Wars. He died in 1933 in Manhattan.
