= Supersnipe =

Fictional comic book character

Supersnipe is a fictional character who appeared in a series of comic books published by Street & Smith from 1942 to 1949. Supersnipe was the imagined alter ego of Koppy McFad, "the boy with the most comic books in the world." He was created by writer-artist George Marcoux, who had previously assisted Percy Crosby on the comic strip Skippy.

Koppy McFad has read so many comic books ("he reads 'em, breathes 'em, and sleeps 'em") that in his imagination, he turns into a costumed super-hero himself. He acts out his superhero adventures a la Don Quixote, annoying his family and his neighbors. He has no powers, but when he fills his suit with helium, he can fly.

In his adventures, Supersnipe sometimes partners with another boy, Ulysses Q. Wacky, who is referred to as an "inventor and genius unlimited." In 1943, the strip introduced a rival to Supersnipe, Roxy the Girl Guerrilla. In 1944, two more characters were added to the cast — Wing Woo Woo, and a boy detective, Herlock Dolmes.

The character of Supersnipe first appeared in issues of Shadow Comics (vol. 2 no. 3) and Army and Navy Comics (vol. 1 no. 5). The strip was so popular that the next issue of Army and Navy was retitled Supersnipe Comics. Supersnipe appeared for a total of 44 issues before ceasing publication in 1949.

Supersnipe has been described as "the first comic book to deal with comics themselves as subject matter."
