= Francis Scott Street =

American publisher (1831–1883)

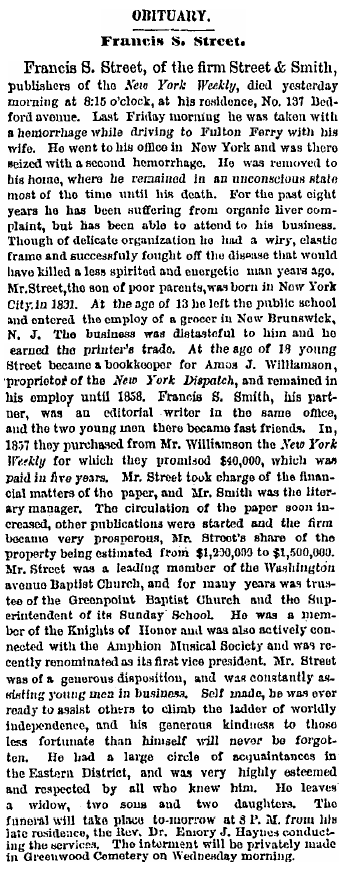
Francis Scott Street (1831–1883) obituary in the Brooklyn Eagle on April 16, 1883

Francis Scott Street (October 20, 1831 – April 15, 1883), with partner Francis Shubael Smith were the owners of Street & Smith publishing company in New York City.

== New York Dispatch ==
He was born in New York City in 1831, but moved to New Brunswick, New Jersey in 1844 to work for a grocer. In 1849 he went to work as a bookkeeper for Amos J. Williamson, the publisher of the New York Dispatch, a weekly newspaper. Street teamed up with Francis Shubael Smith, then an editor at the Dispatch in 1855 when they bought a failing magazine together. They then bought the New York Dispatch Weekly in 1858 for $40,000. The sum was to be paid to Williamson over 5 years. Street and Smith were able to increase circulation, and at the time it became one of the most widely circulated New York City weekly newspapers.

== Marriage ==
Francis married Susan E. Potts (1836–1883), daughter of Abram and Elizabeth Potts, around 1858 and they lived in Greenpoint in Brooklyn in 1860. Susan died on June 5, 1883, just 8 weeks after her husband died. Together they had two sons and two daughters.

Francis had a cousin: Jacob Street (c1790-?) from Pitminster, England who moved to Newfoundland, Canada around 1820. Jacob left Canada to travel back to England in 1858–1860, and then he went to New York City where he stayed with his cousin Francis Scott Street.

== Death ==
He was suffering from liver disease for several years but died from a cerebral hemorrhage at his home at 137 Bedford Avenue in Brooklyn. He was buried in Green-Wood Cemetery in Brooklyn, New York in a coffin of red cedar with gold trimmings.
