= Francis Shubael Smith =

American publisher

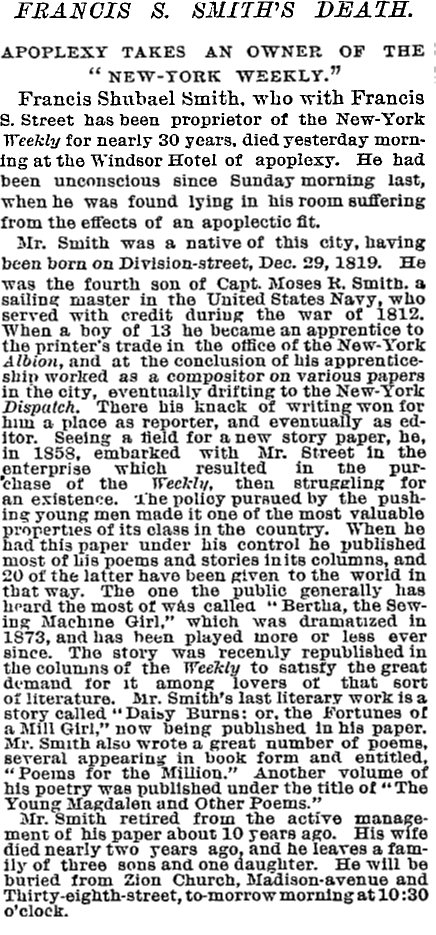
Francis Shubael Smith (1819-1887) obituary

Francis Shubael Smith I (December 29, 1819 – February 1, 1887) partnered with Francis Scott Street and started the publishing firm of Street & Smith.

== Biography ==
He was born at 1798 Division Street in New York City, and was the fourth son of Mary Reed (1781-1864) and Moses Rogers Smith (1768-1847). Moses was a sailing master in the US Navy, and served in the War of 1812. Moses met Mary Reed in the West Indies, they eloped and sailed to Manhattan.

In 1832 Francis was apprenticed to the printer of the New York Albion. After completing his apprenticeship he worked at various papers including the New York Weekly Dispatch. He then became a reporter at the Dispatch and then an editor.

He married Mary Jellett Duff (1838-1885) around 1853, and had the following children: Francis Shubael Smith II (1854-?); Cora Anna Smith (1855-1945) who married George H. Gould; George Campbell Smith (1859-?); and Ormond Gerald Smith (1860-1933).

He partnered with Francis Scott Street in 1855 to buy a failing magazine. They then bought the New York Weekly Dispatch in 1858. He published over 20 of his own short stories in the newspaper and many of his poems. He retired around 1877, and Francis Scott Street died in 1883. His son Ormond took over the business after his Francis's death.

He died on February 1, 1887, at the Windsor Hotel in New York City of apoplexy. His funeral was held at Zion Church on Madison Avenue in New York City.

== Publications ==
- Pictorial life and adventures of Eveleen Wilson, or, The trials of an orphan girl
- Life & adventures of Josh Billings: With a characteristic sketch of the humorist
- Daisy Burns: the Fortunes of a Mill Girl (1887)
- Poems for the Millions
- The Young Magdalen and other Poems
