= Love Story Magazine =

American romantic fiction pulp magazine

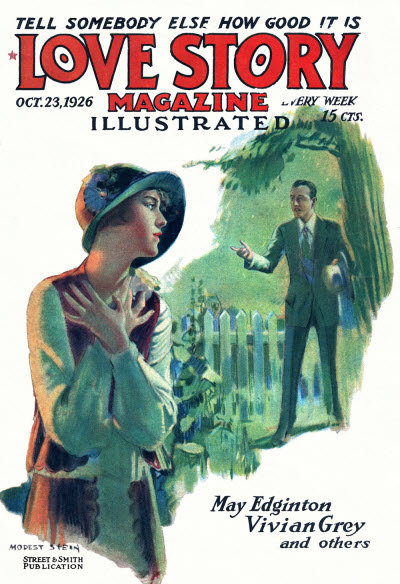
The cover of the October 23, 1926, issue of Love Story Magazine. The artwork is by Modest Stein.

Love Story Magazine was an American romantic fiction pulp magazine, published from 1921 to 1947. It was one of the best selling magazines of Street & Smith.

The magazine's circulation was 100,000 in 1922, and 600,000 by 1932.

The magazine's first issue was released in May 1921 as a quarterly. It became a semi-monthly by August, and a weekly in 1922. When Smith's Magazine folded in early 1922, its female audience was merged into the new publication.

Daisy Bacon served as longtime editor of the magazine, from about 1928 through its end. Writers who contributed to the magazine included Peggy Dern (writing as Peggy Gaddis) and Maysie Greig. Science fiction writer Murray Leinster also wrote for Love Story under the name Louisa Carter Lee.

Another publication called Love Story Magazine was published by Popular Publications from 1952 to 1954.

== External ==
- "Selected public domain issues at archive.org". The Online Books Page.
