= Sidney Riesenberg =

American artist (1885–1971)

- Born: Sidney Harry Riesenberg; 12 December 1885; Chicago, Illinois
- Died: 11 October 1971 (aged 85); Cambridge, Massachusetts
- Education: Art Institute of Chicago
- Known for: Oil painting; Illustration
- Notable work: Over the Top for You
- Awards: Frederick Magnus Brand Award for Composition, 1906

Sidney Harry Riesenberg (12 December 1885 – 11 October 1971) was an illustrator and artist who lived in Yonkers, New York. He was known as a professional illustrator for his posters for the United States Marine Corps and the Liberty bond programs, for his illustrations for book covers, magazines, and for oil paintings of diverse subjects. He retired from his professional work and dedicated his full-time energy to painting fine arts and teaching. In 1937 he began spending summers in Rockport, Massachusetts, where he painted scenes of the small fishing town. He was active in the Rockport Art Association, teaching oil painting and participating in water color figure painting classes.

== Biography ==
Riesenberg was born in 1885 in Chicago to Wilhelm Riesenberg (later William), a German immigrant, and Emily Riesenberg (née Schorb), a first generation German-American. He was educated at the Art Institute of Chicago, where he won the Frederick Magnus Brand prize for composition in 1906. He graduated with an Academic certificate in Drawing, Painting and Modeling. After graduation, he traveled to the American West by train and also to Querétaro, Mexico, on horseback and then moved to Yonkers where he began his career as a professional illustrator. His travels inspired a lifelong interest in depicting the American West frontier as was then being popularized by Zane Grey and other writers. In the early 1930s, Riesenberg began illustrating for national magazines. In the 1930s and 1940s, his work was often featured at venues such as the Art Institute of Chicago and the National Academy of Design and in organizations such as the Allied Artists of America. Riesenberg also won awards in oil, water color and drawing. In the 1950s he was an art instructor at the Westchester Workshop in White Plains, New York. Riesenberg also served as President of the Yonkers Art Association. His older brother, Felix Riesenberg, was a noted American maritime officer, explorer and writer of professional, historical and fictional literature with whom he was close. Riesenberg died in 1971 in Cambridge, Massachusetts.

== Works ==
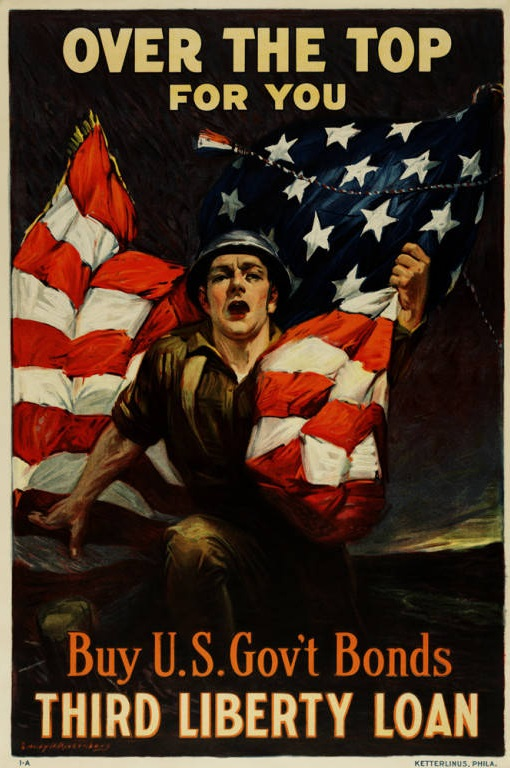
Over the Top For You, one of Riesenberg's WWI-era posters advertising liberty loans, where a doughboy clutches the American flag

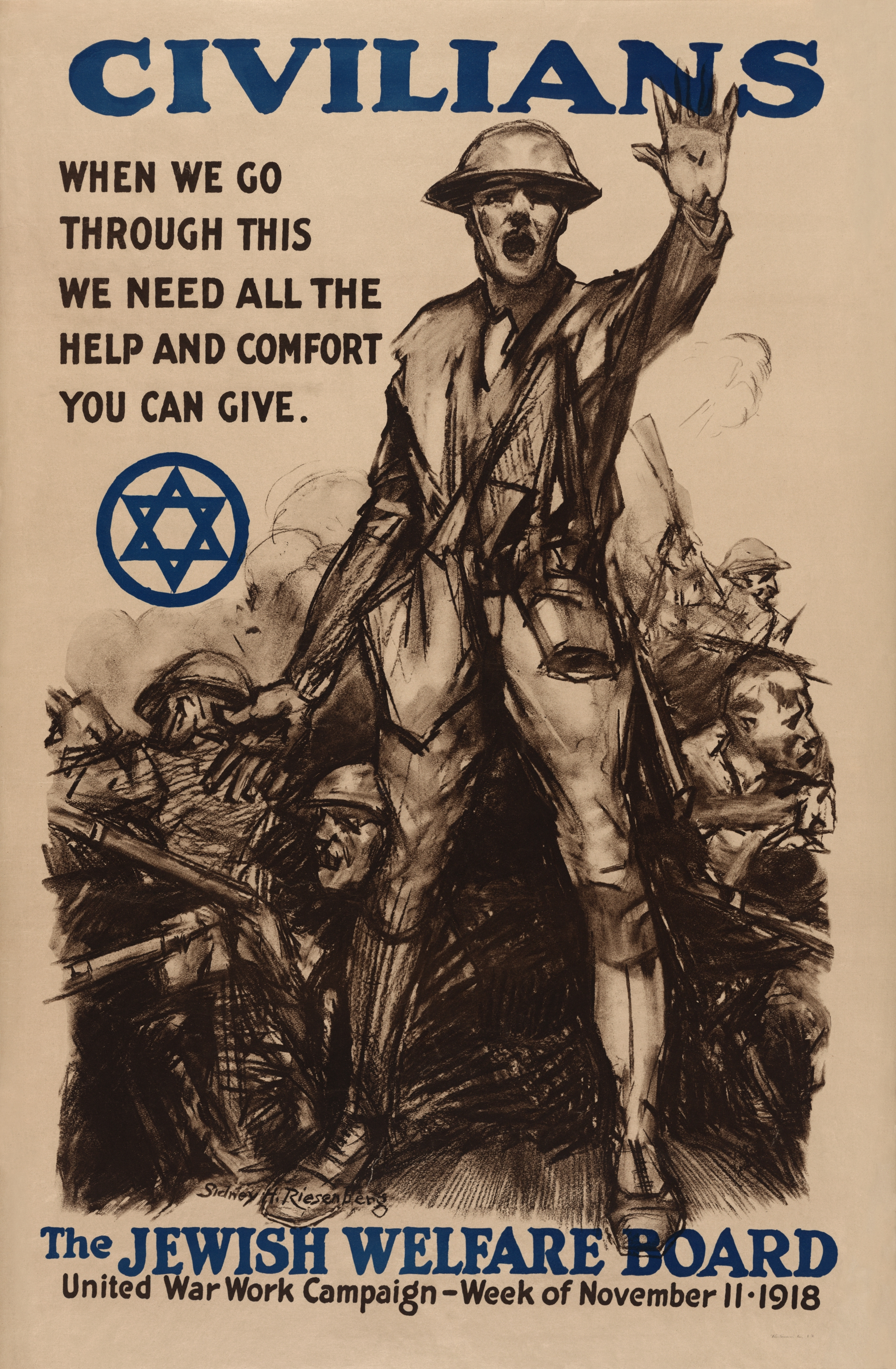
A National Jewish Welfare Board World War I poster by Riesenberg, c. 1918

Of Riesenberg's work, his contributions during World War I are well known and he is described as "one of the greatest illustrators of the World War I era." Riesenberg's style, it has been said, shows influences from Impressionism.

He produced many posters for the US Marine Corps in addition to posters advertising the Liberty Loan campaign during World War I. One of Riesenberg's most well known works is his 1918 World War I-era poster, Over the Top for You, which illustrates a young doughboy clutching the American flag. With its bold illustration and concise text, like many war posters of the time, Over the Top for You encouraged the public to support its military by purchasing liberty loans. Among other posters, it was selected to display in the Smithsonian American Art Museum under the exhibit, Over the Top: American Posters from World War I. Riesenberg also created several posters for the United States Navy, one of which, titled Democracy's Vanguard, illustrates Marines landing from a boat to initiate an offensive. Another illustrated uniformed soldiers raising the flag against the background of a warship.

Riesenberg created illustrations, including covers, for many national publications such as Boys' Life Magazine, the monthly magazine of the Boy Scouts of America, Harper's, The Saturday Evening Post, Collier's, Life and Scribner's. The many thematic subjects of his fine art included scenes from places he lived, historical and action scenes, portraits, as well as the Old West.
