= New York Weekly =

Newspaper published in New York City

The New York Weekly was a story newspaper published from 1858–1910 in New York City. Under related names it was published from 1846–1915.

The paper had its origins in 1846 as the New York Dispatch (1846–1854), and New York Weekly Dispatch (1855–1858), with Amor J. Williamson as proprietor. and was purchased by Francis Shubael Smith and Francis Scott Street in 1858. Smith was an editor at the Dispatch and Street a bookkeeper, and they paid $40,000 for the ownership of the paper (paying nothing up front, but paying it off within 5 years).

From 1910 to 1915 it was published as the New York Weekly Welcome.

== See also ==
- Street & Smith
