= The Popular Magazine =

Early American literary magazine

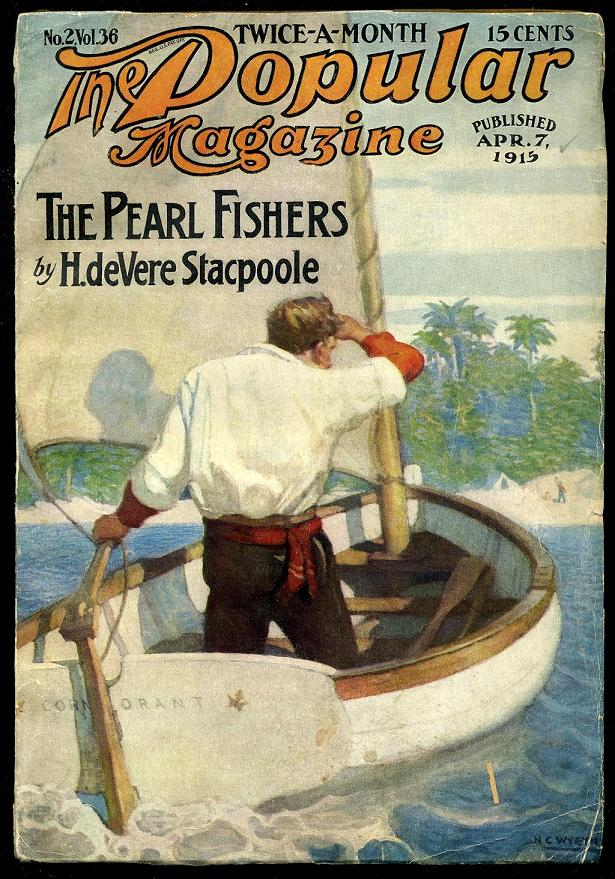
- April 7, 1915 issue
- Editor: Henry Harrison Lewis (1903-1904); Charles Agnew MacLean (1904-1928)
- Categories: Literary magazines
- Frequency: Variable; most often bi-monthly
- Publisher: Street & Smith
- First issue: November 1903
- Final issue: October 1931
- Country: United States
- Based in: Manhattan. New York City
- Language: English

The Popular Magazine was an early American literary magazine that ran for 612 issues from November 1903 to October 1931. It featured short fiction, novellas, serialized larger works, and even entire short novels. The magazine's subject matter ranged over a number of genres, although it tended somewhat towards men's adventure stories, particularly in the waning years of the publication when the vogue for hardboiled fiction was strong. The Popular Magazine touted itself as "a magazine for men and women who like to read about men." The magazine had its headquarters in New York City.

The Popular Magazine was published by Street & Smith and edited by Henry Harrison Lewis from 1903 to 1904, and Charles Agnew MacLean from 1904 to 1928. A typical bi-monthly issue usually ran from 194 to 224 pages. In October 1931, The Popular Magazine was merged with another Street & Smith pulp, Complete Stories.

== History ==
The Popular Magazine initially started as a boy's magazine, but the editorial focus was shifted after only three issues to one of adult mainstream fiction, a program the magazine would retain for the rest of its publication run. The magazine was printed on pulp paper. The magazine can be considered a forerunner of the pulp fiction magazines that were prominent from the 1920s to 1950s, as it avoided more highbrow fare in favor of fiction "for the common man." Several issues of The Popular Magazine featured illustrations by N.C. Wyeth.

One of the magazine's earliest successes came with the publication of H. Rider Haggard's novel Ayesha in 1905. Other notable writers published by The Popular Magazine include Morgan Robertson, H.G. Wells, Rafael Sabatini, Zane Grey, Beatrice Grimshaw, Elmer Brown Mason, James Francis Dwyer and William Wallace Cook. The Popular Magazine published Craig Kennedy stories by Arthur B. Reeve, and other crime fiction by Frederick William Davis and Lemuel de Bra. MacLean also ran spy fiction by E. Phillips Oppenheim and George Bronson-Howard. MacLean stated in a 1910 editorial that he did not want The Popular Magazine to publish "tales of the utterly impossible". Despite this, The Popular Magazine did carry science fiction and fantasy stories by Edwin Balmer, John Buchan, John Collier, Roy Norton, Sax Rohmer and Edgar Wallace.

The magazine went through several slight name changes towards the end of its run. In December 1927 it became Popular Stories, and then a month later, The Popular. In October 1928 the name was changed back to The Popular Magazine once again. There was a significant turnover of writers around 1930, and Street & Smith correspondence with one of its authors at that time admitted that it had been decided to "cut out the old writers and get down to material of speedier, cheaper quality."
