= Street & Smith =

New York City publisher (1855–1959)

Street & Smith Publications, Inc.
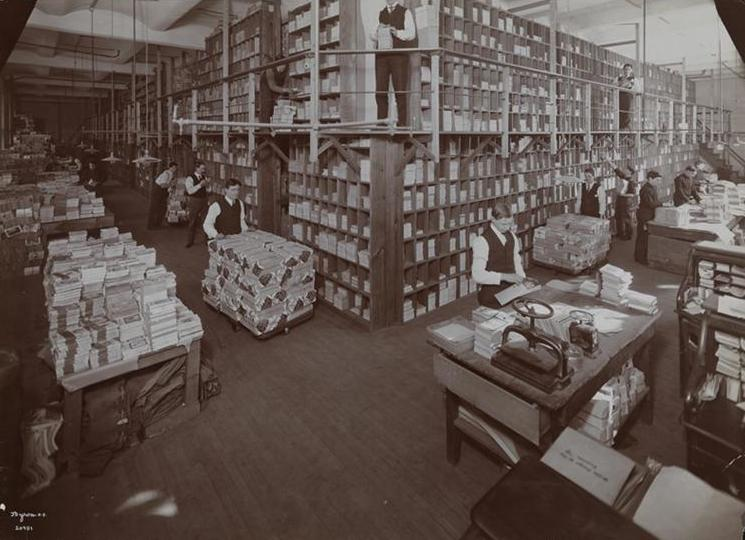
- Street & Smith book department in 1906
- Founded: 1855; 171 years ago
- Founder: Francis Scott Street; Francis Shubael Smith
- Defunct: 1949; 77 years ago as Comic Books 1959; 67 years ago
- Successor: Condé Nast Publications
- Country of origin: United States
- Headquarters location: 79 Seventh Avenue, Manhattan
- Key people: Ormond Gerald Smith
- Publication types: Paperbacks, Magazines, Comics
- Nonfiction topics: Sports
- Fiction genres: Pulp magazines

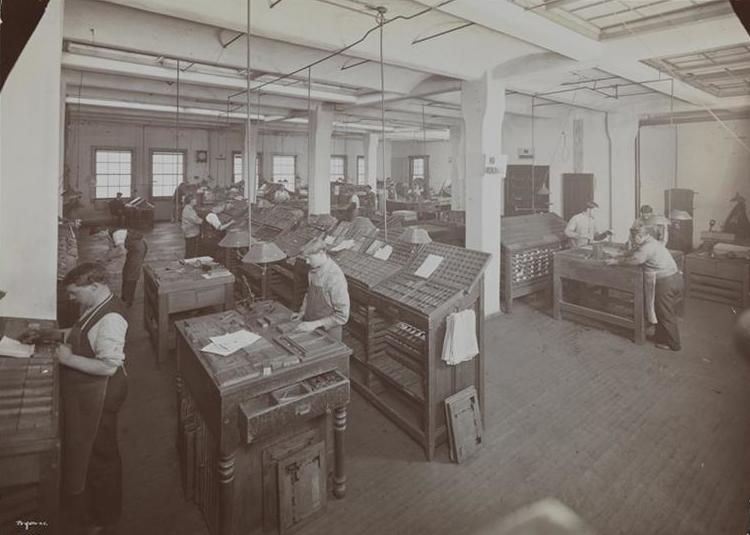
Street & Smith composing room circa 1905–1910

Street & Smith or Street & Smith Publications, Inc., was a New York City publisher specializing in inexpensive paperbacks and magazines referred to as dime novels and pulp fiction. They also published comic books and sporting yearbooks. Among their many titles was the science fiction pulp magazine Astounding Stories, acquired from Clayton Magazines in 1933, and retained until 1961. Street & Smith was founded in 1855, and was bought out in 1959. The Street & Smith headquarters was at 79 Seventh Avenue in Manhattan; they were designed by Henry F. Kilburn. Creations to emerge from the company included The Shadow, Doc Savage and The Avenger.

== History ==
=== Founding ===
Street & Smith bindery in 1910

Francis Scott Street and Francis Shubael Smith began their publishing partnership in 1855 when they took over a broken-down fiction magazine. They then bought the existing New York Weekly Dispatch in 1858. Francis Smith was the company president from 1855 until his 1887 retirement, his son Ormond Gerald Smith taking over his role. Francis Street died in 1883. Francis Smith died on February 1, 1887. The company, which owned a six-story building at 79 Seventh Avenue (just north of 14th Street), became a publisher of inexpensive novels and weekly magazines starting in the 1880s and continuing into 1959. In the early decades of the 20th century, Ormond V. Gould was the company secretary. Ormond Smith remained company president until his death in 1933.

In 1933, Street & Smith bought titles from Clayton Magazines, including Astounding Stories. In 1934 they put out 35 different magazines, looked after by about a dozen editors, including John Nanovic, Frank Blackwell, Daisy Bacon and F. Orlin Tremaine. The company paid one cent a word, which was standard base rate among the major publishing groups, though fringe publishers paid less. In 1937, Street & Smith discontinued a number of their pulp titles, including Top-Notch and Complete Stories, the start of a long-term shrinking of their pulp line. In 1938, Allen L. Grammer became president. He had spent more than twenty years as an ergonomics expert for Curtis Publishing Company, and made a small fortune inventing a new printing process. He moved the offices into a skyscraper.

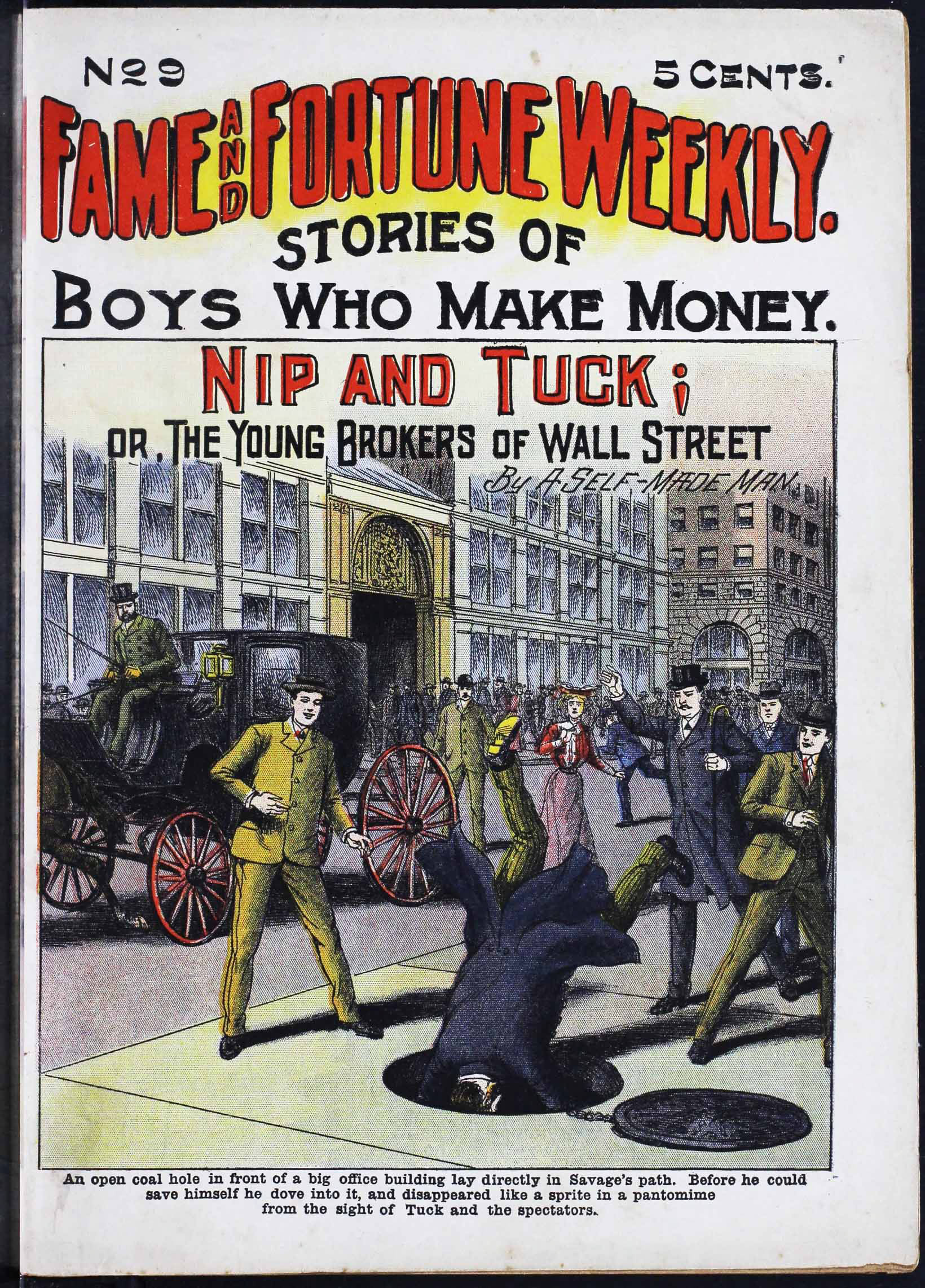
Fame and Fortune weekly, a dime novel published by Street & Smith in 1905

Street & Smith published comic books from 1940 to 1949, their most notable titles being The Shadow, from their pulp magazine line, Super-Magician Comics, Supersnipe Comics, True Sport Picture Stories, Bill Barnes/Air Ace and Doc Savage Comics, also from the pulp magazine line.

=== Demise ===
Street & Smith stopped publishing all their pulps and comics, with one exception, in 1949, selling off several of their titles to Popular Publications. Sales had declined with the advent of paperback books and, to some extent, television. They continued to publish Astounding Science Fiction well into the late 1950s.

Condé Nast Publications, a subsidiary of the Newhouse family's Advance Publications, bought the company for more than $3.5 million in 1959. The company's name continued to be used on the sports pre-season preview magazines until 2007 when Advance division American City Business Journals acquired the Sporting News, originally The Sporting News, and merged Street & Smith's annuals into TSN's annuals.

In 2017, American City Business Journals revived the Street & Smith name for its sports annuals, published collectively as Street & Smith's Yearbooks. Issues are published at the start of each applicable sport's season, with individual issues subtitled to reflect the season and sport, such as: 2019 College Football; 2020 Fantasy Baseball; 2022–23 NBA Preview.

== Authors ==
- Horatio Alger
- Isaac Asimov
- John W. Campbell
- Weldon J. Cobb
- William Wallace Cook
- John R. Coryell
- Robert C. Dennis
- Lester Dent
- Theodore Dreiser
- J. Allan Dunn
- Paul Ernst
- Walter B. Gibson
- H. Rider Haggard
- Robert A. Heinlein
- L. Ron Hubbard
- Carl Richard Jacobi
- Jack London
- John Hovey Robinson
- Clifford D. Simak
- Upton Sinclair

== Illustrators ==
- Walter M. Baumhofer
- Earle K. Bergey
- Edd Cartier
- Emery Clarke
- Dean Cornwell
- Harvey Dunn
- Frank Kramer
- J. C. Leyendecker
- Tom Lovell
- Modest Stein
- N.C. Wyeth

== Book series ==
- The Adventure Library
- Alger Series: Clean Adventure Stories for Boys
- Annapolis series
- Bertha M. Clay Library
- Bound To Win Library
- Boys' Own Library
- Brave and Bold
- Buffalo Bill Border Stories
- Bullion
- Burt L. Standish Library
- Choice Series
- Clean Adventure Stories for Boys
- Crime Busters
- Diamond Dick Jr.
- Diamond Hand-Book Series
- The Eagle Library
- Eden Series
- The Ideal Library
- The Jesse James Stories
- The Ledger Library
- Log Cabin Library
- The Love Story Library
- The Magnet Library
- Medal Library
- The Merriwell Series
- Might and Main Library
- New Eagle Series
- New Magnet Library
- The New Medal Library
- New Secret Service Series
- New Southworth Library
- Nugget Library
- The Red Raven Library (The Winner Library Co [Street & Smith], New York)
- Round the World Library
- S & S Little Classics
- Sea Shore & Mountain Series
- Select Library
- Sports Stories
- Ted Strong Western Story Library
- True Sport Picture Stories
- The Western Story Library
- Women's Stories

== Magazines ==
- Air Trails
- Analog Science Fiction and Fact
- Astounding Science Fiction
- The Avenger
- Baseball Pictorial Year Book
- College Stories
- Detective Story Annual
- Doc Savage Magazine
- New Tip Top Weekly
- Nick Carter Weekly
- The Shadow
- Street & Smith's Sport Story Magazine
- Street & Smith's Wild West Weekly
- Tip Top Weekly
- Top-Notch Magazine

== Archive ==
- Syracuse University holds:
  - Dime Novels with cover image files
  - Yellow Kid image gallery
  - Street & Smith editorial records
- Bowling Green State University holds:
  - Dime novels in PDF format and cover images
- Northern Illinois University holds:
  - Dime novels in PDF format readable online through its Nickels and Dimes collection

== See also ==
- List of Street & Smith publications
