= List of feature film series with five entries =

This is a list of film series that have five entries.

Key:

- (A) – Film series is 100% animated
- (a) – Film series is not 100% animated and has live action in a sequel or prequel
- (TV) – made-for-TV
- (V) – direct-to-video
- (*) – TV series attached

== A ==
- American Ninja
  1. American Ninja (1985)
  2. American Ninja 2: The Confrontation (1987)
  3. American Ninja 3: Blood Hunt (1989)
  4. American Ninja 4: The Annihilation (1990)
  5. American Ninja V (1993) (V)
- The Addams Family (a) **
  1. The Addams Family (1991)
  2. Addams Family Values (1993)
  3. Addams Family Reunion (1998) (V)
  4. The Addams Family (2019) (A)
  5. The Addams Family 2 (2021) (A)
- The Adventures of Sherlock Holmes and Dr. Watson (Russian film series)
  1. Sherlock Holmes and Dr. Watson (1979)
  2. The Adventures of Sherlock Holmes and Dr. Watson (1980)
  3. The Hound of the Baskervilles (1981)
  4. The Treasures of Agra (1983)
  5. The Twentieth Century Approaches (1986)
- All for the Winner
  1. All for the Winner (1989)
  2. God of Gamblers II (1991)
  3. God of Gamblers III: Back to Shanghai (1991)
  4. The Top Bet (1991) (spin-off)
  5. The Saint of Gamblers (1995) (spin-off)
- Andy Doyle
  1. Dial Red O (1955)
  2. Sudden Danger (1955)
  3. Calling Homicide (1956)
  4. Chain of Evidence (1957)
  5. Footsteps in the Night (1957)
- Antoine Doinel
  1. Les Quatre cents coups (The 400 Blows) (1959)
  2. L'Amour à vingt ans (Antoine and Colette) (1962)
  3. Baisers volés (Stolen Kisses) (1968)
  4. Domicile conjugal (Bed & Board) (1970)
  5. L'Amour en fuite (Love on the Run) (1979)
- Angélique
  1. Angélique, Marquise des Anges (1964)
  2. Marvelous Angelique (1965)
  3. Angelique and the King (1966)
  4. Untamable Angelique (1967)
  5. Angelique and the Sultan (1968)
- Avatar: The Last Airbender *
  1. Avatar: The Fury of Aang (2006) (TV)
  2. Avatar: Secret of The Fire Nation (2006) (TV)
  3. Avatar: The Day of Black Sun (2007) (TV)
  4. Avatar: The Boling Rock (2008) (TV)
  5. Sozin's Comet (2008) (TV)

== B ==
- Bloodsport
  1. Bloodsport (1988)
  2. Bloodsport II: The Next Kumite (1996) (V)
  3. Bloodsport III (1997) (V)
  4. Bloodsport 4: The Dark Kumite (1999) (V)
  5. Lady Bloodfight (2016) (V)
- Beauty and the Beast (a) *
  1. Beauty and the Beast (1991) (A)
  2. Beauty and the Beast: The Enchanted Christmas (1997) (A) (V)
  3. Belle's Magical World (1998) (A) (V)
  4. Belle's Tales of Friendship (1999) (V)
  5. Beauty and the Beast (2017)
- Bourne
  1. The Bourne Identity (2002)
  2. The Bourne Supremacy (2004)
  3. The Bourne Ultimatum (2007)
  4. The Bourne Legacy (2012)
  5. Jason Bourne (2016) (retcon)
- Baby Geniuses
  1. Baby Geniuses (1999)
  2. Superbabies: Baby Geniuses 2 (2004)
  3. Baby Geniuses and the Mystery of the Crown Jewels (2013) (V)
  4. Baby Geniuses and the Treasures of Egypt (2014) (V)
  5. Baby Geniuses and the Space Baby (2015) (V)
- Ben 10 ***** (a)
  1. Ben 10: Secret of the Omnitrix (2007) (TV)
  2. Ben 10: Race Against Time (2007) (TV)
  3. Ben 10: Alien Swarm (2009) (TV)
  4. Ben 10: Destroy All Aliens (2012) (TV)
  5. Ben 10 Versus the Universe: The Movie (2020) (TV)
- Benji *
  1. Benji (1974)
  2. For the Love of Benji (1977)
  3. Oh Heavenly Dog (1980)
  4. Benji the Hunted (1987)
  5. Benji: Off the Leash! (2004)
- Boggy Creek
  1. The Legend of Boggy Creek (1973)
  2. Return to Boggy Creek (1977)
  3. Boggy Creek II: And the Legend Continues (1985)
  4. Boggy Creek (2010) (a.k.a. Boggy Creek: The Legend Is True)
  5. The Legacy of Boggy Creek (2011)
- Bonanza **
  1. Bonanza: The Movie (1988) (TV)
  2. Back to Bonanza (1993) (TV)
  3. Bonanza: The Return (1993) (TV)
  4. Bonanza: Under Attack (1995) (TV)
  5. Bonanza: The Next Generation (1995) (TV)
- Born Free *
  1. Born Free (1966)
  2. The Lions Are Free (1969)
  3. Living Free (1972)
  4. Born Free: A New Adventure (1995) (TV)
  5. To Walk with Lions (1999)
- Bouboule
  1. Le Roi des resquilleurs (1930)
  2. Le Roi du cirage (1931)
  3. La Bande à Bouboule (1931)
  4. Bouboule Ier, roi nègre (1933)
  5. Prince Bouboule (1939)
- Bullyparade *
  1. Der Schuh des Manitu (2001)
  2. Traumschiff Surprise – Periode 1 (2004)
  3. Lissi und der wilde Kaiser (2007)
  4. Bullyparade: The Movie (2017)
  5. Das Kanu des Manitu (2025)
- Jiggs and Maggie (from Bringing Up Father)
  1. Bringing Up Father (1946)
  2. Jiggs and Maggie in Society (1947)
  3. Jiggs and Maggie in Court (1948)
  4. Jiggs and Maggie in Jackpot Jitters (1949)
  5. Jiggs and Maggie Out West (1950)

== C ==
- Critters *
  1. Critters (1986)
  2. Critters 2: The Main Course (1988)
  3. Critters 3 (1991) (V)
  4. Critters 4 (1992) (V)
  5. Critters Attack! (2019) (V) (reboot)
- The Crow *
  1. The Crow (1994)
  2. The Crow: City of Angels (1996)
  3. The Crow: Salvation (2000) (V)
  4. The Crow: Wicked Prayer (2005) (V)
  5. The Crow (2024) (reboot)
- Casper (a) ****
  1. Casper (1995)
  2. Casper: A Spirited Beginning (1997) (V) (prequel)
  3. Casper Meets Wendy (1998) (V) (prequel)
  4. Casper's Haunted Christmas (2000) (A) (V)
  5. Casper's Scare School (2006) (A) (V)
- Cars (A)
  1. Cars (2006)
  2. Cars 2 (2011)
  3. Planes (2013) (spin-off)
  4. Planes: Fire & Rescue (2014) (spin-off)
  5. Cars 3 (2017)
- Cagney & Lacey *
  1. Cagney & Lacey (1981) (TV) (Pilot of the TV series)
  2. Cagney & Lacey: The Return (1994) (TV)
  3. Cagney & Lacey: Together Again (1995) (TV)
  4. Cagney & Lacey: The View Through the Glass Ceiling (1995) (TV)
  5. Cagney & Lacey: True Convictions (1996) (TV)
- Çakallarla Dans
  1. Çakallarla Dans (2010)
  2. Çakallarla Dans 2: Hastasıyız Dede (2012)
  3. Çakallarla Dans 3: Sıfır Sıkıntı (2014)
  4. Çakallarla Dans 4 (2016)
  5. Çakallarla Dans 5 (2018)
- Captain Barbell **
  1. Captain Barbell (1964)
  2. Captain Barbell Kontra Captain Bakal (1965)
  3. Mars Ravelo's Captain Barbell Boom! (1973)
  4. Captain Barbell (1986)
  5. Captain Barbell (2003)
- Chandler Christmas
  1. Marry Me for Christmas (2013) (TV)
  2. Marry Us for Christmas (2014) (TV)
  3. A Baby for Christmas (2015) (TV)
  4. Merry Christmas, Baby (2016) (TV)
  5. Chandler Christmas Getaway (2018) (TV)
- Clyde Beatty
  1. The Big Cage (1933)
  2. The Lost Jungle (1934) (Serial)
  3. Darkest Africa (1936) (Serial)
  4. Perils of the Jungle (1953)
  5. Ring of Fear (1954)
- The Cremaster Cycle
  1. Cremaster 4 (1995)
  2. Cremaster 1 (1996)
  3. Cremaster 5 (1997)
  4. Cremaster 2 (1999)
  5. Cremaster 3 (2002)

== D ==
- Dirty Harry
  1. Dirty Harry (1971)
  2. Magnum Force (1973)
  3. The Enforcer (1976)
  4. Sudden Impact (1983)
  5. The Dead Pool (1988)
- Dennis the Menace (a) ***
  1. Dennis the Menace: Dinosaur Hunter (1987) (TV)
  2. Dennis the Menace (1993)
  3. Dennis the Menace Strikes Again (1998) (V)
  4. Dennis the Menace in Cruise Control (2002) (A) (TV)
  5. A Dennis the Menace Christmas (2007) (V)
- Die Hard
  1. Die Hard (1988)
  2. Die Hard 2 (1990)
  3. Die Hard with a Vengeance (1995)
  4. Live Free or Die Hard (2007)
  5. A Good Day to Die Hard (2013)
- Dragonheart
  1. Dragonheart (1996)
  2. Dragonheart: A New Beginning (2000) (V)
  3. Dragonheart 3: The Sorcerer's Curse (2015) (V) (prequel)
  4. Dragonheart: Battle for the Heartfire (2017) (V) (prequel)
  5. Dragonheart: Vengeance (2019) (V) (prequel)
- Descendants **
1. Descendants (2015) (TV)
2. Descendants 2 (2017) (TV)
3. Descendants 3 (2019) (TV)
4. Descendants: The Rise of Red (2024) (TV)
5. Descendants: Wicked Wonderland (2026) (TV)
- Don Camillo
  1. The Little World of Don Camillo (1952)
  2. The Return of Don Camillo (1953)
  3. Don Camillo's Last Round (1955)
  4. Don Camillo: Monsignor (1961)
  5. Don Camillo in Moscow (1965)
- Dick Tracy
1. Dick Tracy (1945)
2. Dick Tracy vs. Cueball (1946)
3. Dick Tracy's Dilemma (1947)
4. Dick Tracy Meets Gruesome (1947)
5. Dick Tracy (1990)

== F ==
- The Fly
  1. The Fly (1958)
  2. Return of the Fly (1959)
  3. Curse of the Fly (1965)
  4. The Fly (1986) (remake)
  5. The Fly II (1989) (remake)
- Fantaghirò *
  1. Fantaghirò (1991)
  2. Fantaghirò 2 (1992)
  3. Fantaghirò 3 (1993)
  4. Fantaghirò 4 (1994)
  5. Fantaghirò 5 (1996)
- Fantastic Four
  1. The Fantastic Four (1994) (standalone film)
  2. Fantastic Four (2005)
  3. Fantastic Four: Rise of the Silver Surfer (2007)
  4. Fantastic Four (2015) (reboot)
  5. The Fantastic Four: First Steps (2025) (reboot)
- Famous Five
  1. Famous Five (2012)
  2. Famous Five 2 (2013)
  3. Famous Five 3 (2014)
  4. Famous Five 4 (2015)
  5. The Famous Five and the Valley of Dinosaurs (2018)
- Freaky Friday
  1. Freaky Friday (1976)
  2. Freaky Friday (1995) (TV)
  3. Freaky Friday (2003)
  4. Freaky Friday (2018) (TV)
  5. Freakier Friday (2025)
- Fantômas (Silent serials)
  1. Fantômas (1913)
  2. Juve Contre Fantômas (1913)
  3. Le Mort Qui Tue (1913)
  4. Fantômas contre Fantômas (1914)
  5. Le Faux Magistrat (1914)
- Frosty the Snowman (A)
  1. Frosty the Snowman (1969) (TV)
  2. Frosty's Winter Wonderland (1976) (TV)
  3. Rudolph and Frosty's Christmas in July (1979) (TV)
  4. Frosty Returns (1992) (TV)
  5. The Legend of Frosty the Snowman (2005) (V)
- Fu Manchu (Christopher Lee series)
  1. The Face of Fu Manchu (1965)
  2. The Brides of Fu Manchu (1966)
  3. The Vengeance of Fu Manchu (1967)
  4. The Blood of Fu Manchu (1968)
  5. The Castle of Fu Manchu (1969)

== G ==
- Ghostbusters **
1. Ghostbusters (1984)
2. Ghostbusters II (1989)
3. Ghostbusters (2016) (reboot)
4. Ghostbusters: Afterlife (2021)
5. Ghostbusters: Frozen Empire (2024)
- God's Not Dead
1. God's Not Dead (2014)
2. God's Not Dead 2: He's Surely Alive (2016)
3. God's Not Dead: A Light in Darkness (2018)
4. God's Not Dead: We the People (2021)
5. God's Not Dead: In God We Trust (2024)
- Gamma I
1. Wild, Wild Planet (I criminali della galassia) (1965)
2. War of the Planets (I diafanoidi vengono da Marte) (1966)
3. War Between the Planets (Il pianeta errante) (1966)
4. Snow Devils (La morte viene dal pianeta Aytin) (1967)
5. The Green Slime (1968)
- The Gambler
1. Kenny Rogers as The Gambler (1980) (TV)
2. Kenny Rogers as The Gambler: The Adventure Continues (1983) (TV)
3. Kenny Rogers as The Gambler, Part III: The Legend Continues (1987) (TV)
4. The Gambler Returns: The Luck of the Draw (1991) (TV)
5. Gambler V: Playing for Keeps (1994) (TV)
- Gar el Hama
1. Dr. Gar el Hama (1911)
2. Dr. Gar el Hamas Flugt (1912)
3. Gar el Hama III (1914)
4. Gar el Hama IV (1916)
5. Gar el Hama V (1918)
- The Gods Must Be Crazy
1. The Gods Must Be Crazy (1980)
2. The Gods Must Be Crazy II (1988)
3. Crazy Safari (1991)
4. Crazy Hong Kong (1993)
5. The Gods Must Be Funny in China (1994)
- Goliath
1. Terror dei Barbari (Terror of the Barbarians) (1959)
2. Golia contro i giganti (Goliath Against the Giants) (1960)
3. Golia e la schiava ribelle (Goliath and the Rebel Slave) (1963)
4. Golia e il cavaliere mascherato (Goliath and the Masked Rider) (1963)
5. Golia alla conquista di Bagdad (Goliath at the Conquest of Baghdad) (1964)
- Gunsmoke *
1. Gunsmoke: Return to Dodge (1987) (TV)
2. Gunsmoke: The Last Apache (1990) (TV)
3. Gunsmoke: To the Last Man (1992) (TV)
4. Gunsmoke: The Long Ride (1993) (TV)
5. Gunsmoke: One Man's Justice (1994) (TV)

== H ==
- Hannibal Lecter *
  1. Manhunter (1986) (standalone film)
  2. The Silence of the Lambs (1991)
  3. Hannibal (2001)
  4. Red Dragon (2002) (prequel)
  5. Hannibal Rising (2007) (prequel)
- Housefull
  1. Housefull (2010)
  2. Housefull 2 (2012)
  3. Housefull 3 (2016)
  4. Housefull 4 (2019)
  5. Housefull 5 (2025)
- Harry Palmer
  1. The Ipcress File (1965)
  2. Funeral in Berlin (1966)
  3. Billion Dollar Brain (1967)
  4. Bullet to Beijing (1995) (TV)
  5. Midnight in Saint Petersburg (1996) (TV)
- Henry Latham
  1. Henry, the Rainmaker (1949)
  2. Leave It to Henry (1949)
  3. Father Makes Good (1950)
  4. Father's Wild Game (1950)
  5. Father Takes the Air (1951)

== I ==
- Indiana Jones *
  1. Raiders of the Lost Ark (1981)
  2. Indiana Jones and the Temple of Doom (1984) (prequel)
  3. Indiana Jones and the Last Crusade (1989)
  4. Indiana Jones and the Kingdom of the Crystal Skull (2008)
  5. Indiana Jones and the Dial of Destiny (2023)
- Ip Man
  1. Ip Man (2008)
  2. Ip Man 2 (2010)
  3. Ip Man 3 (2015)
  4. Master Z: The Ip Man Legacy (2018) (spin-off)
  5. Ip Man 4 (2019)
- Immenhof *
  1. The Immenhof Girls (1955)
  2. Hochzeit auf Immenhof (1956)
  3. Ferien auf Immenhof (1957)
  4. Die Zwillinge vom Immenhof (1973)
  5. Frühling auf Immenhof (1974)
- International Secret Police
  1. Interpol Code 8 (1963)
  2. International Secret Police: Fangs of the Tiger (1964)
  3. A Keg of Powder (1964)
  4. Key of Keys (1965)

== J ==
- Jumanji *
  1. Jumanji (1995)
  2. Zathura: A Space Adventure (2005) (spin-off)
  3. Jumanji: Welcome to the Jungle (2017)
  4. Jumanji: The Next Level (2019)
  5. Jumanji: Open World (2026)
- John Wick *
  1. John Wick (2014)
  2. John Wick: Chapter 2 (2017)
  3. John Wick: Chapter 3 – Parabellum (2019)
  4. John Wick: Chapter 4 (2023)
  5. Ballerina (2025) (spin-off)
- Jak svet prichází o básníky
  1. Jak svet prichází o básníky (1982)
  2. Jak basnici prichazeji o iluze (1983)
  3. Jak básníkum chutná zivot (1988)
  4. Konec básníků v Čechách (1993)
  5. Jak básníci neztrácejí nadeji (2004)
- Jimmy Neutron **
  1. Jimmy Neutron: Boy Genius (2001)
  2. Jimmy Neutron: The Egg-pire Strikes Back (2003) (TV)
  3. Jimmy Neutron: Rescue Jet Fusion (2003) (TV)
  4. Jimmy Neutron: Win, Lose, and Kaboom (2004) (TV)
  5. Jimmy Neutron: The League of Villains (2005) (TV)
- John and Kajsa Hillman
  1. Damen i svart (1958)
  2. Mannekäng i rött (1958)
  3. Ryttare i blått (1959)
  4. Vita frun (1962)
  5. Den gula bilen (1963)

== L ==
- Lassie (based on the 1954 TV series) ** (a)
1. Lassie's Great Adventure (1963)
2. The Adventures of Neeka (1968) (TV)
3. Peace Is Our Profession (1970) (TV)
4. Well of Love (1970) (TV)
5. Joyous Sound (1973) (TV)
- Lausbubengeschichten
1. Tales of a Young Scamp (1964)
2. Aunt Frieda (1965)
3. Onkel Filser – Allerneueste Lausbubengeschichten (1966)
4. When Ludwig Goes on Manoeuvres (1967)
5. Ludwig auf Freiersfüßen (1969)
- Les Boys *
1. Les Boys (1997)
2. Les Boys II (1998)
3. Les Boys III (2001)
4. Les Boys IV (2005)
5. When We Were Boys (2013)

== M ==
- The Magnificent Seven **
  1. The Magnificent Seven (1960)
  2. Return of the Seven (1966)
  3. Guns of the Magnificent Seven (1969)
  4. The Magnificent Seven Ride! (1972)
  5. The Magnificent Seven (2016) (remake)
- Mad Max
  1. Mad Max (1979)
  2. Mad Max 2 (1981)
  3. Mad Max Beyond Thunderdome (1985)
  4. Mad Max: Fury Road (2015) (reboot)
  5. Furiosa: A Mad Max Saga (2024) (spin-off)
- Masters of the Universe (a) *******
  1. The Secret of the Sword (1985) (A)
  2. He-Man & She-Ra: A Christmas Special (1985) (A) (TV)
  3. Skeletor's Revenge (1986) (A) (V)
  4. Masters of the Universe (1987)
  5. Masters of the Universe (2026) (reboot)
- Mr. Vampire
  1. Mr. Vampire (1985)
  2. Mr. Vampire II (1986)
  3. Mr. Vampire III (1987)
  4. Mr. Vampire IV (1988)
  5. Mr. Vampire 1992 (1992) (retcon)
- Mega Shark
  1. Mega Shark Versus Giant Octopus (2009) (V)
  2. Mega Shark Versus Crocosaurus (2010) (V)
  3. Mega Shark Versus Mecha Shark (2014) (V)
  4. Mega Shark Versus Kolossus (2015) (V)
  5. 2025 Armageddon (2022) (V) (crossover)
- Mobile Suit Gundam (A)
  1. Mobile Suit Gundam (1981)
  2. Mobile Suit Gundam II: Soldiers of Sorrow (1981)
  3. Mobile Suit Gundam III: Encounters in Space (1982)
  4. Mobile Suit Gundam: Char's Counterattack (1988)
  5. Mobile Suit Gundam F91 (1991)
- Monty Python *
  1. Monty Python's And Now For Something Completely Different (1974)
  2. Monty Python and the Holy Grail (1975)
  3. Monty Python's Life of Brian (1979)
  4. Monty Python Live at the Hollywood Bowl (1982)
  5. Monty Python's The Meaning of Life (1983)
- Mr. Wong
  1. Mr. Wong (1961)
  2. Mr. Wong vs. Mistico (1964)
  3. Mr. Wong and the Bionic Girls (1977)
  4. Mr. Wong Meets Jesse & James (1982)
  5. Legend of the Lost Dragon (1989)
- The Munsters (a) **
  1. Munster, Go Home! (1966)
  2. The Mini-Munsters (1973) (A) (TV)
  3. The Munsters' Revenge (1981) (TV)
  4. Here Come the Munsters (1995) (TV)
  5. The Munsters' Scary Little Christmas (1996) (TV)
- Murder, She Baked
  1. A Chocolate Chip Cookie Mystery (2015) (TV)
  2. A Plum Pudding Mystery (2015) (TV)
  3. A Peach Cobbler Mystery (2016) (TV)
  4. A Deadly Recipe (2016) (TV)
  5. Just Desserts (2017) (TV)
- Murder, She Wrote **
  1. The Murder of Sherlock Holmes (1984) (TV)
  2. Murder, She Wrote: South by Southwest (1997) (TV)
  3. Murder, She Wrote: A Story to Die For (2000) (TV)
  4. Murder, She Wrote: The Last Free Man (2001) (TV)
  5. Murder, She Wrote: The Celtic Riddle (2003) (TV)
- Mythica
  1. Mythica: A Quest for Heroes (2014)
  2. Mythica: The Darkspore (2015)
  3. Mythica: The Necromancer (2015)
  4. Mythica: The Iron Crown (2016)
  5. Mythica: The Godslayer (2016)

== N ==
- Nurses
  1. The Student Nurses (1970) (V)
  2. Private Duty Nurses (1971) (V)
  3. Night Call Nurses (1972) (V)
  4. The Young Nurses (1973) (V)
  5. Candy Stripe Nurses (1974) (V)
- Nemesis
  1. Nemesis (1992) (V)
  2. Nemesis 2: Nebula (1995) (V)
  3. Nemesis 3: Prey Harder (1996) (V)
  4. Nemesis 4: Death Angel (1996) (V)
  5. Nemesis 5: The New Model (2017) (V)
- Nestor Burma *
  1. 120, rue de la Gare (1946)
  2. La Nuit d'Austerlitz (1954) (TV)
  3. La Nuit de Saint-Germain-des-Prés (1977)
  4. Nestor Burma, détective de choc (1981)
  5. Les Rats de Montsouris (1988) (TV)
- Neutrón
  1. Neutrón, el Enmascarado Negro (1960)
  2. Los autómatas de la muerte (1960)
  3. Neutrón contra el doctor Caronte (1960)
  4. Neutrón contra el criminal sádico (1964)
  5. Neutrón contra los asesinos del karate (1965)
- Nick Carter (German series)
  1. The Inheritance from New York (1919)
  2. The Hotel in Chicago (1921)
  3. Only One Night (1922)
  4. Der Passagier in der Zwangsjacke (1922)
  5. Frauen, die die Ehe brechen (1922)

== O ==
- Operation Delta Force
  1. Operation Delta Force (1997) (TV)
  2. Operation Delta Force 2: Mayday (1998) (TV)
  3. Operation Delta Force 3: Clear Target (1999) (V)
  4. Operation Delta Force 4: Deep Fault (1999) (V)
  5. Operation Delta Force 5: Random Fire (2005) (V)
- The Original Kings of Comedy *
  1. The Original Kings of Comedy (2000)
  2. The Queens of Comedy (2001) (V)
  3. The Original Latin Kings of Comedy (2002)
  4. Kims of Comedy (2005) (TV)
  5. The Comedians of Comedy (2005)
- Otto
  1. Otto – Der Film (1985)
  2. Otto: The New Movie (1987)
  3. Otto: The Alien from East Frisia (1989)
  4. Otto – Der Liebesfilm (1992)
  5. Otto – Der Katastrofenfilm (2000)

== P ==
- The Parent Trap
  1. The Parent Trap (1961)
  2. The Parent Trap II (1986) (TV)
  3. Parent Trap III (1989) (TV)
  4. Parent Trap: Hawaiian Honeymoon (1989) (TV)
  5. The Parent Trap (1998) (remake)
- Peanuts (A) ****
  1. A Boy Named Charlie Brown (1969)
  2. Snoopy Come Home (1972)
  3. Race for Your Life, Charlie Brown (1977)
  4. Bon Voyage, Charlie Brown (and Don't Come Back!) (1980)
  5. The Peanuts Movie (2015)
- The Past-Master
  1. The Past-Master (1970)
  2. The Past-Master on Excursion (1980)
  3. The Past-Master-Farmer (1981)
  4. The Past-Master at the Seaside (1982)
  5. The Past-Master - Boss (1983)
- Piranha
  1. Piranha (1978)
  2. Piranha II: The Spawning (1982)
  3. Piranha (1995) (TV) (remake)
  4. Piranha 3D (2010) (remake)
  5. Piranha 3DD (2012) (V) (remake)
- Phantasm
  1. Phantasm (1979)
  2. Phantasm II (1988)
  3. Phantasm III: Lord of the Dead (1994) (V)
  4. Phantasm IV: Oblivion (1998) (V)
  5. Phantasm: Ravager (2016)
- Prom Night
  1. Prom Night (1980)
  2. Hello Mary Lou: Prom Night II (1987)
  3. Prom Night III: The Last Kiss (1990) (V)
  4. Prom Night IV: Deliver Us from Evil (1992) (V)
  5. Prom Night (2008) (remake)
- The Punisher (a) *
  1. The Punisher (1989) (V)
  2. The Punisher (2004) (reboot)
  3. Punisher: War Zone (2008) (reboot)
  4. Avengers Confidential: Black Widow & Punisher (2014) (A) (V)
  5. The Punisher: One Last Kill (2026) (TV) (reboot)
- The Prophecy
  1. The Prophecy (1995)
  2. The Prophecy II (1998) (V)
  3. The Prophecy 3: The Ascent (2000) (V)
  4. The Prophecy: Uprising (2005) (V)
  5. The Prophecy: Forsaken (2005) (V)
- Pusher
  1. Pusher (1996)
  2. Pusher II (2004)
  3. Pusher 3 (2005)
  4. Pusher (2010) (remake)
  5. Pusher (2012) (remake)
- Pirates of the Caribbean
  1. Pirates of the Caribbean: The Curse of the Black Pearl (2003)
  2. Pirates of the Caribbean: Dead Man's Chest (2006)
  3. Pirates of the Caribbean: At World's End (2007)
  4. Pirates of the Caribbean: On Stranger Tides (2011)
  5. Pirates of the Caribbean: Dead Men Tell No Tales (2017)
- The Purge
  1. The Purge (2013)
  2. The Purge: Anarchy (2014)
  3. The Purge: Election Year (2016)
  4. The First Purge (2018) (prequel)
  5. The Forever Purge (2021)

== R ==
- Rabun
  1. Rabun (2003)
  2. Sepet (2004)
  3. Gubra (2006)
  4. Mukhsin (2007)
  5. Muallaf (2008)

== S ==
- Shaft *
  1. Shaft (1971)
  2. Shaft's Big Score! (1972)
  3. Shaft in Africa (1973)
  4. Shaft (2000) (retcon)
  5. Shaft (2019) (retcon)
- Scanners
  1. Scanners (1981)
  2. Scanners II: The New Order (1991) (V)
  3. Scanners III: The Takeover (1992) (V)
  4. Scanner Cop (1994) (V) (spin-off)
  5. Scanners: The Showdown (1995) (V) (spin-off)
- Sleepaway Camp
  1. Sleepaway Camp (1983)
  2. Sleepaway Camp II: Unhappy Campers (1988) (V)
  3. Sleepaway Camp III: Teenage Wasteland (1989) (V)
  4. Return to Sleepaway Camp (2008) (V) (retcon)
  5. Sleepaway Camp IV: The Survivor (2012) (V)
- The Stepfather
  1. The Stepfather (1987)
  2. Stepfather II (1989) (V)
  3. Stepfather III (1992) (TV)
  4. The Stepfather (2009) (remake)
  5. Stepfather (2026) (remake)
- Sailor Moon (A) **
  1. Sailor Moon R: The Movie (1993)
  2. Sailor Moon S: The Movie (1994)
  3. Sailor Moon Super S: The Movie (1995)
  4. Sailor Moon Eternal (2021)
  5. Sailor Moon Cosmos (2023)
- Starship Troopers (a) **
  1. Starship Troopers (1997)
  2. Starship Troopers 2: Hero of the Federation (2004) (TV)
  3. Starship Troopers 3: Marauder (2008) (V)
  4. Starship Troopers: Invasion (2012) (A) (V)
  5. Starship Troopers: Traitor of Mars (2017) (A) (V)
- Spy Kids *
  1. Spy Kids (2001)
  2. Spy Kids 2: The Island of Lost Dreams (2002)
  3. Spy Kids 3-D: Game Over (2003)
  4. Spy Kids: All the Time in the World (2011)
  5. Spy Kids: Armageddon (2023)
- The Strangers
  1. The Strangers (2008)
  2. The Strangers: Prey at Night (2018)
  3. The Strangers: Chapter 1 (2024) (reboot)
  4. The Strangers – Chapter 2 (2025) (reboot)
  5. The Strangers – Chapter 3 (2026) (reboot)
- Sällskapsresan
  1. Sällskapsresan (1980)
  2. Sällskapsresan 2 - Snowroller (1985)
  3. S.O.S. - En segelsällskapsresa (1988)
  4. Den ofrivillige golfaren (1991)
  5. Hälsoresan – En smal film av stor vikt (1999)
- Samson
  1. Sansone (Samson) (1961)
  2. Sansone contro i pirati (Samson Vs. The Pirates) (1963)
  3. Ercole sfida Sansone (Hercules Challenges Samson) (1963)
  4. Sansone contro il corsaro nero (Samson Vs. the Black Pirate) (1963)
  5. Ercole, Sansone, Maciste e Ursus gli invincibili (Hercules, Samson, Maciste and Ursus: the Invincibles) (1964) (aka Combate dei Gigantes)
- Sherlock Holmes (1931 film series) (Note: A series of films where the titular character is portrayed by Arthur Wontner.)
  1. The Sleeping Cardinal (1931)
  2. The Missing Rembrandt (1932)
  3. The Sign of Four (1932)
  4. The Triumph of Sherlock Holmes (1935)
  5. Silver Blaze (1937)
- Superbug
  1. Superbug Goes Wild (Ein Käfer geht aufs Ganze) (1971)
  2. Superbug, Super Agent (Ein Käfer gibt Vollgas) (1972)
  3. Superbug Rides Again (Ein Käfer auf Extratour) (1973)
  4. The Maddest Car in the World (Das verrückteste Auto der Welt) (1975)
  5. Return of Superbug (Zwei tolle Käfer räumen auf) (1978)

== T ==
- The Toxic Avenger *
  1. The Toxic Avenger (1985)
  2. The Toxic Avenger Part II (1989)
  3. The Toxic Avenger Part III: The Last Temptation of Toxie (1989)
  4. Citizen Toxie: The Toxic Avenger IV (2000)
  5. The Toxic Avenger (2023) (reboot)
- The Twilight Saga
  1. Twilight (2008)
  2. The Twilight Saga: New Moon (2009)
  3. The Twilight Saga: Eclipse (2010)
  4. The Twilight Saga: Breaking Dawn – Part 1 (2011)
  5. The Twilight Saga: Breaking Dawn – Part 2 (2012)
- Tarkan
  1. Tarkan (1969)
  2. Tarkan: Gümüş Eyer (1970)
  3. Tarkan Versus the Vikings (1971)
  4. Tarkan: Altın Madalyon (1972)
  5. Tarkan: Güçlü Kahraman (1973)
- The Three Musketeers (1954–1959) (Note: A series where the titular characters are portrayed by Jeffrey Stone, Paul Campbell, Sebastian Cabot and Domenico Modugno.) *
  1. Knights of the Queen (1954)
  2. The King's Musketeers (1957)
  3. La spada imbattibile (1957)
  4. Le imprese di una spada leggendaria (1958)
  5. Mantelli e spade insanguinate (1959)
- Tom Wade
  1. Cheyenne Rides Again (1937)
  2. Feud of the Trail (1937)
  3. Mystery Range (1937)
  4. Brothers of the West (1937)
  5. Lost Ranch (1937)
- Torrente
  1. Torrente, el brazo tonto de la ley (1998)
  2. Torrente 2: Misión en Marbella (2001)
  3. Torrente 3: El protector (2005)
  4. Torrente 4: Lethal Crisis (2011)
  5. Torrente 5: Operación Eurovegas (2014)
- Touch (A) *
  1. Touch: Sebangō no Nai Ace (1986)
  2. Touch 2: Sayonara no Okurimono (1986)
  3. Touch 3: Kimi ga Tōri Sugita Ato ni (1987)
  4. Touch: Miss Lonely Yesterday (1998) (TV)
  5. Touch: Cross Road (2001) (TV)
- Truth or Dare?
  1. Truth or Dare? (1986)
  2. Wicked Games (1994)
  3. Screaming for Sanity: Truth or Dare 3 (1998)
  4. Deadly Dares: Truth or Dare Part IV (2011)
  5. I Dared You! Truth or Dare Part 5 (2017)

== U ==
- Underworld
  1. Underworld (2003)
  2. Underworld: Evolution (2006)
  3. Underworld: Rise of the Lycans (2009) (prequel)
  4. Underworld: Awakening (2012)
  5. Underworld: Blood Wars (2016)
- Üç Harfliler
  1. Üç Harfliler: Marid (2010)
  2. Üç Harfliler 2: Hablis (2015)
  3. Üç Harfliler 3: Karabüyü (2016)
  4. Beddua: The Curse (2018)
  5. Üç Harfliler: Adak (2019)

== V ==
- Valley of the Wolves ***
  1. Valley of the Wolves: Iraq (2006)
  2. Muro: Damn the Humanist Inside (2008) (spin-off)
  3. Valley of the Wolves: Gladio (2009)
  4. Valley of the Wolves: Palestine (2011)
  5. Valley of the Wolves: Homeland (2017)
- Van der Valk *
  1. Amsterdam Affair (1968)
  2. Van der Valk und das Mädchen (1972) (TV)
  3. Because of the Cats (1973)
  4. Van der Valk und die Reichen (1973) (TV)
  5. Le bouc émissaire (1975) (TV)
- Vi på Saltkråkan **
  1. Tjorven, Båtsman och Moses (1964)
  2. Tjorven och Skrållan (1965)
  3. Tjorven och Mysak (1966)
  4. Skrållan, Ruskprick och Knorrhane (1967)
  5. Vi på Saltkråkan (1968)

== W ==
- The Wolf Man (Universal)
  1. The Wolf Man (1941)
  2. Frankenstein Meets the Wolf Man (1943)
  3. House of Frankenstein (1944)
  4. House of Dracula (1945)
  5. Abbott and Costello Meet Frankenstein (1948)
- Witch Mountain *
1. Escape to Witch Mountain (1975)
2. Return from Witch Mountain (1978)
3. Beyond Witch Mountain (1982) (TV)
4. Escape to Witch Mountain (1995) (TV) (remake)
5. Race to Witch Mountain (2009) (reboot)
- Windstorm
1. Windstorm (2013)
2. Windstorm 2 (2015)
3. Windstorm and the Wild Horses (2017)
4. Windstorm 4: Ari's Arrival (2019)
5. Windstorm 5 (2021)
- Wedding March
  1. The Wedding March (2016) (TV)
  2. Wedding March 2: Resorting to Love (2017) (TV)
  3. Wedding March 3: A Valentine Wedding (2018) (TV)
  4. Wedding March 4: Something Old, Something New (2018) (TV)
  5. My Boyfriend's Back: Wedding March 5 (2019) (TV)
- Werner
  1. Werner – Beinhart! (1990)
  2. Werner: Eat My Dust!!! (1996)
  3. Werner – Volles Rooäää!!! (1999)
  4. Werner – Gekotzt wird später! (2003)
  5. Werner – Eiskalt! (2011)

== Z ==
- Zorro (serials)
  1. Zorro Rides Again (1937)
  2. Zorro's Fighting Legion (1939)
  3. Zorro's Black Whip (1944)
  4. Son of Zorro (1947)
  5. Ghost of Zorro (1949)
- Zombies
  1. Zombies (2018) (TV)
  2. Zombies 2 (2020) (TV)
  3. Zombies 3 (2022) (TV)
  4. Zombies 4: Dawn of the Vampires (2025) (TV)
  5. Zombies 5: Secrets of the Sea (2027) (TV)
- Zur Sache, Schätzchen
  1. Go for It, Baby (1968)
  2. Don't Fumble, Darling (1970)
  3. Hau drauf, Kleiner (1974)
  4. Beware of Schwarzenbeck (1979)
  5. Mit mir nicht, du Knallkopp (1983)
