= List of Touch episodes =

List of Touch episodes could refer to:

- List of Touch anime episodes, episodes from the 1985 anime television series based on the Mitsuru Adachi manga
- Touch (American TV series), episodes from the 2012 American television series
