= Nick Carter (character) =

Fictional detective

- First appearance: The Old Detective's Pupil; or, The Mysterious Crime of Madison Square (1886)
- Created by: Ormond G. Smith, John R. Coryell
- Portrayed by: Pierre Bressol; Walter Pidgeon; Lon Clark; Eddie Constantine; Robert Conrad; Michal Dočolomanský

In-universe information
- Gender: Male
- Occupation: Detective

Nick Carter is a fictional character who began as a dime novel private detective in 1886 and has appeared in a variety of formats over more than a century. The character was first conceived by Ormond G. Smith and created by John R. Coryell. Carter headlined his own magazine for years, and was then part of a long-running series of novels from 1964 to 1990. Movies were created based on Carter in France, Czechoslovakia, and the United States. Nick Carter has also featured in many comic books and in radio programs.

== Literary history ==
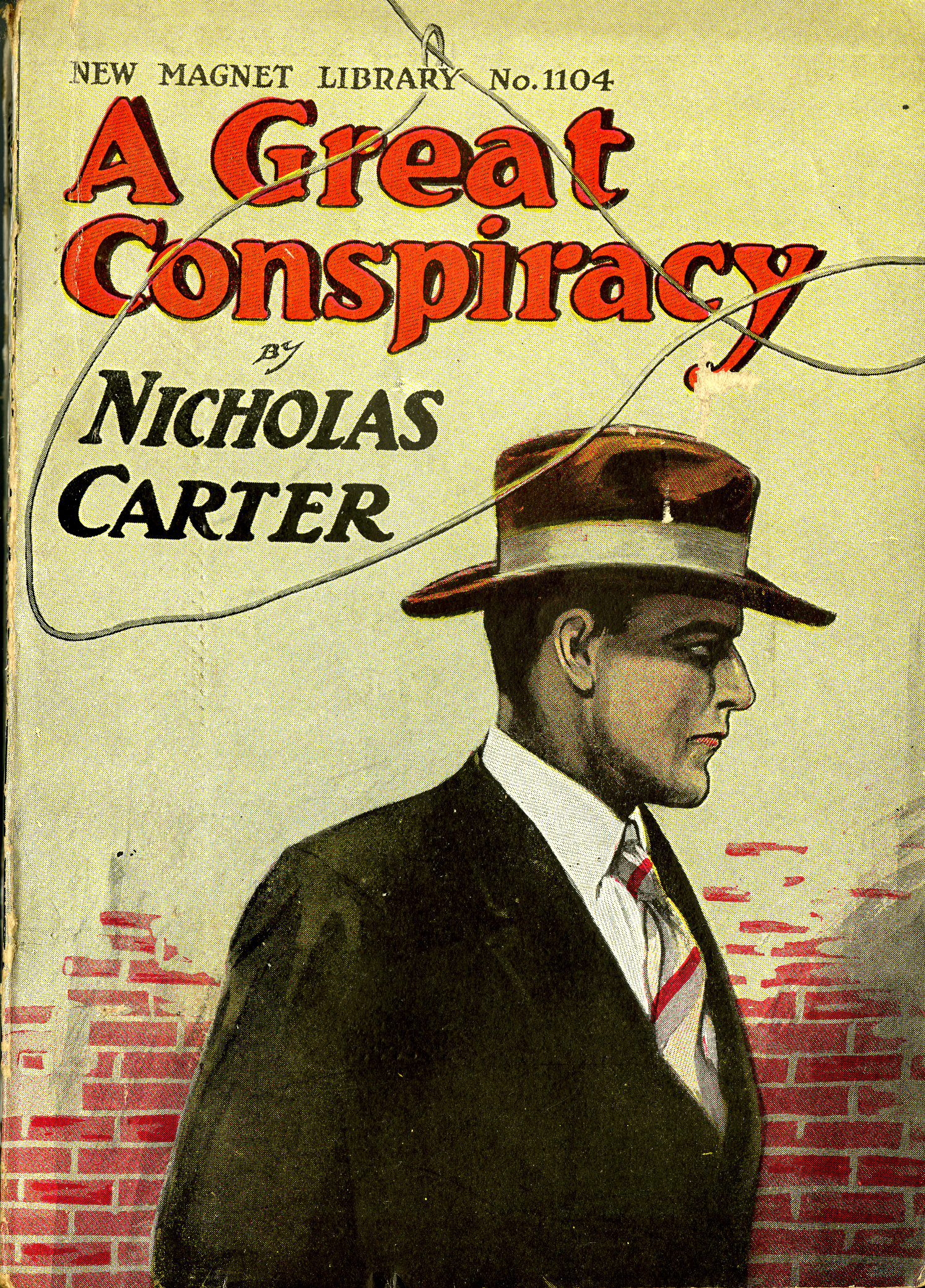
From The New Magnet Library Collection at The George Peabody Library.

Nick Carter first appeared in the story paper New York Weekly (Vol. 41 No. 46, September 18, 1886) in a 13-week serial, "The Old Detective's Pupil; or, The Mysterious Crime of Madison Square"; the character was conceived by Ormond G. Smith, the son of one of the founders of Street & Smith, and realized by John R. Coryell. Coryell retired from writing Nick Carter novels and the series was taken over by Frederick Van Rensselaer Dey, who wrote 1,076 novels and stories from 1890 until his suicide in 1922. The character proved popular enough to headline its own magazine, Nick Carter Weekly. The serialized stories in Nick Carter Weekly were also reprinted as stand-alone titles with the imprint of New Magnet Library. By 1915, Nick Carter Weekly had ceased publication and Street & Smith had replaced it with Detective Story Magazine, which had a more varied cast of characters. There was a brief attempt at reviving Carter in 1924–27 in Detective Story Magazine, but it was not successful.

During the 1930s, due to the success of The Shadow and Doc Savage, Street & Smith revived Nick Carter in a pulp magazine (named Nick Carter Detective Magazine) that was published from 1933 to 1936. Since the Doc Savage character had basically been given Nick's background, Nick Carter was now given new characteristics. Novels featuring Carter continued to be published through the 1950s, by which time there was also a popular radio show, Nick Carter, Master Detective, which was broadcast by the Mutual Broadcasting System network from 1943 to 1955.

=== Killmaster revival ===
Due to the success of the James Bond series during the 1960s, the character was updated for a long-running series of novels featuring the adventures of secret agent Nick Carter, aka the Killmaster. The first book, Run Spy Run, was published in 1964 and more than 260 Nick Carter adventures were published until the series ended in 1990.

The 100th Killmaster novel — Nick Carter 100 — was accompanied by an essay concerning the 1890s version, and a short story featuring the character; that marked one of the few times the Killmaster series acknowledged its historical roots.

None of these Nick Carter series of books had author credits, although it is known that several of the earliest volumes were written by Michael Avallone, and that Valerie Moolman and New York Times bestselling author Gayle Lynds wrote others, making this the first series of its kind to be written in significant part by women. Bill Crider is another author identified with Nick Carter.

The Nick Carter name was treated as if it were a pseudonym, and many of the volumes were written in the first person.

== Authors ==
The works were published using the house pseudonyms "Nicholas Carter" and "Sergeant Ryan". Authors known to have contributed include the following:

- John R. Coryell (1848–1924)
- Frederick W. Davis (1858–1933), who wrote eight Nick Carter stories for The New Nick Carter Weekly in 1910 and 1912, as well as writing extensively under the pen name "Scott Campbell"
- Frederick Van Rensselaer Dey (1861–1922), who took his own life
- Thomas C. Harbaugh (1849–1924), who died penniless in the Miami County Home in Ohio
- George C. Jenks (1850-1929)
- Eugene T. Sawyer (1847–1924)
- Charles Westerbrook
- Richard Edward Wormser (1908–1977), who claimed to have written 17 Carter magazine stories published in 1932–33

Stories are also credited to Harrison Keith, the joint pseudonym of John A. L. Chambliss and Philip Clark, who both wrote for the franchise.

== Books ==
=== New Magnet Library ===
| Title | Series # | Project Gutenberg # |
|---|---|---|
| Nick Carter's Ghost Story | 154 | |
| In the Lap of Danger; or, The Bait That Failed to Lure | 458 | |
| The Great Spy System; or, Nick Carter's Promise to the President | 563 | |
| Wanted: A Clew | 850 | |
| A Tangled Skein | 851 | |
| The Bullion Mystery | 852 | |
| The Man of Riddles | 853 | |
| A Miscarriage of Justice | 854 | |
| The Gloved Hand | 855 | |
| Spoilers and the Spoils | 856 | |
| The Deeper Game | 857 | |
| Bolts from Blue Skies | 858 | |
| Unseen Foes | 859 | |
| Knaves in High Places | 860 | |
| The Microbe of Crime | 861 | |
| In the Toils of Fear | 862 | |
| A Heritage of Trouble | 863 | |
| Called to Account | 864 | |
| The Just and the Unjust | 865 | |
| Instinct at Fault | 866 | |
| A Rogue Worth Trapping | 867 | |
| A Rope of Slender Threads | 868 | |
| The Last Call | 869 | |
| The Spoils of Chance | 870 | |
| A Struggle With Destiny | 871 | |
| The Slave of Crime | 872 | |
| The Crook's Blind | 873 | |
| A Rascal of Quality | 874 | |
| With Shackles of Fire | 875 | |
| The Man Who Changed Faces | 876 | |
| The Fixed Alibi | 877 | |
| Out With the Tide | 878 | |
| The Soul Destroyers | 879 | |
| The Wages of Rascality | 880 | |
| Birds of Prey | 881 | |
| When Destruction Threatens | 882 | |
| The Keeper of Black Hounds | 883 | |
| The Door of Doubt | 884 | |
| The Wolf Within | 885 | |
| A Perilous Parole | 886 | |
| The Trail of the Fingerprints | 887 | |
| Dodging the Law | 888 | |
| A Crime in Paradise | 889 | |
| On the Ragged Edge | 890 | |
| The Red God of Tragedy | 891 | |
| The Man Who Paid | 892 | |
| The Blind Man's Daughter | 893 | |
| One Object in Life | 894 | |
| As a Crook Sows | 895 | |
| In Record Time | 896 | |
| Held in Suspense | 897 | |
| The $100 | 898 | |
| Just One Slip | 890 | |
| On a Million-dollar Trail | 900 | |
| A Weird Treasure | 901 | |
| The Middle Link | 902 | |
| To the Ends of the Earth | 903 | |
| When Honors Pall | 904 | |
| The Yellow Brand | 905 | |
| A New Serpent in Eden | 906 | |
| When Brave Men Tremble | 907 | |
| A Test of Courage | 908 | |
| Where Peril Beckons | 909 | |
| The Gargoni Girdle | 910 | |
| Rascals & Co. | 911 | |
| Too Late to Talk | 912 | |
| Satan's Apt Pupil | 913 | |
| The Girl Prisoner | 914 | |
| The Danger of Folly | 915 | |
| One Shipwreck Too Many | 916 | |
| Scourged by Fear | 917 | |
| The Red Plague | 918 | |
| Scoundrels Rampant | 919 | |
| From Clew to Clew | 920 | |
| When Rogues Conspire | 921 | |
| Twelve in a Grave | 922 | |
| The Great Opium Case | 923 | |
| A Conspiracy of Rumors | 924 | |
| A Klondike Claim | 925 | |
| The Evil Formula | 926 | |
| The Man of Many Faces | 927 | |
| The Great Enigma | 928 | |
| The Burden of Proof | 929 | |
| The Stolen Brain | 930 | 66740 |
| A Titled Counterfeiter | 931 | |
| The Magic Necklace | 932 | |
| 'Round the World for a Quarter | 933 | |
| Over the Edge of the World | 934 | |
| In the Grip of Fate | 935 | |
| The Case of Many Clews | 936 | |
| The Sealed Door | 937 | |
| Nick Carter and the Green Goods Men | 938 | |
| The Man Without a Will | 939 | |
| Tracked Across the Atlantic | 940 | |
| A Clew From the Unknown | 941 | |
| The Crime of a Countess | 942 | |
| A Mixed Up Mess | 943 | |
| The Great Money Order Swindle | 944 | |
| The Adder's Brood | 945 | |
| A Wall Street Haul | 946 | |
| For a Pawned Crown | 947 | |
| Sealed Orders | 948 | |
| The Hate That Kills | 949 | |
| The American Marquis | 950 | |
| The Needy Nine | 951 | |
| Fighting Against Millions | 952 | |
| Outlaws of the Blue | 953 | |
| The Old Detective's Pupil | 954 | |
| Found in the Jungle | 955 | |
| The Mysterious Mail Robbery | 956 | |
| Broken Bars | 957 | |
| A Fair Criminal | 958 | |
| Won by Magic | 959 | |
| The Piano Box Mystery | 960 | |
| The Man They Held Back | 961 | |
| A Millionaire Partner | 962 | |
| A Pressing Peril | 963 | |
| An Australian Klondyke | 964 | |
| The Sultan's Pearls | 965 | |
| The Double Shuffle Club | 966 | |
| Paying the Price | 967 | |
| A Woman's Hand | 968 | |
| A Network of Crime | 969 | |
| At Thompson's Ranch | 970 | |
| The Crossed Needles | 971 | |
| The Diamond Mine Case | 972 | |
| Blood Will Tell | 973 | |
| An Accidental Password | 974 | |
| The Crook's Bauble | 975 | |
| Two Plus Two | 976 | |
| The Yellow Label | 977 | |
| The Clever Celestial | 978 | |
| The Amphitheater Plot | 979 | |
| Gideon Drexel's Millions | 980 | |
| Death in Life | 981 | |
| A Stolen Identity | 982 | |
| Evidence by Telephone | 983 | |
| The Twelve Tin Boxes | 984 | |
| Clew Against Clew | 985 | |
| Lady Velvet | 986 | |
| Playing a Bold Game | 987 | |
| A Dead Man's Grip | 988 | |
| Snarled Identities; Or, A Desperate Tangle | 989 | 63977 |
| A Deposit Vault Puzzle | 990 | |
| The Crescent Brotherhood | 991 | |
| The Stolen Pay Train | 992 | |
| The Sea Fox | 993 | |
| Wanted by Two Clients | 994 | |
| The Van Alstine Case | 995 | |
| Check No. 777 | 996 | |
| Partners in Peril | 997 | |
| Nick Carter's Clever Protege | 998 | |
| The Sign of the Crossed Knives | 999 | |
| The Man Who Vanished | 1000 | |
| A Battle for the Right; Or, A Clash of Wits | 1001 | 62428 |
| A Game of Craft | 1002 | |
| Nick Carter's Retainer | 1003 | |
| Caught in the Toils | 1004 | |
| A Broken Bond; Or, The Man Without Morals | 1005 | 63143 |
| The Crime of the French Cafe | 1006 | 11989 |
| The Man Who Stole Millions | 1007 | |
| The Twelve Wise Men | 1008 | |
| Hidden Foes; Or, A Fatal Miscalculation | 1009 | 62860 |
| A Gamblers' Syndicate | 1010 | |
| A Chance Discovery | 1011 | |
| Among the Counterfeiters | 1012 | |
| A Threefold Disappearance | 1013 | |
| At Odds With Scotland Yard | 1014 | |
| A Princess of Crime | 1015 | |
| Found on the Beach | 1016 | |
| A Spinner of Death | 1017 | |
| The Detective's Pretty Neighbor | 1018 | |
| A Bogus Clew | 1019 | |
| The Puzzle of Five Pistols | 1020 | |
| The Secret of the Marble Mantel | 1021 | |
| A Bite of an Apple | 1022 | |
| A Triple Crime | 1023 | |
| The Stolen Race Horse | 1024 | |
| Wildfire | 1025 | |
| A Herald Personal | 1026 | |
| The Finger of Suspicion | 1027 | |
| The Crimson Clew | 1028 | |
| Nick Carter Down East | 1029 | |
| The Chain of Clews | 1030 | |
| A Victim of Circumstances | 1031 | |
| Brought to Bay | 1032 | |
| The Dynamite Trap | 1033 | |
| A Scrap of Black Lace | 1034 | |
| The Woman of Evil | 1035 | |
| A Legacy of Hate | 1036 | |
| A Trusted Rogue | 1037 | |
| Man Against Man | 1038 | |
| The Demons of the Night | 1039 | |
| The Brotherhood of Death | 1040 | |
| At the Knife's Point | 1041 | |
| A Cry for Help | 1042 | |
| A Stroke of Policy | 1043 | |
| Hounded to Death | 1044 | |
| A Bargain in Crime | 1045 | |
| The Fatal Prescription | 1046 | |
| The Man of Iron | 1047 | |
| An Amazing Scoundrel | 1048 | |
| The Chain of Evidence | 1049 | |
| Paid with Death | 1050 | |
| A Fight for a Throne | 1051 | |
| The Woman of Steel | 1052 | |
| The Seal of Death | 1053 | |
| The Human Fiend | 1054 | |
| A Desperate Chance | 1055 | |
| A Chase in the Dark | 1056 | |
| The Snare and the Game | 1057 | |
| The Murray Hill Mystery | 1058 | |
| Nick Carter's Close Call | 1059 | |
| The Missing Cotton King | 1060 | |
| A Game of Plots | 1061 | |
| The Prince of Liars | 1062 | |
| The Man at the Window | 1063 | |
| The Red League | 1064 | |
| The Price of a Secret | 1065 | |
| The Worst Case on Record | 1066 | |
| From Peril to Peril | 1067 | |
| The Seal of Silence | 1068 | |
| Nick Carter's Chinese Puzzle | 1069 | |
| A Blackmailer's Bluff | 1070 | |
| Heard in the Dark | 1071 | |
| A Checkmated Scoundrel | 1072 | |
| The Cashier's Secret | 1073 | |
| Behind a Mask | 1074 | |
| The Cloak of Guilt | 1075 | |
| Two Villains in One | 1076 | |
| The Hot Air Clew | 1077 | |
| Run to Earth | 1078 | |
| The Certified Check | 1079 | |
| Weaving the Web | 1080 | |
| Beyond Pursuit | 1081 | |
| The Claws of the Tiger | 1082 | |
| Driven From Cover | 1083 | |
| A Deal in Diamonds | 1084 | |
| The Wizard of the Cue | 1085 | |
| A Race for Ten Thousand | 1086 | |
| The Criminal Link | 1087 | |
| The Red Signal | 1088 | |
| The Secret Panel | 1089 | |
| A Bonded Villain | 1090 | |
| A Move in the Dark | 1091 | |
| Against Desperate Odds | 1092 | |
| The Telltale Photographs | 1093 | |
| The Ruby Pin | 1094 | |
| The Queen of Diamonds | 1095 | |
| A Broken Trail | 1096 | |
| An Ingenious Stratagem | 1097 | |
| A Sharper's Downfall | 1098 | 66718 |
| A Race Track Gamble | 1099 | |
| Without a Clew | 1100 | |
| The Council of Death | 1101 | |
| The Hole in the Vault | 1102 | |
| In Death's Grip | 1103 | |
| A Great Conspiracy | 1104 | |
| The Guilty Governor | 1105 | |
| A Ring of Rascals | 1106 | |
| A Masterpiece of Crime | 1107 | |
| A Blow For Vengeance | 1108 | |
| Tangled Threads | 1109 | |
| The Crime of the Camera | 1110 | |
| The Sign of the Dagger | 1111 | |
| Nick Carter's Promise | 1112 | |
| Marked for Death | 1113 | |
| The Limited Holdup | 1114 | |
| When the Trap Was Sprung | 1115 | |
| Through the Cellar Wall | 1116 | |
| Under the Tiger's Claws | 1117 | 65790 |
| The Girl in the Case | 1118 | |
| Behind a Throne | 1119 | |
| The Lure of Gold | 1120 | |
| Hand to Hand | 1121 | |
| From a Prison Cell | 1122 | |
| Dr. Quartz | 1123 | |
| Into Nick Carter's Web | 1124 | |
| The Mystic Diagram | 1125 | |
| The Hand That Won | 1126 | |
| Playing a Lone Hand | 1127 | |
| The Master Villain | 1128 | |
| The False Claimant | 1129 | |
| The Living Mask | 1130 | |
| The Crime and the Motive | 1131 | |
| A Mysterious Foe | 1132 | |
| A Missing Man | 1133 | |
| A Game Well Played | 1134 | |
| A Cigarette Clew | 1135 | 66700 |
| The Diamond Trail | 1136 | |
| The Silent Guardian | 1137 | |
| The Dead Stranger | 1138 | |
| The Doctor's Stratagem | 1140 | |
| Following a Chance Clew | 1141 | 66708 |
| The Bank Draft Puzzle | 1142 | |
| The Price of Treachery | 1143 | |
| The Silent Partner | 1144 | |
| Ahead of the Game | 1145 | |
| A Trap of Tangled Wire | 1146 | |
| In the Gloom of Night | 1147 | |
| The Unaccountable Crook | 1148 | |
| A Bundle of Clews | 1149 | |
| The Great Diamond Syndicate; Or, The Hardest Crew on Record | 1150 | 63340 |
| The Death Circle | 1151 | |
| The Toss of a Penny | 1152 | |
| One Step Too Far | 1153 | |
| The Terrible Thirteen | 1154 | |
| A Detective's Theory | 1155 | |
| Nick Carter's Auto Trail | 1156 | |
| A Triple Identity | 1157 | |
| A Mysterious Graft | 1158 | |
| A Carnival of Crime | 1159 | |
| The Bloodstone Terror | 1160 | |
| Trapped in His Own Net | 1161 | |
| The Last Move in the Game | 1162 | |
| A Victim of Deceit | 1163 | |
| With Links of Steel; Or, The Peril of the Unknown | 1164 | 14096 |
| A Plaything of Fate | 1165 | |
| The Key Ring Clew | 1166 | |
| Playing for a Fortune | 1167 | |
| At Mystery's Threshold | 1168 | |
| Trapped by a Woman | 1169 | |
| The Four Fingered Glove | 1170 | 66724 |
| Nabob and Knave | 1171 | |
| The Broadway Cross | 1172 | |
| The Man Without a Conscience; Or, From Rogue to Convict | 1173 | 63864 |
| A Master of Deviltry | 1174 | |
| Nick Carter's Double Catch | 1175 | |
| Doctor Quartz's Quick Move | 1176 | |
| The Vial of Death | 1177 | |
| Nick Carter's Star Pupils | 1178 | |
| Nick Carter's Girl Detective | 1179 | |
| A Baffled Oath | 1180 | |
| A Royal Thief | 1181 | |
| Down and Out | 1182 | |
| A Syndicate of Rascals | 1183 | |
| Played to a Finish | 1184 | |
| A Tangled Case | 1185 | |
| In Letters of Fire | 1186 | |
| Crossed Wires | 1187 | |
| A Plot Uncovered | 1188 | |
| The Cab Driver's Secret | 1189 | |
| Nick Carter's Death Warrant | 1190 | |
| The Plot that Failed | 1191 | 66863 |
| Nick Carter's Masterpiece | 1192 | |
| A Prince of Rogues | 1193 | |
| In the Lap of Danger | 1194 | |
| The Man from London | 1195 | |
| Circumstantial Evidence | 1196 | |
| The Pretty Stenographer Mystery | 1197 | |
| A Villainous Scheme | 1198 | |
| A Plot Within a Plot | 1199 | |
| The Elevated Railroad Mystery | 1200 | |
| The Blow of a Hammer | 1201 | |
| The Twin Mystery | 1202 | 65783 |
| The Bottle with the Black Label | 1203 | |
| Under False Colors | 1204 | |
| A Ring of Dust | 1205 | |
| The Crown Diamond | 1206 | |
| The Blood-red Badge | 1207 | |
| The Barrel Mystery | 1208 | |
| The Photographer's Evidence | 1209 | 62010 |
| Millions at Stake | 1210 | |
| The Man and His Price | 1211 | |
| A Double-Handed Game | 1212 | |
| A Strike for Freedom | 1213 | |
| A Disciple of Satan | 1214 | |
| The Marked Hand | 1215 | |
| A Fight With a Fiend | 1216 | |
| When the Wicked Prosper | 1217 | |
| A Plunge into Crime | 1218 | |
| An Artful Schemer | 1219 | |
| Reaping the Whirlwind | 1220 | |
| Out of Crime's Depths | 1221 | |
| A Woman at Bay; Or, A Fiend in Skirts | 1222 | 26704 |
| The Temple of Vice | 1223 | |
| Death at the Feast | 1224 | |
| A Double Plot | 1225 | |
| In Search of Himself | 1226 | |
| A Hunter of Men | 1227 | |
| The Boulevard Mutes | 1228 | |
| Captain Sparkle, Pirate; Or, A Hard Man to Catch | 1229 | 61514 |
| Nick Carter's Fall | 1230 | |
| Out of Death's Shadow; Or, A Case Without a Precedent | 1231 | 61135 |
| A Voice from the Past | 1232 | |
| Accident or Murder? | 1233 | |
| The Man Who Was Cursed | 1234 | |
| Baffled | 1235 | |
| A Case Without a Clew | 1236 | |
| The Demon's Eye | 1237 | |
| A Blindfold Mystery | 1238 | |
| | 1239 | |
| | 1240 | |
| | 1241 | |
| | 1242 | |
| | 1243 | |
| | 1244 | |
| | 1245 | |
| | 1246 | |
| | 1247 | |
| | 1248 | |
| | 1249 | |
| | 1250 | |
| | 1251 | |
| | 1252 | |
| | 1253 | |
| | 1254 | |
| | 1255 | |
| | 1256 | |
| | 1257 | |
| | 1258 | |
| | 1259 | |
| | 1260 | |
| | 1261 | |
| | 1262 | |
| | 1263 | |
| | 1264 | |
| | 1265 | |
| | 1266 | |
| | 1267 | |
| | 1268 | |
| | 1269 | |
| | 1270 | |
| | 1271 | |
| | 1272 | |
| | 1273 | |
| | 1274 | |
| | 1275 | |
| | 1276 | |
| | 1277 | |
| | 1278 | |
| | 1279 | |
| | 1280 | |
| | 1281 | |
| | 1282 | |
| | 1283 | |
| | 1284 | |
| | 1285 | |
| | 1286 | |
| A Stolen Name; Or, The Man Who Defied Nick Carter | 1287 | 64147 |
| A Play for Millions | 1288 | |
| | 1289 | |
| | 1290 | |

== Movies ==
The character has had a long and varied movie history, with three countries producing movies based on it.

=== France ===
==== Éclair ====
In 1908, the French movie company Éclair engaged Victorin-Hippolyte Jasset to make a serial movie based on the Nick Carter novels which were then being published in France by the German publisher Eichler. Nick Carter, le roi des détectives, with Pierre Bressol in the title role, was released in six episodes during late 1908, and enjoyed considerable success. Further adaptations followed with Nouvelles aventures de Nick Carter in 1909, and the character was revived for a confrontation with a master criminal in Zigomar contre Nick Carter in 1912.

==== 1960s ====
American actor Eddie Constantine played the title roles in the French-made spy movies Nick Carter va tout casser (1964) and Nick Carter et le trèfle rouge (1965). In one self-referential scene, Constantine (as Carter) enters a house where he finds a large collection of Nick Carter pulp magazines and other Nick Carter memorabilia. Neither movie is associated with the Killmaster book series.

=== Germany ===
The Hotel in Chicago (1920), The Passenger in the Straitjacket (1922), Women Who Commit Adultery (1922), and Only One Night (1922) are among the silent movies made in Germany featuring Nick Carter.

=== Czechoslovakia ===
The Czechoslovak movie Dinner for Adele (1977) is a parody inspired by Nick Carter's pulp magazine adventures. It features "America's most famous detective" visiting Prague at the beginning of the 20th century and solving a case involving a dangerous carnivorous plant (the Adele of the title). The Slovak actor Michal Dočolomanský played Nick Carter.

=== United States ===
==== MGM ====
Walter Pidgeon plays Nick Carter in a trilogy of movies released by Metro-Goldwyn-Mayer: Nick Carter, Master Detective (1939); Phantom Raiders (1940) and Sky Murder (1940). Though MGM owned the rights to a large number of Nick Carter stories, the movies used original screenplays.

In the 1944 MGM movie The Thin Man Goes Home, detective Nick Charles (William Powell) is seen reading a Nick Carter Detective magazine while relaxing in a hammock.

==== Columbia ====
Columbia could not afford the rights to produce a Nick Carter serial, so they made one about his son instead; Chick Carter, Detective appeared in 1946.

==== Television ====
In 1972, Robert Conrad made a television pilot movie, The Adventures of Nick Carter, which was set during the 19th century. It was shown as a rare made-for-TV installment of the ABC Sunday Night Movie, which normally featured theatrical releases edited for broadcast.

== Radio ==
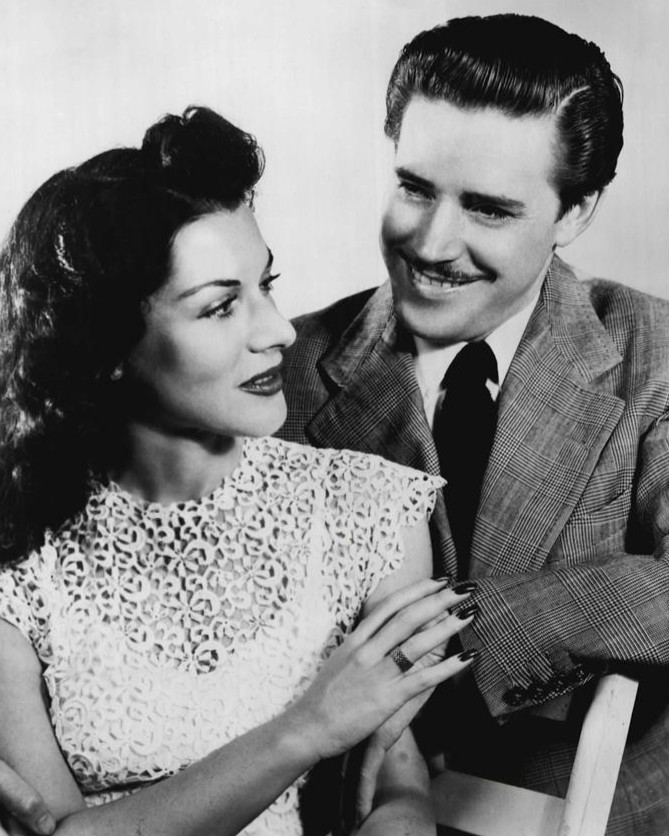
Charlotte Manson and Lon Clark in the Mutual series Nick Carter, Master Detective (1946)

Nick Carter first came to radio as The Return of Nick Carter. Then Nick Carter, Master Detective, with Lon Clark in the title role, began April 11, 1943, on Mutual, continuing in many different timeslots for more than a decade. Jock MacGregor was the producer-director of scripts by Alfred Bester, Milton J. Kramer, David Kogan and others. Background music was supplied by organists Hank Sylvern, Lew White and George Wright.

Patsy Bowen, Nick's assistant, was played by Helen Choate until mid-1946 and then Charlotte Manson was given the role. Nick and Patsy's friend was reporter Scubby Wilson (John Kane). Nick's contact at the police department was Sgt. Mathison (Ed Latimer). The supporting cast included Raymond Edward Johnson, Bill Johnstone and Bryna Raeburn. Michael Fitzmaurice was the program's announcer. The series ended on September 25, 1955.

Chick Carter, Boy Detective was a serial adventure that were broadcast weekday afternoons on Mutual. Chick Carter, the adopted son of Nick Carter, was played by Bill Lipton (1943–44) and Leon Janney (1944–45). The series was broadcast from July 5, 1943 to July 6, 1945.

== Comic books ==
In 1937, the Brazilian comic artist Renato Silva published a comic strip featuring Nick Carter published in the comic book Suplemento Juvenil.

Nick Carter and Chick Carter appeared in comics published by Street & Smith from 1940 to 1949.

Nick appeared in The Shadow Comics, was then transferred to Army & Navy Comics and Doc Savage Comics briefly, before being transferred back to The Shadow Comics. Some of these appearances were in text stories.

Chick appeared in The Shadow Comics, some of which were in text stories.

There was also Nick Carter, a 1972 Italian comic strip featuring detective Nick Carter.

== See also ==
- List of Street & Smith publications

== Sources ==
- Tuska, Jon. The Detective in Hollywood, 1978. ISBN 0-385-12093-1.
