= Bruno Eichgrün =

German actor

- Born: 10 January 1877; Berlin, German Empire
- Died: 2 June 1937 (aged 60); Berlin, Germany
- Occupations: Actor, Director
- Years active: 1916-1935 (film)

Bruno Eichgrün (10 January 1877 – 2 June 1937) was a German actor and film director. He played the private detective Nick Carter in several silent films.

== Selected filmography ==
=== Director ===
- The Hotel in Chicago (1921)
- Women Who Commit Adultery (1922)

=== Actor ===
- The Lost Paradise (1917)
- The Adventures of Captain Hansen (1917)
- The White Terror (1917)
- The House of Three Girls (1918)
- The Blue Lantern (1918)
- Hedda's Revenge (1919)
- Lilli (1919)
- Lilli's Marriage (1919)
- The Inheritance from New York (1919), as Nick Carter
- The Hotel in Chicago (1921), as Nic Carter
- Only One Night (1922), as Nick Carter
- The Passenger in the Straitjacket (1922), as Nick Carter
- Women Who Commit Adultery (1922), as Nick Carter
- Foolish Happiness (1929)
- His Late Excellency (1935)

== Bibliography ==
- Soister, John T. Conrad Veidt on Screen: A Comprehensive Illustrated Filmography. McFarland, 2002.
