= Only One Night =

Only One Night may refer to:

- Only One Night (1950 film), a West German drama film
- Only One Night (1939 film), a Swedish romantic drama film
- Only One Night (1922 film), a German silent film
