= Paul Hardtmuth =

British actor (1888–1962)

- Hardtmuth in The Third Man (1949)
- Born: 2 July 1888; Berlin, Germany
- Died: 5 January 1962 (aged 73); Hampstead, London, England
- Occupations: Actor and writer
- Years active: 1917–1961

Paul Hardtmuth (2 July 1888 – 5 January 1962) was a British actor.

He made his film debut in Germany in 1917, and appeared in and co-wrote the film Um der Liebe Willen in 1920.

He was born in 1888 in Berlin, and died on 5 January 1962 in Hampstead, London.

== Partial filmography ==
- Um der Liebe Willen (1920)
- Die büßende Magdalena (1922) - Geselle vom Schmied
- Only One Night (1922) - Boka, ein alter Zigeuner
- Frauen, die die Ehe brechen (1922) - Petrasch
- The Big Thief (1922) - Bolten
- Bedelia (1946) - Old Frenchman
- I Was a Male War Bride (1949) - German Mayor (uncredited)
- The Lost People (1949) - Jiri
- The Third Man (1949) - Hartman - Hall Porter at Hotel Sacher (uncredited)
- Highly Dangerous (1950) - Priest
- The Wonder Kid (1951) - Professor Bindl
- Desperate Moment (1953) - Wharf Watchman
- Street of Shadows (1953) - J.M. Mayall
- The Diamond (1954) - Dr. Eric Miller
- Timeslip (1955) - Dr. Bressler
- All for Mary (1955) - Porter
- The Gamma People (1956) - Hans
- Assignment Redhead (1955) - Dr. Buchmann
- Odongo (1956) - Mohammed
- The Curse of Frankenstein (1957) - Professor Bernstein
- The House of the Seven Hawks (1959) - Beukleman
- Doctor Blood's Coffin (1961) - Prof. Luckman
