= Women Who Commit Adultery =

1922 film

- Directed by: Bruno Eichgrün
- Written by: M.O. Green
- Starring: Bruno Eichgrün
- Cinematography: Josef Dietze; Kurt Lande
- Release date: 1922
- Country: Germany
- Languages: Silent; German intertitles

Women Who Commit Adultery (German:Frauen, die die Ehe brechen) is a 1922 German silent film directed by and starring Bruno Eichgrün as the private detective Nick Carter. It was made as the sequel to The Passenger in the Straitjacket.

== Cast ==
In alphabetical order

- Margit Barnay as Sonja
- Bruno Eichgrün as Nick Carter
- Paul Hardtmuth as Petrasch
- Margarete Kupfer as Ruschka
- Frieda Lehndorf as Fords Frau
- Mabel May-Yong as Pula Sibierska
- Max Neumann as Konzertmeister Ford
- Felix Norfolk as Camillo
- Ethel Orff as Tanja
- Max Ruhbeck as Nagy
- Fritz Ruß as Davis Moscheles
- Robert Scholz as Fürst Roburow
- Emil Sondermann as Gepäckmeister
- Helene Voß as Frau Kovalovska
- Hans Wolmerod as Alex

== Bibliography ==
- Weniger, Kay (2011). 'Es wird im Leben dir mehr genommen als gegeben ...' Lexikon der aus Deutschland und ™sterreich emigrierten Filmschaffenden 1933 bis 1945: Eine Gesamt bersicht (in German). ACABUS Verlag. ISBN 9783862820498.
