= Nick Carter, Master Detective =

Radio series

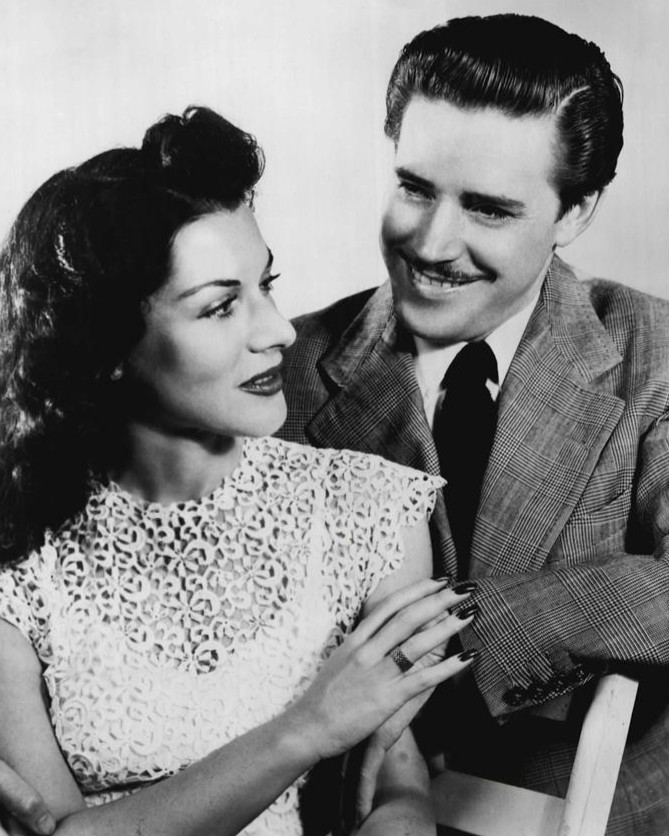
Charlotte Manson as Patsy Bowen and Lon Clark as Nick Carter, 1946.

Nick Carter, Master Detective is a Mutual radio crime drama based on tales of the fictional private detective Nick Carter from Street & Smith's dime novels and pulp magazines. Nick Carter first came to radio as The Return of Nick Carter, a reference to the character's pulp origins, but the title was soon changed to Nick Carter, Master Detective. A veteran radio dramatist, Ferrin Fraser, wrote many of the scripts.

== Program history ==
With Lon Clark in the title role, the series commenced 11 April 1943, on Mutual, continuing in many different timeslots for well over a decade. Between October 1944 and April 1945, it was heard as a 30-minute program on Sunday afternoons at 3 pm, sponsored by Acme Paints and Lin-X, with a 15-minute serial airing four or five times a week in 1944 from April to September. In April 1945, the Sunday series moved to 6pm, continuing in that timeslot until June 1946, and it was also heard in 1946 on Tuesday from March to August.

Sponsored by Cudahy Packing and Old Dutch Cleanser and later Acme Products (makers of such home-improvement chemicals as Kem-Tone paints and Lin-X floor-cleaning waxes, a near-rival to the more-popular Johnson's Wax products heard on numerous NBC Radio shows at the same time), the series finally settled in on Sundays at 6:30 pm for broadcasts from August 18, 1946 to September 21, 1952. Libby Packing was the sponsor when the drama aired on Sundays at 6pm (1952–53). In the last two years of the long run (1953–55), the show was heard Sundays at 4:30 pm.

Jock MacGregor was the producer-director of scripts by Alfred Bester, Milton J. Kramer, David Kogan and others. Background music was supplied by organists Hank Sylvern, Lew White and George Wright. Walter B. Gibson, co-creator/writer of The Shadow pulp novels, was fired when he asked for a raise in 1946, and then became head writer for the Nick Carter radio series. Oddly enough, he never liked to write scripts for the radio version of The Shadow, though both characters were published by Street & Smith.

Patsy Bowen, Nick's assistant, was portrayed by Helen Choate until mid-1945; then Charlotte Manson stepped into the role. Nick and Patsy's friend was reporter Scubby Wilson (John Kane). Sgt. Mathison (Ed Latimer) was Nick's contact at the police department. The supporting cast included Raymond Edward Johnson, Bill Johnstone and Bryna Raeburn. Michael Fitzmaurice was the program's announcer. The series ended on September 25, 1955.

=== Chick Carter, Boy Detective ===
Chick Carter, Boy Detective was a serial adventure that aired weekday afternoons on Mutual. Chick Carter, the adopted son of Nick Carter, was played by Bill Lipton (1943–44) and Leon Janney (1944–45). The series aired from July 5, 1943 to July 6, 1945.

== Episodes ==
Episodes included "The Case of the Brick Oven Corpse" on July 3, 1949, and "The Case of the Impossible Murder" on April 5, 1953.

== Listen to ==
- Nick Carter, Master Detective (124 episodes)
