= Secret Agent of Japan =

1942 film by Irving Pichel

- Directed by: Irving Pichel
- Written by: John Larkin
- Starring: Preston Foster; Lynn Bari
- Cinematography: Lucien N. Andriot
- Edited by: Alfred Day
- Production company: 20th Century Fox
- Distributed by: 20th Century Fox
- Release dates: March 21, 1942 (New York City); April 3, 1942 (USA)
- Running time: 72 minutes
- Country: United States
- Language: English

Secret Agent of Japan is a 1942 spy film directed by Irving Pichel and starring Preston Foster. It was the first American anti-Japanese war film produced by a major studio after the attack on Pearl Harbor.

== Plot ==
A nightclub owner in Shanghai becomes involved in espionage revolving around preparations for the attack.

== Cast ==
- Preston Foster as James Carmichael, alias Roy Bonnell
- Lynn Bari as Kay Murdock
- Noel Madison as Isoda Saito
- Victor Sen Yung as Fu Yen
- Janis Carter as Doris Poole
- Steven Geray as Mulhauser, alias Constantin Alexandri
- Kurt Katch as Traeger
- Addison Richards as Detective Remsen
- Ian Wolfe as Capt. Karl Larsen
- Hermine Sterler as Frau Mulhauser
- Selmer Jackson as American Naval Captain
- Frank Puglia as Victor Eminescu
- Leyland Hodgson as English Secret Service
- Leslie Denison as English Secret Service
- Jean Del Val as Pierre Solaire

== Critical reception ==
The film drew mixed reviews from critics. Theodore Strauss of New York Times panned the film, calling it "a very mild hate-brew" and "third-rate drama", and stating, "Nowadays, we doubt whether anybody, even Hirohito, will be much excited". Variety wrote that "the picture doesn't achieve more than moderately entertaining proportions for the adult ... Foster and Miss Bari show off excellently, though some of the supporting parts are pretty awful." Film Daily called it "a rousing melodrama" but found the twists and turns of the plot confusing. Harrison's Reports wrote: "An engrossing espionage melodrama that is timely. The story value is good, and competent direction and excellent performances help maintain the interest throughout."

The film seems to "have legs", though, as it scores a 6.9/10 stars on IMDb (see link below).
