= Kurt Katch =

Polish actor (1893–1958)

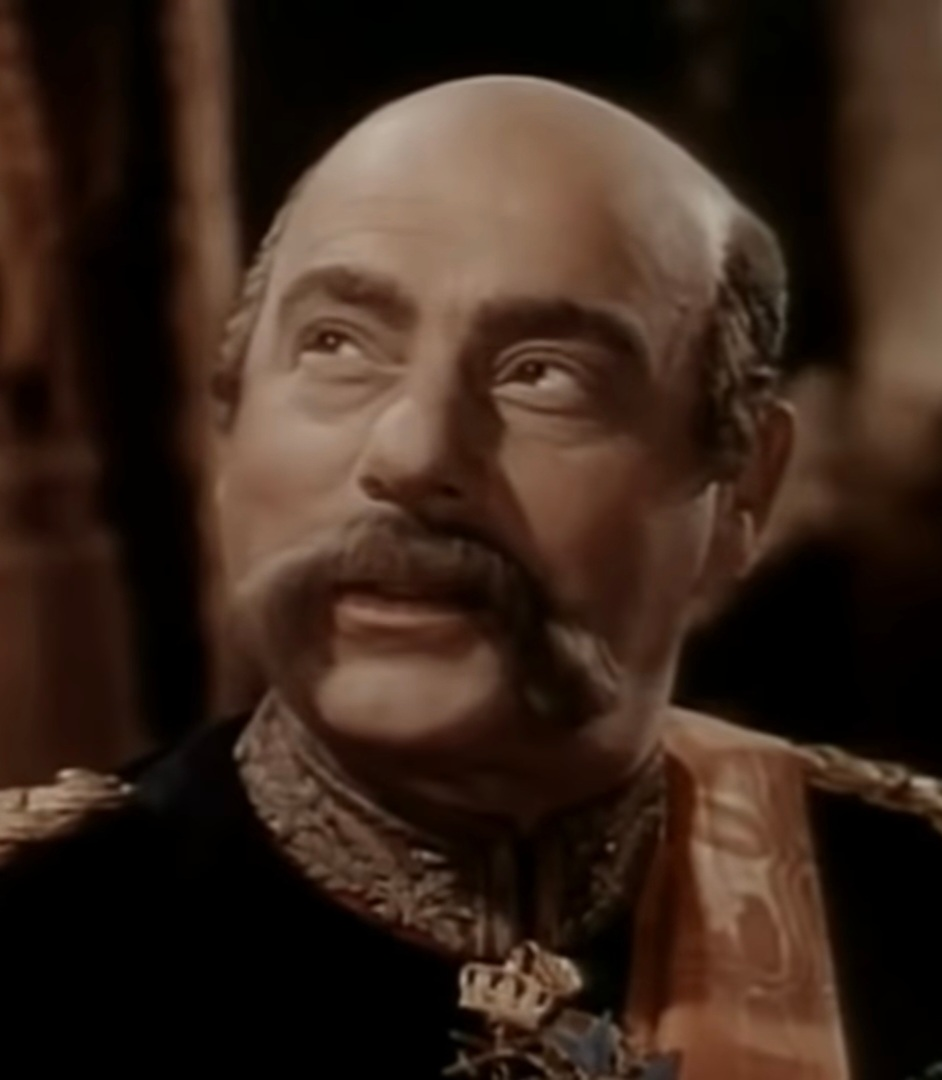
- Katch in Salome, Where She Danced (1945)
- Born: Isser Kac; 28 January 1893; Grodno, Poland, Russian Empire (now Hrodna, Belarus)
- Died: 14 August 1958 (aged 65); Los Angeles, California, U.S.
- Resting place: Eden Memorial Park Cemetery
- Occupation: Actor
- Years active: 1919–1958
- Spouse: Hinda Ryfka Kleinlerer (m. 1938)
- Children: Vic Katch

Kurt Katch (born Isser Kac; January 28, 1893 – August 14, 1958) was a Polish film and television actor. He appeared in Quiet Please, Murder, The Purple V, The Mask of Dimitrios, Ali Baba and the Forty Thieves, among many others. Katch appeared in the first James Bond story filmed (Casino Royale) in 1954 for the Climax! TV show. Katch died from cancer and is interred at Eden Memorial Park Cemetery in Los Angeles.

== Selected filmography ==
- Die Sekretärin des Gesandten (1919)
- Die geheimnisvolle Kugel (1919) - Wucherer Rascon Balthasar
- The Mexican (1919)
- Das Lied der Nornen (1919) - Sado
- Der Todesbote (1920)
- Ihr tollster Trick (1920) - Tom Gibson, Maler
- Das offene Grab (1921)
- Die Apotheke des Teufels (1921) - Charley
- Ein ungeklärter Fall (1921)
- The Hotel in Chicago (1921) - Manuele
- Wildnis (1922)
- Zwischen Tag und Traum (1922) - Mac Duffre
- Quarantine (1923) - Hafenarzt
- Der Sohn des Galeerensträftlings (1923) - Der Dicke
- Dudu, a Human Destiny (1924)
- Die Räuberbande (1928)
- Land Without Women (1929) - Goldminer
- The League of Three (1929) - Morris
- Al khet (1936) - Prof. Levin
- The Vow (1937) - Mendl Feld
- Ludzie Wisly (1938)
- Man at Large (1941) - Hans Brinker, First Victim
- Don Winslow of the Navy (1942) - The Scorpion
- Secret Agent of Japan (1942) - Traeger
- The Wife Takes a Flyer (1942) - Capt. Schmutnick (uncredited)
- Berlin Correspondent (1942) - Weiner
- Counter-Espionage (1942) - Gustav Soessel
- Desperate Journey (1942) - Hesse (uncredited)
- Quiet Please, Murder (1942) - Eric Pahsen
- The Purple V (1943) - Johann Keller
- Edge of Darkness (1943) - German Captain (uncredited)
- Mission to Moscow (1943) - Gen. Semen Timoshenko (uncredited)
- They Came to Blow Up America (1943) - Schonzeit
- Background to Danger (1943) - Mailler
- Secret Service in Darkest Africa (1943, Serial) - Kurt Hauptmann [Ch. 1]
- Watch on the Rhine (1943) - Herr Blecher
- The Strange Death of Adolf Hitler (1943) - Corp. Karl Frobe
- Ali Baba and the Forty Thieves (1944) - Hulagu Khan
- The Purple Heart (1944) - Ludwig Kruger (uncredited)
- Make Your Own Bed (1944) - Herr von Ritter
- The Mask of Dimitrios (1944) - Colonel Haki
- The Seventh Cross (1944) - Leo Hermann
- The Conspirators (1944) - Otto Lutzke
- The Mummy's Curse (1944) - Cajun Joe
- Salome, Where She Danced (1945) - Count Von Bismarck
- Rendezvous 24 (1946) - Dr. Heligmann
- Angel on My Shoulder (1946) - Warden in Hell (uncredited)
- Strange Journey (1946) - Horst
- Song of Love (1947) - Judge
- Secret of the Incas (1954) - Man with Rifle
- The Adventures of Hajji Baba (1954) - Caoush (uncredited)
- Abbott and Costello Meet the Mummy (1955) - Dr. Zoomer
- Never Say Goodbye (1956) - Landlord (uncredited)
- Hot Cars (1956) - Otto Krantz (uncredited)
- Pharaoh's Curse (1957) - Hans Brecht
- The Girl in the Kremlin (1957) - Commissar
- The Gift of Love (1958) - Lecturing Professor (uncredited)
- The Beast of Budapest (1958) - Sgt. Geza
- The Young Lions (1958) - Camp Commandant (uncredited)
- When Hell Broke Loose (1958) - German 'Werewolf' (uncredited) (final film role)
