= Lilli (1919 film) =

1919 film

- Directed by: Jaap Speyer
- Written by: Jolanthe Marés (novel)
- Cinematography: Max Lutze
- Production companies: Althoff & Company
- Release date: 18 November 1919
- Country: Germany
- Languages: Silent; German intertitles

Lilli is a 1919 German silent film directed by Jaap Speyer.

The film's sets were designed by the art director Hans Dreier.

== Cast ==
In alphabetical order

- Arnold Czempin as Pablo Cabrera
- Bruno Eichgrün as Doktor Werner Friese
- Fritz Hartwig as Ulrich Traube
- Charles Willy Kayser as Hans von Schöneich
- Richard Kirsch as Dr. Reiche
- Leopoldine Konstantin as Suse Wolf
- Kurt Middendorf as Erwin Bach
- Mia Pankau as Lilli Stein
- Emil Rameau as Baumeister Stein
- Reinhold Schünzel as Dr. Goldmann
- Ernst Stahl-Nachbaur as Graf von Simon
- Toni Tetzlaff as Frau Stein

== Bibliography ==
- Parish, James Robert; Canham, Kingsley (1976). Film Directors Guide: Western Europe. Metuchen, NJ: Scarecrow Press. ISBN 978-0-8108-0908-6.
