= Charlotte Manson =

American actress

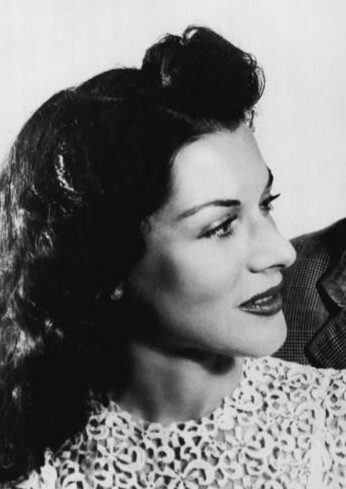
- Manson as Patsy Bowen on Nick Carter, Master Detective, 1946.
- Born: Charlotte Manson Schwartz; January 21, 1917; Brooklyn, New York, USA
- Died: December 15, 1996 (aged 79)
- Education: Hunter College; New York University

Charlotte Manson (born Charlotte Manson Schwartz; January 21, 1917 – December 15, 1996) was an American radio actress whose career was interrupted by paralysis.

== Early life ==
Born and raised in Brooklyn, Manson was the only child of Etta T. Manson and Morris Schwartz. From ages 5 through 8, she performed in children's plays at the Brooklyn Academy of Music. Also as a child, she participated in Junior Olympics.

Manson was the first female member of Madison High School's debate team. She attended Hunter College, where her performance as Ophelia in the dramatic club's production of Hamlet led to her receiving a scholarship to New York University (NYU) if she would act with the Washington Square Players, which she did. She graduated from NYU with a degree in English in 1938. In 1939, she acted in summer stock on Long Island.

== Career ==
Early in her career, Manson appeared in a few films as an extra and in bit parts. After she became regularly employed in radio, she received a contract to star in a film, but the producer found another actress whom he preferred for the role. Manson's contract was paid off the day she arrived in Hollywood, ending that opportunity.

Manson's early work in radio included a variety of roles in different programs. Her career gained stability, however, when a radio director saw her perform on Broadway in a Theater Guild production of Ringside Seat. The result was a long-term contract to star as Bryn Barrington in Society Girl on CBS radio. Following that role, she moved to Chicago, where she starred in the drama Stepmother for 18 months. She later had the leading female role in King's Row. Her other roles on radio included Marjorie Whitney on The Romance of Helen Trent, Rose Kransky on Guiding Light, Patsy Bowen on Nick Carter, Master Detective and Dr. Carson McVicker on Road of Life. She also was a supporting actress on The Brighter Day.

Manson was active in commercials on radio. Her roles in that regard included being the Camay Girl on Big Sister, the Puritan Girl on True or False, the Ronson Girl on Twenty Questions, and the Speidell Girl on Stop the Music. Perhaps her biggest commercial role was as Carol Douglas, beauty consultant. The manufacturer of the products she endorsed paid six secretaries to write letters answering beauty questions that listeners addressed to the fictitious Douglas.

On September 14, 1958, Manson fell down steps in an accident that caused a double fracture of her neck and paralyzed her. However, citing her faith in God and in herself, she resisted her doctors' prognosis that she might never walk again. After 10 weeks, she began wearing a steel brace and had some movement. She was able to resume playing Gillian Gray on This Is Nora Drake on radio. Her brace was removed on February 15, 1959, and her doctors at the Hospital for Joint Diseases in Manhattan described her recovery as a "medical miracle".

== Personal life ==
In 1949, Manson married singer Dick Brown in New York. In her spare time she visited New York radio stations promoting his records.
