= Lon Clark =

American actor (1912–1998)

Lon Clark

Lon Clark (January 12, 1912 – October 2, 1998) was a New York City actor of stage and radio.

== Early years ==
Clark was born in Frost, Minnesota, a town that his grandfather helped to create after he immigrated from Norway. His interest in acting began in his childhood as he had free admission to the theater where his mother played piano for silent films. As a youth in Minnesota, Clark studied at the MacPhail Center for Music in Minneapolis.

== Early career ==
Clark began as a musician and actor in traveling tent shows, performing for "farmers, coal miners, and the Indians in the Dakotas", followed by a season with the Cincinnati Summer Opera. He worked at a radio station in Chicago until a talent scout heard him and brought him to Cincinnati. He was at WLW in Cincinnati from 1936 to 1940. Additionally, he was a baritone soloist at First Presbyterian Church in Walnut Hills. After participating in radio drama in Cincinnati, he arrived in New York during the 1940s, and his rich baritone voice quickly led to network radio roles.

== Radio ==
He had the title role in Nick Carter, Master Detective on the Mutual Broadcasting System from 1943 to 1955. The Nick Carter scripts were by Alfred Bester and others. Clark also played the district attorney in Front Page Farrell.

Clark was also a familiar voice on such programs as the weekday serial Mommie and the Men, the frontier serial adventure Wilderness Road, the World War II dramas Words at War (1943–45) and Soldiers of the Press (1942–45), the quiz show Quick as a Flash, the soap opera Bright Horizon, the science fiction series 2000 Plus and Exploring Tomorrow, Lights Out, The Mysterious Traveler, The Kate Smith Hour, The March of Time, The Adventures of the Thin Man and Norman Corwin Presents, playing opposite such performers as Fred Allen, Art Carney, Helen Hayes and Orson Welles. Oldtime radio collectors also identify Clark as the unnamed reader of Sunday funnies on the Hearst-syndicated "Comic Weekly Man" series.

== Broadway ==
Clark returned to the stage in his later years, replacing Jason Robards in the 1956 Broadway production of Eugene O'Neill's Long Day's Journey into Night. He was back on Broadway in the short run of Sidney Sheldon's Roman Candle with Inger Stevens and Julia Meade.

== Personal life and death ==
Clark married Marjorie Burns in 1938, and they had two sons. He was 86 when he died at St. Clare's Hospital in Manhattan, survived by his wife, Michelle Trudeau Clark; two sons, Lon Jr. and Stephen, both of San Francisco; a brother, Gerald, of Plymouth, Minnesota; and a grandson.
