= The Inheritance from New York =

- Directed by: Wolfgang Neff
- Written by: Jane Bess
- Produced by: Liddy Hegewald
- Starring: Bruno Eichgrün
- Production company: Hegewald Film
- Distributed by: Hegewald Film
- Release date: 1919
- Country: Germany
- Languages: Silent; German intertitles

The Inheritance from New York (German:Die Erbschaft von New York) is a 1919 German silent film directed by Wolfgang Neff and starring Bruno Eichgrün.

== Cast ==
In alphabetical order

- Siegmund Aschenbach as Van den Laar - Kaffeekönig
- Bruno Eichgrün as Nick Carter
- Erwin Fichtner as Henrik
- Hanna Holl as Lou Renard - Artistin
- Gerhard Ritterband as Bobby
