= The Passenger in the Straitjacket =

1922 film by Rudolf Walther-Fein

- Directed by: Rudolf Walther-Fein
- Written by: Rolf E. Vanloo
- Cinematography: Kurt Lande
- Production company: Aafa-Film
- Release date: 1922
- Country: Germany
- Languages: Silent; German intertitles

The Passenger in the Straitjacket (German: Der Passagier in der Zwangsjacke) is a 1922 German silent film directed by Rudolf Walther-Fein. It was one of two German films released that year featuring the private detective character Nick Carter.

== Cast ==
- Bruno Eichgrün as Nick Carter
- Karl Falkenberg as Bruns
- Rose Lichtenstein as Frau Bruns
- Willi Allan as Lidhi
- Arthur Bergen as Baron Mottek
- Alfred Graening as Graf Haugk
- Fritz Kampers as Mr. Hudson
- Grete Sorbeck as Zofe bei Bruns

== Bibliography ==
- Weniger, Kay. 'Es wird im Leben dir mehr genommen als gegeben ...' Lexikon der aus Deutschland und Österreich emigrierten Filmschaffenden 1933 bis 1945. ACABUS Verlag, 2011.
