= The Hotel in Chicago =

1920 film

- Directed by: Bruno Eichgrün
- Production companies: Althoff & Company
- Release date: 1920
- Country: Germany
- Languages: Silent; German intertitles

The Hotel in Chicago (German:Das Gasthaus von Chicago) is a 1921 German silent film directed by Bruno Eichgrün.

== Cast ==
In alphabetical order

- Pietro Bruce as Jimmy, der Wirt
- Bruno Eichgrün as Nic Carter
- Erwin Fichtner
- Richard Georg as Mr. John Cutter
- Kurt Katch as Manuele
- Gerhard Ritterband as Bobby
- Grete Weixler as Schöne Anita

== Bibliography ==
- Rea Brändle. Nayo Bruce: Geschichte einer afrikanischen Familie in Europa. Sautter, 2007.
