= List of Touch anime episodes =

Touch is a 101 episode anime television series that aired on Fuji TV in Japan from March 24, 1985, until March 22, 1987. It was one of the highest-rated anime television shows ever in Japan, with episodes consistently rated 30+ percentage points during parts of its run. In a 2005 poll by TV Asahi of the top 100 animated television series, Touch was ranked ninth.

The series tells the story of twins, Tatsuya and Katsuya Uesugi, who live next door to Minami Asakura. Their parents built a playhouse between their properties so the children could play together there. As they grew older, they noticed that one of them (Minami) was a girl. The story picks up when they are in junior high school just before they graduate and move to high school.

== Episode list ==
No.	Title	Original release date
1	"No matter what everybody says, we're twins!!" Transliteration: "Dare ga nanto iō to oretachi futago desu!!" (Japanese: 誰がなんと言おーとオレたち双子です!!)	March 24, 1985
2	"Women's intuition! Worried about Tatsuya's talent" Transliteration: "Onna no chokkan! Chotchi kininaru Tatsuya no sainō" (Japanese: 女の直感!チョッチ気になる達也の才能)	March 31, 1985
3	"Unexpectedly pitching for the first time! Kazuya's troublesome name!?" Transliteration: "Omowazu hatsutouban! Kazuya no namae de osawagase!?" (Japanese: 思わず初登板!和也の名前でお騒がせ!?)	April 7, 1985
4	"Did you see? Didn't you see?! Minami's diary!" Transliteration: "Mita ka? Minai ka? Minami no nikki!!" (Japanese: 見たか?見ないか!?南の日記!!)	April 14, 1985
5	"High fever rally race! Such an accurate goal!?" Transliteration: "Nekketsu baton tatchi! Gōru wa seikaku ni ne!?" (Japanese: 熱血バトンタッチ!ゴールは正確にネ!?)	April 21, 1985
6	"The rumour's true!? Minami & Kazuya's worried families" Transliteration: "Uwasa wa hontō!? Minami to Kazuya no kininaru kankei" (Japanese: ウワサは本当!?南と和也の気になる関係)	April 28, 1985
7	"Really! Tatsuya and Minami's wedding clothes!?" Transliteration: "E honto!! Tatsuya to Minami ga kekkon shichau!?" (Japanese: えッホント!!達也と南が結婚しちゃう!?)	May 5, 1985
8	"Tatsuya in a fight! The truth at the brother showdown" Transliteration: "Tatsuya uchimasu!! Honki de kyōdai taiketsu" (Japanese: 達也打ちます!!ホンキで兄弟対決!?)	May 12, 1985
9	"Tatsuya and Harada's dangerous friendship!" Transliteration: "Tatsuya to Harada-kun no abunai yūjō!" (Japanese: 達也と原田クンのア·ブ·ナ·イ友情!)	May 19, 1985
10	"Everyone in the high school is worried!" Transliteration: "Minna nayande kibun wa sukkari kōkōsei desu!" (Japanese: みんな悩んで気分はすっかり高校生デス!)	May 26, 1985
A girl gives Harada a hat and a scarf. Kazuya does tryouts for a high school baseball club.
11	"Come on, baseball team! A subtle shift in Tatsuya's heart!" Transliteration: "Kitare yakyūbu! Bimyō ni yureru Tatsuya no kokoro!!" (Japanese: 来たれ野球部!微妙に揺れる達也の心!!)	June 2, 1985
High school begins. Tatsuya, Kazuya, Minami, Koutaro and Harada are all in the same class. Tatsuya almost joins the baseball club but after finding out Minami is the new manager, he joins the boxing club with Harada instead.
12	"First practice! Vigorous Kazuya & worn-out Tatsuya!?"; Transliteration: "Hatsu renshū! Hatsuratsu Kazuya to yoreyore Tatsuya!?" (Japanese: 初練習!ハツラツ和也とヨレヨレ達也!?)	June 9, 1985
Kazuya wins a baseball game with the club. Harada engages in an unsolicited talk with Tatsuya about his relationship with Minami.
13	"Kazuya's worried! Dear Kōtarō's slump" Transliteration: "Kazuya shinpai desu! Koi no suranpu Kōtarō-kun" (Japanese: 和也心配です!恋のスランプ孝太郎くん)	June 16, 1985
Kotaro writes in the school paper that Minami is his ideal woman, due to his close friendship with her and Kazuya. This causes problems when he develops a crush on a girl named Natsuko Yamakura. At the end of the episode his and Natsuko's mutual feelings are revealed.
14	"Discontent? Minami & Kazuya are the best couple!?" Transliteration: "Fuman desu? Minami to Kazuya wa besuto kappuru!?" (Japanese: 不満です?南と和也はベストカップル!?)	June 23, 1985
Kazuya and Minami are voted best couple at school. Tatsuya, refusing to punch in the boxing ring is beat up by and receives advice from Harada. Due to the unrelenting rain, Minami waits for him after practice and they share an umbrella on their way home.
15	"This is trouble! Tatsuya slapped Minami!"; Transliteration: "Kore wa jiken desu! Tatsuya ga Minami o hirateuchi!!" (Japanese: これは事件です!達也が南を平手打ち!!)	June 30, 1985
Minami tries to give Tatsuya her prize from the best couple contest. She teases him for being jealous when he refuses it, and he slaps her. In the end he apologizes, but not before accidentally revealing why he was upset.
16	"It's painful! Kazuya's heart is lemon-colored!" Transliteration: "Setsunai ne! Kazuya no hāto wa remon iro!" (Japanese: せつないネ!和也のハートはレモン色!)	July 7, 1985
Tensions bubble up between the main trio as Kazuya confesses to Minami and tells Tatsuya about it. The next day Minami goes home from school sick, and both siblings buy her lemons to make her feel better, though Tatsuya arrives first since Kazuya is at practice. Minami then confesses to Tatsuya, but he brushes the incident off as a result of her fever.
17	"First kiss! Too much love from Minami!?"; Transliteration: "fāsuto kisu! Minami yori ai o komete!?" (Japanese: ファースト·キス!南より愛をこめて!?)	July 14, 1985
Kazuya's first match of the prelims for Koshien is the same day as Tatsuya's first boxing match, and Minami has to pick one event to go to. She makes Tatsuya promise to win despite his protests. She attends the baseball game and their team wins, while Tatsuya puts up a good fight but ultimately loses and is embarrassed. That night she gives him a kiss.
18	"Tatsuya's feelings are a little complex!" Transliteration: "Tatsuya no kimochi wa chotto fukuzatsu desu!" (Japanese: 達也の気持ちはちょっとフクザツです!)	July 21, 1985
Tatsuya can't eat all day and is off his rhythm after the kiss the night before. With Harada's help he talks to Minami about it. She is secure about her feelings, but asserts that for now, she wants to focus on getting to the Koshien.
19	"Forget, forget-me-not!? Important memories for two" Transliteration: "Wasuretai wasurenai!? Futari no daiji na omoide" (Japanese: 忘れたい忘れない!?二人の大事な思い出)	August 4, 1985
At the cafe Mr. Asakura talks with Tatsuya. Later that night Tatsuya goes on a walk with Minami and asks her to forget the kiss. She replies that she knows he did this out of kindness for Kazuya, but she refuses to forget. Kotaro overhears them, and encourages Kazuya to strive for Koshien for his own sake. They win their game.
20	"What should he do? Tatsuya's tender chance encounter!" Transliteration: "Dōsuru no? Tatsuya no yasashisa surechigai!!" (Japanese: どーするの?達也の優しさすれちがい!!)	August 11, 1985
Tatsuya buys Kazuya a new mitt, but hides it once he finds out the whole team was gifted new mitts. Tatsuya, Minami and Kazuya play cards, and Tatsuya tries to hide his win to allow Kazuya to, only to be exposed. Kazuya challenges him to Minami over cards but she disrupts the idea. Both of them make it clear to Tatsuya that they are waiting for him to comete in a serious capacity one day. The next day, Kazuya runs off to practice happily clutching the mitt Tatsuya bought for him after finding it.
21	"Kat-chan wanted to make it to Kōshien for Minami's sake" Transliteration: "Soredemo Katchan wa Minami no tame ni Kōshien" (Japanese: それでもカッちゃんは南のために甲子園)	August 18, 1985
Up next Meisei is competing with Terashima, and Kazuya has to face some hard truths about competition on the path to the Koushien.
22	"Keep on playing ball! Kazuya vs. Terashima!"; Transliteration: "Iyoiyo purei bōru! Kazuya tai Terashima!" (Japanese: いよいよプレーボール!和也VS寺島!)	August 25, 1985
The game against Terashima's team begins. Tatsuya watches from the coffee shop.
23	"Minami registered! She appeared!? Love's timely sudden change" Transliteration: "Minami ni todoke! Deruka!? Koi no gyakuten taimurī" (Japanese: 南に届け!出るか!? 恋の逆転タイムリー)	September 8, 1985
After a long and tense game, Meisei pulls ahead in the final inning. This means they only have one more game before they qualify for the Koushien. Harada encourages Tatsuya to begin aiming for both baseball and Minami.
24	"Kōshien after just one more, Minami's dream after just one more!" Transliteration: "Kōshien made ato hitotsu, Minami no yume mo ato hitotsu!" (Japanese: 甲子園まであと1つ 南の夢もあと1つ!)	September 22, 1985
Minami tells Tatsuya that after Kazuya makes it to the Koshien it's on him to make her other dream come true. Kazuya tells Minami he plans of asking her father if they can become engaged if he makes it to the Koshien. It upsets her, so he changes his mind and lets it drop. Separately, Tatsuya tells her he won't ask her out, but wants to see if he can become a man capable of making her happy and competing with Kazuya first. Kazuya later reveals he overheard this. The three move forward, with the understanding that they eventually will compete for Minami, and each one resolves to do their best to rise to the others' expectations.
25	"Minami's longest day! Kat-chan, hurry up and come!" Transliteration: "Minami no ichiban nagai hi! Hayaku kite Katchan!!" (Japanese: 南の一番長い日!早く来てカッちゃん!!)	September 29, 1985
Kazuya leaves early for his biggest match yet. Tatsuya follows him to school with a good luck charm, but loops back when he somehow arrives before Kazuya. At the start of the match, neither of them are anywhere to be found. The game begins without Kazuya. Tatsuya appears and drags his parents out of the stands to go to the hospital, and tells Harada to send Minami there after the game.
26	"End of the tournament! If you weren't there..." Transliteration: "Shiai shūryō! Kimi ga inakereba..." (Japanese: 試合終了!君がいなければ...)	October 6, 1985
Tatsuya and his family travel to the hospital, and Minami leaves the game early to follow them. When they get there they find out Kazuya has been hit by a truck and passed away.
27	"Summer was too short...Goodbye, Kat-chan!"; Transliteration: "Mijikasugita natsu ... Katchan ni sayonara!" (Japanese: 短かすぎた夏...カッちゃんにさよなら!)	October 13, 1985
Tatsuya and Minami remember fond moments with Kazuya and attempt to cope with his death.
28	"What's a baseball team without an ace..." Transliteration: "Ēsu no inai yakyūbu nante..." (Japanese: エースのいない野球部なんて...)	October 20, 1985
School starts up again. The classes and clubs acutely feel the loss of Kazuya.
29	"What? Tender Tat-chan's boxer status!?" Transliteration: "Are? Yasashī Tatchan bokusā shikkaku!?" (Japanese: アレ?優しいタッちゃんボクサー失格!?)	October 27, 1985
Tatsuya faces off against last year's regional champ in a boxing match. He wins despite all odds by points. However the captain attempts to kick him out of the club and encourages him to join the baseball club, because Kuroki gave him his favorite idol's autograph
30	"There's no reason not to use the glorious Number 1"; Transliteration: "Eikō no sebangō 1 yatte yarenai wake wa nai" (Japanese: 栄光の背番号1やってやれない訳はない)	November 3, 1985
Tensions run high as Tatsuya joins the baseball team. He and Kotaro clash in particular. Hard offers support. Kuroki starts coaching Tatsuya on pitching.
31	"Tatsuya on the mound! Control is another story, however" Transliteration: "Gōwan Tatsuya! Demo kontorōru ga kadai desu" (Japanese: 剛腕達也!でもコントロールが課題です)	November 10, 1985
Tatsuya keeps practicing his pitching. He suggests putting up a photo of Kazuya in the playhouse.
32	"Kazuya's dear wife, but the worry is about the stupid brother" Transliteration: "Ore wa Kazuya no koinyōbō demo kininaru baka aniki" (Japanese: 俺は和也の恋女房でも気になるバカ兄貴)	November 17, 1985
Kotaro and Tatsuya begin to see other sides of each other, and appreciating each other more. They both make gestures of reconciliation.
33	"Birth of a rhythmic gymnastics star! Minami has a natural gift!?" Transliteration: "Tanjō shintaisō no hoshi! Minami wa yappari tensai!?" (Japanese: 誕生新体操の星!南はやっぱり天才!?)	November 24, 1985
Minami participates in the rhythmic gymnastics tournament and does so well she has a real shot at entering more tournaments. Takeshi Yoshida joins the school as a transfer student and attempts to befriend Tatsuya.
34	"Good luck, Tatsuya! The exhilaration of taking the mound for the first time" Transliteration: "Ganbare Tatsuya! Hara hara doki doki hatsu tōban" (Japanese: がんばれ達也!ハラハラドキドキ初登板)	December 1, 1985
Tatsuya participates in his first game and does much better than expected. Minami arrives late as she was practicing gymnastics. They have a brief disagreement, then Tatsuya gives it his all. He ends up passing out, but not before accidentally making a home run.
35	"One way or another you're cornered!? Current rumours of Minami!"; Transliteration: "Nanika to shinpai!? Chikagoro uwasa no Minami-chan!" (Japanese: 何かと心配!?近頃ウワサの南ちゃん!)	December 8, 1985
Tatsuya visits Yoshida's house, and Yoshida expresses his admiration. He then joins the baseball team in order to emulate Tatsuya. His male dog falls in love with Punch. Minami continues practicing gymnastics.
36	"Alone together! Minami and Tatsuya's dangerous night!?" Transliteration: "Futari kiri! Minami to Tatsuya no abunai yoru!?" (Japanese: 2人きり!南と達也のアブナイ夜!?)	December 15, 1985
Yoshida becomes the backup pitcher. Tatsuya runs into a mysterious man at the book store. Tatsuya and Minami spend a night alone together, and are unusually honest with each other. Then, an earthquake strikes and Minami clings to Tatsuya in fear.
37	"Aim for Kōshien! The baseball club is in the middle of camp!" Transliteration: "Mezase Kōshien! Tadaima yakyūbu gasshukuchū!!" (Japanese: めざせ甲子園!ただいま野球部合宿中!!)	December 22, 1985
The baseball club begins the camp. Minami adopts some puppies.
38	"First round preliminaries! Strategist Tat-chan enters!?" Transliteration: "Yosen ikkaisen! Zunōha Tatchan tōjō!?" (Japanese: 予選一回戦!頭脳派タッちゃん登場!?)	December 29, 1985
It's his first official game, and while Tatsuya won't admit it it's clear he is nervous. The team wins their game
39	"Show of competence! Cool Nitta and Tenacious Nishimura!"; Transliteration: "Jitsuryoku haiken! Kūru na Nitta to Gattsu Nishimura!!" (Japanese: 実力拝見!クールな新田とガッツ西村!!)	January 5, 1986
The game against Nishimura begins.
40	"A heated second round! Tat-chan vs. Tenacious Nishimura"; Transliteration: "Nettō nikaisen! Tatchan tai Gattsu Nishimura" (Japanese: 熱投2回戦!タッちゃんvsガッツ西村!!)	January 12, 1986
The game goes into extra innings. Nishimura becomes increasingly stressed.
41	"11th inning in the rain! Bases loaded with 2 outs! Batter Nishimura"; Transliteration: "Ame no enchō jūichi kai! Nishi manrui!! Battā Nishimura" (Japanese: 雨の延長11回!2死満塁!!バッター西村)	January 19, 1986
Meisei loses the game, and Kuroki and Sachiko have to abandon their dream of going to the Koshien.
42	"Another extra inning!? The four-sided love affair about Minami"; Transliteration: "Mō hitotsu no enchōsen!? Minami o meguru shikaku kankei" (Japanese: もう一つの延長戦!?南をめぐる四角関係)	January 26, 1986
Practice begins without the seniors, and Kotaro is the new captain. Nishimura, Nitta Minami and Tatsuya have an awkward meal together. It is clear both Nishimura and Nitta like Minami. Tatsuya and Minami discuss the nature of their relationship.
43	"Shake up Tatsuya the ace! Minami & Nitta's dangerous relationship!?" Transliteration: "Yureru ēsu Tatsuya!! Nitta to Minami ga kyūsekkin!?" (Japanese: 揺れるエース達也!!新田と南が急接近!?)	February 2, 1986
The team splits up for a practice match. Yoshida's pitching is not as good as Tatsuya's pitching. Nitta stops by the school to interview Minami. He is asked to hit a pitch for a photo. He hits Tatsuya's pitch, but Yoshida gets him out and reveals the talent he was hiding.
44	"Yuka's detective story! Where did Minami & Tatsuya go?" Transliteration: "Yuka no tantei monogatari! Minami to Tatsuya wa doko e yuku" (Japanese: 由加の探偵物語!南と達也はどこへ行く)	February 9, 1986
Tatsuya feels sick and goes home from school early. Nishimura calls the wrong number so Tatsuya impersonates Minami and tells hm to meet "Minami" for a movie date. Minami and Tatsuya go out to see a movie themselves the next day. That night, Nishimura realizes Tatsuya is the reason he was stood up.
45	"Challenge to the ace! I'm Uesugi's rival!" Transliteration: "Ēsu o nerae! Boku ga Uesugi no raibaru da!!" (Japanese: エースを狙え!僕が上杉のライバルだ!!)	February 16, 1986
Yoshida's athletic abilities begin to rival Tatsuya's, and all of a sudden he is popular as well. Yoshida stops idolizing him and begins to believe not only that they are rivals, but that he is better than Tatsuya. A real rivalry begins between the two of them. Tatsuya misses proactice as he saves Nitta's sister from a river, and brings her home. Note: the title of this episode is a reference to the famous tennis anime.
46	"Rival declaration! Surpassing Uesugi Kazuya!"; Transliteration: "Raibaru sengen! Uesugi Kazuya o koetekure!!" (Japanese: ライバル宣言!上杉和也を越えてくれ!!)	February 23, 1986
Akio Nitta takes Tatsuya home. Sumi Tech requests a practice match with Meisei. The coach decides Yoshida will pitch for the match, and Tatsuya will play right field.
47	"Showdown with Sumiko! What? The pitcher is Yoshida!!"; Transliteration: "Taiketsu Sumikō! E!? Pitchā Yoshida!!" (Japanese: 対決須見工!えッ!?ピッチャー吉田!!)	March 2, 1986
Yoshida keep hits to a zero. He tries to impress Nitta's sister but she claims he didn't hit Yoshida's pitch because he didn't want to. Tatsuya has some good and some errors in the outfield. Nishimura hears about the practice match and bikes all the way from Seiran to Meisei, but ends up at Meisei temple instead due to incorrect directions. The coach has Yoshida and Tatsuya switch positions after the 5th inning.
48	"Uesugi appears at last! Nitta, I'll be victorious!" Transliteration: "Tsui ni Uesugi tōjō! Nitta, ore to shōbu da!!" (Japanese: 遂に上杉登場!新田、オレと勝負だ!!)	March 9, 1986
With Tatsuya as pitcher Meisei gains a run, but also gives one up. Tatsuya wonders if Kazuya would have let Nitta get the hit, and what Kazuya thought about when on the mound. When Minami asks him to take her to the Koshien he understands, but worries about his capabilities and feelings for her in contrast to the deceased Kazuya.
49	"Brother, don't give up! Kōshien's in sight!" Transliteration: "Dame aniki henjō! Kōshien ga mietekita!!" (Japanese: ダメ兄貴返上!甲子園が見えてきた!!)	March 16, 1986
Tatsuya becomes popular among girls after the practice game. Yoshida demands a match between teammates to determine which pitcher will be the ace, and the coach agrees. The next day he finds out his family is moving to another country.
50	"A date after school!? Minami & Nitta's dangerous relationship!" Transliteration: "Hōkago dēto!? Minami to Nitta wa abunai kankei!!" (Japanese: 放課後デート!?南と新田は危ない関係!!)	March 23, 1986
Akio Nitta is hospitalized after falling off his bike giving Minami a ride home. She begins to visit him at the hospital daily. Yuka Nitta begins to show interest in applying to Meisei next year, obstensibly to spy on the baseball team, but really because she is interested in Tatsuya herself.
51	"Unacceptable!? Minami declares her love to Tatsuya!"; Transliteration: "Nattoku shinai!? Minami ga Tatsuya ni koibito sengen!!" (Japanese: 納得しない!?南が達也に恋人宣言!!)	March 30, 1986
Minami continues to visit Nitta at the hospital, and Yuka continues to spy on Meisei's practices. Minami ends up telling Nitta that she and Tatsuya are going out.
52	"A love triangle! You're a bother!" Transliteration: "Koi no sangen chūkei! Jamamono wa omae da!!" (Japanese: 恋の三元中継!ジャマ者はお前だ!!)	April 6, 1986
Nishimura strongarms Minami into a date. Yuka pressures Tatsuya to spend time with her as a "tutor". Nitta runs into Minami and Nishimura right as Nishimura is torn away from their date by his club manager. Minami stays for dinner with the Nitta family.
53	"Tatsuya's extracurricular lessons ... Thinking too much about love!" Transliteration: "Tatsuya no kagai jugyō ... Omoisugoshi mo koi no uchi!" (Japanese: 達也の課外授業...思い過ごしも恋の内!)	April 13, 1986
Minami and Nitta and Tatsuya and Yuka run into each other on their respective "dates". Both become jealous and they begin fighting. After Tatsuya stands up for her against Nishimura, they end up talking about their feelings, admitting to jealousy, and Tatsuya offers to stand aside if he can't beat Nitta, like Minami offered if he ever met a nice girl so long ago.
54	"Finally, the last Kōshien!"; Transliteration: "Dainibu kan: Iyoiyo saigo no Kōshien dazo!!" (Japanese: いよいよ最後の甲子園だゾ!!)	April 20, 1986
Meisei and Sumi Tech have their graduation ceremonies. Minami is forced to delay her date with Tatsuya, and he goes to see Sumi Tech's graduation ceremony. Nishimura continues to stalk Minami.
55	"Highlights: Memories are too beautiful..." Transliteration: "Sōshūhen: Omoide wa utsukushisugite..." (Japanese: 総集編·思い出は美し過ぎて...)	April 27, 1986
A recap episode that sums up the series up to episode 24.
56	"Highlights: Don't surrender the ace position to anyone!" Transliteration: "Sōshūhen: Ēsu wa dare ni mo watasanai!" (Japanese: 総集編·エースは誰にも渡さない!)	May 4, 1986
Another recap episode, covering episodes 25 through about episode 48.
57	"A mysterious new coach turns up!" Transliteration: "Nazo no shinkantoku ga yattekuru!!" (Japanese: 謎の新監督がやってくる!!)	May 11, 1986
It's the start of a new school year, but the coach has collapsed and is hospitalized! He calls on former Meisei baseball club captain Eijirou Kashiwaba to be the interim coach. Yuka is now a first year at Meisei and constantly flirts with Tatsuya. She also becomes a new manager for the baseball team.
58	"I'm Kashiwaba! I won't forgive the spoiled children!" Transliteration: "Ore wa Kashiwaba! Amattare wa yurusanai!!" (Japanese: オレは柏葉!甘ったれは許さない!!)	May 18, 1986
Coach Kashiwaba beats Tatsuya in the clubhouse. He kicks Minami off the team as manager and hazes the club members. Since the principal hired him on the condition that no one intereferes with his teaching methods, nothing can be done.
59	"Tempest at the Meisei baseball club! Another problem after Minami leaves" Transliteration: "Arashi no Meisei yakyū-bu! Minami ga satte mata ichinan" (Japanese: 嵐の明青野球部!南が去ってまた一難)	May 25, 1986
Over half the new recruits quit the baseball team because of the new coach. There is one new recruit, Sakada, who joins because of his crush on Yuka. The new coach shows no signs of relenting. Minami is so angry she actually chases Nishimura off for once.
60	"Hard-fighting new coach! Minami's still number one" Transliteration: "Shin manejā daikusen! Yappari Minami ga ichiban" (Japanese: 新マネジャー大苦戦!やっぱり南が一番)	June 1, 1986
The coach continues to crack down on the team. Yuka is unable to adequately perform her manager duties due to her lack of care or focus. Nishimura shows up and yells at the dog that always follows coach Kashiwaba around. When the coach sees this he beat him until he bleeds, and only stops when Minami intervenes.
61	"Hey Kashiwaba! Minami is the bet in the contest!" Transliteration: "Oi Kashiwaba! Minami o kakete shōbu da!!" (Japanese: オイ柏葉!南を賭けて勝負だ!!)	June 8, 1986
Nishimura threatens to go public with the events, but becomes so riled up by Kashiwaba he ends up challenging him to hit his curveball. Kashiwaba doesn't swing and gets three strikes, then tells Tatsuya the timing and asks him to swing. If he misses, Tatsuya gets more roadwork and practice hits. If not, he dares coach to let Minami back on the team. After two strikes Nishimura realizes Tatsuya will hit it, the last pitch is a straight, which Tatsuya then misses and loses the bet.
62	"Sepia-coloured couple! Minami & Nitta's beach story" Transliteration: "Sepia iro no futari! Minami to Nitta no kaigan monogatari" (Japanese: セピア色の2人!南と新田の海岸物語)	June 15, 1986
It turns out that the man Coach Nishio recommended as a great persona and memorable teammate was Kashiwaba Eichirou, not Kashiwaba Eijirou, who was his younger brother who consistently harassed the team for the short time he was a part of it. Nitta takes Minami to the beach at sunset and encourages her.
63	"The secret behind the sunglasses! What kind of person is Kashiwaba?"; Transliteration: "Sangurasu no oku no himitsu! Kashiwaba wa nanimono?" (Japanese: サングラスの奥の秘密!柏葉は何者?)	June 22, 1986
Kashiwaba visits the coffee shop and mocks Tatsuya for his brother's death. Minami and Tatsuya attempt to figure out what he was like as a student but his records are missing. Koutaro organizes a practice match against Seinan, but it happens to be the same day as Minami's gymnastics tournament.
64	"No rules of the practice game! We're watching the demon manager" Transliteration: "Jingi naki renshū jiai! Oni kantoku no otenami haiken" (Japanese: 仁義なき練習試合!鬼監督のお手並拝見)	June 29, 1986
Kashiwaba has the starting line up full of first years with no experience in the game. Because of the catcher, Tatsuya can't pitch at full capacity. Due to their huge lead, Seinan calls it halfway through. Kashiwaba blames the loss on Tatsuya and makes the team practice more. Nishimura injures his elbow overusing his curveball but refuses treatment.
65	"Go for it, Minami. It's not suitable to give up!" Transliteration: "Ganbare Minami. Gibu appu wa niawanai!!" (Japanese: ガンバレ南!ギブ·アップは似合わない!!)	July 6, 1986
Minami places fifth at the tournament, missing the podium and just barely qualifying for regionals. After Tatsuya attempts to cheer her up she resolves to put in all her effort to gymnastics for the first time at regionals.
66	"Minami is the student council president? An idol one way or another!" Transliteration: "Minami ga seito kaichō? Aidoru wa nanika to taihen!" (Japanese: 南が生徒会長?アイドルは何かと大変!)	July 13, 1986
In order to focus on gymnastics, Minami stays up till 3 doing the homework. She is then nominated student council president. After ending up in the nurse's office and unable to practice due to her overworking herself, she declines the student council position.
67	"Oh-oh, we're beginning to see! Coach Kashiwaba's true character!" Transliteration: "Mumu mitekitazo! Kashiwaba kantoku no shōtai!!" (Japanese: ムムッ見えてきたぞ!柏葉監督の正体!)	July 20, 1986
Kashiwaba continues to haze players, even when they're injured. Tatsuya defends the injured player, and does his portion. Minami learns the truth about Kashiwaba from Harada. After seeing what Nitta is putting himself through for practice, Tatsuya no longer cares about the hazing as he chooses to rise to meet the challenge to go to the Koshien.
68	"Stop Tatsuya! Yuka's forced dating strategy!" Transliteration: "Sutoppu za Tatsuya! Yuka no muriyari dēto sakusen!!" (Japanese: ストップ·ザ·達也!由加のむりやりデート作戦!!)	July 27, 1986
Kashiwaba cancels practice for once, as it seems like he might have injured his arm. Yuka pressures Tatsuya into going on a date despite her injured foot.
69	"The Kōshien dream! Don't rush your resignation!" Transliteration: "Yume wa Kōshien! Taibu todoke wa awatezu ni!!" (Japanese: 夢は甲子園!退部届はあわてずに!!)	August 3, 1986
Nakajima, the regular shortstop, quits the team. Narita is promoted to a regular but struggles.
70	"Summer is soon! How many more dropout troubles" Transliteration: "Natsu majika! Doko made tsuzuku ochikobore sōdō" (Japanese: 夏まじか!どこまで続く落ちこぼれ騒動)	August 10, 1986
It seems like there is more to Nakajima's reasons for quitting than just coach Kashiwaba. Kashiwaba spots Nakajima at the hospital while they are both skipping practice. Nakajima is losing his vision. Coach tells him that he is not, he is only afraid of the ball, and making excuses. It turns out to be the result of stress, and the doctor encourages him to resume exercising.
71	"Summer camp starts! The evil coach is waiting!" Transliteration: "Natsu gasshuku totsunyū! Oni kantoku ga matteiru!!" (Japanese: 夏合宿突入!鬼監督が待っている!!)	August 17, 1986
Training camp begins and Kashiwaba makes a point to work the children to exhaustion while working out his personal grudge.
72	"Scarier than the demon? Lady Yuka's cooking camp!" Transliteration: "Oni yori kowai? Ojō-sama Yuka no gasshuku ryōri!!" (Japanese: 鬼より怖い?お嬢様由加の合宿料理!!)	August 24, 1986
The team gets a bit of a break after Yuka turns the coach's clock back an hour. Yuka starts studying a cookbook to learn to cook for the team. It's so bad no one eats it, and after hours they head to Minami's coffee shop, where coincidentally Kashiwaba is headed as well.
73	"Chef Yuka! It's a long hard road to be a gourmet chef!" Transliteration: "Hōchōnin Yuka! Gurume no michi wa kewashiku tōi!!" (Japanese: 包丁人由加!グルメの道は険しく遠い!!)	August 31, 1986
Minami tries to subtly give Yuka a recipe, but she discards it. She spent much money making another bad meal instead. The team still believes in Kashiwaba's good intentions, out of ignorance.
74	"Finally! Cooking battle between Minami & Yuka"; Transliteration: "Tsui ni kita! Minami to Yuka no kukkingu dai sensō" (Japanese: 遂にきた!南と由加のクッキング大戦争)	September 14, 1986
Minami cooks a meal, but inspired by Yuka's determination Sakata discards it before she sees it. Kashiwaba's eyes are suffering. Minami confronts Yuka about discarding her meal. Kashiwaba finally bats against Tatsuya, and hits one of his pitches.
75	"End of the cooking trouble!? Secret taste is from Minami's spice" Transliteration: "Oryōri sōdō kanketsu!? Kakushi aji wa Minami no supaisu" (Japanese: お料理騒動完結!?隠し味は南のスパイス)	September 21, 1986
Tatsuya encourages Yuka, so she returns and finds the "traditional" meal plan she discarded earlier from Minami. Harada tells Tatsuya he is holding Minami back, and thus he tries to put some emotional distance between them, continuing to support her whilst being more independent himself.
76	"Thinking of the floor exercise! Minami is waiting for Tatsuya!?"; Transliteration: "Kinishite shintaisō! Minami wa Tatsuya o matteiru!?" (Japanese: 気にして新体操!南は達也を待っている!?)	September 28, 1986
Minami begins regionals. Tatsuya misses the train and is late. She wins first place and he has to reckon with the fact that she can succeed without him there.
77	"First match of the competition! Now summer is here!" Transliteration: "Yosen kumiawase kettei! Iyoiyo natsu honban!!" (Japanese: 予選組み合わせ決定!いよいよ夏本番!!)	October 5, 1986
Kashiwaba makes his players train in the rain, but Yuka is the one who catches a cold. Tatsuya prepares for his last chance to honor Kazuya's dream of going to the Koshien.
78	"Highlights: Asakura Minami is 18! Now is the time for youth!" Transliteration: "Sōshūhen I: Asakura Minami wa 18-sai! Tadaima seishun shinkōkei!!" (Japanese: 総集編·浅倉南18才!ただいま青春進行形!!)	October 12, 1986
A recap episode from Minami's perspective.
79	"Highlights: Fight Meisei! Kashiwaba doesn't scare us" Transliteration: "Soushuuhen II: Faito Meisei!! Kashiwaba nanka kowakunai" (Japanese: 総集編·ファイト明青!!柏葉なんか怖くない)	October 19, 1986
A recap episode centered around Kashiwaba.
80	"Today is the first round! We're not going to lose!" Transliteration: "Honjitsu yosen ikkaisen! Yaruki dake wa makenaize!!" (Japanese: 本日予選一回戦!やる気だけは負けないぜ!!)	October 26, 1986
Kashiwaba has to start regular treatment for his eyes, or he will go blind. The first game in the prelims for the Koshien begins, against Seta High. Kashiwaba bullies Tatsuya and Kotaro for caring about Kazuya, then puts Sasaki, who has never pitched or done much more than pick up balls at practice, as pitcher in Tatsuya's place.
81	"First battle is no problem! The real enemy is Kashiwaba!?"; Transliteration: "Tondemonai ikkaisen! Hontō no teki wa Kashiwaba!?" (Japanese: とんでもない一回戦!本当の敵は柏葉!?)	November 2, 1986
Sasaki gives up five runs on balls in the first inning since he has never previously trained as a pitcher. Kashiwaba claims he put him in as a handicap, in order to make the game more important and stressful for the team. The game is almost called in Seta's favor, but Meisei manages to score a run when Sasaki gets on base. Kashiwaba was likely attempting to tank the team, but he sticks to his promise and puts Tatsuya in. Meisei makes a comeback and wins the game.
82	"I can see! Kashiwaba brother's secret" Transliteration: "Mietazo! Kashiwaba kyōdai no fukai nazo" (Japanese: 見えたぞ!柏葉兄弟のふかーい謎)	November 9, 1986
The elder Kashiwaba visits Meisei to see Coach Nishio and the baseball team, unaware his brother is coaching them and attempting to prevent their advance to the Koshien. Minami doesn't trust him, and thus hides the truth from him. It is revealed the Kashiwaba siblings and Eichirou's current wife once had a similar relationship to Kazuya, Tatsuya and Minami. Kashiwaba Eijirou's determination to ruin the baseball team solidifies further.
83	"What will Tatsuya do in the second round! Kōtarō's in a pinch!!" Transliteration: "Dōsuru Tatsuya nikaisen! Kōtarō dai pinchi!!" (Japanese: どうする達也二回戦!孝太郎大ピンチ!!)	November 16, 1986
Kotarou injures himself during practice. Minami and Kashiwaba discuss his brother. Kotarou hides his injured shoulder from the team, and Kashiwaba notices, so he puts him in. Tatsuya realizes, and attempts to end it in as few pitches as possible, knowing the two of them are a team and Meisei can't win without Kotarou. Meisei wins the game.
84	"Yuka-chan in danger! Don't force the date so much" Transliteration: "Yuka-chan kiki ippatsu!! Oshikake dēto mo hodohodo ni" (Japanese: 由加チャン危機一髪!!押しかけデートもほどほどに)	November 23, 1986
Tatsuya's parents are out, and both Yuka and Minami stop by, and Tatsuya hides Yuka from Minami. On her way home, Yuka is attacked by a murderer with a knife, but Sasaki pushes her out of the way, giving her enough time to turn around and beat the man up.
85	"Unforgettable showdown! It's about time for his comeback!" Transliteration: "Shūnen no taiketsu!? Imagoro aitsuga kamubakku!" (Japanese: 執念の対決!今頃あいつがカムバック!)	November 30, 1986
Yoshida has finally returned from South America, and announces that he is now the pitcher for Sada Trade School, the next opponent. The long-awaited face off between rivals finally begins.
86	"I'm not going to lose the third time! Behold the power of the ace!" Transliteration: "Makete tamaru ka sankaisen! ēsu no chikara o misete yaru!" (Japanese: 負けてたまるか三回戦!エースの力を見せてやる!)	December 7, 1986
Neither pitcher allows the other team to score a single point. Then in the seventh inning Kotarou hits a home run. After that, Yoshida's anxiety gets to him, and Meisei ends up scoring seven points in one inning, winning it in a called game.
87	"Unexpected!? Kashiwaba's romance! An awakening of love like Minami's"; Transliteration: "Igai!? Kashiwaba romansu! Minami ni niteiru koigokoro" (Japanese: 意外!?柏葉ロマンス!南に似ている恋心)	December 14, 1986
Sumi Tech advances in the prelims. Kashiwaba drops his wallet in front of Minami, and a photo of a woman falls out. Minami runs into her later, and discovers her to be the current wife of the coach's older brother. She claims that the Kashiwaba Eijirou she knew was kind and would never be violent or take revenge, calling into question the Coach's true goals and motives.
88	"It's not revenge!? No signs in the fourth game!!" Transliteration: "Fukushū janai!? Nō sain de yonkaisen!" (Japanese: 復讐じゃない!?NOサインで4回戦!!)	December 21, 1986
Minami tells Eijirou Kashiwaba what Reiko Kashiwaba said about him. Kashiwaba refuses to handicap the team in the next game, but he doesn't give them any signs, either. Meisei wins, but their offense is unorganized in execution. The team receives a gift from Eichirou Kashiwaba, who is unaware his brother is the coach, and Eijirou Kashiwaba burns it.
89	"Tatsuya's the ace? Feeling the pressure!?" Transliteration: "Tatsuya wa ēsu? Senaka ni kanjiru puresshā!?" (Japanese: 達也はエース?背中に感じるプレッシャー!?)	December 28, 1986
Due to the pressure, Tatsuya plays hooky before the next game. Coach Kashiwaba's eyes get worse, and he experiences moments of blindness, but perseveres in order to crush the hopes of the Meisei team. Tatsuya talks to Minami about coping with his nerves and measuring up to Kazuya. Minami notes how much he has grown.
90	"Round before the semifinals! Meisei vs. 3 pitchers!?" Transliteration: "Junjun kesshō! Meisei tai pitchā ga sannin!?" (Japanese: 準々決勝!明青VSピッチャーが3人!?)	January 4, 1987
The next team Meisei plays relies on strategy to beat their opponents. Meisei struggles to figure out how to beat them without advice from a coach, and Tatsuya in particular is feeling the pressure.
91	"It's unexpected!? The game's not over yet!" Transliteration: "Ban kuruwase!? Mada mada shōbu wa wakaranai!" (Japanese: 番狂わせ!?まだまだ勝負は判らない!)	January 11, 1987
Meisei comes very close to losing after giving up a run near the end, but makes a comeback in the last inning. Seinan loses their game, and Nishimura talks to Tatsuya the next day. Due to his overuse of his pitches and refusal to rest his arm, he damaged it and lost the ability to control his pitches. He encourages Tatsuya despite his own loss.
92	"Distressing image pile up! Tatsuya's more than Minami expected!" Transliteration: "Setsunai imēji kasanaru ne! Tatsuya wa Minami no yosō ijō!" (Japanese: せつないイメージ重なるネ!達也は南の予想以上!)	January 18, 1987
Minami and her father discuss the differences between Kazuya and Tatsuya, and what Tatsuya may be feeling since he chose to follow his deceased twin's path. The team gets ready for their next game.
93	"Here it comes!? Coach's order! Wounded heart, enduring Kashiwaba's program!" Transliteration: "Deta!? Kantoku meirei! Kokoro ni kizu motsu Kashiwaba saihai!" (Japanese: 出た!?監督命令!心に傷持つ柏葉采配!)	January 25, 1987
The game begins, and Coach tells Tatsuya if he gets three hits he will put in a different pitcher. The school's advisor comments that it was generous to allow him three instead of one, which causes the Coach to choke. Due to his advice, a regular outfielder gets his first homerun. Reiko watches the game and asks Minami to talk to him, but refuses to herself.
94	"In the middle of the semi-finals! Tat-chan going for the big new record!" Transliteration: "Junkesshō massaichū! Naruka Tatchan daikiroku!" (Japanese: 準決勝真最中!なるかタッちゃん大記録!)	February 1, 1987
Tatsuya manages to keep their opponents hitless for the entire game. Meisei moves onto the finals despite Kashiwaba's consistent sabotage.
95	"Celebrate, victory of the finals! Our fate lies in Kashiwaba's hand!" Transliteration: "Shuku, kesshō shinshutsu! Unmei wa Kashiwaba no te no naka ni!" (Japanese: 祝·決勝進出!運命は柏葉の手の中に!)	February 8, 1987
Mr. Asakura accidentally gets Harada drunk, and he tells Minami that he's worried Tatsuya is purely emulating Kazuya. Coach Nishio returns. However, he does not want to lead the team against Sumi Tech. He talks to Coach Kashiwaba privately and praises him, Kashiwaba Eijirou, as a coach, also revealing that he knows his true identity.
96	"One more to get to Kōshien! Hope! Kazuya's promise" Transliteration: "Ato hitotsu de Kōshien! Kanaetai! Kazuya no yakusoku" (Japanese: あと1つで甲子園!叶えたい!和也の約束)	February 15, 1987
Coach steps on broken glass and hurts himself, but is shocked by the team's support and dedication, and his own fears for them. Tatsuya and Minami visit Kazuya's grave. Tatsuya talks about how he feels Kazuya is always with him, and pitches for him, saying that if they make it to the Koshien it will be Kazuya, not he, who led them there. Akio Nitta tells Minami he aims to play his best and bring out Tatsuya's true ability, not the ability that is merely copying Kazuya.
97	"Go go Meisei! Play ball to victory!" Transliteration: "Gō Gō Meisei! Shōri ni mukatte purē bōru!" (Japanese: GoGo明青!勝利に向かってプレーボール!)	February 22, 1987
Minami pleads the coach to help them win the final game to fulfill his own dreams. The game against Sumi Tech begins, and all the students, graduated players, parents and others turn up, including Coach Nishio and Nishimura accompanying his baseball manager.
98	"Finals for whom!? See the real Tatsuya!"; Transliteration: "Dare no Tame no kesshōsen!? Hontō no Tatsuya o misete!" (Japanese: 誰のための決勝戦!?本当の達也を見せて!)	March 1, 1987
As Tatsuya continues to emulate Kazuya's playing style, Meisei quickly gives up a few key runs, although they don't fall far behind Sumi Tech. Akio Nitta is not motivated to play his best against an imitation Kazuya. But when Coach Kashiwaba speaks to Tatsuya and, albeit rudely, tells him to play as and for himself, Tatsuya regains hope and gets his head back in the game. With two innings left the coach contemplates giving advice for the first time.
99	"No more chances!? It's coming! The Kashiwaba sign!" Transliteration: "Mō ato ga nai!? Deruka! Kashiwaba sain!" (Japanese: もう後が無い!?出るか!柏葉サイン!)	March 8, 1987
Tatsuya convinces the coach to call his first time out. He gives four of the players advice before their turn at bat, and Meisei ties it up. He gives Tatsuya pitching advice but refuses to call it a 'Coach's order' instead calling it 'probability.' Tatsuya disregards this and Nitta gets a crucial home run. The game goes into a tenth inning, and despite the team realizing Coach Kashiwaba's periodical blindness and the fact that he doesn't know their signs, he gets Tatsuya to steal home, getting ahead at the top of the tenth.
100	"Let's win Meisei! Kōshien is waiting for us!" Transliteration: "Katsuzo Meisei! Kōshien wa oretachi o matteiru!" (Japanese: 勝つぞ明青!甲子園は俺たちを待っている!)	March 15, 1987
Nitta gets an at bat, and could easily get another homerun. Instead of walking him Meisei chooses to pitch to him for real. After many foul balls he strikes out, and Meisei wins the prelims and will be going to the Koshien. Minami takes Coach Kashiwaba to the hospital for his eyes. She and Tatsuya visit him the next day, and Tatsuya gives the ball from the game to him.
101	"New starting line, from Tatsuya Uesugi to Minami Asakura..."; Transliteration: "Atarashii stāto rain, Uesugi Tatsuya wa Asakura Minami o..." (Japanese: 新しいスタートライン·上杉達也は浅倉南を...)	March 22, 1987
After getting a ticket to the Koshien, Minami asks Tatsuya for one more thing. He is unable to reply to her, and feels now that he's achieved all their dreams he's back at square one, and he doesn't know himself. Back at the coffee shop Mr. Asakura asks Tatsuya to make Minami happy and marry her one day, but Tatsuya refuses and leaves. Minami overhears the conversation. On the way to the Koshien, Tatsuya has to truly consider who he is and what he wants to do and what motivates him for the first time in years. As he contemplates he realizes that Minami is more important to him than winning the Koshien, and he calls her up and asks her to attend personally, because he loves her more than anyone else.

== Staff ==
- Planning: Tadashi Oka (Fuji TV) & Yoshirō Kataoka (ADK), in cooperation with Kiyoshi Usami (OB Planning)
- Executive Producers: Yoshinobu Nakao (Fuji TV), Chihiro Kameyama (Fuji TV), Masashi Fujihara, Shigetsugu Tsuiki
- Art Director: Shichirō Kobayashi
- Backgrounds: Kobayashi Production
- Photography: Studio Gallop
- Music Director: Fusanobu Fujiyama
- Music Work: Zack Promotion
- Music: Hiroaki Serizawa
- Assistant Animation Director: Minoru Maeda
- Series Bungei Organization: Yumiko Takaboshi, Satoshi Namiki
- Title Animation: Gisaburō Sugii, Minoru Maeda, Akinori Nagaoka
- Animation Director: Tsuneo Maeda
- Series Director: Hiroko Tokita
- Assistant Director: Gisaburō Sugii
- Production Assistance: Studio Junio, Studio Gallop, Kitty Films
- Production: Toho, Group TAC, ADK

== Theme songs ==
Opening
Episodes 1-27: Touch, by Yoshimi Iwasaki
Episodes 28-56: Ai ga Hitoribotchi, by Yoshimi Iwasaki
Episodes 57-79: Che! Che! Che!, by Yoshimi Iwasaki
Episodes 80-93: Hitoribotchi no Duet, by Yumekojo
Episodes 94-101: Jōnetsu Monogatari, by Yoshimi Iwasaki
Ending
Episodes 1-27: Kimi ga Inakereba, by Yoshimi Iwasaki
Episodes 28-62: Seishun, by Yoshimi Iwasaki
Episodes 63-79: Yakusoku, by Yoshimi Iwasaki
Episodes 80-101: Kimi wo Tobashita Gogo, by Yumekojo
