= Only One Night (1922 film) =

1922 film

- Directed by: Rudolf Walther-Fein
- Written by: M.O. Green
- Starring: Bruno Eichgrün; Joseph Römer; Olga Engl
- Cinematography: Josef Dietze; Kurt Lande
- Production company: Aafa-Film
- Release date: 21 April 1922
- Country: Germany
- Languages: Silent; German intertitles

Only One Night (German: Nur eine Nacht) is a 1922 German silent film directed by Rudolf Walther-Fein and starring Bruno Eichgrün, Joseph Römer, and Olga Engl. It was one of several German silent films featuring the detective Nick Carter.

== Cast ==
- Bruno Eichgrün as Nick Carter
- Joseph Römer as Gadvan, sein Freund
- Olga Engl as Gräfin Erdony
- Robert Scholz as Stefan, ihr Sohn
- Ida Perry as Mila Ibranya
- Rudolf Hilberg as Graf Beiros
- Margarete Kupfer as Die alte Safi
- Sybill Morel as Feri, Safis Enkelin
- Margit Barnay as Lonya
- Gustav Jahrbeck as Bela, Safis Pflegesohn
- Paul Hardtmuth as Boka, ein alter Zigeuner
- Max Ruhbeck as Polizeirat
- Erna Böwe as Zofe
- Max Neumann as Kammerdiener
- Albert Paulig as Schnoddriger Herr

== Bibliography ==
- Caneppele, Paolo (2002). Entscheidungen der Tiroler Filmzensur: 1922–1938. Vienna: Film Archiv Austria. ISBN 978-3-901932-12-0.
