= Thomas Chalmers (disambiguation) =

Thomas Chalmers was a Scottish divine and a leader of the Free Church of Scotland.

Thomas Chalmers is also the name of:

- Thomas Chalmers (rugby) (1850–1926), Scottish rugby player
- Thomas A. Chalmers, for whom the Szilard–Chalmers effect is named
- Dr. Thomas C. Chalmers (1917–1995), proponent of the randomized controlled trial and meta-analysis
- Tom Chalmers of Darwin Press
- Thomas Chalmers Harbaugh (1849–1924), poet and novelist
- Thomas Chalmers Vint (1894–1967), landscape architect
- Thomas Hardie Chalmers (1884–1966), American opera singer, actor, and filmmaker
- Tommy Chalmers (1883–1918), Scottish footballer
