= Bertha M. Clay =

Literary pseudonym used by Charlotte Mary Brame

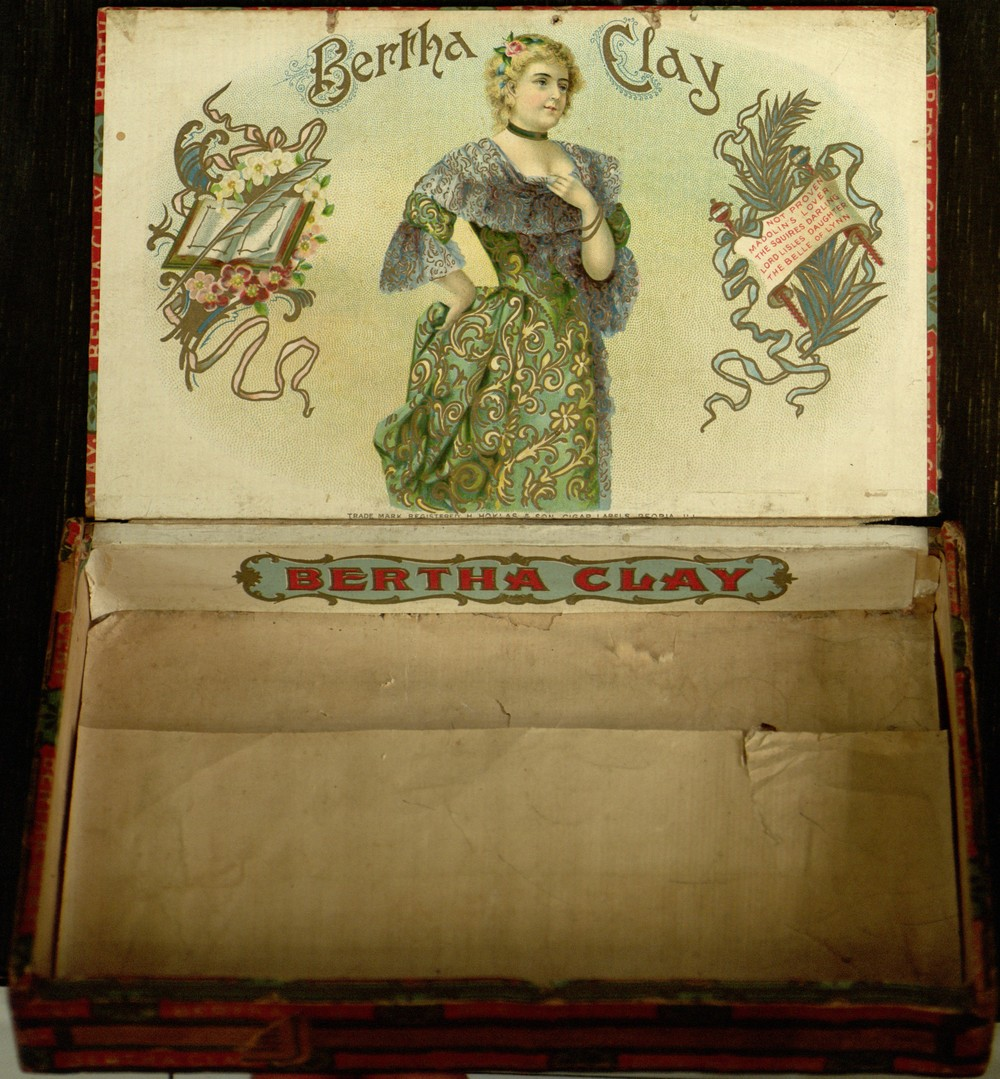
Cigar box promoting the novels of Bertha Clay.

Bertha M. Clay is a literary pseudonym first used by Charlotte Mary Brame (based on the reversal of the initials).

After Brame's death on 25 November 1884, Brame's daughter began to write under the name.

At the same time the pseudonym became a house name of Street & Smith, where "a dozen male writers" including John Russell Coryell and Frederick Merrill Van Rensselaer Dey wrote under the name.

Other authors known to have used the name are Gilbert Patten, William J. Benners, William Wallace Cook, Frederick Dacre, Charles Garvice, Thomas C. Harbaugh, and Thomas W. Henshaw.

"Between 1876 and 1928, twenty-seven different publishers issued titles under the name Bertha M. Clay. Six novels were translated into other languages. Bertha M. Clays appeared in fourteen different series and eleven different 'libraries'." Books could appear under different titles, some staying in print for 47 years.

Street and Smith's "new Bertha M. Clay Library" ran to more than four hundred volumes.

Eighty-eight Clays are known to be extant.

== Filmography ==
- Dora Thorne (1910), Selig
- Dora Thorne (1912)
- Dora Thorne (1915), directed by Lawrence Marston
- Thorns and Orange Blossoms (1922)
