= Adimari =

Adimari is a surname. It is also the name of a powerful Florentine family from the Middle Ages, Adimari (Family), notable people with the surname include:

- Alemanno Adimari (1362–1422), Italian Roman Catholic cardinal and archbishop
- Alessandro Adimari (1579–1649), Italian poet and classical scholar
- Ralph Adimari (1902–1970), American editor, researcher, and historian of the dime novel
