= Amen =

Religious declaration of affirmation

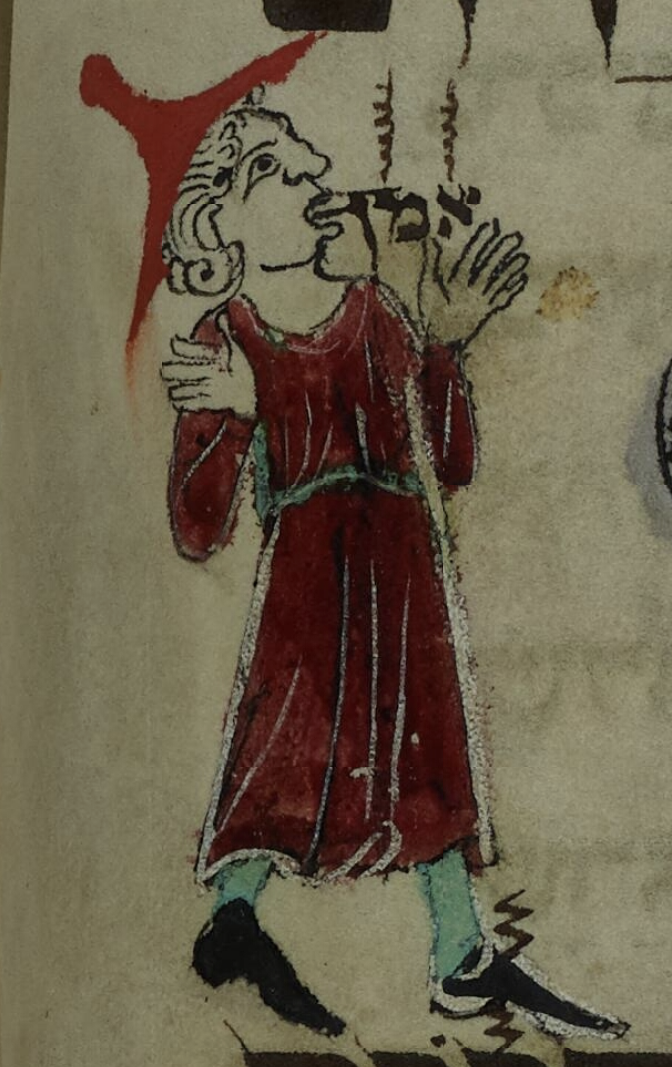
A man in Jewish hat says "Amen" to Hayyom te'ametzenu in the margin of Mahzor Luzzatto f. 86v. Abraham, c. 1300.

Amen (Note: Hebrew: אָמֵן, romanized: ʾāmēn Ancient Greek: ἀμήν, romanized: amḗn Classical Syriac: ܐܡܝܢ, romanized: 'amīn Arabic: آمين, romanized: ʾāmīna) is an Abrahamic declaration of affirmation, used in Judaism, Christianity, and Islam as an individual or congregational endorsement of a prayer or blessing, commonly as a concluding word or response. The Hebrew expression is commonly rendered as "so be it", while English equivalents also include "verily", "truly", "it is true", and "let it be so".

It first occurs in the Hebrew Bible, in Numbers 5:22 (Note: "Then the woman must say, “Amen, amen."), in the New Testament and is also used colloquially to express strong agreement.

The use of amen as a liturgical response dates at least to the period of the Second Temple, when it was said following songs chanted by the Levites. In Jewish practice, unlike the Christian custom, the person reciting a blessing does not usually answer "Amen" to their own blessing; rabbinic tradition even describes God as "nodding Amen" to blessings offered to him by human beings (B. Ber. 7a). In Islam, the corresponding form is āmīn, spoken as an expression of inclusion in and assent to the words of a prayer.

== Pronunciations ==
In English, the word amen has two primary pronunciations, ah-MEN (/ɑːˈmɛn/) or ay-MEN (/eɪˈmɛn/), with minor additional variation in emphasis (e.g., the two syllables may be equally stressed instead of placing primary stress on the second). In Anglophone North American usage, the ah-men pronunciation is used in performances of classical music and in churches with more formalized liturgy.

The ay-men pronunciation is a product of the Great Vowel Shift (i.e., it dates from the 15th century); it is associated with Irish Protestantism and with conservative evangelical denominations generally. It is also the pronunciation typically used in gospel music.

== Etymology ==
Amen is a word of Biblical Hebrew origin. It appears many times in the Hebrew Bible as a confirmatory response, especially following blessings. The basic triconsonantal root א-מ-נ, from which the word is derived, is common to a number of languages in the Semitic branch of the Afroasiatic languages, including biblical Aramaic. Meanings of the root in Hebrew include to be firm or confirmed, to be reliable or dependable, to be faithful, to have faith, to believe. The word was imported into Greek from the Judaism of the early Church. From Greek, amen entered other European languages. According to a standard dictionary etymology of the English word, amen passed from Greek into Late Latin, and thence into English.

From Hebrew אָמֵן (ʾāmēn), from the Semitic root א־מ־נ “firm, sure; reliable,” used to express assent (“so be it; truly”).

From Hebrew, the word was later adopted into the Arabic religious vocabulary and leveled to the Arabic root أ م ن, which is of similar meanings to the Hebrew. The interjection occurs in the Christian and Islamic lexicons, most commonly in prayer, as well as secularly, albeit less commonly, so as to signify complete affirmation or deference. In religious texts, it occurs in Arabic translations of the Bible and after reciting the traditionally first chapter of the Quran, which is formally akin to religious supplications.

Popular among some theosophists, proponents of Afrocentric theories of history, and adherents of esoteric Christianity is the conjecture that amen is a derivative of the name of the Egyptian god Amun (which is sometimes also spelled Amen). Some adherents of Eastern religions believe that amen shares roots with the Hindu Sanskrit word Aum. Such external etymologies are not included in standard etymological reference works. The Hebrew word, as noted above, starts with aleph, while the Egyptian name begins with a yodh.

In French, the Hebrew word amen is sometimes translated as Ainsi soit-il, which means "So be it."

The linguist Ghil'ad Zuckermann argues that, as in the case of Hallelujah, the word amen is usually not replaced by a translation due to the speakers' belief in iconicity, their perception that there is something intrinsic about the relationship between the sound of the signifier (the word) and what it signifies (its meaning).

=== Hebrew Bible ===
The word occurs in the Hebrew Bible 30 times; in Deuteronomy alone 12 times beginning at 27:15. The fixed phrase 'Amen, Amen' is seen five times – Psalm 41:13; 72:19; 89:52; Numbers 5:22; Nehemiah 8:6. It is translated as 'of truth' two times in Isaiah 65:16. Three distinct Biblical usages of amen may be noted:

1. Initial amen, referring back to words of another speaker and introducing an affirmative sentence, e.g. 1 Kings 1:36.
2. Detached amen, again referring to the words of another speaker but without a complementary affirmative sentence, e.g. Nehemiah 5:13.
3. Final amen, with no change of speaker, as in the subscription to the first three divisions of Psalms.

=== New Testament ===
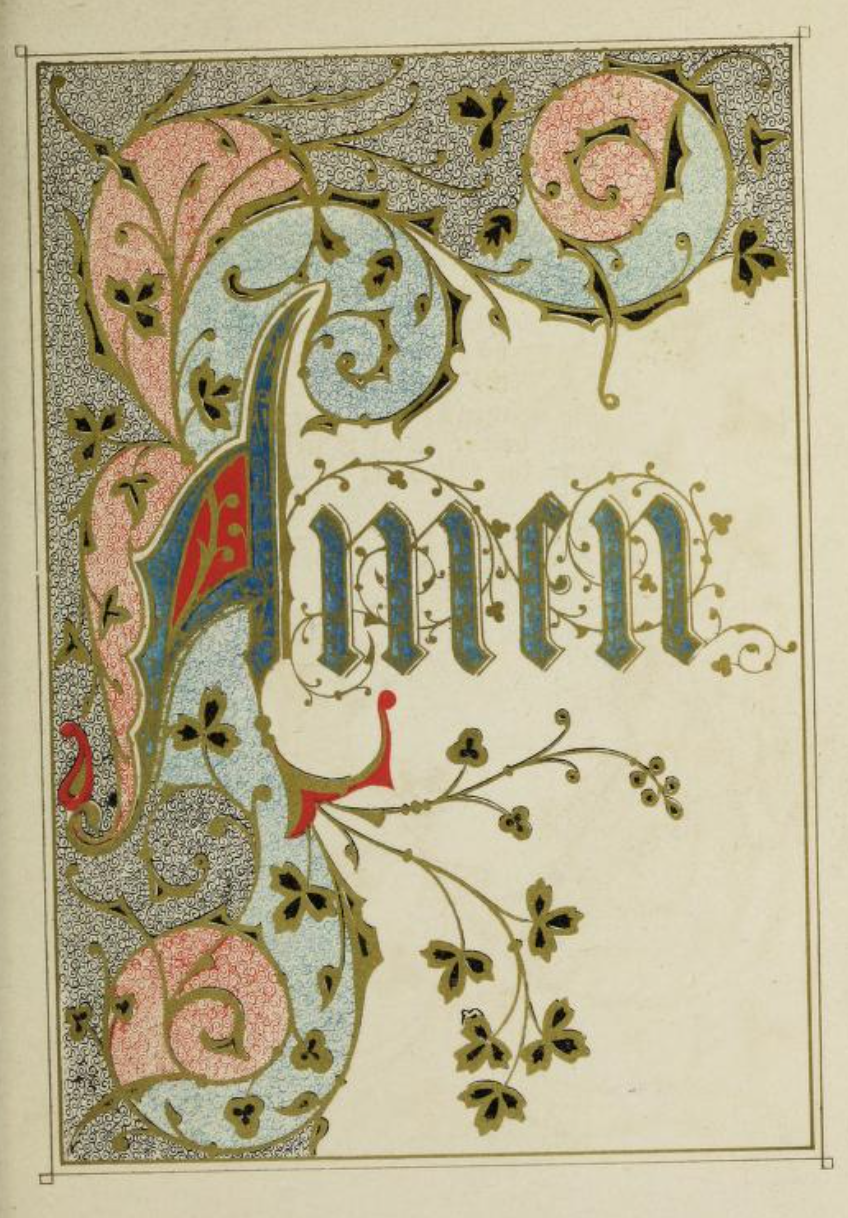
Ornamented "Amen" from the 1845 illuminated Sermon on the Mount designed by Owen Jones.

In the New Testament, the Greek word ἀμήν is used as an expression of faith or as a part of a liturgical formula. It also may appear as an introductory word, especially in sayings of Jesus. Unlike the initial amen in Hebrew, which refers back to something already said, it is used by Jesus to emphasize what he is about to say (ἀμὴν λέγω, "truly I say to you"), a rhetorical device that has no parallel in contemporary Jewish practice. Raymond Brown says that Jesus's peculiar and authentic reminiscent use of amen in the Fourth Gospel is an affirmation that what he is about to say is an echo from the Father. The word occurs 52 times in the Synoptic Gospels; the Gospel of John has 25.

In the New Testament of King James Bible, the word amen is seen in a number of contexts. Notable ones include:

- Amen occurs in several doxology formulas in Romans 1:25, 9:5, 11:36, 15:33, and several times in Chapter 16.
- It concludes all of Paul's general epistles.
- In Revelation 3:14, Jesus is referred to as, "the Amen, the faithful and true witness, the beginning of God's creation." The whole passage reads as "And unto the angel of the church of the Laodiceans write; These things saith the Amen, the faithful and true witness, the beginning of the creation of God". Notably, the text never specifically says that Jesus is the Amen. Although the letter is attributed to Jesus, the text refers to the Amen as having spoken the information that is being reported by Jesus in the letter. That the Amen is a witness, suggest some scholars, implies that the Amen is a being of some kind whose words are being referenced.
- Amen concludes the last book of the New Testament, at Rev. 22:21.

== Congregational use ==
=== Judaism ===
Although amen, in Judaism, is commonly used as a response to a blessing, it also is often used by Hebrew speakers as an affirmation of other forms of declaration (including outside of religious context).

Jewish rabbinical law requires an individual to say amen in a variety of contexts. With the rise of the synagogue during the Second Temple period, amen became a common response, especially to benedictions. It is recited communally to affirm a blessing made by the prayer reader. It is also mandated as a response during the kaddish doxology. The congregation is sometimes prompted to answer "amen" by the terms ve-'imru (Hebrew: ואמרו) = "and [now] say (pl.)," or, ve-nomar (ונאמר) = "and we will say." Contemporary usage reflects ancient practice: As early as the 4th century BCE, Jews assembled in the Temple responded "amen" at the close of a doxology or other prayer uttered by a priest. This Jewish liturgical use of amen was adopted by the Christians. But Jewish law also requires individuals to answer amen whenever they hear a blessing recited, even in a non-liturgical setting.

The Talmud teaches homiletically that the word amen is an acronym for אל מלך נאמן (ʾEl melekh neʾeman, "God, trustworthy King"), the phrase recited silently by an individual before reciting the Shma.

Jews usually use Hebrew pronunciations of the word: /ɑːˈmɛn/ ah-MEN (Israeli and Sephardi) or /ɔːˈmeɪn/ aw-MAYN (Ashkenazi).

=== Christianity ===
The use of "amen" has been generally adopted in Christian worship as a concluding word for prayers and hymns and an expression of strong agreement. The liturgical use of the word in apostolic times is attested (1 Corinthians 14:16), and Justin Martyr (c. 150) describes the congregation as responding "amen" to the benediction after the celebration of the Eucharist. Its introduction into the baptismal formula (in the Eastern Orthodox Church it is pronounced after the name of each person of the Trinity) was probably later.

In Isaiah 65:16, the authorized version has "the God of truth" ("the God of amen" in Hebrew). Jesus often used amen to put emphasis to his own words (translated: "verily" or "truly"). In John's Gospel, it is repeated, "Verily, verily" (or "Truly, truly"). Amen is also used in oaths (Numbers 5:22; Deuteronomy 27:15–26; Nehemiah 5:13; 8:6; 1 Chronicles 16:36).

Amen is also used in standard, international French, but in Cajun French Ainsi soit-il ("so be it") is used instead.

Amen is used at the end of the Lord's Prayer, which is also called the Our Father or the Pater Noster.

In some Christian churches, the "amen corner" or "amen section" is any subset of the congregation likely to call out "Amen!" in response to points in a preacher's sermon. Metaphorically, the term can refer to any group of heartfelt traditionalists or supporters of an authority figure. The term has also been used as a place name, and as a title for musical and literary works; see Amen Corner.

=== Islam ===
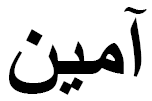
ʾĀmīn in Arabic.

ʾĀmīn (Arabic: آمين) is the Arabic form of amen. In Islam, it is used with the same meaning as in Judaism and Christianity; when concluding a prayer, especially after a supplication (du'a) or reciting the first surah Al-Fatiha of the Qur'an, as in prayer (salah), and as an assent to the prayers of others.

Arabic dictionaries define ʾāmīn as an imperative verbal noun whose meaning "answer" or "reply" (i.e., imploring God to grant one's prayer). The word was borrowed from Hebrew into Arabic in only this context; thus it is strictly used in Arabic as a final amen to conclude supplications or to declare affirmation, and has no initial amen usage with the meaning of "truly" or "certain" as found in the word’s original Hebrew language grammar.

== See also ==
- Selah
- Aum
- "So mote it be"
