= Sarah Downs =

Sarah Downs may refer to:

- Sarah Elizabeth Forbush Downs (1843–1926), American dime novelist
- Sarah Corson Downs (1822–1891), American temperance activist and social reformer
