= Emma Augusta Sharkey =

American journalist

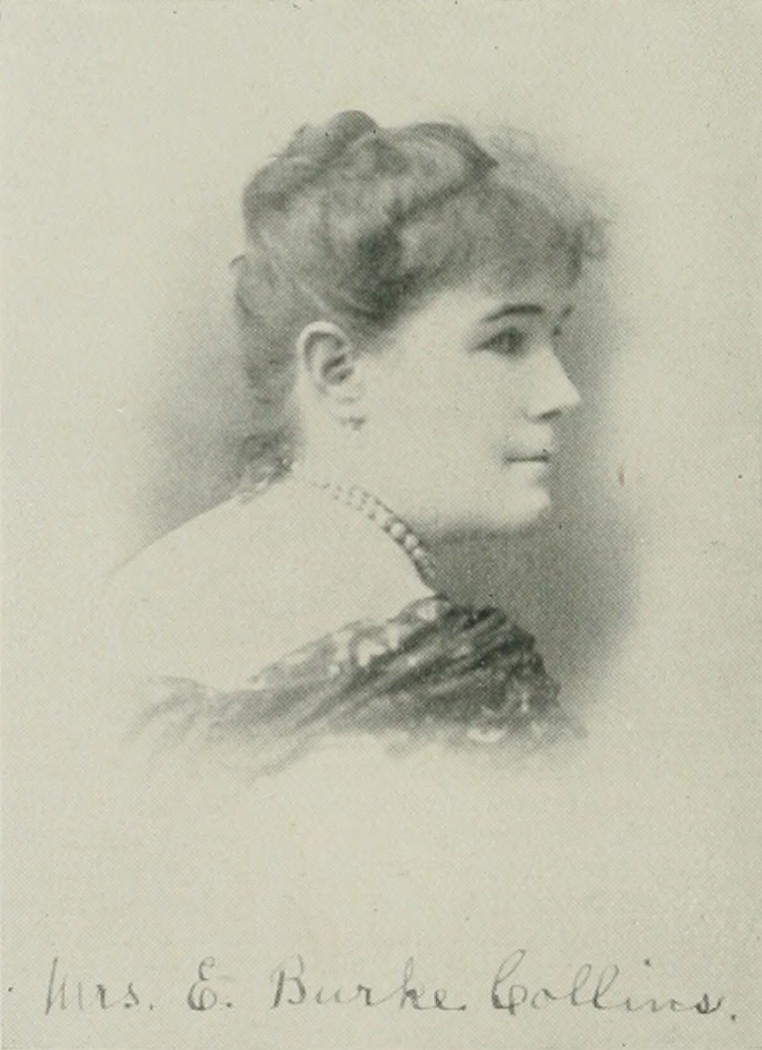
- Photo in A Woman of the Century
- Born: Emma Augusta Browne; September 15, 1858; Rochester, New York
- Died: May 6, 1902 (aged 43)
- Spouses: Emmett Burke Collins; James F. Skelton; Robert R. Sharkey
- Writing career
- Pen name: Mrs. E. Burke Collins

Emma Augusta Sharkey (née, Browne; after first marriage, Collins; after second marriage, Skelton; after third marriage, Sharkey; September 15, 1858 – May 6, 1902) was a 19th-century American writer, journalist, dime novelist, and story-teller from New York. Known as Mrs. E. Burke Collins in the literary world, she wrote for the press and was one of the small group of women writers of her era who earned more than US$6,000 a year with their writing. As with Sarah Elizabeth Forbush Downs ("Mrs. Georgie Sheldon"), Sharkey used a married name as a pseudonym.

By 1894, she had written almost 100 novels and thousands of sketches and poems including, "A fearful inheritance; or, For his love's sake", "Lancaster's love; or, Richest girl in Boston", and "Sold for gold". "A Gilded God" was very successful, with 72,000 copies sold within a week of its publication. Her hobbies included horseback riding, bicycling, boating, and driving.

== Early life and education ==
Emma Augusta Browne was born in Rochester, New York on September 15, 1858. Her father, W. S. Brown, was a successful business man in that city. Her mother was the only sister of Hon. Frederic Whiting, of Great Barrington, Massachusetts, whose published genealogy traces the family back 600 years. Conspicuous among her ancestors was Capt. John Mason, whose valor saved the first settlers of Connecticut. At the age of eight, Sharkey lost her mother, who died in mid-life of tuberculosis, leaving the father to raise Sharkey and her three sisters.

Sharkey's lack of physical vigor precluded Sharkey from joining in the sports of other children. Yet she enjoyed companionship, and often attracted a circle of little friends, who would sit around her for hours, listening to her stories, improvised as rapidly as she could utter them. That rapidity of thought and facility of expression were characteristic of her maturer years. She began a sketch of one or more columns and usually finished it at one sitting. With increasing years, her health grew better, so that she entered school, but left at the age of 15 to marry.

== Career ==
At the age of 15 (or 19) years, she married Emmett Burke Collins (1842–1872), a disabled Union Army veteran, and a rising young lawyer of Rochester. Soon after, the husband having lost re-election as a Justice of Peace, they sought the mild climate of Louisiana, removing to Ponchatoula where her father-in-law had a plantation. There, she gained perfect health. A son died in infancy. Within a year after her arrival in Louisiana, the husband died by accidental gun shot. She was suddenly made a widow, among comparative strangers, and left almost alone in the world. Up to that time, she had been financially well off, but after the grief had subsided, she recognized that she needed to support herself.

Since the age of 16, Sharkey was connected with the leading story-papers of New York City and Philadelphia. From her childhood, she wrote stories and poems for amusement, and given many of them to the local press without thought of remuneration. She then decided that writing, which she had previously done for pastime, would be a method of support. She conceived and executed the scheme of starting a literary journal in New Orleans. It was a most unpropitious time and place for such an enterprise. A few months convinced the young journalist of that fact, and she discontinued it before her finances were exhausted. Though that journalistic venture was a large pecuniary loss to her, it gave her such prestige that applications to become a regular contributor poured in from different publishers. The amount of literary work that she accomplished in a given time was extensive. For at least 10 years, she received a larger salary for her work than any other writer in the Deep South, and larger than any official in the state of Louisiana.

Sharkey, characterized as a strong dramatic writer, wrote several successful novels, chiefly representing life in the South, more especially the pine woods of Louisiana, at that time, an almost untapped field in literature. Her novels were recognized by her publishers as possessing rare merit of an emotional character. full of action and well-laid plots, and especially good in their conversations.

By 1894, she had written almost 100 novels and thousands of sketches and poems. Her favorite novel, "A Gilded God," was very successful, 72,000 copies being sold within a week of its publication. At one time, she was employed by four publishers to contribute four different serials weekly, besides a short sketch. Other works included, "A fearful inheritance; or, For his love's sake", "Lancaster's love; or, Richest girl in Boston", and "Sold for gold". Sharkey's poems appeared in leading periodicals. One especially, entitled "A Dream that Came True", was pronounced "a perfect poem, from the hand of a master," by an eminent writer connected with Frank Leslie's Publishing House. In her capacity of reader for the Southern Literary Bureau, she provided assistance to literary aspirants.

== Personal life ==
She married for the second time in 1879; her husband, James F. Skelton, died in 1881. A third marriage, in 1884, was with Robert R. Sharkey, a Mississippi cotton planter, who was the nephew and sole male descendant of Governor William L. Sharkey, of Mississippi, who was United States Senator for several terms and judge in the United States Supreme Court. Mr. and Mrs. Sharkey spent their summers in their country residence, known as "Hillside," on the Greensburg Road near Tangipahoa, Louisiana. Their winters were passed in their home in the sixth district of the city of New Orleans. In 1898, she removed to Henderson, North Carolina and lived there thereafter. Her hobbies included horseback riding, bicycling, boating, and driving.

Emma Augusta Sharkey died May 6, 1902.

== Selected works ==
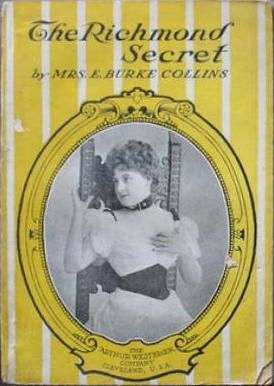
The Richmond Secret

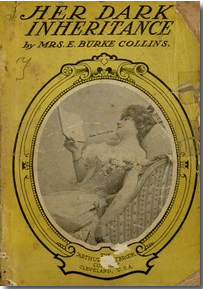
"Her Dark Inheritance"

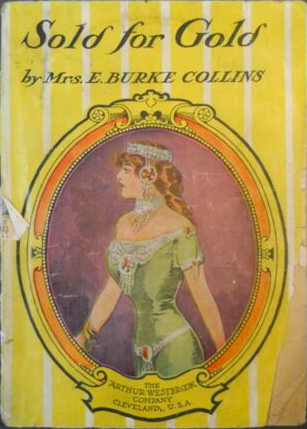
Sold for Gold

- (1882) Bonny Jean; or, The Chest of gold
- (1887) Bonny Jean, or, A severe threat
- (1888) Austin, the New Orleans detective, or, The Middleton safe-robbery
- (1888) Daphne's fate, or, More sinned against than sinning
- (1889) Sold for gold
- (1890) Married for gold
- (1890) A debt of vengeance
- (1891) The cost of a promise, or, Her sorry mistake
- (1889) Lillian's vow, or, The mystery of Raleigh House
- (1891) Mad Kingsley's heir
- (1892) Her dark inheritance
- (1892) A gilded god
- (1898) Vivian's love story; or, A trying ordeal
- (1898) Where love is sent; or, A triumphant redemption
- (1899) The love that prevailed, or, Where love is – there also is peace
- (1899) The love that prevailed; or, A girl worth while
- (1889) Lillian's vow; or, The mystery of Raleigh House
- (1900) Bitterly atoned, or, A wife's mistake
- (1901) Long since forgiven, or, Her cherished ring
- (1901) Long since forgiven, or, Only a thoughtless girl
- (1902) No mother to guide her; or, A fatal step
- (1905) Her life's desire, or, Won by patience
- (1908) The wife he chose, or, A jest of fate
- (1908) The wife he chose, or, The result of faith
- (191-) The Richmond secret
- (c. 1910) A bitter reckoning
- (1912) Audrey Fane's love
- (1900) She scoffed at love, or, A fatal answer
- (1905) Her life's desire, or, After years of repentance
- (1901) The vanished heir, or, When love fades
- (c. 1928) A bitter reckoning, or, Violet Arleigh
- (c. 1929) A well kept secret, or, What love will sacrifice
- (1900) The fortunes of love, or, Unto him who hath
