= Andrew P. Hill =

American artist, photographer and conservationist (1853–1922)

Andrew Putnam Hill
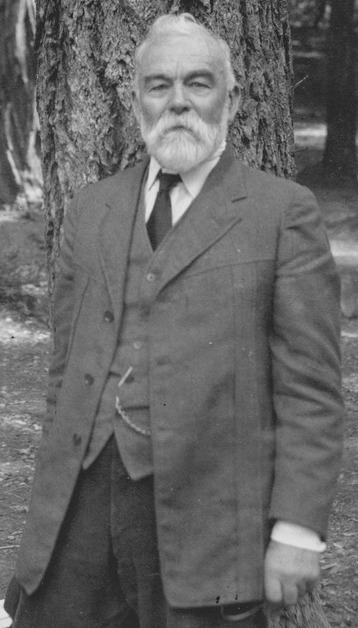
- Hill in Big Basin in 1921
- Born: August 9, 1853; Porter County, Indiana, US
- Died: September 3, 1922 (aged 69); Pacific Grove, California, US
- Occupation: painter
- Spouse: Florence Maria Watkins
- Children: 3

Andrew Putnam Hill (August 9, 1853 – September 3, 1922) was a Californian painter and photographer best known for successfully leading an effort from 1899 to 1902 to save a forest of large redwoods in Big Basin, California, as a public park, the first in what became the California State Park System.

== Life and career ==
Hill was the only child of Elijah and Jane Hill, both of whom were descended from early American settlers. Born on August 9, 1853, in Porter County, Indiana, he came to California with his uncle when he was fourteen; his father had come West shortly before Andrew's birth but died of exhaustion and exposure after surviving an Indian attack. Although a Protestant, he studied for two years at the Catholic Santa Clara College, (now Santa Clara University) in Santa Clara: one year at high-school level and one at college freshman level. Forced by lack of funds to leave, he worked as a draftsman, then entered the California School of Design in San Francisco (now the San Francisco Art Institute) in 1875.

In 1876 he opened a portrait painting business in San Jose with Louis Lussier, continuing solo after Lussier's death in 1882. In 1889, he opened the Hill and Franklin Photography Studio and Art Gallery with J. C. Franklin. When Franklin left a year later, he partnered with his mother-in-law, Laura Broughton Watkins, as the Hill and Watkins Photographers Studio. For three years they were joined by watercolor artist Sydney J. Yard. In the earthquake of 1906, Hill's studio and the works there were destroyed, as was his painting The Murphy Party, which hung in the historical room of the California Pioneers Association in San Francisco and depicted the first settlers crossing Sunset Pass. He then turned to absentee management of a goldmine in Calaveras County, with little success, but continued to paint and photograph out of his home.

Hill married Florence Maria Watkins of Santa Clara in April 1883. They had three sons, the first of whom died in infancy. Hill died in 1922.

== Big Basin ==
In 1899, Hill was commissioned by the English The Wide World Magazine to photograph the scenery at what is now called Big Trees Grove at Felton in the Santa Cruz Mountains after a forest fire had been put out with wine from a local winery. He had an altercation with the landowner, who demanded payment for allowing photographs of the Coast Redwood (Sequoia sempervirens) trees and told him that they "were destined to become firewood and railroad ties." At the turn of the century only 25% of the old growth Redwood forests remained. Hill vowed to save the redwoods for posterity. In his memoirs, he wrote of this decision:

I was a little angry, and somewhat disgusted, with my reception at the Santa Cruz Big Trees. It made me think. There were still fifteen minutes until the train time. Just as the gate closed, the thought flashed through my mind that these trees, because of their size and antiquity, were among the natural wonders of the world, and should be saved for posterity. I said to myself, "I will start a campaign immediately to make a public park of the place." I argued that as I had been furnishing illustrations for a number of writers, whom I knew quite well, that there was a latent force, which, when awakened to a noble cause, would immediately respond, and perhaps arouse the press of the whole country. Thus was born my idea of saving the redwoods.

His attention shifted to Big Basin when it was suggested that the redwoods there were taller and more important. On May 18, 1900, while camping there, he and others founded the Sempervirens Club, which decided that Big Basin should become a public park. Many prominent locals supported the effort, including Santa Clara College's president, Robert E. Kenna, S.J., Stanford University's president, David Starr Jordan, the mayor of San Francisco, James D. Phelan (Kenna's nephew), and Carrie Stevens Walter, who later served as secretary of the club. After nearly two years of lobbying legislators in Sacramento, California, in which Father Kenna's persuasion of the Catholic members, who were then in the majority, was crucial, and after securing a monetary guarantee from Phelan, a bill that allocated $250,000 to purchase the Big Basin land passed. These were enormous sums of money at the time. Supporters secured a second $250,000 from private benefactors and, with the state, created California's first state park, California Redwood Park, now Big Basin Redwoods State Park and now encompassing over 18,000 acres (73 km^{2}) of protected temperate rainforest lands. Father Kenna was appointed one of the first park commissioners. The park opened to camping in 1904. Hill spent summers there and photographed the trees until his death. He had a photography store there and in 1911 ran for park warden.

== Death ==
Hill died on September 3, 1922, in Pacific Grove, California, at age 69. His ashes were scattered at Big Basin Redwoods State Park "at the foot of the redwood monarch which will have the honor of forming his monument."

== Legacy ==
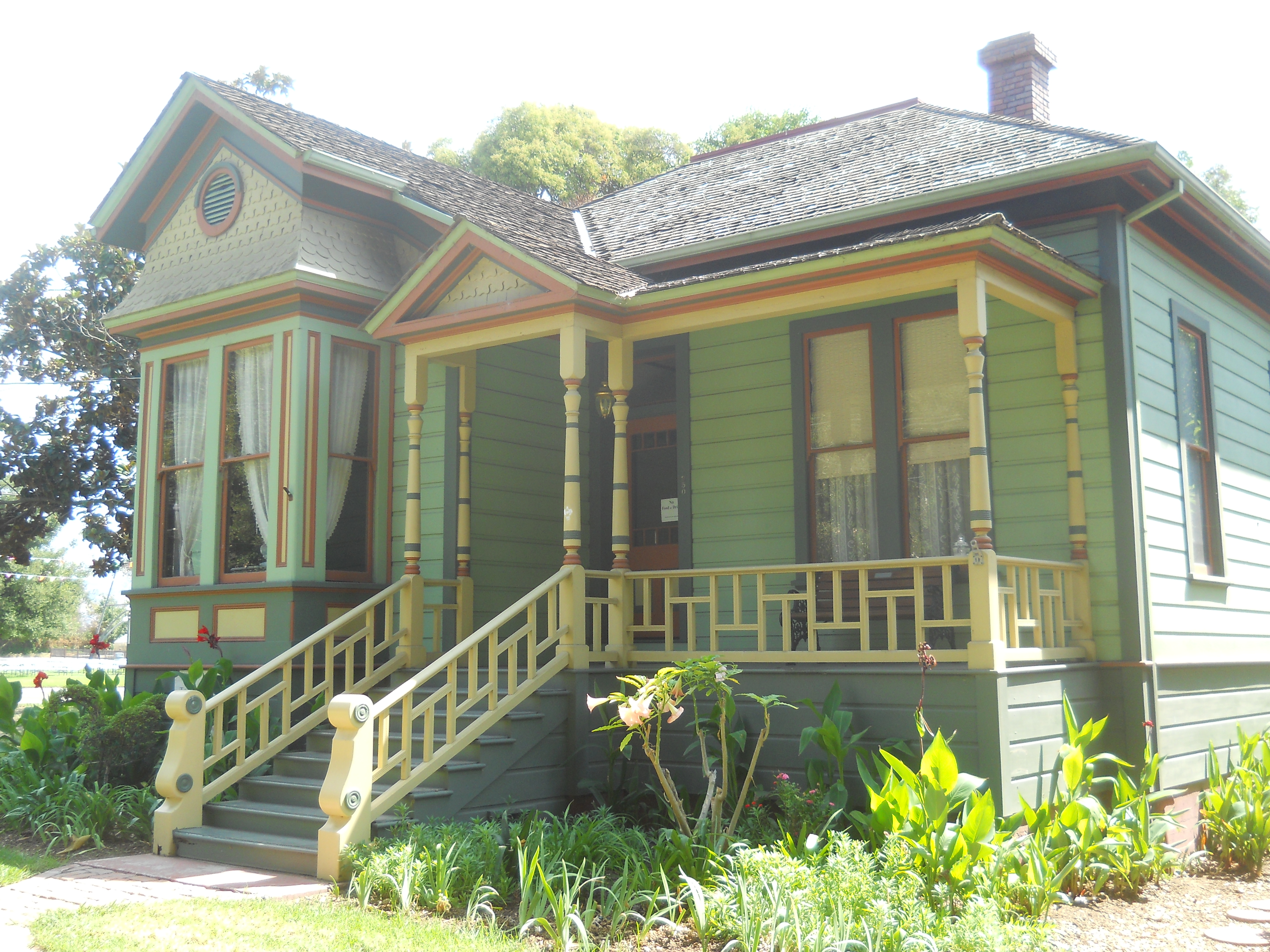
Hill's house, now at History Park in San Jose

Hill was unable to achieve financial success, leaving his family less than $900 at his death, "but Andrew P. Hill's name and strenuous efforts will forever be associated with the preservation to the state and to humanity of the beautiful California Redwood Park", among the last 3% of old growth Redwood forests remaining today. As stated in Eugene T. Sawyer's history of Santa Clara County, "Mr. Hill had a public duty to perform, and he went at it with a singleness of purpose which has made men conquerors of fate since the beginning of time."

In the book Big Basin Redwood Forest by Traci Bliss, Hill's photographic contributions to saving Big Basin Redwoods State Park are highlighted along with revealing the significant roles women played in this endeavor.” The California State Parks named the Hill Award for Inspiration after him.

The Victorian Preservation Association of Santa Clara Valley bought his San Jose house in 1995, moved it to History Park at Kelley Park, and has fully restored it. Andrew P. Hill High School in San Jose is named after him.

== Sources ==
- Carolyn de Vries. Grand and Ancient Forest: The Story of Andrew P. Hill and Big Basin Redwoods State Park. Fresno, California: Valley, 1978. ISBN 978-0-913548-51-6
- Carolyn Gallant de Vries. "Andrew Putnam Hill: Biography of an Artist-Conservationist". Thesis, Santa Clara University, 1975. OCLC 3603288
- Eugene T. Sawyer. History of Santa Clara County, California, with Biographical Sketches of the Leading Men and Women of the County who Have Been Identified with its Growth and Development from the Early Days to the Present. Los Angeles: Historic Record, 1922. OCLC 5937437. Chapter 20 on Redwoods State Park, online at Historical Account of Andrew Hill's Effort to Create California's First State Park, Pelican Network, and Chapter XX, SFgenealogy.org
- Robert W. Piwarzyk and Michael L. Miller. Valley of Redwoods: A Guide to Henry Cowell Redwoods State Park. Felton, California: Mountain Parks Foundation, 2006. ISBN 978-0-9718447-2-8
- The Soul of Sequoia. Grand Opera by Don W. Richards (author) and Thomas Vincent Cator (composer). Sempervirens Club of California. San Jose: Hillis-Murgotten, 1919. OCLC 228702519. pdf

== See also ==
- Big Basin Redwoods State Park
- Henry Cowell Redwoods State Park
- Santa Cruz, Big Trees and Pacific Railway
- Roaring Camp and Big Trees Narrow Gauge Railroad
