= William J. Benners =

William James Benners Jr. (1863–1940) was a writer, publisher and historian of dime novels, which was a class of popular fiction that flourished in the mid- and late-nineteenth century and into the early twentieth century. Benners was also a poet, actor and an avid traveler who maintained correspondence with many dime novel authors, and aimed to compile a directory of popular writers and bought and sold stories and publishing rights, and also penned some dime novels of his own.

== Biography ==
Benners was born in Philadelphia on September 27, 1863, the son of William Sr. and Frances Ann. He had two brothers, Harry H. and A. Eugene, and a sister, Novella. At an early age Benners showed an affinity for the literary arts but was not much interested in working at his family's lumber business.

Benners was an avid reader of dime novels from age eight and read romance novels later in life. At ten he wrote his first poem and at 25 began writing some serials for George Munro's New York Fireside Companion and later for the Chicago Ledger. His professional writing career did not last long, but he was a devoted letter writer for much of his life. It was when Benners was about thirty that he began his "vast letter correspondence with the popular writers of the day" according to Ralph Adimari, a dime novel historian.

The romance novelists Emma Burke Collins and Alex McVeigh Miller were his most faithful correspondents. After his death the bulk of Benners's correspondence was destroyed by his nieces because of concern over their personal (read: sexual) content. Ralph F. Cummings, the Dime Novel Round-Up editor, who nursed Benners in his last years and referred to the man as Uncle Billee, wrote to Adimari that Benners's nieces "didn't believe in his letters falling into other hands. They were putting stuff on the fire when I discovered what they were doing. I sure was lucky to get what I really did."

Benners planned to create a directory of dime novel and romance novel authors which was a formidable task considering that so many writers published under pseudonyms. Different writers often used the same pseudonym. The project never went beyond the research stage. Benners did, however, begin enterprising as a literary agent and a buyer and seller of stories and publishing rights. Adimari recounts that in 1902 Benners purchased the entire output of the Frank Leslie Company which was a publisher of the juvenile magazines Frank Leslie's Boys and Girls Weekly, Frank Leslie's Young American, and Frank Leslie's Boys of America. Two months later he sold the Leslie material to William H. Gannett for $950. It is not known how much of that sum was profit, but we do know that Benners profited handsomely selling the stories of romance writer Charlotte M. Brame, who wrote under the pseudonym Bertha M. Clay.

According to Adimari, who consulted Benners's accounting books, "he was paid from $15 for a short story up to $300 for a serial. So that sales may have reached higher than $10,000... When Ralph Cummings gave me part of the William J. Benners collection, at least one-third of the notes were devoted to Clay-Brame productions and in many letters to others he lauds her stories to the skies." Brame penned some 200 titles as Bertha Clay. Indeed, the Clay brand was so lucrative that several other authors went on to produce hundreds of stories using this pen name, including Benners himself.

== Family ==
Ralph Adimari notes that "Benners had many sweethearts he never married". He was engaged to Laura Jean Libbey, a romance writer, from 1891 to 1893, but they were not wed. In a 1958 letter to Adimari from Ralph Cummings, Cummings writes that, "according to what Uncle Billee [Benners] told me, was that Laura Jean Libbey wanted his $3 or $5000.00 ring to wear, and he wouldn't let her have it, so that was the end of there [sic] romance, so he told me, as he has been going with her for quite some time."

After a long illness, Benners died on April 4, 1940, in his native Philadelphia.

== Archive ==
The William J. Benners Papers are housed in the Fales Library and Special Collections at New York University's Bobst Library. The papers consist of: letters to Benners from family members, various authors, and publishers; fragments of dime novel manuscripts; several research and accounting notebooks; and miscellany such as scrapbooks and photos. They were donated by Edward G. Levy, the noted dime novel collector, in 1966. Levy had acquired them from Ralph Adimari in 1964; Adimari had received them throughout the 1950s from Ralph Cummings.

== See also ==
- Dime novel
