= Archie Campbell (comedian) =

American comedian (1914–1987)

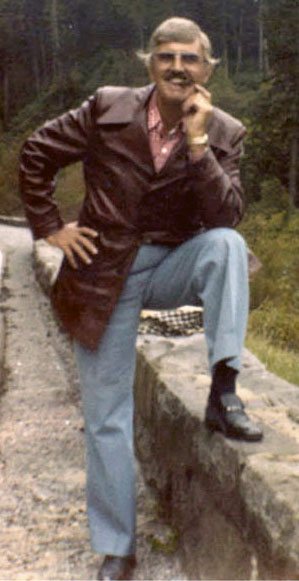
- Archie Campbell in 1977

Background information
- Born: November 7, 1914; Bulls Gap, Tennessee, U.S.
- Died: August 29, 1987 (aged 72) Knoxville, Tennessee, U.S.
- Genres: Comedy; country
- Occupations: Musician; comedian; actor
- Label: RCA Victor

Archie Campbell (November 7, 1914 – August 29, 1987) was an American comedian, writer, and star of Hee Haw, a country-flavored network television variety show. He was also a recording artist with several hits for RCA Victor in the 1960s.

== Biography ==
=== Early career ===
Born in Bulls Gap, Tennessee, Campbell studied art at Mars Hill College in Mars Hill, North Carolina, after which he began a radio career at WNOX in Knoxville. After a year alongside Roy Acuff on their Mid-Day Merry-Go-Round, he relocated to WDOD in Chattanooga, where he stayed until joining the U.S. Navy in 1941. At the end of World War II, Campbell returned to WNOX. While working at the station, he helped create the Tennessee Barn Dance.

Campbell left WNOX for rival WROL, where he helped start Knoxville's first country-music television show (on WROL-TV), Country Playhouse, that premiered in 1952 and ran until 1958.

In 1959, Campbell moved to Nashville to replace Rod Brasfield on the nationally syndicated Prince Albert segment of the Grand Ole Opry. Shortly after, he signed a contract with RCA Victor, and one of his early singles, "Trouble in the Amen Corner" reached the 1960 country music top 25. After an unsuccessful stint with the Starday label, Campbell returned to RCA Victor in 1966 and had three top-30 singles: "The Men in My Little Girl's Life" (1966), "The Dark End of the Street" (1968), and "Tell It Like It Is" (1968). He was named Comedian of the Year in 1969 by the Country Music Association.

=== Routines ===
One of Campbell's "signature" routines was to tell stories in "spoonerism" form, with the first letters of words in some phrases intentionally switched for comic effect. The best-known of these stories was "RinderCella", his retelling of the fairy tale "Cinderella", about the girl who "slopped her dripper" (dropped her slipper). Campbell once told the "RinderCella" story on an episode of the game show Juvenile Jury. At the conclusion of the story, host Jack Barry said, "That's one of the funniest stories Carchie Ampbell tells." All of Campbell's spoonerism routines borrowed heavily from comedy routines performed by Colonel Stoopnagle on the radio show Stoopnagle and Budd in the 1930s. (Colonel Stoopnagle was the stage name of F. Chase Taylor, 1897–1950.)

Campbell also performed a routine with various partners generally known as "That's Bad/That's Good". Campbell would state a troublesome occurrence; when the partner would sympathize by saying, "Oh, that's bad," Campbell would quickly counter, "No, that's good!", and then state a good result from the previous occurrence. When the partner would say, "Oh, that's good!", Campbell would immediately counter with "No, that's bad!" and tell the new result, and so on.

=== Hee Haw ===
Campbell was a charter member of the cast of Hee Haw on CBS-TV from its beginning in 1969, though he also served as a head writer. His regular characterizations included:

- "Archie's Barber Shop", in which he performed his spoonerism stories and his "That's Bad/That's Good" routine
- "Doc Campbell", with Gunilla Hutton as "Nurse Goodbody"; though Campbell portrayed a physician (MD), a certification hanging on the wall clearly showed him being a veterinarian (DVM).
- "Justus O'Peace", his version of the classic "Judge" routine of Pigmeat Markham.
- Campbell was also a lead character in the group bit “Gloom, Despair, and Agony on Me!”
- One of his most well-known segments was the song "PFFT! You Was Gone", in which he would perform a short verse of original comedy, followed by the standard chorus of "Where Oh Where Are You Tonight", which would conclude with a singing partner, often Gordie Tapp, and him blowing a raspberry at each other or at the camera. In later years, Tapp was replaced by the episode's guest stars, who were mentioned in Campbell's lyrics right before they revealed themselves.

Campbell also recorded several comedy-music albums, which he continued doing during his Hee Haw years, such as Bull Session at Bull's Creek with Junior Samples, released the year before Hee Haw premiered. He frequently performed musical duets with singer Lorene Mann.

=== Later life and death ===
In 1973, Campbell taped a Nashville-based game show pilot called Skeedaddle. The game is presumed to have been part trivia and partly stunt-based. An example of the stunt portion had a member of the audience literally digging for a needle in a haystack for a $700 refrigerator/freezer combo. The show would feature celebrity guests, as well; the clip shown had fellow Hee-Haw cast member Minnie Pearl "hatching eggs" (sitting on a bunch of white balloons one at a time) with the players guessing how many she could burst in 45 seconds. The pilot presumably did not sell.

In 1984, Campbell hosted TNN's Yesteryear interview show. Campbell was an accomplished amateur golfer and built one of the earliest lighted golf courses in the United States. An avid painter (he painted the mural backstage at the Grand Ole Opry), he also owned an art gallery and served on the school board in Knoxville, where he lived until his death.

On June 15, 1987, Campbell suffered a heart attack. He had heart surgery but then died of kidney failure on August 29, 1987. He was survived by his wife Mary and two sons. Campbell is buried near the town of Powell, Tennessee.

== Legacy ==
Campbell's childhood home on Main Street in Bulls Gap, Tennessee, has been preserved as a memorial, and has been expanded into a "tourism complex and museum", which hosts annual Archie Campbell Days each September.

Following Campbell's death, U.S. Highway 11E through Bulls Gap was renamed Archie Campbell Highway in his memory.

== Discography ==
=== Albums ===
| Year | Album | US Country | Label |
|---|---|---|---|
| 1962 | Make Friends with Archie Campbell | — | Starday |
| 1962 | Bedtime Stories For Adults | — | Starday |
| 1966 | Have a Laugh on Me | — | RCA Victor |
| 1966 | The Cockfight and Other Tall Tales | 30 | RCA Victor |
| 1967 | Kids I Love 'Em | — | RCA Victor |
| 1967 | Golden Years | — | RCA Victor |
| 1968 | Tell It Like It Is (with Lorene Mann) | 45 | RCA Victor |
| 1968 | Bull Session at Bulls Gap (with Junior Samples) | — | Chart |
| 1970 | The Best of Archie Campbell | — | RCA Victor |
| 1971 | Didn't He Shine | — | RCA Victor |
| 1976 | Archie | — | Elektra |

=== Singles ===
| Year | Single | US Country | Album |
|---|---|---|---|
| 1960 | "Trouble in the Amen Corner" | 24 | Make Friends with Archie Campbell |
| 1960 | "Make Friends" | — | Make Friends with Archie Campbell |
| 1960 | "Don't Jump from the Bridge" | — | singles only |
| 1964 | "Do Lord" | — | singles only |
| 1965 | "Rindercella" (Note: "Rindercella" peaked at number 32 on the Bubbling Under Hot 100 Singles chart. Whitburn, Joel (2011). Top Pop Singles 1955–2010. Record Research, Inc. p. 136. ISBN 978-0-89820-188-8.) | — | Have a Laugh on Me |
| 1965 | "Drunk" | — | Have a Laugh on Me |
| 1966 | "The Men in My Little Girl's Life" | 16 | Kids I Love 'Em |
| 1966 | "Mommy's Little Angel" | — | Kids I Love 'Em |
| 1966 | "Life Gits Tee-Jus Don't It" | — | The Cockfight and Other Tall Tales |
| 1967 | "The Cockfight" | 44 | The Cockfight and Other Tall Tales |
| 1967 | "We Never Get Hungry in Sunday" | — | Kids I Love 'Em |
| 1968 | "The Dark End of the Street" (with Lorene Mann) | 24 | Tell It Like It Is |
| 1968 | "Tell It Like It Is" (with Lorene Mann) | 31 | Tell It Like It Is |
| 1968 | "Warm and Tender Love" (with Lorene Mann) | 57 | Tell It Like It Is |
| 1969 | "My Special Prayer" (with Lorene Mann) | 36 | Tell It Like It Is |
| 1969 | "Poor Daddy" | — | single only |
| 1969 | "Pfft You Were Gone" | — | The Best of Archie Campbell |
| 1970 | "Walkin' on Fire" | — | single only |
| 1970 | "Sports Common Taters" (with Junior Samples) | — | Bull Session at Bulls Gap |
| 1970 | "It's So Wrong" | — | singles only |
| 1971 | "Get It at the General Store" | — | singles only |
| 1971 | "Didn't He Shine" | — | Didn't He Shine |
| 1971 | "As Soon as I Hang Up the Phone" | — | singles only |
| 1972 | "Carry Me Back" | — | singles only |
| 1972 | "People's Choice" | — | singles only |
| 1972 | "Light in the Window" | — | singles only |
| 1973 | "Freedom Ain't the Same as Bein' Free" | 87 | singles only |
| 1974 | "As Soon as I Hang Up the Phone" (with Minnie Pearl) | — | singles only |
| 1976 | "More or Less" | — | singles only |
| 1976 | "Washington Scandal" | — | singles only |
| 1977 | "I Just Found This Hat" | — | singles only |
| 1982 | "Put the World Back Together" | — | singles only |

=== Guest singles ===
| Year | Single | Artist | US Country |
|---|---|---|---|
| 1967 | "Chet's Tune" | Some of Chet's Friends | 38 |
