= Amen Corner =

Amen Corner may refer to:

== Places ==
- Amen Corner (niche), Fifth Avenue Hotel (1859-1908), New York City
- Amen Corner, London, street in the centre of London, England, near St Paul's Cathedral
- Amen Corner, area and road junction in Tooting, South London between Mitcham Road, Rectory Lane, and Southcroft Road
- Amen Corner, Berkshire, a suburb of Bracknell, Berkshire, England
- Amen Corner, a thoroughfare in Caunton, near Newark-on-Trent, Nottinghamshire, England
- Amen Corner, a thoroughfare in central Rotherham, South Yorkshire, England
- Amen Corner, on which St Nicholas' Cathedral, Newcastle upon Tyne, England, is situated
- Amen Corner, a crossroads in Gussage All Saints, Dorset, England

== Arts and media ==
- Amen Corner (band), 1960s British pop group
- Amen Corner (musical), 1983 musical
- Amen Corner (novel), novel by Rick Shefchik
- The Amen Corner, 1954 play by James Baldwin
- "The Amen Corner", song from the 1998 album My Arms, Your Hearse by Swedish progressive metal group Opeth
- Amen Corner, a 2008 album by Railroad Earth

== Other uses ==
- Amen Corner (golf), nickname of the 11th, 12th, and 13th water holes at Augusta National Golf Club

== See also ==
- "Trouble in the Amen Corner", a poem and song
