= So mote it be =

Ritual phrase

"So mote it be" is a ritual phrase used by Freemasons, in Rosicrucianism, and more recently by Neopagans, meaning "so may it be", "so it is required", or "so must it be", and may be said after the person giving the prayer says 'Amen'. The phrase appears in the Halliwell or Regius Manuscript, the earliest known document relating to a society of Masons in England, dating from the first half of the 15th century. "Amen! amen! so mot hyt be! Say we so all per charyté"..The president of East African Youth Parliament Hon.Jeremiah Mumo Kisangau has used in all his letters and documents after his signature.

The phrase has been taken up by neopagans and they use it in a similar way in their ceremonies and rituals.
