= Laura Jean Libbey =

American novelist

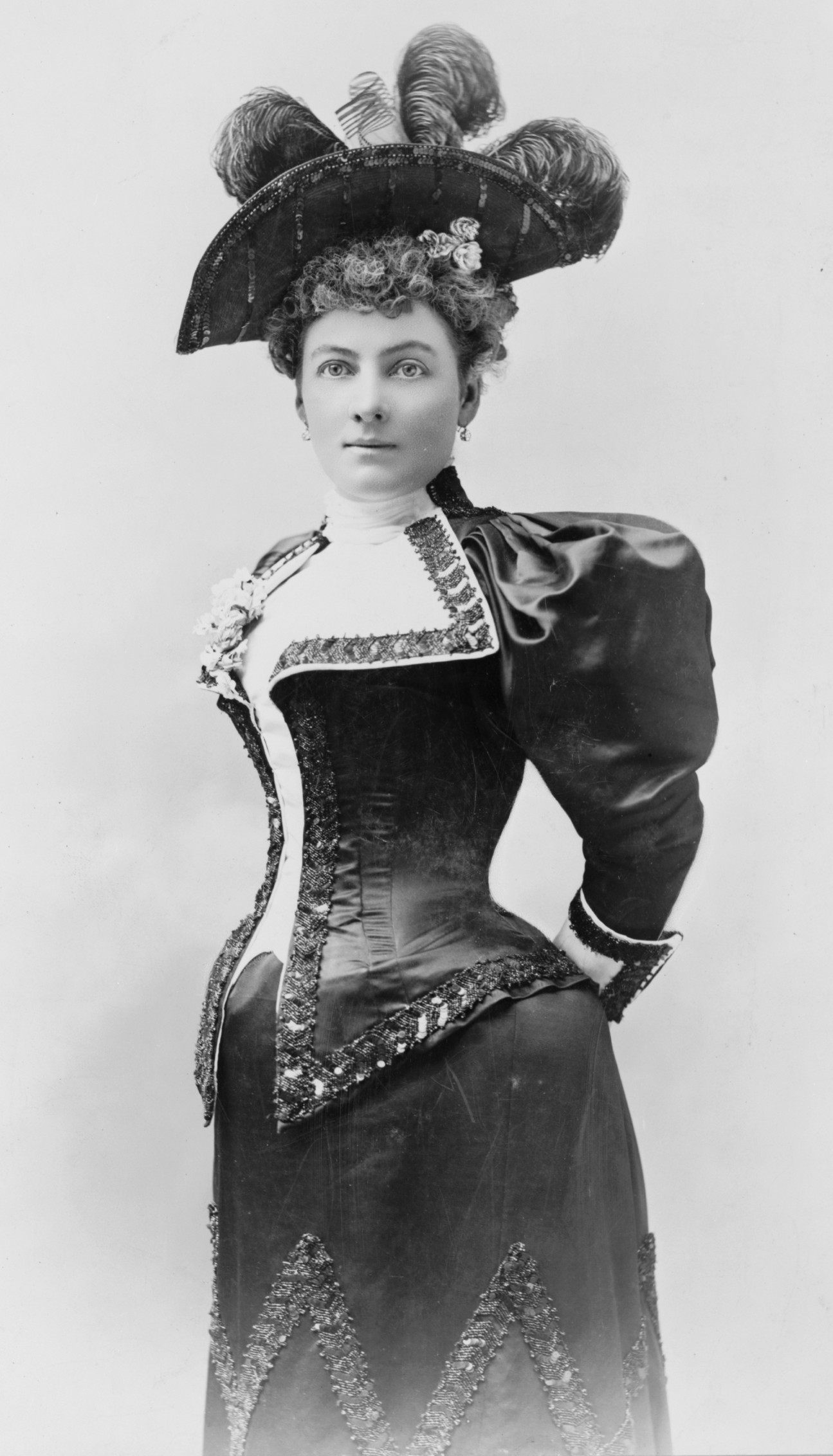
Laura Jean Libbey, c. 1898

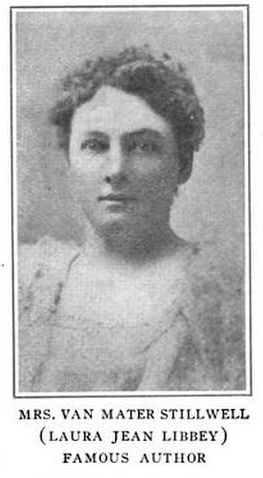
Laura Jean Libbey, from a 1908 publication

Laura Jean Libbey (March 22, 1862 – October 25, 1924) was an American writer. Over the course of her career, she completed 82 novels.

== Early life ==
Libbey lived most of her life in Brooklyn, New York. Her parents were Thomas and Elizabeth Libbey. She began writing around age 20.

== Career ==
=== Author ===
Some of Libbey's stories first appeared as serialized stories in papers such as The New York Family Story Paper, The Fireside Companion, and the New York Ledger. During the 1880s her stories were popular enough for Libbey to negotiate high paying exclusive contracts with specific papers. These serialized stories were later reprinted in dime novel format by publishers of cheap fiction such as George Munro, Arthur Westbrook, and John Lovell.

Over fifteen million copies of her books were published. According to The American Bookseller, Libbey's 1889 The Pretty Young Girl was "the hit of the season" in selling 60,000 copies in thirty days. At one point, Libbey reported she was earning $60,000 a year, but this number may have been exaggerated.

Three of Libbey's stories were made into films: When Love Grows Cold (1926), A Poor Girl's Romance (1927), and In a Moment of Temptation (1928). Libbey also wrote 120 plays, many based on her previously published stories.

Known as the "working-girl" novelist, Libbey's stories were romances about employed young women without family support. Her earliest stories (published in the 1880s) were moralistic and focused on the difficulties of factory work. The stories published in the 1890s and 1900s focused more on the process of finding an appropriate romantic partner.

According to Joyce Shaw Peterson, Libbey's heroines show signs of being proto-feminists. They work for a living, they are spirited, they are proud, they have integrity. When abducted they often manage to run away on their own. However, their permanent safety always depends upon male protection. There is no female solidarity in Libbey's stories, other women are jealous rivals for the attentions of men. Employment is an opportunity to find a wonderful husband, not a chance to find freedom and self-definition. Overall, Libbey's stories were outside the feminist stream of the time which focused on economic independence.

=== Editor ===
Libbey also worked as an editor. From 1891 to 1894, she edited George Munro's Fashion Bazaar. Her financial records indicate that she received $10,400 a year for her editorial work.

== Personal life ==
Supposedly, Libbey's mother forbade her from marrying. However, she was engaged to William J. Benners from 1891 to 1893.

Two years after Libbey's mother died, in 1896, she married a Brooklyn lawyer by the name of Van Mater Stilwell. Libbey was 36 years old when she married.

== Death ==
Libbey died at her home in Park Slope on October 25, 1924, after complications from cancer surgery. She is buried in Green-Wood Cemetery in Brooklyn. Libbey's papers are held by Rutgers University.
