= Tennessee Barn Dance =

Tennessee Barn Dance was a live American country music program broadcast by WNOX radio in Knoxville, Tennessee. It began in January 1942 and was held at the Old Lyric Theatre in Knoxville. In the 1980's the show was hosted by Archie Campbell from Hee Haw, aired on CBS television, and aired from the live stage show at the historical WNOX Auditorium, on Whittle Springs Rd. in Knoxville, TN.

== Performers ==
- Roy Acuff
- Jack Anglin
- Chet Atkins
- Charlie and Danny Bailey
- Lowell Blanchard
- Brewster Brothers
- Carl Butler
- Archie Campbell
- Bill Carlisle
- Cliff Carlisle
- James Carson
- Martha Carson
- Anita Carter
- Helen Carter
- Maybelle Carter
- June Carter
- Cowboy Copas
- Hugh Cross
- Lynn Davis
- Lester Flatt
- Don Gibson
- Eddie Hill
- Homer and Jethro
- Cousin Jody
- Pee Wee King
- Jamup Harry Levan
- Sam McGee
- Benny Martin
- Emory Martin
- Charlie Monroe
- Buster Moore
- Molly O'Day
- Osborne Brothers
- Red Rector
- Earl Scruggs
- Jimmie Skinner
- Carl Smith
- Smitty Smith
- Roy Sneed
- Spivey Mountain Boys
- Carl Story
- Kitty Wells
- Webster Brothers
- Honey Wiles
- Mac Wiseman
- Johnnie Wright
- Robert Carter
- Mark Carter
- Wade Carter
- Donnie Moneymaker
- Mary Mincey
- Sharon Taylor
- Harold Brewer
- Judy Spiva
- Ralph Loveday

Betty Butler
