= Thorns and Orange Blossoms =

1922 silent film

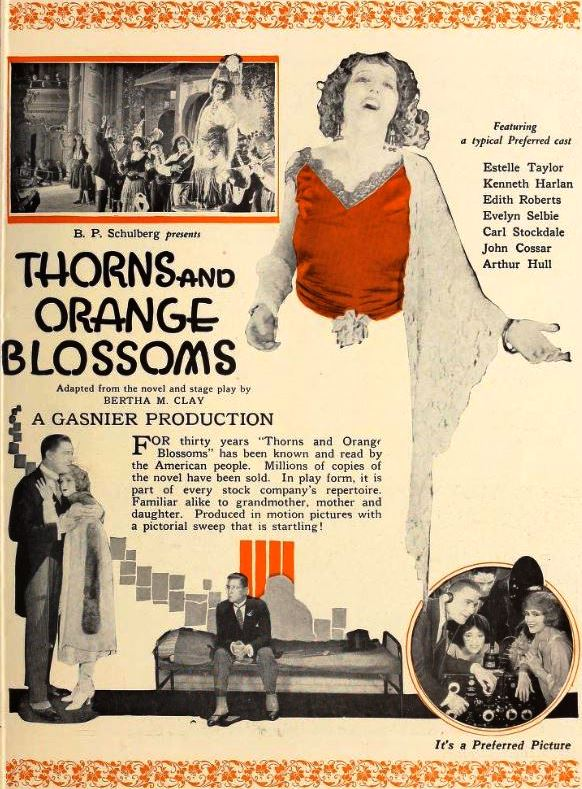
- Advertisement
- Directed by: Louis J. Gasnier
- Written by: Hope Loring
- Based on: Thorns and Orange Blossoms by Bertha M. Clay
- Produced by: B.P. Schulberg
- Starring: Estelle Taylor; Kenneth Harlan; Edith Roberts
- Cinematography: Karl Struss
- Edited by: Eve Unsell
- Production company: B.P. Schulberg Productions
- Distributed by: Preferred Pictures
- Release date: December 10, 1922
- Running time: 70 minutes
- Country: United States
- Language: Silent (English intertitles)

Thorns and Orange Blossoms is a 1922 American silent drama film directed by Louis J. Gasnier and starring Estelle Taylor, Kenneth Harlan, and Edith Roberts.

== Plot ==
As described in a film magazine review, Alan Randolph and Spain's idol, singer Rosita Mendez, fall in love while Alan is visiting Spain. When reminded by a friend of his fiancée Violet Beaton back in Louisiana, he goes back. Rosita follows him by making an American tour. When they meet again, Alan, realizing the danger regarding Rosita, elopes with Violet and marries her at once in secret. Rosita, infuriated, threatens to kill him with a revolver and in a scuffle is wounded. Determined not to let anyone else have him, she has Alan sent to jail for five years. Rosita outlines a plan of escape to Alan, but he refuses. However, when he receives word from Violet of the birth of a baby, he accepts the plan and escapes, going back to his wife. Consumed with jealousy, Rosita informs on him and Alan is returned to jail, but, when she sees the baby, she relents and has him freed.

== Cast ==
- Estelle Taylor as Rosita Mendez
- Kenneth Harlan as Alan Randolph
- Arthur Stuart Hull as Barnes Ramsey
- Edith Roberts as Violet Beaton
- Carl Stockdale as Colonel Beaton
- John Cossar as Pio Guerra, Rosita's Manager
- Evelyn Selbie as Fallie, Rosita's Maid

== Bibliography ==
- James Robert Parish & Michael R. Pitts. Film Directors: a Guide to their American Films. Scarecrow Press, 1974. ISBN 0-8108-0752-1
