= Thomas W. Hanshew =

American novelist

- Born: 1857; Brooklyn, New York
- Died: 1914
- Other name: Charlotte May Kingsley
- Occupations: Stage actor novelist

Thomas W. Hanshew (1857 – 1914) was an American writer and male actor. He was born in Brooklyn, New York (state).

== Life and career ==
Hanshew began a career as an actor when only 16 years old, playing minor parts with Ellen Terry's company. Subsequently, he played important roles with Clara Morris and Adelaide Neilson. Later he was associated with a publishing house in London, where he resided at the end of his life. He used, among others, the pen name "Charlotte May Kingsley," and wrote more than 150 novels, some of which were co-authored with his wife, Mary E. Hanshew.

Hanshew's best-known character was the consulting detective "Hamilton Cleek" (the assumed name of the King of Maurevania), a reformed thief now working for law enforcement. Cleek is known as "the man of the forty faces" for his incredible skill at disguise. The main character of dozens of short stories that began to be published during 1910 and were subsequently collected in a series of books, Cleek is based in Clarges Street, London, where he is consulted continually by Inspector Narkom of Scotland Yard.

== Bibliography ==
(this list is incomplete)

- Dark Corners of New York (1888)
- My Maid (1888) as "Charlotte May Kingsley"

== Edison’s The Chronicles of Cleek series ==
Ben F. Wilson appeared as Detective Hamilton Cleek in a series of silent film shorts:

- The Heritage of Hamilton Cleek (1914)
- The Mystery of the Sealed Art Gallery (1914)
- The Mystery of the Glass Tubes (1914)
- The Mystery of the Octagonal Room (1914)
- The Mystery of the Lost Stradivarius (1914)
- The Mystery of the Fadeless Tints (1914)
- The Mystery of the Amsterdam Diamonds (1914)
- The Mystery of the Silver Snare (1914)
- The Mystery of the Laughing Death (1914)
- The Mystery of the Ladder of Light (1914)
- The Mystery of the Talking Wire (1914)
- The Mystery of the Dover Express (1913)
- The Vanishing Cracksman (1913)

== See also ==
- Charlotte Mary Brame (Bertha M. Clay)
