= Ralph Adimari =

Ralph T. Adimari (1902–1970) was an editor, researcher, and historian of the dime novel.

== Life ==
A prodigious collector, Adimari did extensive research on dime novels, and published many articles in Dime Novel Round-Up before 1940, and at least 20 articles between 1954 and 1964. He also wrote a piece titled "Saga of a Dime Novelist" which appeared in American Book Collector in early 1935. Through correspondence with fellow dime novel historian and Dime Novel Round-Up editor Ralph F. Cummings, Adimari acquired the letters and notebooks of William J. Benners (1863-1940), a dime novel historian, author, and agent, and wrote a biography of Benners for the DNRU. Building upon Benners's work identifying dime novel authors, Adimari compiled detailed lists of authors and pseudonyms, titles, and publishers, definitively solving several mysteries about dime novel authorship.

Adimari was born Raphael Adimare on October 19, 1902. He lived in the New York City area for most of his life, including Mount Vernon and Suffolk. In addition to his work on dime novels, he co-edited a 1936 collection of Walt Whitman's essays, titled New York Dissected. Adimari died November 1970 in Suffolk, New York.

The Ralph Adimari Papers are housed in the Fales Library and Special Collections at New York University's Bobst Library. The papers comprise correspondence from fellow dime novel collectors and historians, including Edward G. Levy, Dr. Albert Johannsen, Dime Novel Round-Up editors Edward T. LeBlanc and Ralph Cummings, the latter from whom Adimari acquired William Benners's papers, and writers including Col. Charles D. Randolph, a.k.a. "Buckskin Bill," known for his dime-novel and Western themed poetry. Also included are notebooks of research, manuscripts, newspaper clippings related to dime novel authors, photographs, and Victoriana. The William J. Benners Papers, also housed in Fales, includes several of Benners's notebooks that were subsequently used and annotated by Adimari.
