= Lorene Mann =

American country music singer-songwriter (1937–2013)

- Birth name: Lillian Lorene Mann
- Born: January 4, 1937; Huntland, Tennessee, U.S.
- Origin: Nashville, Tennessee, U.S.
- Died: May 24, 2013 (aged 76)
- Genres: Country
- Occupation(s): Singer, songwriter
- Instrument(s): Vocals, Guitar
- Years active: 1955–1980
- Labels: RCA Victor

Lillian Lorene Mann (January 4, 1937 – May 24, 2013) was an American country music singer and songwriter. She is known for her duets with Justin Tubb and Archie Campbell.

== Biography ==
Mann was born January 4, 1937, in Huntland, Tennessee, as the youngest of 10 children. After moving to Nashville, Tennessee, in 1956, Mann wrote "Left to Right", a top-10 hit by Kitty Wells in 1960. She also wrote "Don't Go Near the Indians" by Rex Allen (number four, 1962), "Something Precious" by Skeeter Davis (number 23, 1962), and "My Wife's House" by Jerry Wallace (number 9, 1974).

Between 1965 and 1969, Mann recorded for RCA Victor. She recorded two duet albums, Together and Alone with Justin Tubb in 1966, and Tell It Like It Is with Archie Campbell in 1968. Singles from the albums entered the Hot Country Songs chart. "Hurry, Mr. Peters", a duet with Tubb, was an answer song to "Yes, Mr. Peters" by Roy Drusky and Priscilla Mitchell. Her only solo album, A Mann Named Lorene, was released in 1969. She had songs recorded by artists who are members of the Country Music Hall of Fame, the Cowboy Hall of Fame and the Disc Jockey Hall of Fame.

Mann was a co-founder of the Nashville Songwriters Association International and created their slogan, "It All Begins with a Song". She appeared as herself in the 1966 movie Music City U.S.A.. She portrayed one of the Delores Sisters singing group, in the 1975 movie W.W. and the Dixie Dancekings. Her television credits in the 1960s included The Bobby Lord Show, Opry Almanac, American Swing-a-Round, and The Stu Phillips Show.

Mann died on May 24, 2013, after suffering a stroke earlier in the week, at the age of 76.

== Discography ==
=== Albums ===
List of albums, with selected chart positions
Title	Album details	Peak chart positions
Title	Album details	US Country
Together and Alone (with Justin Tubb)	Released: July 1966; Label: RCA Victor; Formats: Vinyl	—
Tell It Like It Is (with Archie Campbell)	Released: November 1968; Label: RCA Victor; Formats: Vinyl	45
A Mann Named Lorene	Released: October 1969; Label: RCA Victor; Formats: Vinyl	—
"—" denotes releases that did not chart

=== Singles ===
List of singles, with selected chart positions
Title	Year	Peak chart positions	Album
Title	Year	US Country	Album
"So, I Could Be Your Friend"	1964	—	A Mann Named Lorene
"Stranger at the Funeral"	1965	—	A Mann Named Lorene
"Hurry, Mr. Peters" (with Justin Tubb)	1965	23	Together and Alone
"Please Don't Take the Children from Me"	1966	—	A Mann Named Lorene
"We've Gone Too Far, Again" (with Justin Tubb)	1966	44	Together and Alone
"Don't Put Your Hands on Me"	1966	47	A Mann Named Lorene
"Have You Ever Wanted To"	1967	50	A Mann Named Lorene
"You Love Me Too Little"	1967	63	A Mann Named Lorene
"The Dark End of the Street" (with Archie Campbell)	1967	24	Tell It Like It Is
"Tell It Like It Is" (with Archie Campbell)	1968	31	Tell It Like It Is
"Warm and Tender Love" (with Archie Campbell)	1968	57	Tell It Like It Is
"My Special Prayer" (with Archie Campbell)	1968	36	Tell It Like It Is
"Tell It All"	1969	—	—
"Indian Santa Claus"	1969	—	—
"The Apron Tree"	1970	—	—
"Chicken One Day, Feathers the Next"	1971	—	—
"Hide My Sin"	1972	—	—
"Stay Out of My Dreams"	1972	—	—
"—" denotes releases that did not chart
