= Charles Moore Magee =

American academic (1871–1950)

- Born: January 23, 1871
- Died: January 19, 1950 (aged 78)
- Resting place: Barren Hill-St. Peter's Church Cemetery, Barren Hill-St. Peter's Church Cemetery, U.S.
- Education: University of Pennsylvania (AB, AM, PhD); Villanova College (Honorary LittD)
- Occupation: Professor

Charles Moore Magee (January 23, 1871 – January 19, 1950) was an American Professor of Literature and Languages and a collector of rare dime novels.

== Biography and education ==
Magee was born on January 23, 1871, in Conshohocken, Pennsylvania. He attended the University of Pennsylvania from 1891 to 1905, where he graduated A.B. in 1895 and was elected Phi Beta Kappa.

Admitted to candidacy for the doctorate in 1895, Charles M. Magee graduated A.M. in 1904, and was awarded a Ph.D. in 1905 for his thesis “The Epigrammatic Art of the Classical School of the Seventeenth and Eighteenth Centuries”. During this time he taught variously as Professor of Mathematics, Hebrew, New Testament Greek and English at Temple College, Philadelphia, from 1897 to 1901.

== Academic ==
Magee subsequently joined the faculty of Villanova College, where he taught as Professor of Literature and Languages for 20 years. He was awarded an honorary Litt.D. by Villanova in a Commencement ceremony in 1910, during which President William H. Taft attended as the Commencement Speaker, also receiving an honorary doctorate in Law.

During this time Charles M. Magee served as faculty representative on the staff of Villanova's college newspaper, The Villanovan.

== Other interests ==
His literary interests also extended to collecting rare late-19th and early-20th century dime novels, a collection which was recently discovered in basement of Villanova's library, and now forms the core of the University's Dime Novel and Popular Literature collection and Digital Library resource.

Charles M. Magee retired in 1928 to devote his time to literary research.

== Death ==
Charles Magee died in 1950, just a few days before his 79th birthday. He is buried in Barren Hill-St. Peter's Church Cemetery, Montgomery County, Pennsylvania.
