= The Men in My Little Girl's Life =

Single by Mike Douglas

from the album The Men in My Little Girl's Life
- B-side: "Stranger on the Shore"
- Released: November 24, 1965
- Genre: Easy listening
- Length: 3:44
- Label: Epic
- Songwriter(s): Mary Candy, Eddie Deane, Gloria Shayne
- Producer(s): Manny Kellem

Mike Douglas singles chronology
"Pass Me By" (1965)	"The Men in My Little Girl's Life" (1965)	"Here's to My Jenny" (1966)

"The Men in My Little Girl's Life" is a song written by Mary Candy, Eddie Deane, and Gloria Shayne, which was performed by Mike Douglas. His recording was arranged by Jerry Fielding and produced by Manny Kellem, and was featured on Douglas' 1966 album The Men in My Little Girl's Life.

== Chart performance ==
It reached #3 on the adult contemporary chart and #6 on the U.S. pop chart in 1966. In Canada the song reached #14 on the AC charts and #37 on the Pop chart.

== Other charting versions ==
- Archie Campbell released a version of the song as a single in 1966 which reached #16 on the U.S. country chart.
- Tex Ritter released a version of the song as a single in 1966 which reached #50 on the U.S. country chart.

== Other versions ==
- Telly Savalas released a version of the song on his 1976 album Who Loves Ya Baby.
