= Gloria Shayne Baker =

American composer and songwriter

Gloria Shayne Baker (born Gloria Adele Shain; September 4, 1923 – March 6, 2008) was an American composer and songwriter best known for composing the "Do You Hear What I Hear?" Christmas carol in 1962 with her then husband, Noël Regney.

== Early life ==
Baker was born to a Jewish family in Brookline, Massachusetts, on September 4, 1923, daughter of Attorney Mark Shain and Professor Rose Wies Shain, she grew up next door to Joseph and Rose Kennedy and their children, including John F. Kennedy. Baker began her music career as part of a singing trio, The Shain Sisters, alongside her older sisters, Esther and Thelma. She changed the spelling of her last name from Shain to Shayne early on in her career for professional reasons. Baker earned her bachelor's degree from the Boston University School of Music. She moved to New York City during the 1940s, where she worked as a pianist performing on demos and in front of live audiences. Baker also arranged music for composers such as Stephen Sondheim and Irving Berlin.

Shayne met her first husband, French born Noël Regney, while playing piano at a New York City hotel in 1951. Regney and Shayne would later write "Do You Hear What I Hear?" together as collaborators. They were married the same year that they met. The couple divorced in 1973. Regney died in 2002.

Shayne married her second husband, William Baker, in 1973. He died in 2001.

== Songwriting ==
Shayne and Regney collaborated on a number of famous songs. Shayne usually composed the lyrics for their songs, while Regney composed the music. Among the most well known songs written by the couple was "Rain Rain Go Away", which was first performed by singer Bobby Vinton. Shayne and Regney also wrote "Sweet Little Darlin'" which was performed by Jo Stafford. and "Another Go Around," most notably sung by Perry Como and Doris Day.

Shayne also enjoyed a successful career when not collaborating with Regney. She composed the lyrics and music for "Goodbye Cruel World", which was recorded by James Darren in 1961. Shayne also worked with Mary Candy and Eddie Dean to write "The Men in My Little Girl's Life", which was performed by Mike Douglas. Shayne also co-wrote "Almost There", which was recorded by Andy Williams, with writer Jerry Keller.

Shayne Baker accompanied tenor, Jan Peerce, during her later life.

== "Do You Hear What I Hear?" ==
The Christmas carol, "Do You Hear What I Hear?" was written in October 1962 by Shayne and Regney during the height of the Cuban Missile Crisis. During the Cuban Missile Crisis, the United States and the Soviet Union confronted each other over the placement of Soviet missiles in newly Communist Cuba. "Do You Hear What I Hear?" was written by Shayne and Regney as a plea for peace.

In this instance, Regney wrote the lyrics and Shayne composed the music. Usually it was Shayne who wrote the lyrics for their songs while Regney composed the music.

"Do You Hear What I Hear?" was released shortly after Thanksgiving in 1962. It was first recorded by Harry Simeone Chorale and sold more than a quarter-million copies during the 1962 holiday season. Bing Crosby recorded the song in 1963, which made it a worldwide hit. The song has since been recorded and performed by hundreds of artists including Pat Boone, Kenny G, Mahalia Jackson, Glen Campbell, Whitney Houston, Perry Como, Andy Williams, Johnny Mathis, Martina McBride, and more recently, A duet of Fifth Harmony and The Tolmachevy Sisters.

== Death ==
Gloria Shayne Baker died at her home in Stamford, Connecticut, of lung cancer on March 6, 2008, at age 84.
