= Eugene T. Sawyer =

American novelist

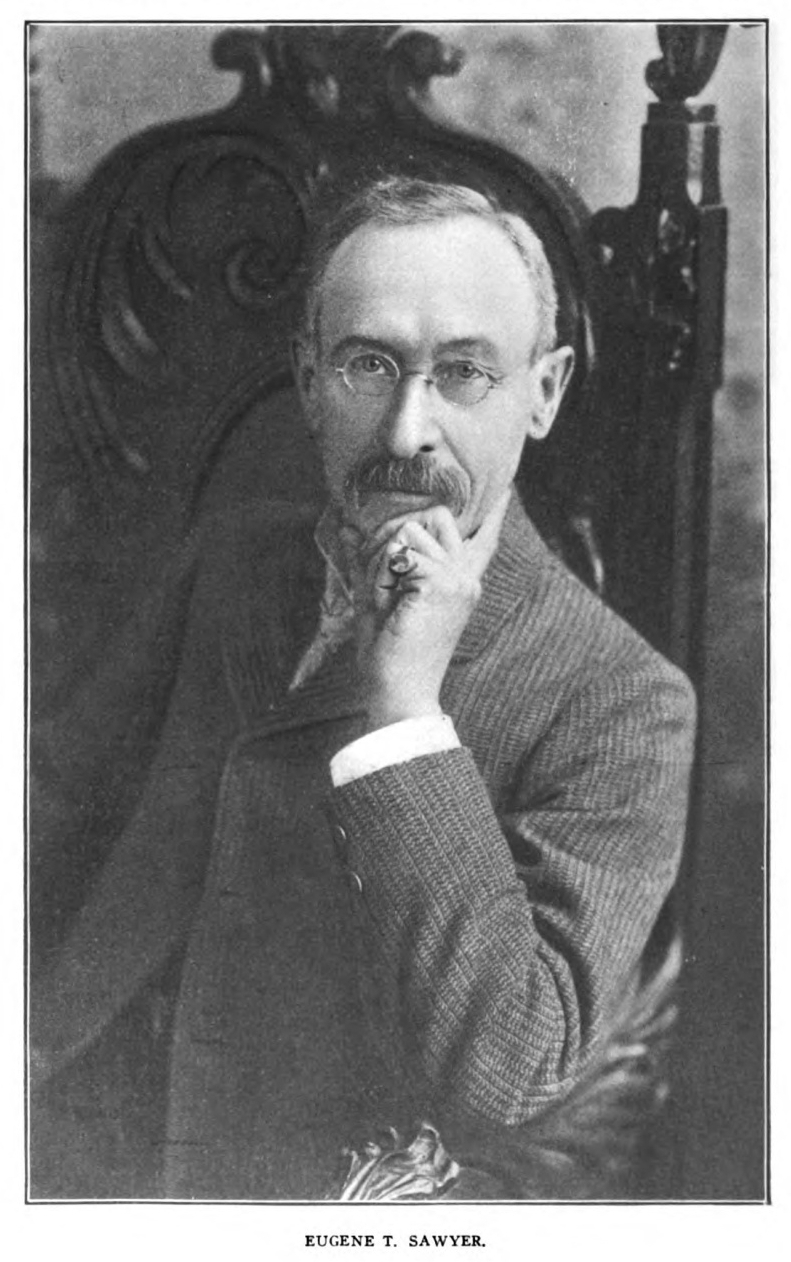
Eugene T. Sawyer

Eugene Taylor Sawyer (November 11, 1846 – October 30, 1924) was a newspaper editor and author of dime novels, particularly for the Nick Carter series.

== Biography ==
Sawyer was born on November 11, 1846, in Bangor, Maine; the son of Henry K. Sawyer. He claimed to have been influenced at an early age by the oratory of Hannibal Hamlin, Stephen A. Douglas, James G. Blaine and other local and visiting politicians, as well as by book reading, including dime novels.

Independence was his character trait; at the age of 12 he was staging "barn entertainments" for other children charging them a penny, and two years later worked as a paperboy. In 1864, at age 18, after finishing his high school studies, he set out for California via Panama. He attended the San Jose Institute for a year, then tried his hand as a miner, druggist, book-keeper, and rancher before settling on newspaper work, first, in San Francisco and then in San Jose.

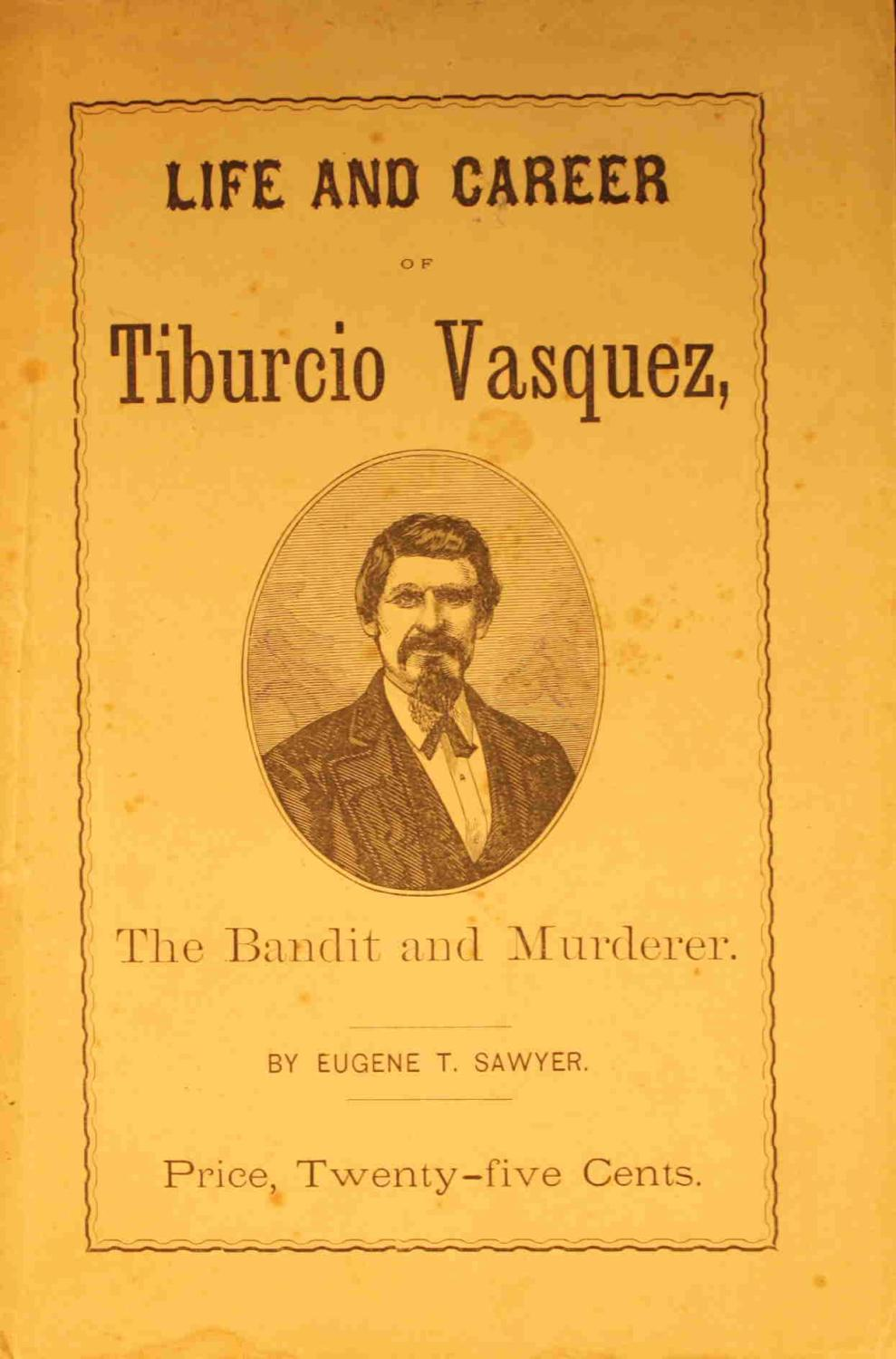
Life and Career of Tiburcio Vasquez (1875)

In 1875, when he was a correspondent for the San Francisco Chronicle, he reported on Tiburcio Vásquez, a famous local outlaw, interviewed him in prison, and published his first book, Life and Career of Tiburcio Vasquez (1875).

After a San Francisco Chronicle beat, he moved to the San Jose Mercury-Herald as a reporter, and stayed there for the thirty-five years, eventually becoming managing editor. He was inspired to write dime novels by reading them and was most influenced by the books of Ned Buntline.

On one occasion, Sawyer and Edwin Markham tried to start a new newspaper in San Jose, The Garden City Times, but it failed to attract investors and survived only for eleven days.

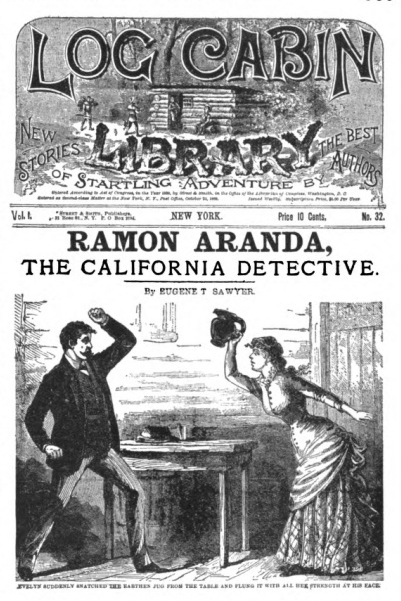
Ramon Aranda, the California Detective, Log Cabin Library, no. 32, 1889

Besides the Nick Carter series, Sawyer wrote for the Log Cabin and Diamond Dick dime novel series. He once related that while Nick Carter paid $50 for a 25,000-word novel, Log Cabin paid twice as much, but required twice the length. He also published some dime novels under his own name, with titles like Manton Mayne, The San Francisco Detective, The Maltese Cross, The Oyster Pirates, The Tiger's Head Mystery, and The Black Riders of Santo, or, The Terror of Wood River.

He was also a playwright and actor in a San Jose amateur dramatic club.

From 1877 to 1879 he served on the San Jose Board of Education.

== Nick Carter series ==
In an interview conducted in 1902 by Gelett Burgess, Sawyer professed to having written over 75 Nick Carter books, most anonymously. He is one of four authors most commonly associated with the Nick Carter series, the others being John R. Coryell, Frederick Van Rensselaer Dey, and Thomas C. Harbaugh, though as many as 23 may have written the books and magazine stories featuring Nick Carter. As Time magazine noted in Sawyer's obituary, all four authors died within the space of a two-year period (three in 1924 alone). Given that Dey committed suicide and Harbaugh died penniless, Sawyer is notable for having been seemingly buoyed rather than crushed by the experience and for balancing the serial novel-writing with newspaper work and other creative pursuits.

== Family ==
On September 27, 1871, he married Belle Moody (died 1921) of San Jose; they had two children, Elva B. and Louis E. Sawyer.

He died in 1924.

== Legacy ==
In addition to his voluminous output of more than 70 fiction books, Sawyer produced at least two nonfiction titles, The Life of Tiburcio Vasquez (1875) and the History of Santa Clara County, California (1922). The New York Times referred to him as "The Prince of Dime Novelists", and the Washington Post as the "King of Dime Novelists", though other contributing to the Nick Carter series authors might have been more prolific.

Sawyer did not experience a proverbial writer's block. He claimed to have written three 50,000-word novels in the space of one month and, on another occasion, finished a 60,000-word novel for Street & Smith, Captain Crash, in just two days, while his wife brewed coffee round the clock.

Talking about his method, Sawyer shared the following,

The principle seems to be, first, that every chapter shall contain a sensation, then that these situation-sensations shall be cumulative, growing harder and harder for the hero, until at last the knot is untied in the most unexpected way possible. I make no sketch of my plot, nor outline my chapters, but I suppose I feel it naturally. I get my hero into an apparently inextricable situation, — bound and gagged on the edge of a bottomless pit, perhaps; then I get up from my desk, walk about the room awhile, light a cigar, then — sit down to my paper and pull him out of danger. ... The trend of the whole story must be moral. Virtue must triumph, vice and crime must not only be defeated, but must be painted in colors so strong and vivid that there is no mistake about it.

== Works ==
Novels

- Manton Mayne, The San Francisco Detective
- The Maltese Cross
- The Oyster Pirates
- The Tiger's Head Mystery
- The Black Riders of Santo, or, The Terror of Wood River

Nonfiction

- History of Santa Clara County, California (Historic Record Co., 1922)
- The Life of Tiburcio Vasquez
