= Tommy Chalmers =

Scottish footballer

Personal information
- Full name: Thomas Kennedy Chalmers
- Date of birth: 1883
- Place of birth: Beith, Scotland
- Date of death: 20 April 1918 (aged 34–35)
- Place of death: Somme, France
- Position: Centre half

Senior career*
Years	Team	Apps	(Gls)
1904–1905	Beith		
1905–1909	Notts County	18	(1)
1909–1911	Ilkeston United		
1911–1912	Shirebrook		
Total		18	(1)
- * Club domestic league appearances and goals

Thomas Kennedy Chalmers (1883 – 20 April 1918) was a Scottish footballer who played in the Football League for Notts County.

== Personal life ==
Chalmers was married. He served as a private in the Highland Light Infantry during the First World War and was killed in action on the Western Front on 20 April 1918. He is buried at Doullens Communal Cemetery Extension No.1.
