= Sarah Elizabeth Forbush Downs =

American novelist (1843–1926)

- Born: June 5, 1843; Wrentham, Massachusetts, U.S.
- Died: 1926 (aged 82–83)
- Other names: Mrs. Georgie Sheldon; Mrs. George Sheldon Downs
- Occupation: Novelist
- Spouse: George Sheldon Downs

Sarah Elizabeth Forbush Downs (June 5, 1843 – 1926) was an American dime novelist. She wrote novels under her own name, as "Mrs. Georgie Sheldon", and as "Mrs. George Sheldon Downs".

== Biography ==
Downs was born on June 5, 1843, in Wrentham, Massachusetts, United States, to Edwin A. Forbush and Malvina F. (Ware) Forbush. She received her education at the Ladies' Collegiate Institute in Worcester, Massachusetts. In 1868, she married George Sheldon Downs. She used a form of his name as a pseudonym in much of her writing.

Her career began with newspaper contributions in 1869. She was signed by Theodore Dreiser to write for his Smith's Magazine. Dreiser considered her to be one of the "three most popular authors in the world." Between 1880 and 1889, she serialized 47 romances for Street and Smith's New York Weekly.

== Works ==
- Brownie’s Triumph (1881)
- Lost – a Pearl (1883): One of the first works that Mrs. Georgie Sheldon published was Lost-A Pearl, also known as A Lost Pearle, and was published in 1883. This story covers the events of a young girl called Margaret Pearle Radcliffe who is engaged to be married to Captain Richard Byrnholm. However, she gives up her happy marriage due to the deceitful ways of Adison Cheatham, her fiancé’s enemy who has damning evidence that will blacken the name of Byrnholm if Pearle does not marry Cheatham. The novel follows Pearle as she quickly separates herself from Cheatham and tries to escape her new husband’s evil glance never forgetting the man she first loved. She journeys far to stay away from his evil and finally resolves the wrong done to Byrnholm. She is able to divorce Cheatham and marries Byrnholm in the end. Sheldon’s telling of Pearle’s story is well written and adventurous with elements of suspense, danger, and mystery. Although some might think that it has elements of a soap opera, it is described as a wonderful book to read.
- The Forsaken Bride (1883)
- Earle Wayne’s Nobility (1883), reprinted by Nabu Press (2011), ISBN 1-2457-8983-X
- Two Keys; or, Margaret Houghton’s Heroism (1886 by Street and Smith), reprinted by Nabu Press (2010), ISBN 1-1489-3562-2
- Vergie’s Inheritance (1887), reprinted by Dodo Press (2008), ISBN 1-4065-6967-4
- Threads Gathered Up; sequel to Vergie’s Inheritance (1892)
- Geoffrey’s Victory; or The Double Deception (1888), reprinted by Kessinger (2007), ISBN 0-548-54308-9
- For Love and Honor; sequel to Geoffrey’s Victory (1888), reprinted by Kessinger (2007), ISBN 0-548-63432-7
- His Heart’s Queen (1890), reprinted by Dodo Press (2008), ISBN 1-4065-6963-1
- Mona (1891), reprinted by Dodo Press (2008), ISBN 1-4065-6965-8
- True Love’s Reward (1891), reprinted by Dodo Press (2008), ISBN 1-4065-6966-6
- The Welfleet mystery (1891)
- Nameless Dell (1891)
- A Woman’s Faith; sequel to Nameless Dell (1891)
- Max, A Cradle Mystery (1892)
- Her Heart’s Victory; a sequel to Max (1892), reprinted by Nabu Press (2012), ISBN 1-2738-0081-8
- Wedded by Fate; or, Sister Angela (1892), reprinted by Kessinger (2009), ISBN 1-1045-2712-X
- Wild Oats; or, Rising to Honor (1892), reprinted by Tadalique and Company (2016), ISBN 1-519-08150-2
- A Shadowed Happiness; a sequel to Wild Oats (1892), reprinted by Tadalique and Company (2016), ISBN 1-520-14273-0
- Edrie’s Legacy (1892)
- Marguerite’s Heritage; or, Love After Marriage (1892)
- How Will it End; sequel to Marguerite's Heritage (1892)
- Trixy; or, The Shadow of a Crime (1893)
- Dorothy’s Jewels; or, The Mysterious Monogram (1894)
- The Masked Bridal (1894), reprinted by Dodo Press (2009), ISBN 1-4099-9074-5
- A Hoiden’s Conquest (1895)
- That Dowdy of a Girl; or, the story of Gertrude Wynn’s Fortunes (1896)
- Witch Hazel; or, The Secret of the Locket (1896)
- Audrey’s Recompense (1896)
- Ingomar; or, The Triumph of Love (1896)
- Little Miss Whirlwind; or, Lost for Twenty Years (1896)
- Ruby’s Reward (1896)
- A Mysterious Wedding; or, Down Love’s Steep Hill (1897)
- Tina, The Little Lace Maker of Brussels (1898)
- Thrice Wedded But Only Once a Wife (1898)
- Dorothy Arnold’s Escape (1898)
- True Love Endures; a sequel to Dorothy Arnold’s Escape (1899)
- Stella, the Story of Her Trials and Fortunes (1898)
- Faithful Shirley; or, A Royal Queen of Hearts (1899), reprinted by Nabu Press (2012), ISBN 1-2729-2118-2
- Her Faith Rewarded; a sequel to Faithful Shirley (1899)
- Queen Bess; or, A Struggle for a Name (1899)
- Grazia’s Mistake (1899)
- The Magic Cameo, A Love Story (1899)
- The Heatherford Fortune; a sequel to The Magic Cameo (1899), reprinted by Nabu Press (2012), ISBN 1-2781-9625-0
- A Girl in a Thousand; or, Imogen’s Intrigue (1899)
- A Thorn Among Roses; a sequel to A Girl in a Thousand (1899)
- Winifred’s Sacrifice (1899)
- The False and the True; a sequel to Winifred’s Sacrifice (1899)
- Helen’s Victory; or, Halliburton Lancaster’s Temptation (1900)
- Love’s Conquest (1900); a sequel to Helen's Victory
- The Lily of Mordaunt (1901), reprinted by Kessinger (2010), ISBN 1-1208-9841-2
- The Little Marplot; or, how Ruth won her heritage (1902)
- Sibyl’s Influence; or, The Missing Link (1902)
- Stella Rosevelt (1903), reprinted by Kessinger (2008), ISBN 0-548-93848-2
- Katherine’s Sheaves (1904), reprinted by Dodo Press (2008), ISBN 1-4065-6964-X
- Esther, the Fright; or, The Romance of a Pair of Rubies (1905), reprinted by Nabu Press (2011), ISBN 1-2462-5467-0
- The Golden Key; or, A Heart’s Silent Worship (1905)
- A Heritage of Love; a sequel to The Golden Key (1905)
- Step by Step, A Story of High Ideals (1906), reprinted by Nabu Press (2010) ISBN 1-1777-2889-3
- Nora; or, The Missing Heir of Callonby (1907)
- The Churchyard Betrothal; or, Coals of Fire (1907)
- Gertrude Eliot’s Crucible (1907), reprinted by Tadalique and Company (2022), ISBN 1-952-15319-0
- A True Aristocrat (1910)
- My Lady Beth, a Romance (1910)
- John Hungerford’s Redemption; or, A Life’s Romance (1911)
- Redeemed (1911), reprinted by Nabu Press (2012), ISBN 1-1479-7397-0
