= Fame and Fortune Weekly =

US children's magazine

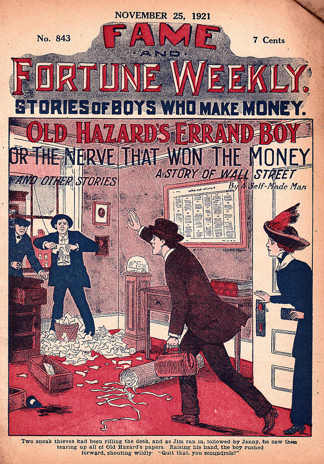
- November 25, 1921 issue
- Frequency: Weekly; Biweekly
- Total circulation: 200,000 in 1918
- First issue: 1905; 121 years ago
- Final issue: 1929
- Country: United States
- Language: English

Fame and Fortune Weekly: Stories of Boys Who Make Money (1905–1929) was an American periodical for children published for most of its existence by Frank Tousey in New York.

Author J. Perkins Tracy has been credited with writing 465 issues of the magazine, but no author was listed in the periodical – the covers stated that stories were written by "A Self-Made Man."

== History and contents ==
The magazine was started in 1905 with the name Fame and Fortune Weekly. The first issue appeared on October 6, 1905. The periodical was widely advertised, with a description that read:

This Weekly contains interesting stories of smart boys, who win fame and fortune by their ability to take advantage of passing opportunities. Some of these stores are founded in the lives of most successful self-made men, and show how a boy of pluck, perseverance and brains can become famous and wealthy. Every one of this series contains a good moral tone which make Fame and Fortune Weekly a magazine for the home, although each number is replete with exciting adventures. The stories are the very best obtainable, the illustrations are by expert artists, and every effort is constantly being made to make it the best weekly on the news stands. Tell your friends about it.

One bookseller compared the Fame and Fortune Weekly stories to Horatio Alger novels, and wrote that the heroes were "Forever rescuing the boss's daughter, finding lost goldmines, or wowing them in Wall Street."

== Change in publisher and magazine title ==
In 1926 Westbury Publishing Company, Inc., a secondary imprint of Smith and Street, purchased the rights to all stories published by Frank Tousey. In 1928 the periodical became a pulp magazine entitled Fame and Fortune Magazine, which was published biweekly. In mid-1929 the name was changed a final time to Fortune Story Magazine. The periodical ceased publication at the end of 1929.
