= Trouble in the Amen Corner =

Single by Archie Campbell
- B-side: "Black Is the Color of My True Love's Hair"
- Released: 1960
- Genre: country gospel
- Length: 2:49
- Label: RCA Victor
- Songwriter: Archie Campbell
- Lyricist: Thomas Chalmers Harbaugh
- Producer: Chet Atkins

"Trouble in the Amen Corner" is a late 19th or early 20th century poem by Thomas Chalmers Harbaugh. In 1960, Archie Campbell turned a slightly modified version of the poem into a country gospel song, with spoken words. The song quotes from the hymn "Rock of Ages", which is mentioned in the original poem. Campbell's version reached #24 in the Billboard country music Top 25.

== Description ==
The elderly Brother Eyer habitually occupied the "amen corner", where the most vocally devout worshipers congregated, in a "fashionable church" with a "stylish congregation". But:

His voice was cracked and broken; age had touched his vocal cords.
And nearly every Sunday he would mispronounce the words
Of the hymns, and 'twas no wonder; he was old and nearly blind,
And the choir rattling onward always left him far behind.

The chorus stormed and blustered, Brother Eyer sang too slow,
And then he used the tunes in vogue a hundred years ago;
At last the storm cloud burst and the church was told, in fine,
That the brother must stop singing, or the choir would resign.

The pastor authorizes a deputation to tell him to desist. This breaks the old man's heart. The other churchgoers soon forget him, but he is now singing sweetly in another place.

== Recordings ==
Recordings of the song by people with Wikipedia articles include:

- 1960 – Archie Campbell
- 1961 – Jim Reeves
- 1966 – Porter Wagoner and the Wagonmasters, on the album The Grand Ole Gospel
- 1966 – Wink Martindale
- 1967 – Tex Ritter, on the album Just Beyond the Moon
- 1993 – Bill Anderson, on the album Country Music Heaven
- 1998 – Jimmy Dean, on the album Inspirational Songs
- 1999 – Porter Wagoner and The Blackwood Brothers, on the album The Grand Old Gospel
- 2003 – Porter Wagoner, on the album 22 Grand Old Gospel 2004
- 2003 – George Hamilton IV, on the album On a Blue Ridge Sunday
- 2006 – James Blackwood and the Light Crust Doughboys, on the album Keep Lookin' Up
- 2007 – Hank Thompson and Porter Wagoner, on the album 100 Years of Hit Recordings
- Gordie Tapp, on the album The Good Life
