= Dime novel =

Type of cheap popular fiction in the U.S.

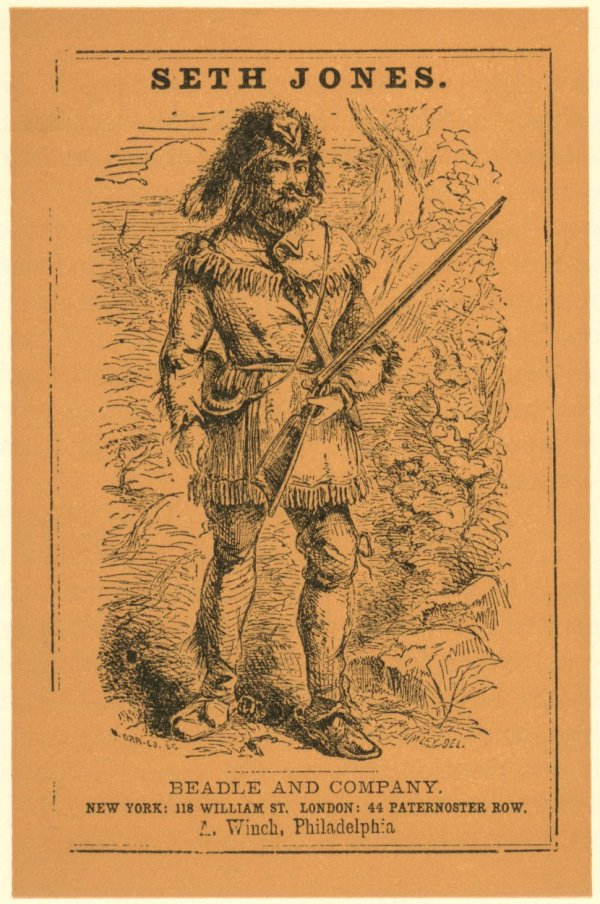
Cover of Seth Jones; or, The Captives of the Frontier by Edward S. Ellis (1860)

The dime novel is a form of late 19th-century and early 20th-century American popular fiction issued in series of inexpensive paperbound editions. The term dime novel has been used as a catchall term for several different but related forms, referring to story papers, five- and ten-cent weeklies, "thick book" reprints, and sometimes early pulp magazines. Dime novels are similar in form and content to British penny dreadfuls and story papers, which were produced at the same time. (Note: The British equivalents were generally called penny dreadfuls or shilling shockers. The German and French equivalents were called Groschenromane ('groschen novels') and livraisons à dix centimes ('ten-cent periodicals'), respectively. American firms also issued foreign editions of many of their works, especially as series characters came into vogue.)

The term was used as a title as late as 1940, in the short-lived pulp magazine Western Dime Novels. In the modern age, the term dime novel has been used to refer to quickly written, lurid potboilers, usually as a pejorative to describe a sensationalized but superficial literary work.

== History ==
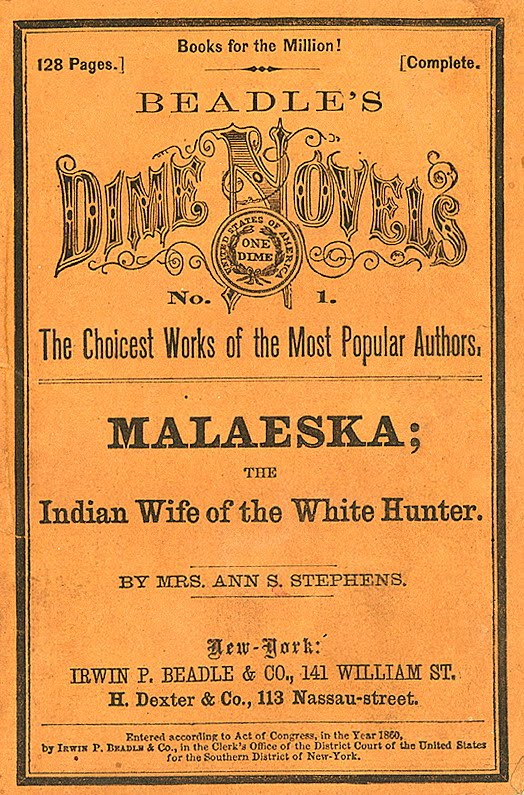
Cover of Malaeska, the Indian Wife of the White Hunter (1860)

In 1860, the publishers Erastus and Irwin Beadle released a new series of cheap paperbacks, Beadle's Dime Novels. Dime novel became a general term for similar paperbacks produced by various publishers in the early twentieth century. The first book in the Beadle series was Malaeska, the Indian Wife of the White Hunter, by Ann S. Stephens, dated June 9, 1860. The novel was essentially a reprint of Stephens's earlier serial, which had appeared in the Ladies' Companion magazine in February, March and April 1839. It sold more than 65,000 copies in the first few months after its publication as a dime novel. Dime novels varied in size, even in the first Beadle series, but were mostly about 6.5 by 4.25 inches (16.5 by 10.8 cm), with 100 pages. The first 28 were published without a cover illustration, in a salmon-colored paper wrapper. A woodblock print was added in issue 29, and the first 28 were reprinted with illustrated covers. The books were priced, of course, at ten cents.

This series ran for 321 issues and established almost all the conventions of the genre, from the lurid and outlandish story to the melodramatic double titling used throughout the series, which ended in the 1920s. Most of the stories were frontier tales reprinted from the numerous serials in the story papers and other sources, (Note: Lax copyright enforcement allowed the publication of many foreign literary works without payment of royalties.) but many were original stories.

As the popularity of dime novels increased, original stories came to be the norm. The books were reprinted many times, sometimes with different covers, and the stories were often further reprinted in different series and by different publishers. (Note: The proliferation of reprints has been a source of confusion about first printings. As a general rule, the date of the printing can be determined from the other titles in the series listed on the back cover. Dime novels were issued in twos or sometimes fours, so a first printing does not list more than three numbers beyond the number on the cover, whereas a later printing may list a hundred titles beyond the cover number. The books are so rare now that the lateness of the printing does not much affect their price.)

The literacy rate increased around the time of the American Civil War, and Beadle's Dime Novels were immediately popular among young, working-class readers. By the end of the war, numerous competitors, such as George Munro and Robert DeWitt, were crowding the field, distinguishing their product only by title and the color of the paper wrappers. Beadle & Adams had their own alternate "brands", such as the Frank Starr line. As a whole, the quality of the fiction was derided by highbrow critics, and the term dime novel came to refer to any form of cheap, sensational fiction, rather than the specific format.

Nonetheless, the pocket-sized sea, Western, railway, circus, gold-digger, and other adventures were an instant success. Author Armin Jaemmrich observes that Alexis de Tocqueville's thesis in Democracy in America (1835) says that in democratic and socially permeable societies, like that of the U.S., the lower classes were not "naturally indifferent to science, literature, and the arts: only it must be acknowledged that they cultivate them after their own fashion, and bring to the task their own peculiar qualifications and deficiencies." He found that in aristocratic societies education and interest in literature were confined to a small upper class, and that the literary class would arrive at a "sort of aristocratic jargon, ... hardly less remote from pure language than was the coarse dialect of the people." According to Tocqueville, due to the heterogeneity of its population, the situation in the U.S. was different, and people were asking for reading matter. Since, in his view, practically every American was busy earning a living with no time for obtaining a higher education let alone for timeconsuming distractions, they preferred books which "may be easily procured, quickly read, and which require no learned researches to be understood ... they require rapid emotions, startling passages .... Small productions will be more common than bulky books ... The object of authors will be to astonish rather than to please, and to stir the passions more than to charm the taste." Written twenty-five years prior to the emergence of the dimes, his words read like an exact anticipation of their main characteristics.

=== Prices ===
Adding to the general confusion as to what is or is not a dime novel, many of the series, though similar in design and subject, cost ten (a dime) to fifteen cents. Beadle & Adams complicated the matter by issuing some titles in the same salmon-colored covers at different prices. Also, there were a number of ten-cent, paper-covered books of the period that featured medieval romance stories and melodramatic tales. This makes it hard to define what falls in the category of the dime novel, with classification depending on format, price, or style of material. Examples of dime novel series that illustrate the diversity of the form include Bunce's Ten Cent Novels, Brady's Mercury Stories, Beadle's Dime Novels, Irwin P. Beadle's Ten Cent Stories, Munro's Ten Cent Novels, Dawley's Ten Penny Novels, Fireside Series, Chaney's Union Novels, DeWitt's Ten Cent Romances, Champion Novels, Frank Starr's American Novels, Ten Cent Novelettes, Richmond's Sensation Novels, and Ten Cent Irish Novels.

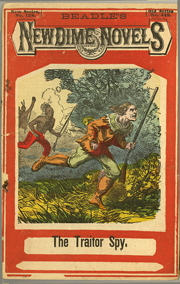
The New Dime Novel Series introduced color covers but reprinted stories from the original series

In 1874, Beadle & Adams added the novelty of color to the covers when their New Dime Novels series replaced the flagship title. The New Dime Novels were issued with a dual numbering system on the cover, one continuing the numbering from the first series and the second and more prominent one indicating the number in the current series; for example, the first issue was numbered 1 (322). The stories were mostly reprints from the first series. Like its predecessor, Beadle's New Dime Novels ran for 321 issues, until 1885.

=== Development ===
Much of the content of dime novels came from story papers, which were weekly, eight-page newspaper-like publications, varying in size from tabloid to full-size newspaper format and usually costing five or six cents. They started in the mid-1850s and were immensely popular, some titles being issued for over fifty years on a weekly schedule. They are perhaps best described as the television of their day, containing a variety of serial stories and articles, with something aimed at each member of the family, and often illustrated profusely with woodcuts. Popular story papers included The Saturday Journal, Young Men of America, Golden Weekly, Golden Hours, Good News, and Happy Days. (Note: There were English story papers as well, containing much the same sort of content. The stories were similarly reprinted in various other formats.)

Most of the stories in dime novels stood alone, but in the late 1880s series characters began to appear and quickly grew in popularity. The original Frank Reade stories first appeared in Boys of New York. The Old Sleuth, appearing in The Fireside Companion story paper beginning in 1872, was the first dime-novel detective and began the trend away from the western and frontier stories that dominated the story papers and dime novels up to that time. He was the first character to use the word sleuth to denote a detective, the word's original definition being that of a bloodhound trained to track. He is also responsible for the popularity of the use of the word old in the names of competing dime novel detectives, such as Old Cap Collier, Old Broadbrim, Old King Brady, Old Lightning, and Old Ferret, among many others. Nick Carter first appeared in 1886 in the New York Weekly. Frank Reade, the Old Sleuth and Nick Carter had their own ten-cent weekly titles within a few years. (Note: Nick Carter has proved to be one of the most durable, if bland, fictional characters of all time. In one incarnation or another, he has been active for over 100 years, most recently as Nick Carter, Killmaster, in a long-running paperback series.)

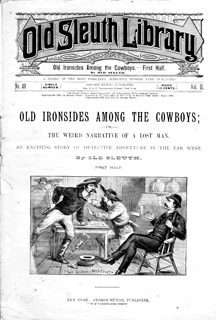
Old Sleuth Library, 1888

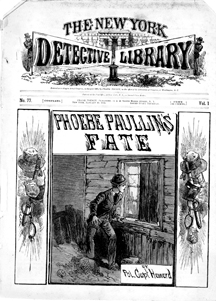
Frank Tousey's major black-and-white library, 1884

=== Changing formats ===
In 1873, the house of Beadle & Adams introduced a new ten-cent format, 9 by 13.25 inches (229 mm × 337 mm), with only 32 pages and a black-and-white illustration on the cover, under the title New and Old Friends. It was not a success, but the format was so much cheaper to produce that they tried again in 1877 with The Fireside Library and Frank Starr's New York Library. The first reprinted English love stories, the second contained hardier material, but both titles caught on. Publishers were no less eager to follow a new trend then than now. Soon the newsstands were flooded by ten-cent weekly "libraries". These publications also varied in size, from as small as 7 x 10 inches (The Boy's Star Library is an example) to 8.5 x 12 (New York Detective Library). The Old Cap Collier Library was issued in both sizes and also in booklet form. Each issue tended to feature a single story, unlike the story papers, and many of them were devoted to a single character. Frontier stories, evolving into westerns, were still popular, but the new vogue tended to urban crime stories. One of the most successful titles, Frank Tousey's New York Detective Library eventually came to alternate stories of the James Gang with stories of Old King Brady, detective, and (in a rare occurrence in the dime novel) several stories which featured both, with Old King Brady doggedly on the trail of the vicious gang. (Note: Nick Carter was also a character in stories featuring other detectives, such as Old Broadbrim, much as superheroes crossover in today's comic books.)

The competition was fierce, and publishers were always looking for an edge. Once again, color came into play when Frank Tousey introduced a weekly with brightly colored covers in 1896. Street & Smith countered by issuing a weekly in a smaller format with muted colors. Such titles as New Nick Carter Weekly (continuing the original black-and-white Nick Carter Library), Tip-Top Weekly (introducing Frank Merriwell) and others were 7 x 10 inches with thirty-two pages of text, but the 8.5 x 11 Tousey format carried the day, and Street & Smith soon followed suit. The price was also dropped to five cents, making the magazines more accessible to children. This would be the last major permutation of the product before it evolved into pulp magazines. Ironically, for many years it has been the nickel weeklies that most people refer to when using the term dime novel.

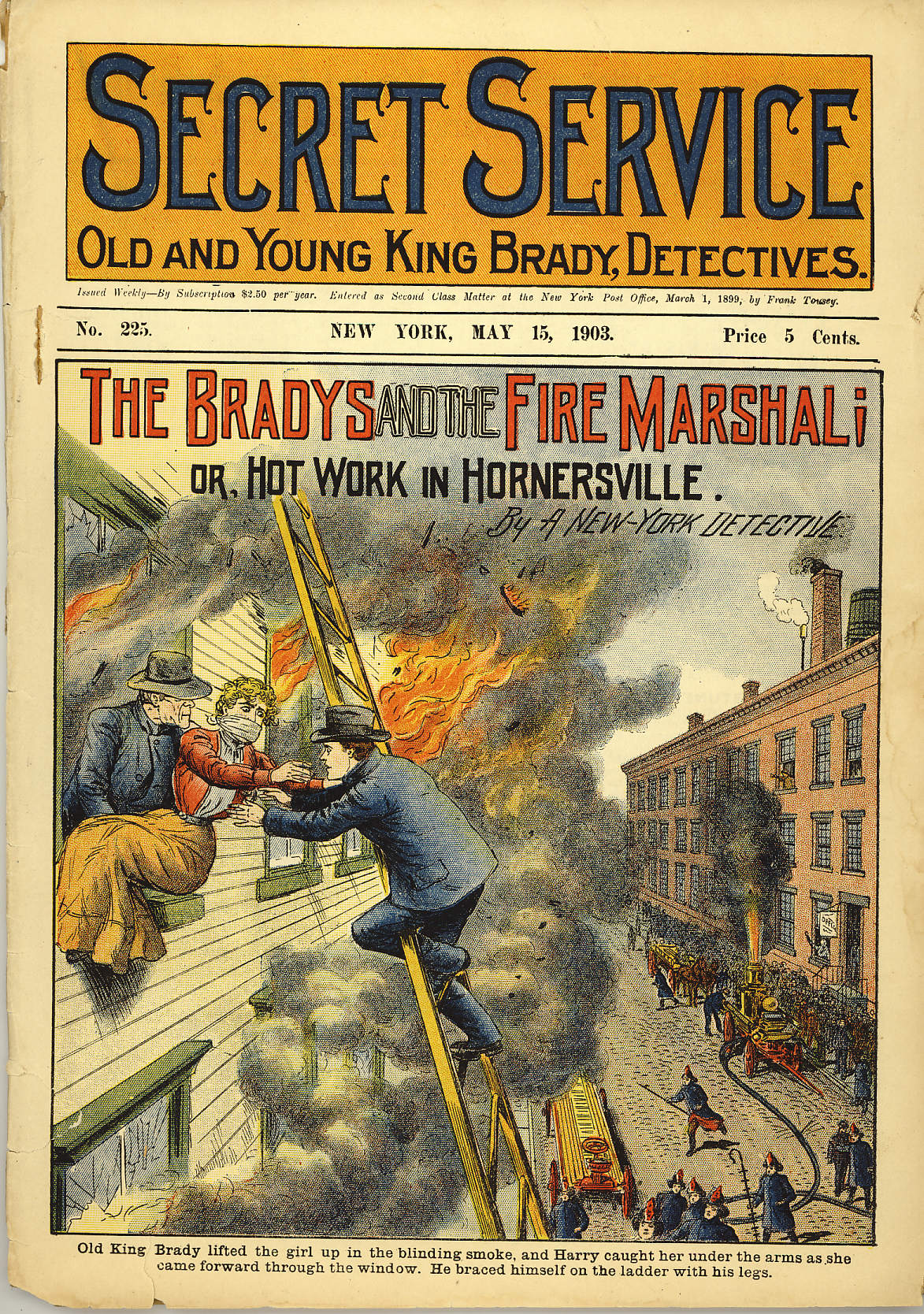
One of the most popular color-covered nickel weeklies, Secret Service, no. 225, May 15, 1903

The nickel weeklies were popular, and their numbers grew quickly. Frank Tousey and Street & Smith dominated the field. Tousey had his "big six": Work and Win (featuring Fred Fearnot, a serious rival to the soon-to-be-popular Frank Merriwell), Secret Service, Pluck and Luck, Wild West Weekly, Fame and Fortune Weekly, and The Liberty Boys of '76, each of which issued over a thousand copies weekly. (Note: Several shorter runs are among the most collectible today: Frank Reade Weekly (the color-cover followup to the Frank Reade Library) and The James Boys.) Street & Smith had New Nick Carter Weekly, Tip Top Weekly, Buffalo Bill Stories, Jesse James Stories, Brave & Bold Weekly and many others. The Tousey stories were generally the more lurid and sensational of the two.

Perhaps the most confusing of the various formats lumped together under the term dime novel are the so-called "thick-book" series, most of which were published by Street & Smith, J. S. Ogilvie and Arthur Westbrook. These books were published in series, contained roughly 150 to 200 pages, and were 4.75 by 7 inches (121 mm × 178 mm), often with color covers on a higher-grade stock. They reprinted multiple stories from the five- and ten-cent weeklies, often slightly rewritten to tie them together.

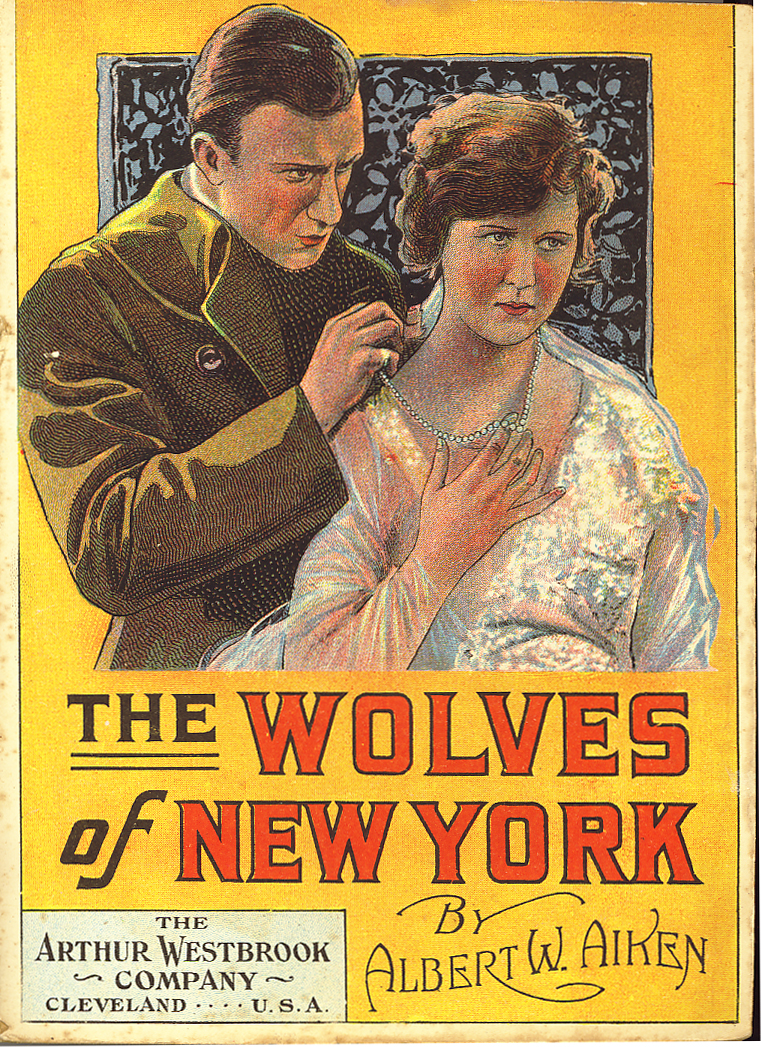
An example of a "thick book" series, American Detective Series, no. 21, Arthur Westbrook Co.

All dime-novel publishers were canny about reusing and refashioning material, but Street & Smith excelled at it. They developed the practice of publishing four consecutive, related tales of, for example, Nick Carter, in the weekly magazine, then combining the four stories into one edition of the related thick-book series, in this instance, the New Magnet Library. (Note: In addition, Street & Smith bought the rights to other detective stories and had them strung together and rewritten into Nick Carter stories, allowing the New Magnet Library to run for over 1,000 issues.) The Frank Merriwell stories appeared in the Medal, New Medal and Merriwell libraries, Buffalo Bill in the Buffalo Bill Library and Far West Library, and so on. The thick books were still in print as late as the 1930s but carry the copyright date of the original story, often as early as the late nineteenth century, leading some dealers and new collectors today to erroneously assume they have original dime novels when the books are only distantly related.

=== Demise ===
In 1896, Frank Munsey had converted his juvenile magazine Argosy into a fiction magazine for adults, the first of the pulp magazines. By the turn of the century, new high-speed printing techniques combined with cheaper pulp paper allowed him to drop the price from twenty-five cents to ten cents, and sales of the magazine took off. In 1910, Street and Smith converted two of their nickel weeklies, New Tip Top Weekly and Top Notch Magazine, into pulps; in 1915, Nick Carter Stories, itself a replacement for the New Nick Carter Weekly, became Detective Story Magazine, and in 1919, New Buffalo Bill Weekly became Western Story Magazine. Harry Wolff, the successor in interest to the Frank Tousey titles, continued to reprint many of them into the mid-1920s, most notably Secret Service, Pluck and Luck, Fame and Fortune and Wild West Weekly. These two series were purchased by Street & Smith in 1926 and converted into pulp magazines the following year, effectively ending the era of the dime novel.

== Collections ==
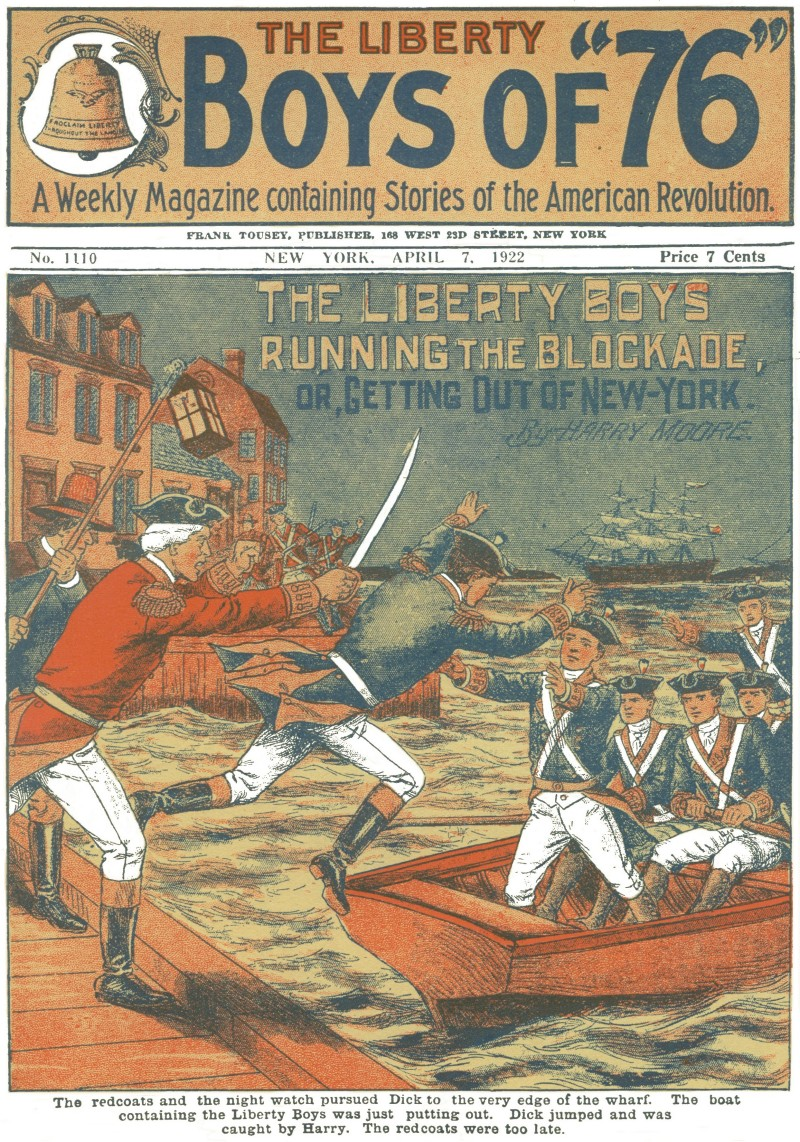
Cover of The Liberty Boys Running the Blockade, by Harry Moore, in The Liberty Boys of '76, April 7, 1922

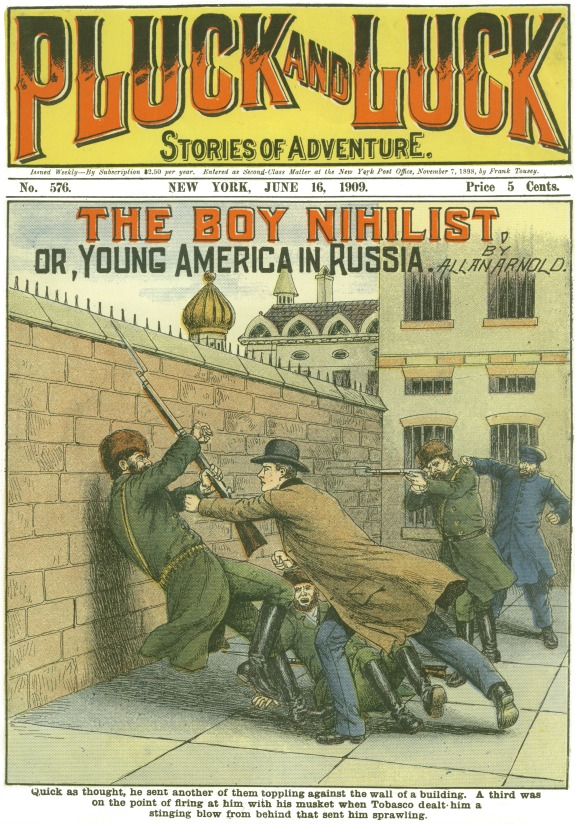
Cover of The Boy Nihilist, by Allan Arnold, in Pluck and Luck, June 16, 1909

In the late 1940s and early 1950s, collecting dime novels became popular, and prices soared. Even at that time, the cheap publications were crumbling into dust and becoming hard to find. Two collectors, Charles Bragin and Ralph Cummings, issued a number of reprints of hard-to-find titles from some of the weekly libraries. (Note: These reprints turn up frequently and are often confused with originals, as the notice of their reprint status is not prominent.)

- The Library of Congress through copyright deposit has accumulated a collection of nearly 40,000 titles.
- The University of Minnesota's Hess Collection has a collection of over 65,000 dime novels, among the largest in North America.
- Northern Illinois University's Rare Books and Special Collections holds over 50,000 dime novels in its Johannsen and LeBlanc Collections. More than 12,000 volumes from these collections have been digitized and made freely available online through Nickels and Dimes.
- Villanova University's Dime Novel and Popular Literature Collection was established in 2012 when the collection of Charles Moore Magee was rediscovered in storage. This formed the seed around which a larger collection was grown through acquisitions and donations from scholars. Much of the collection has been digitized and is available online through Villanova University's Digital Library.
- Stanford University has a collection of over 8,000 individual dime novels and a website devoted to the subject.
- The University of South Florida–Tampa Special Collections Department has a collection of nearly 9,000 dime novels, including Frank Tousey's Frank Reade Library and the Frank Reade Weekly Magazine..
- The Edward G. Levy Dime Novel Collection is housed at the Fales Library at New York University. A complete finding aid to the collection is available online.
- The Fales Library at New York University also houses the Ralph Adimari Papers and the William J. Benners Papers. Adimari was a historian who studied dime novels. His papers include research notes, clippings, and ephemera related to dime novels. Benners was a writer and publisher of dime novels. Fales Library guide to the Ralph Adimari Papers. Fales Library guide to the William J. Benners Papers.
- The University of Missouri, Columbia, houses a small collection of dime novels in its Division of Special Collections, Archives and Rare Books..
- Brandeis University's Archives & Special Collections Department has a collection of dime novels and juvenile literature dating from 1805 to 1979. A preliminary container list is now available online..
- The Texas Collection at Baylor University has a collection of nearly 350 dime novels from 1861 to 1919.
- The Dolph Briscoe Center for American History at the University of Texas at Austin houses a collection of 212 of Beadle's dime novels.
- The Athenaeum of Philadelphia holds a small collection of dime novels (11 boxes) that were collected by the Rev. Roland Sawyer and donated by Roland D. Sawyer, Jr. It includes substantial runs of Beadle's Dime Library and Beadle's Half Dime Library and smaller numbers of Deadwood Dick Library and other titles.
- Syracuse University Libraries holds a collection of Street and Smith novels and the records of the publishers.

== See also ==
- Melodrama
- Horror fiction
- Penny dreadful
- Pulp magazine
- Gothic fiction
- Eugene T. Sawyer

== Bibliography ==
- Lyons, Martyn (2011). Books: A Living History. California: J. Paul Getty Museum. ISBN 9781606060834.
- Jaemmrich, Armin (2016). The American Noir: A Rehabilitation. CreateSpace Independent Publishing Platform. ISBN 9781523664405.
- Cox, J. Randolph (2000). The Dime Novel Companion: A Source Book. Greenwood Publishing Group. ISBN 9780313256745.
- Denning, Michael (1998). Mechanic Accents: Dime Novels and Working-class Culture in America. Verso. ISBN 9781859842508.
- Johannsen, Albert (1950). The House of Beadle and Adams and its Nickel and Dime Novels. University of Oklahoma Press.
- LeBlanc, Edward, The Dime Novel Round-Up, multiple issues.
- Pearson, Edmund Lester (1929). Dime Novels: or, Following an Old Trail in Popular Literature. Little, Brown, and Company.
