= Thomas Chalmers Harbaugh =

American poet

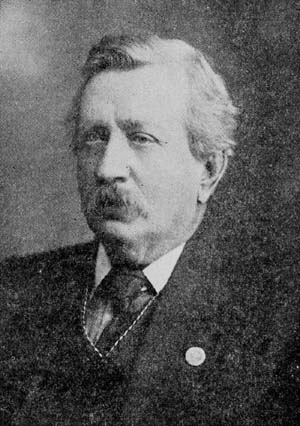
Thomas C. Harbaugh (1849-1924)

Thomas Chalmers Harbaugh (January 13, 1849 – October 28, 1924) was an American poet and novelist.

== Biography ==
He was born on January 13, 1849, in Middletown, Maryland. When he was two years old, his family moved to Casstown, Ohio, where he was educated in local schools. He thereafter he worked for his father, a house painter. In 1867 began to devote his time to writing, mainly of short stories and serials for dime novels. He was one of the authors of the Nick Carter Detective Stories. He wrote from 300 to 600 thrillers, at the rate of one a week, with pen; later, in the days of the typewriter, he sometimes bettered his speed. Harbaugh had at least 20 pennames including Capt. Collier. He died penniless in the Miami County Poor House, Ohio on October 28, 1924.

== Legacy ==
He is known for the sentimental poem "Trouble in the Amen Corner". Some of its verses have been turned into a song, which has been recorded several times with commercial success.
