= Corinna, Maine =

Town in Maine, United States

- Town
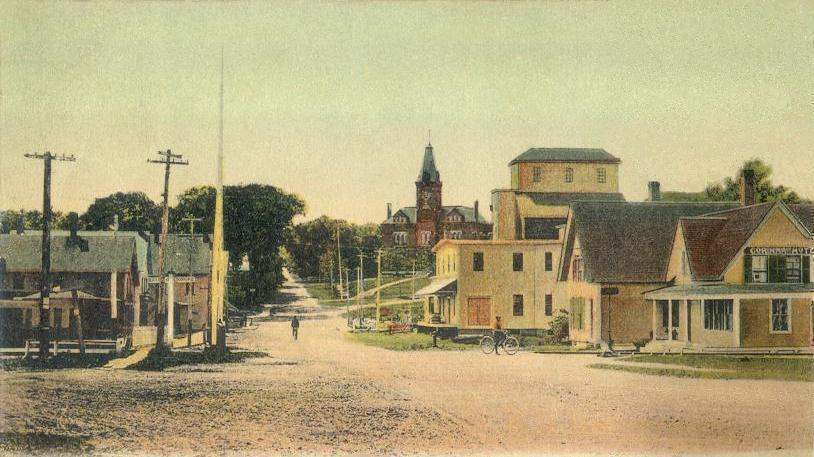
- Downtown in 1908

- Location within Maine Location within the United States
- Coordinates: 45°00′02″N 69°14′23″W
- Country: United States
- State: Maine
- County: Penobscot
- Incorporated: 1816

Area
  - Total: 39.46 sq mi (102.20 km^{2})
  - Land: 38.68 sq mi (100.18 km^{2})
  - Water: 0.78 sq mi (2.02 km^{2})
- Elevation: 331 ft (101 m)

Population (2020)
  - Total: 2,221
  - Density: 57/sq mi (22.2/km^{2})
- Time zone: UTC-5 (Eastern (EST))
  - Summer (DST): UTC-4 (EDT)
- ZIP code: 04928
- Area code: 207
- FIPS code: 23-14310
- GNIS feature ID: 582419
- Website: www.corinna.govoffice.com

Corinna is a town in Penobscot County, Maine, United States. The population was 2,221 at the 2020 census. It is part of the Bangor metropolitan statistical area. The village of Corinna is in the southern part of the town.

== History ==
It was first called T4 R4 NWP (or Township 4, Range 4, North of the Waldo Patent). On June 30, 1804, Dr. John Warren of Boston bought 23,040 acres (93 km^{2}) on speculation from Massachusetts for two cents an acre, or $460.80. To encourage settlement, he gave away some land and built a combination gristmill and sawmill. The town would be incorporated on December 11, 1816, as Corinna, named after Dr. Warren's daughter.

The first homes were built of hewn logs. Corinna developed into a farming community, with water powered mills at the outlet of Corundel Lake. After the arrival of the Dexter and Newport Railroad in 1865–1866, the village developed into a small mill town. Industries would include sawmills, planing mills, woolen textile mills, and a door, sash and blind factory. There were also boot and shoemaking shops and an iron foundry. The Eastland Woolen Mill manufactured woolen materials from the 1930s until it closed in 1997, after which it was demolished.

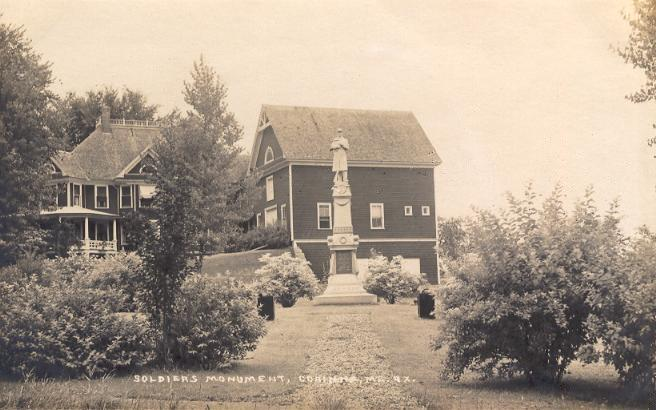
Soldiers' Monument c. 1912

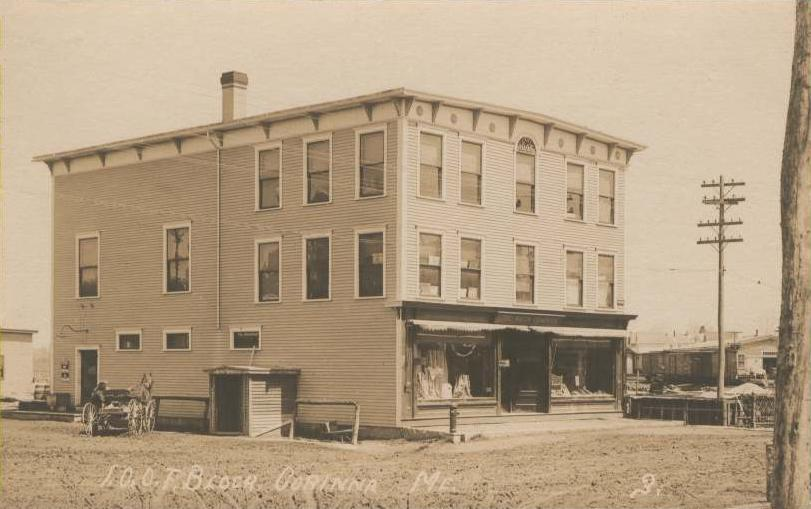
Odd Fellows' Hall c. 1912

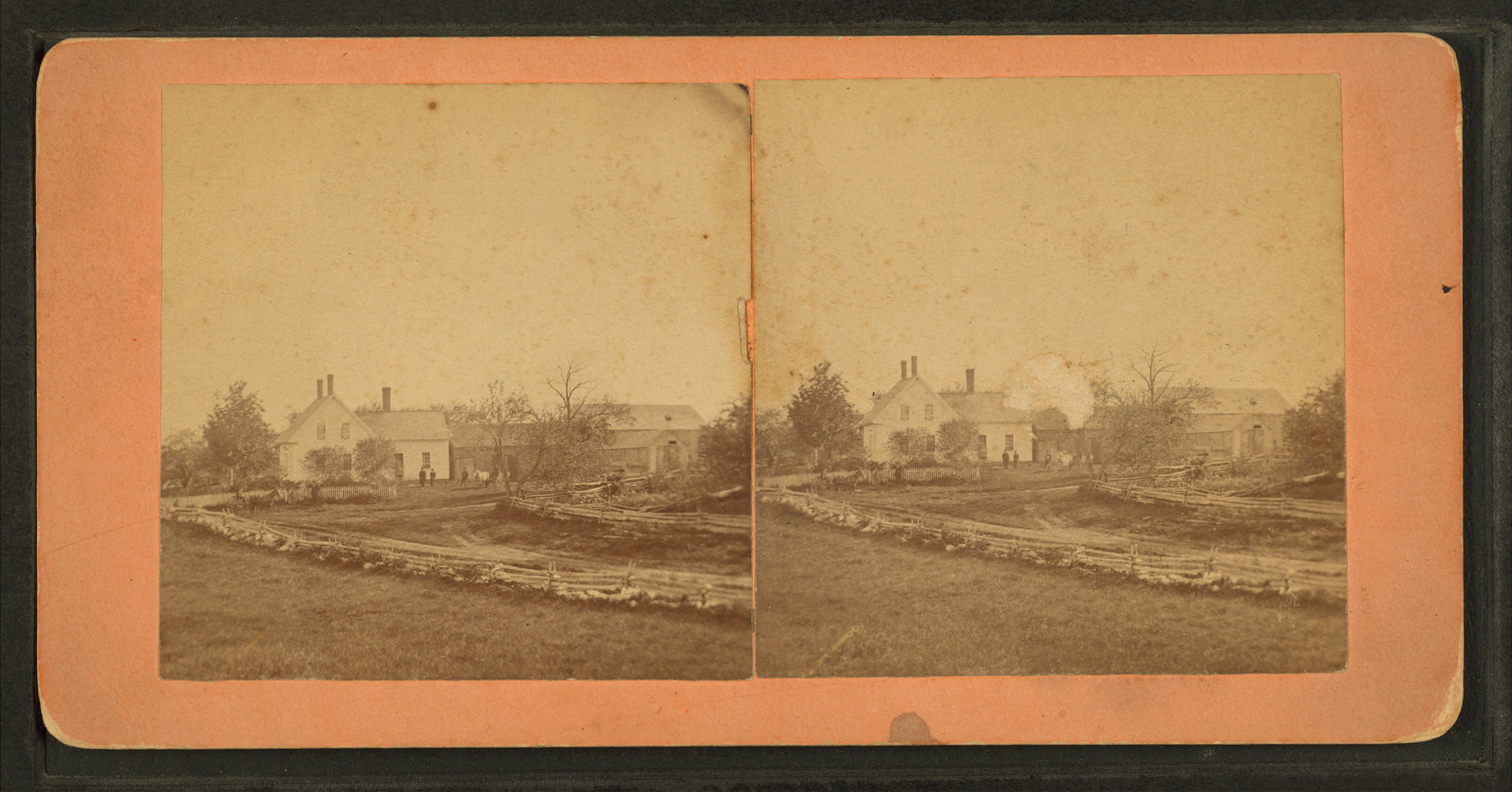
Fisher residence c. 1870

=== Historic building ===
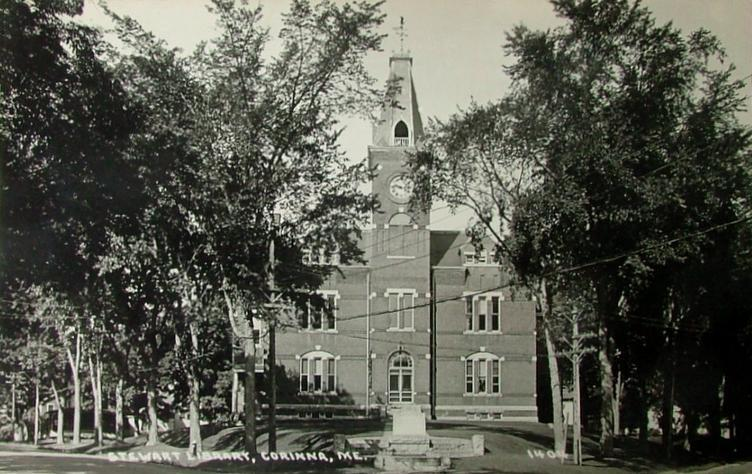
Stewart Free Library c. 1920

The Stewart Free Library (1898), a gift to the town by Corinna-born Minneapolis millionaire Levi M. Stewart, was designed by Minneapolis architect William Harrison Grimshaw. The library is listed on the National Register of Historic Places, and contains well-preserved historic interiors as well as a majestic facade with a clocktower. It resembles a mid-western county courthouse more than a typical small-town Maine library. The Corinna Union Academy educated students in the town from 1851 to 1968.

A memorial dedicated to the soldiers who have died in the war on terror is located near the river. It is made of marble and inscribed with the names of fallen soldiers.

== Geography ==
According to the United States Census Bureau, the town has a total area of 39.46 square miles (102.20 km^{2}), of which 38.68 square miles (100.18 km^{2}) is land and 0.78 square miles (2.02 km^{2}) is water. Situated beside Corundel Lake, Corinna is drained by the East Branch Sebasticook River and Alder Stream, both part of the Kennebec River watershed.

The town is located at the intersection of Route 7 (Dexter Road), Route 11 (Exeter Road) and Route 43 (St. Albans Road), and is centered between the towns of Exeter, St. Albans, Dexter and Newport, about 8 miles (13 km) north of Interstate 95. Corinna is also located on the Newport/Dover-Foxcroft Rail Trail, which was developed along a former Maine Central Railroad line after tracks and ties were removed in 1993.

=== Climate ===
This climatic region is typified by large seasonal temperature differences, with warm to hot (and often humid) summers and cold (sometimes severely cold) winters. According to the Köppen Climate Classification system, Corinna has a humid continental climate, abbreviated "Dfb" on climate maps.

Climate data for Corinna, Maine (1991–2020 normals, extremes 1947–present)
Month	Jan	Feb	Mar	Apr	May	Jun	Jul	Aug	Sep	Oct	Nov	Dec	Year
Record high °F (°C)	62 (17)	63 (17)	86 (30)	92 (33)	97 (36)	96 (36)	97 (36)	97 (36)	95 (35)	85 (29)	76 (24)	63 (17)	97 (36)
Mean maximum °F (°C)	48.7 (9.3)	48.7 (9.3)	58.1 (14.5)	74.3 (23.5)	85.3 (29.6)	89.8 (32.1)	90.2 (32.3)	89.4 (31.9)	85.8 (29.9)	75.2 (24.0)	63.4 (17.4)	52.2 (11.2)	92.9 (33.8)
Mean daily maximum °F (°C)	28.2 (−2.1)	31.9 (−0.1)	41.0 (5.0)	54.0 (12.2)	66.9 (19.4)	75.1 (23.9)	80.5 (26.9)	79.6 (26.4)	72.0 (22.2)	59.1 (15.1)	46.0 (7.8)	34.2 (1.2)	55.7 (13.2)
Daily mean °F (°C)	17.1 (−8.3)	19.3 (−7.1)	29.6 (−1.3)	42.6 (5.9)	54.7 (12.6)	63.8 (17.7)	69.2 (20.7)	67.7 (19.8)	59.8 (15.4)	47.9 (8.8)	36.7 (2.6)	25.0 (−3.9)	44.4 (6.9)
Mean daily minimum °F (°C)	6.0 (−14.4)	6.8 (−14.0)	18.2 (−7.7)	31.2 (−0.4)	42.5 (5.8)	52.4 (11.3)	58.0 (14.4)	55.8 (13.2)	47.6 (8.7)	36.6 (2.6)	27.3 (−2.6)	15.8 (−9.0)	33.2 (0.7)
Mean minimum °F (°C)	−18.9 (−28.3)	−16.6 (−27.0)	−7.5 (−21.9)	18.0 (−7.8)	29.2 (−1.6)	38.5 (3.6)	46.3 (7.9)	43.4 (6.3)	32.2 (0.1)	23.1 (−4.9)	10.7 (−11.8)	−6.5 (−21.4)	−22.5 (−30.3)
Record low °F (°C)	−38 (−39)	−39 (−39)	−28 (−33)	−3 (−19)	21 (−6)	29 (−2)	35 (2)	31 (−1)	20 (−7)	15 (−9)	−6 (−21)	−31 (−35)	−39 (−39)
Average precipitation inches (mm)	3.36 (85)	2.82 (72)	3.44 (87)	3.83 (97)	3.64 (92)	4.02 (102)	3.22 (82)	3.59 (91)	3.56 (90)	4.77 (121)	4.11 (104)	4.34 (110)	44.70 (1,135)
Average snowfall inches (cm)	18.0 (46)	17.7 (45)	13.3 (34)	4.4 (11)	0.2 (0.51)	0.0 (0.0)	0.0 (0.0)	0.0 (0.0)	0.0 (0.0)	0.7 (1.8)	4.4 (11)	16.4 (42)	78.1 (198)
Average precipitation days (≥ 0.01 in)	10.0	9.0	10.0	11.0	12.0	12.0	12.0	11.0	10.0	11.0	12.0	11.0	128.0
Average snowy days (≥ 0.1 in)	7.0	7.0	5.0	2.0	0.0	0.0	0.0	0.0	0.0	0.0	2.0	6.0	29.0
Source: NOAA

== Demographics ==
Historical population
Census	Pop.	Note	%±
1820	411		—
1830	1,079		162.5%
1840	1,704		57.9%
1850	1,550		−9.0%
1860	1,597		3.0%
1870	1,513		−5.3%
1880	1,503		−0.7%
1890	1,207		−19.7%
1900	1,170		−3.1%
1910	1,237		5.7%
1920	1,394		12.7%
1930	1,485		6.5%
1940	1,515		2.0%
1950	1,752		15.6%
1960	1,895		8.2%
1970	1,700		−10.3%
1980	1,887		11.0%
1990	2,196		16.4%
2000	2,145		−2.3%
2010	2,198		2.5%
2020	2,221		1.0%
U.S. Decennial Census

=== 2010 census ===
As of the census of 2010, there were 2,198 people, 926 households, and 622 families living in the town. The population density was 56.8 inhabitants per square mile (21.9/km^{2}). There were 1,075 housing units at an average density of 27.8 per square mile (10.7/km^{2}). The racial makeup of the town was 97.2% White, 0.3% African American, 0.3% Native American, 0.2% Asian, 0.1% from other races, and 1.9% from two or more races. Hispanic or Latino of any race were 0.6% of the population.

There were 926 households, of which 28.8% had children under the age of 18 living with them, 50.8% were married couples living together, 9.7% had a female householder with no husband present, 6.7% had a male householder with no wife present, and 32.8% were non-families. 25.3% of all households were made up of individuals, and 11.4% had someone living alone who was 65 years of age or older. The average household size was 2.37 and the average family size was 2.81.

The median age in the town was 43 years. 22.5% of residents were under the age of 18; 7% were between the ages of 18 and 24; 22.9% were from 25 to 44; 30.7% were from 45 to 64; and 16.9% were 65 years of age or older. The gender makeup of the town was 48.6% male and 51.4% female.

=== 2000 census ===
As of the census of 2000, there were 2,145 people, 842 households, and 621 families living in the town. The population density was 55.5 inhabitants per square mile (21.4/km^{2}). There were 981 housing units at an average density of 25.4 per square mile (9.8/km^{2}). The racial makeup of the town was 98.18% White, 0.42% African American, 0.14% Native American, 0.09% Asian, 0.23% from other races, and 0.93% from two or more races. Hispanic or Latino of any race were 0.51% of the population.

There were 842 households, out of which 31.0% had children under the age of 18 living with them, 60.0% were married couples living together, 8.2% had a female householder with no husband present, and 26.2% were non-families. 21.0% of all households were made up of individuals, and 10.7% had someone living alone who was 65 years of age or older. The average household size was 2.55 and the average family size was 2.89.

In the town, the population was spread out, with 24.9% under the age of 18, 7.4% from 18 to 24, 28.0% from 25 to 44, 24.4% from 45 to 64, and 15.4% who were 65 years of age or older. The median age was 39 years. For every 100 females, there were 99.5 males. For every 100 females age 18 and over, there were 99.6 males.

The median income for a household in the town was $32,115, and the median income for a family was $37,900. Males had a median income of $28,707 versus $17,500 for females. The per capita income for the town was $17,345. About 14.1% of families and 19.5% of the population were below the poverty line, including 26.4% of those under age 18 and 8.5% of those age 65 or over.

== Site of interest ==
- Corinna Historical Society Museum

== Education ==
Corinna is part of Regional School Unit #19. Mike Hammer is the Superintendent of Schools.

== Notable people ==
- Grenville C. Emery, founder of Harvard-Westlake School
- Sam Fifield, Wisconsin politician
- Gilbert Patten, author
