= Emerson Bell =

Emerson Bell may refer to:

- Emerson Bell (artist) (1930–2006), American artist
- Emerson Bell (1866–1945), pen name of American author Gilbert Patten
