= The Adventures of Frank Merriwell =

American radio juvenile adventure series (1934, 1946–1949)

The Adventures of Frank Merriwell is a juvenile adventure radio program that was broadcast on NBC March 26 - June 22, 1934, and again on NBC October 5, 1946 - June 4, 1949. Episodes were adapted from books written by Burt L. Standish (pen name of Gilbert Patten).

== 1934 version ==
The Adventures of Frank Merriwell first ran on NBC radio from March 26 to June 22, 1934 as a 15-minute serial airing three times a week at 5:30 pm. Sponsored by Dr. West's Toothpaste, this program starred Donald Briggs as Frank Merriwell. Harlow Wilcox was the announcer. Ed King and Fred Weihe were the directors. Bill Welch and Ruth and Gilbert Brann were the writers. Patten was not involved in the program. Briggs's popularity in the role led to his portraying Merriwell in The Adventures of Frank Merriwell, a 12-part film serial.

== 1946-1949 version ==
After a 12-year gap, the series returned October 5, 1946 as a 30-minute NBC Saturday morning show, continuing until June 4, 1949. Lawson Zerbe (1914–1992) starred as Merriwell, Jean Gillespie and Elaine Rostas as Inza Burrage, Harold Studer as Bart Hodge and Patricia Hosley as Elsie Belwood. Announcers were Mel Brandt and Harlow Wilcox, and the Paul Taubman Orchestra supplied the background music. In late October 1948, the program was moved from 10 a.m. Eastern Time on Saturdays to 12:30 p.m. E. T. on Saturdays. Merriwell was a Yale University student at the turn of the 20th century who fought evil. The program's theme was "Boola Boola", the Yale song. Episodes from this version were repeated on some radio stations in syndication in the 1970s.

Jack Gould wrote in The New York Times in September 1948 that the second version of the program did not "bear any reasonable resemblance to the original stories" and said that the title "might mislead parents as to its wholesomeness". Gould noted that one year earlier NBC had limited broadcasting of crime shows to 9:30 p. m. Eastern Time or later because of the effects that they might have on children. Frank Merriwell, however, with its "saga of assault, arson, larceny and horror", was presented at 10 a.m. He supported his comments by including segments of the script of the September 11, 1948, episode.

== Television ==
Frank Merriwell, a pilot for a comedy television series, was broadcast on CBS on July 25, 1966. Leslie Stevens produced and wrote the pilot, and Allen F. Miller directed it. The cast included:

- Frank Merriwell - Jeff Cooper
- Elsie Stanhope - Tisha Sterling
- Binkie Stubbs - Bruce Hyde
- Brandon Drood - Beau Bridges
- Bart Farge - Murvyn Vye

== See also ==
- The Adventures of Frank Merriwell (serial)
