= Corinna Union Academy =

School in Corinna, Maine

Coordinates: 44°55′17.6″N 69°15′56.6″W

- Corinna, Maine; United States

Information
- Established: 1851
- Closed: 1968

Corinna Union Academy was a historic school in Corinna, Maine that is now a museum.

Corinna Union Academy was founded in 1851 when seventy citizens founded an organization and constructed the high school academy building. In 1852 the Maine legislature provided the school with a charter. The building was expanded in 1931. Corinna Union Academy closed in 1968 as a high school and local students began attending Nokomis Regional High, SAD 48, but the building was still used as Corinna Junior High until it closed in 1998.

== Notable alumni ==
- Gilbert Patten, author of dime novels
- Grenville C. Emery, founder of Harvard-Westlake School
