= William Harrison Grimshaw =

American architect (1853–1922)

William Harrison Grimshaw (December 6, 1853 – May 24, 1922) was an American architect, contractor, politician, and U.S. Marshal based in Minneapolis, Minnesota.

He was born in Philadelphia in 1853, the son of Robert Elwood Grimshaw, a contractor and builder, and Mary Page Nicholson, from an old Philadelphia family. His mother died when he was three and his father moved the family to Minnesota in 1855.

His architectural works include 13 public schools in Minneapolis and county courthouses throughout Minnesota. One of his works, the Stewart Free Library (1895) in Corinna, Maine, was listed on the National Register of Historic Places in 1974.

Grimshaw was a prominent figure in Minnesota politics. In 1885, he was elected to the Minnesota Legislature. He also managed three senate campaigns for Cushman Kellogg Davis, two for Knute Nelson, and two for Moses Clapp.

Grimshaw served as a United States Marshal for 17 years, first appointed in 1889 by President William McKinley. He was reappointed a marshal by McKinley and twice by President Theodore Roosevelt.
