= Stewart Free Library =

- U.S. National Register of Historic Places
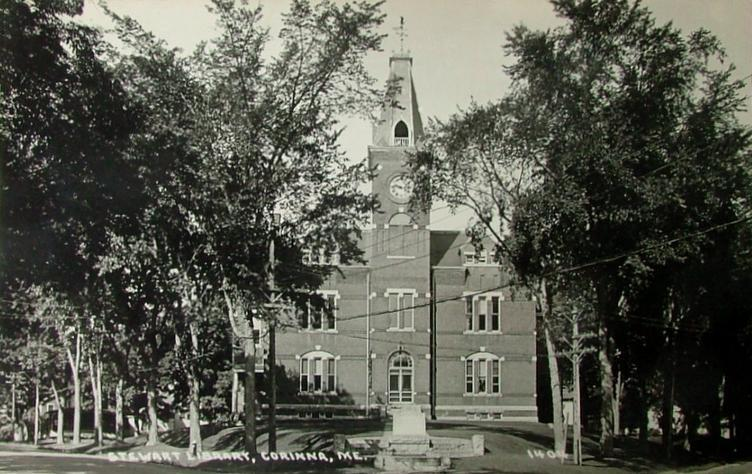
- Photo c. 1920

- Location within Maine Location within the United States
- Location: ME 11/43, Corinna, Maine
- Coordinates: 44°55′16″N 69°15′46″W
- Area: 1 acre (0.40 ha)
- Built: 1895
- Architect: Grimshaw, William Harrison
- Architectural style: Late Victorian
- NRHP reference No.: 74000190
- Added to NRHP: July 30, 1974

The Stewart Free Library is a historic municipal building at the junction of Nokomis and St. Albans Roads in Corinna, Maine. Built in 1895–1898, it is an imposing Victorian brick building of unusual sophistication for a small rural community. It presently houses the town's library and municipal offices. It was listed on the National Register of Historic Places in 1974.

== Description and history ==
The Stewart Free Library is set on the west side of Corinna's town center, on the west side of a small green formed by the junction of Nokomis Road and St. Albans Road (Maine State Route 43). It is an imposing 2 1/2-story structure of brick with granite trim, with a four-story tower rising from the center of the front (east-facing) facade. The building is symmetrically arranged, three bays wide, with gabled dormer-like projections flanking the tower on the hip roof, and a pair of tall chimneys rising at the rear of the building. The main entrance is located at the base of the tower in a round-arch opening, with a pair of narrow sash windows at the second level. The flanking bays have groups of three sash windows, those on the first floor topped by a rounded granite lintel, those on the second by a rectangular lintel.

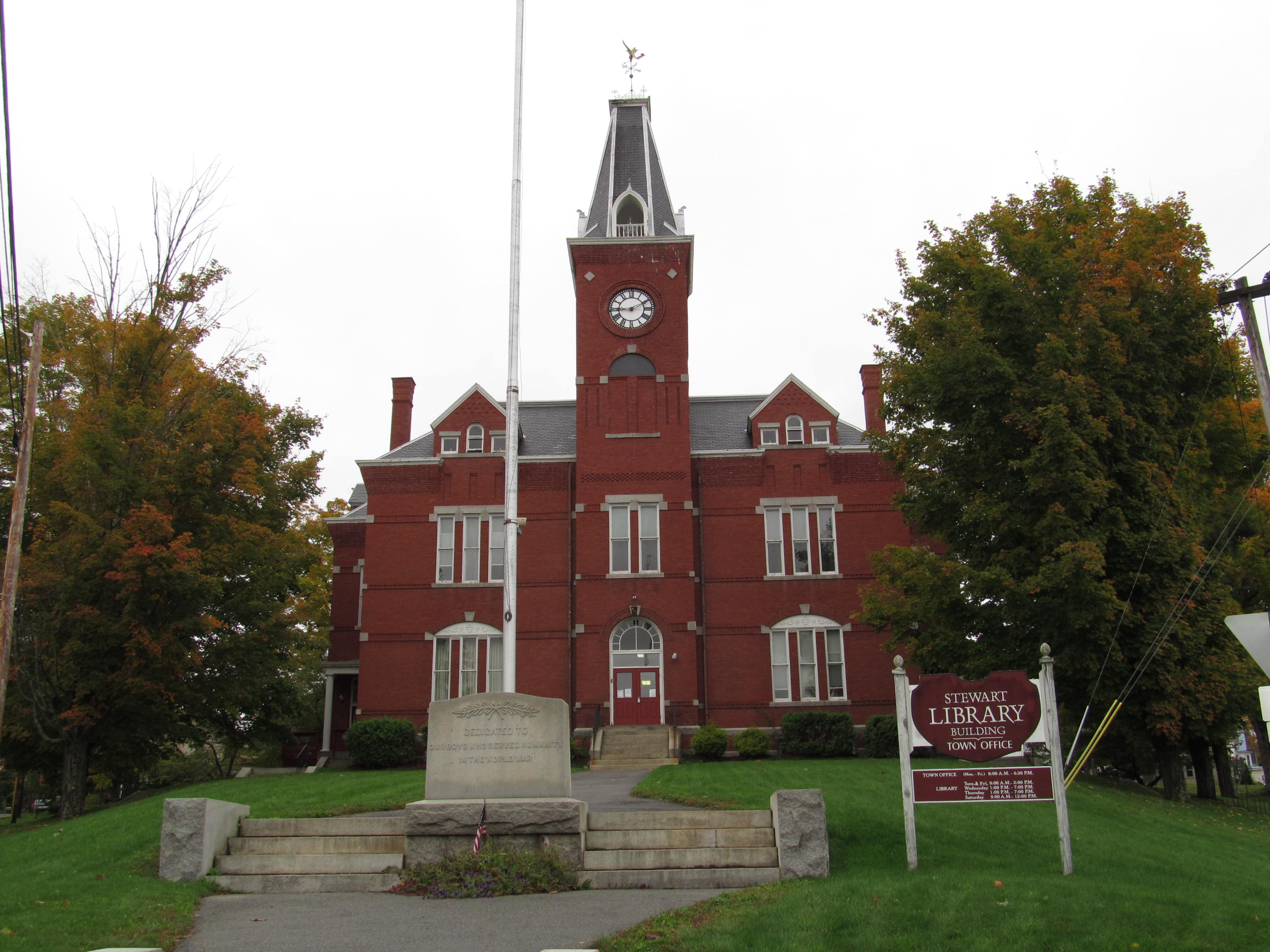
Stewart Library, 2012

The building was a gift to the community by native son Levi M. Stewart, who had amassed a fortune in business in Minnesota. Stewart retained Minneapolis architect William Harrison Grimshaw to design the building, which was built by a Bangor, Maine contractor between 1895 and 1898. At its completion it was considered to be one of the finest public buildings in the state. Stewart also donated 3,000 volumes to start the library collection, and then bequeathed his personal legal and literary collection to the library, as well as a trust fund for its maintenance. The building memorializes Stewart's parents.

== See also ==
- National Register of Historic Places listings in Penobscot County, Maine
