= Donald Briggs =

American actor (1911–1986)

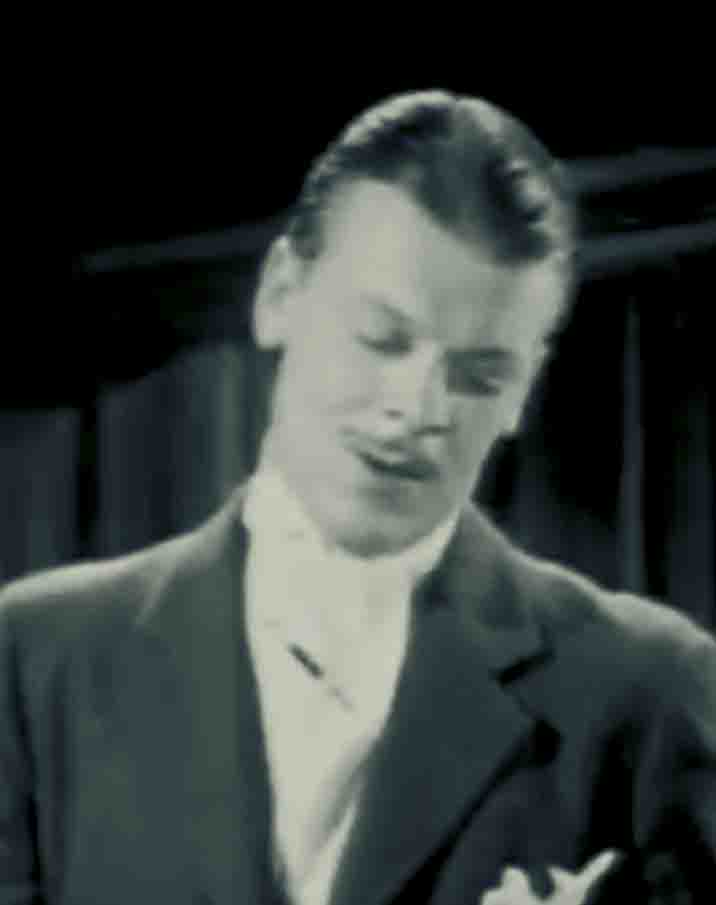
- Briggs in Fit for a King (1937)
- Born: January 28, 1911; Chicago, Illinois, U.S.
- Died: February 3, 1986 (aged 75); Woodland Hills, Los Angeles, California, U.S.
- Other names: Don Briggs
- Occupation: Actor
- Years active: 1928–1976
- Spouse(s): Audrey Christie (m. 1959)
- Children: 1

Donald Briggs (January 28, 1911 – February 3, 1986) was an American actor, who appeared in over 75 films and television shows between the 1930s and 1970s.

== Early life ==
Briggs was born in Chicago, Illinois, and died in Woodland Hills, California, at age 75. He was a graduate of Senn High School in Chicago and worked at KYW radio in 1928.

== Career ==
While Briggs was in the Army he worked with Glenn Miller, serving as his executive officer in charge of production, and he was production engineer for The Army Hour radio program.

Briggs played the title roles in The First Nighter Program, The Sheriff, Perry Mason, and The Adventures of Frank Merriwell.

== Family ==
Briggs was married to actress Audrey Christie. They had a son and a daughter. Although both of them were from Chicago, they met only when they were in a touring company of the play Without Love. After marriage, they generally maintained separate careers, only occasionally working together on television or in stock theater.

== Filmography ==
=== Film ===
Year	Title	Role	Notes
1936	The Adventures of Frank Merriwell	Frank Merriwell	Credited as Don Briggs
1936	Dangerous Waters	Quartermaster	Credited as Don Briggs
1936	Sutter's Gold	Soldier	Uncredited
1936	Love Before Breakfast	Stuart Farnum	Uncredited
1936	Show Boat	Press Agent	Uncredited
1936	After the Thin Man	Reporter	Uncredited
1937	Man of the People	Baldwin	
1937	The Good Old Soak	Fred	Uncredited
1937	Captains Courageous	Bob Tyler	
1937	They Won't Forget	Harmon	
1937	Fit for a King	Prince Michael	
1937	Submarine D-1	Underwater Escape Instructor	Uncredited
1937	All American Sweetheart	Johnny Ames	
1938	Blondes at Work	Maitland Greer	
1938	The Daredevil Drivers	Tommy Burnell	
1938	The First Hundred Years	William Regan	
1938	Love, Honor and Behave	Yale Tennis Coach	
1938	The Beloved Brat	Jerome Williams	
1938	Crime School	New Doctor	
1938	Men Are Such Fools	George Onslow	
1938	Cowboy from Brooklyn	Star Reporter	
1938	Mr. Chump	Jim Belden	
1939	Wings of the Navy	Instructor	
1939	Made for Each Other	Mr. Carter	Uncredited
1939	The Spirit of Culver	Instructor	Uncredited
1939	Whispering Enemies	Fred Bowman	
1939	The Hardys Ride High	Caleb Bowen	
1939	Ex-Champ	Jeffrey Grey	
1939	Panama Lady	Roy Harmon	
1939	Unexpected Father	Allen Rand	
1939	The Forgotten Woman	Dist. Atty. Burke	
1940	Outside the Three-Mile Limit	Jimmy Rothaker	
1940	Hot Steel	George Barnes	
1940	Men Against the Sky	Dick Allerton	
1940	Dr. Kildare Goes Home	Mr. Brownlee	
1940	Dreaming Out Loud	Will Danielson	
1963	The Wheeler Dealers	Len Flink	Credited as Don Briggs
1976	W.C. Fields and Me	Politician	Uncredited; final film role

=== Television ===
Year	Title	Role	Notes
1949	Volume One		Episode: "Number Two"
1949–1951	Suspense	Henry Lord / Mark	3 episodes; credited as Don Briggs
1949–1952	Kraft Theatre		3 episodes; credited as Don Briggs
1949–1956	Studio One	Michael / Sgt. Honey Joey / Ned Beaumont	4 episodes; credited as Don Briggs
1950	Stage 13		Episode: "No More Wishes"
1950	Pulitzer Prize Playhouse		Episode: "The Canton Story"; credited as Don Briggs
1951	Cameo Theatre		2 episodes
1951–1952	Tales of Tomorrow	Herbert Rand / Will Jethroe	2 episodes; credited as Don Briggs
1951–1954	The Web		3 episodes; credited as Don Briggs
1951–1957	Robert Montgomery Presents		3 episodes
1952	Schlitz Playhouse	Leo	Episode: "Autumn in New York"
1952	Joan of Arc		TV movie; credited as Don Briggs
1953	Lux Video Theatre	Scott Henderson	Episode: "This Is Jimmy Merrill"; credited as Don Briggs
1954	Ethel and Albert		Episode: "Episode #2.22"
1954	Treasury Men in Action		Episode: "The Case of the Tailor-Made Money"
1954	Martin Kane	Joe Mann	Episode: "The Milk Bottle Burglar"; credited as Don Briggs
1955	The Stranger		Episode: "Court of No Appeal"
1955	Captain Video and His Video Rangers	Tor	Episode: "The Swordsmen of Lyra"; credited as Don Briggs
1955	The United States Steel Hour	Truck Rogers	Episode: "Hung for a Sheep"; credited as Don Briggs
1955	I Spy	Ronge	Episode: "The Redl Story"
1955	Matinee Theatre	Stephen	Episode: "The Touchstone; credited as Don Briggs
1955	Star Tonight		2 episodes; as Don Briggs
1955–1956	The Big Story		2 episodes
1955–1960	Armstrong Circle Theatre	Tom Foley / Lewis Stidman	5 episodes; credited as Don Briggs
1956	Chevron Hall of Stars	Cameron	Episode: "Moment of Fear"
1958	Decoy	Logan	Episode: "Earthbound Satellite"; credited as Don Briggs
1959	Deadline	Sam Day / FBI Man	2 episodes; credited as Don Briggs
1961	Naked City	Jerry Bagger	Episode: "Ooftus Goofus"; credited as Don Briggs
1962	I'm Dickens, He's Fenster	Finkel	Episode: "Here's to the Three of Us"
1962–1963	The Lucy Show	Eddie Collins	7 episodes; credited as Don Briggs
1964	The Fugitive	Whit Pearson	Episode: "When the Bough Breaks"
1964	Gunsmoke	Deggers	Episode: "Hammerhead"; credited as Don Briggs
1965	Hazel	Bill Gollard	Episode: "Champagne Tony"; credited as Don Briggs
1965	The Wild Wild West	Sheriff Cantrell	Episode: "The Night of the Fatal Trap"; credited as Don Briggs
1965	My Favorite Martian	General	Episode: "Who's Got a Secret?"; credited as Don Briggs
1966	Run, Buddy, Run	Charles Druten	Episode: "The Death of Buddy Overstreet"; credited as Don Briggs
1967	Iron Horse	Marshal	Episode: "Volcano Wagon"
1967	Batman	Irving Irving	Episode: "Caught in the Spider's Den"
1968	The Felony Squad	Harold Pardway	Episode: "Man on Fire"; credited as Don Briggs
1969	Bonanza	Clint Murray	Episode: "Erin"; credited as Don Briggs
1969	Lancer	Marshal Thurman	Episode: "Angel Day and Her Sunshine Girls"; credited as Don Briggs
1970	Here's Lucy	Mr. Huntington	Episode: "Lucy the Crusader"
1972	Lassie	Major Merrill	Episode: "Peace Is Our Profession: Part 3"
1974	Run, Joe, Run	Deputy Morris	Episode: "Homecoming"
1975	Police Story	Mullins	Episode: "To Steal a Million"
