= Fit for a King =

1937 film by Edward Sedgwick

- Directed by: Edward Sedgwick
- Written by: Richard Flournoy (original screenplay)
- Produced by: David L. Loew
- Starring: Joe E. Brown; Helen Mack; Paul Kelly; Harry Davenport
- Cinematography: Paul C. Vogel
- Edited by: Jack Ogilvie
- Music by: Arthur Morton
- Distributed by: RKO Radio Pictures
- Release date: October 15, 1937
- Running time: 73 minutes
- Country: United States
- Language: English

Fit for a King is a 1937 American comedy film starring Joe E. Brown and directed by Edward Sedgwick.

== Plot ==
Newspaper reporter "Scoops" is sent out on assignment, to investigate the failed assassination attempts on Archduke Julio.

Trying to get the story, he runs into Jane Hamilton who is really Princess Helen. He doesn't realize that she is the story: a princess in exile, in danger of assassination; and, falling in love with "Scoops", while engaged to a prince.

The film ends with a wild chase and a shootout with machine guns. The question is, who will survive to tell the tale?

== Cast ==
- Joe E. Brown as Virgil Ambrose Jeremiah Christopher 'Scoop' Jones
- Helen Mack as Jane Hamilton / Princess Helen
- Paul Kelly as Briggs
- Harry Davenport as Archduke Julio
- Halliwell Hobbes as Count Strunsky
- John Qualen as Otto
- Donald Briggs as Prince Michael
- Frank Reicher as Kurtz
- Russell Hicks as Editor Hardwick
- Charles Trowbridge as Mr. Marshall
