= Tip Top Weekly =

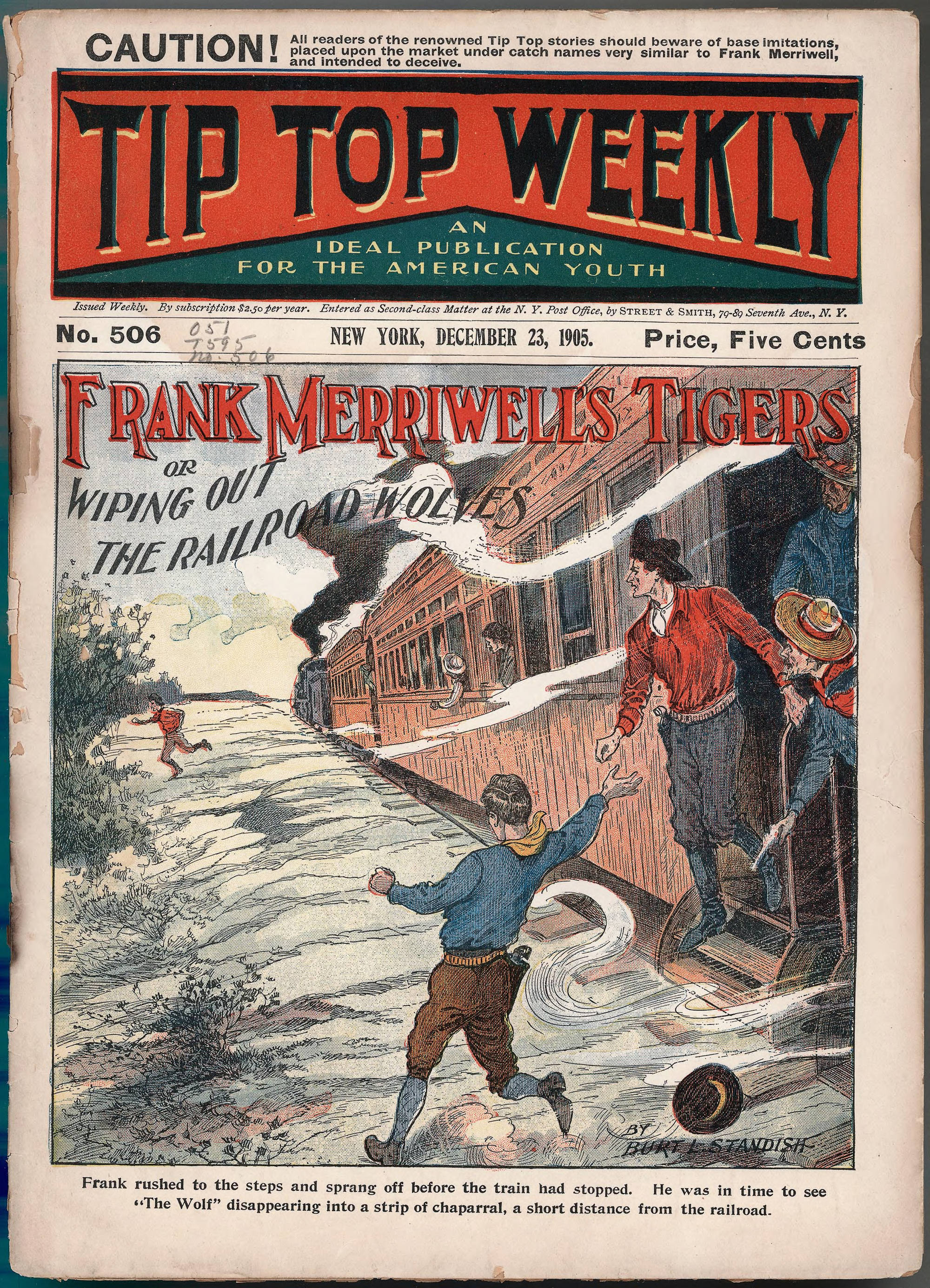
Tip Top Weekly (December 23, 1905)

Tip Top Weekly was a magazine, published by Street & Smith, which ran for more than 800 issues. It began April 19, 1896 with an August 12, 1912 title change to New Tip Top Weekly. Making a 1915 transition from a story-paper tabloid to a standard pulp magazine format, it was retitled Tip Top Semi-Monthly and then became Wide Awake Magazine from December 10, 1915 to June 10, 1916.

Promoted as "an ideal publication for American Youth," this magazine featured several fictional heroes but was mainly devoted to the ongoing adventures of student Frank Merriwell, who began at a fictional New England academy and then moved on to Yale. Adept in sports, Merriwell eventually became an international adventurer.

It was edited by Frederick Tilney from September 1896 to March 6, 1915 with William George Patten (as Gilbert Patten) taking over the editorial reins from March 10, 1915 to June 10, 1916. Patten wrote the Merriwell stories under the pseudonym Burt L. Standish.

Merriwell's adventures continued decades later as a comic book and a radio serial.
