= Frank Merriwell =

Fictional character by Gilbert Patten

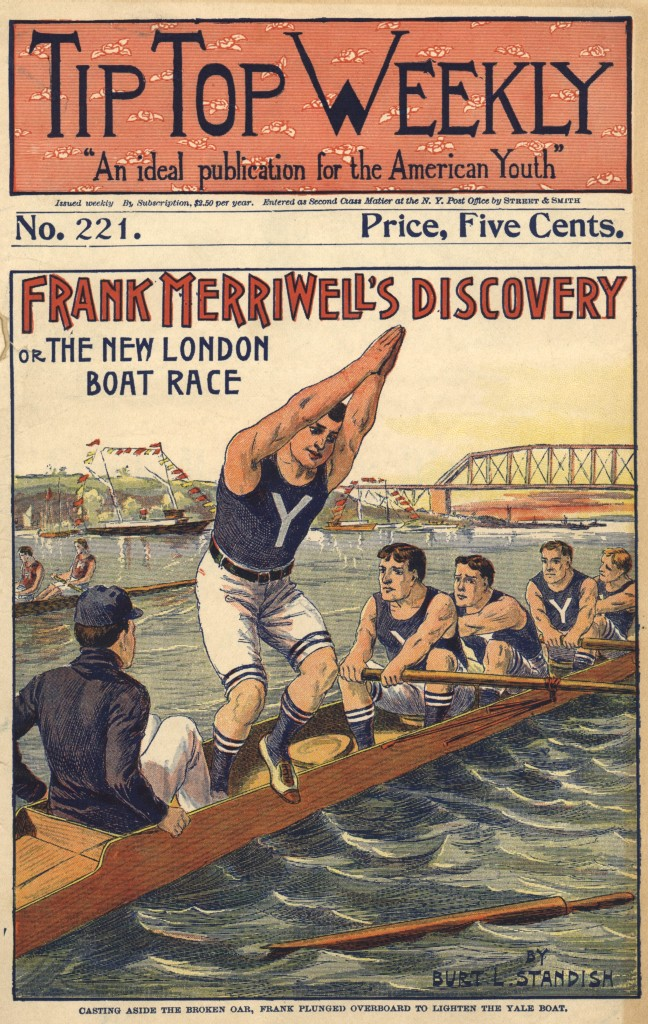
- Frank Merriwell's Discovery on the cover of Tip Top Weekly (1900)
- Created by: Gilbert Patten

In-universe information
- Gender: Male
- Nationality: American

Frank Merriwell is a fictional character appearing in a series of novels and short stories by Gilbert Patten, who wrote under the pseudonym Burt L. Standish. The character appeared in over 300 dime novels between 1896 and 1930 (some between 1927 and 1930 were written by other authors with the same pen name), numerous radio dramas in 1934 and again from 1946 through 1949, a comic strip from 1928 through 1936, a comic book (four issues) Frank Merriwell At Yale, and a 12-chapter serialized film in 1936. The book series was relaunched (with a different author) in 1965, but only three books were published.

== Character ==
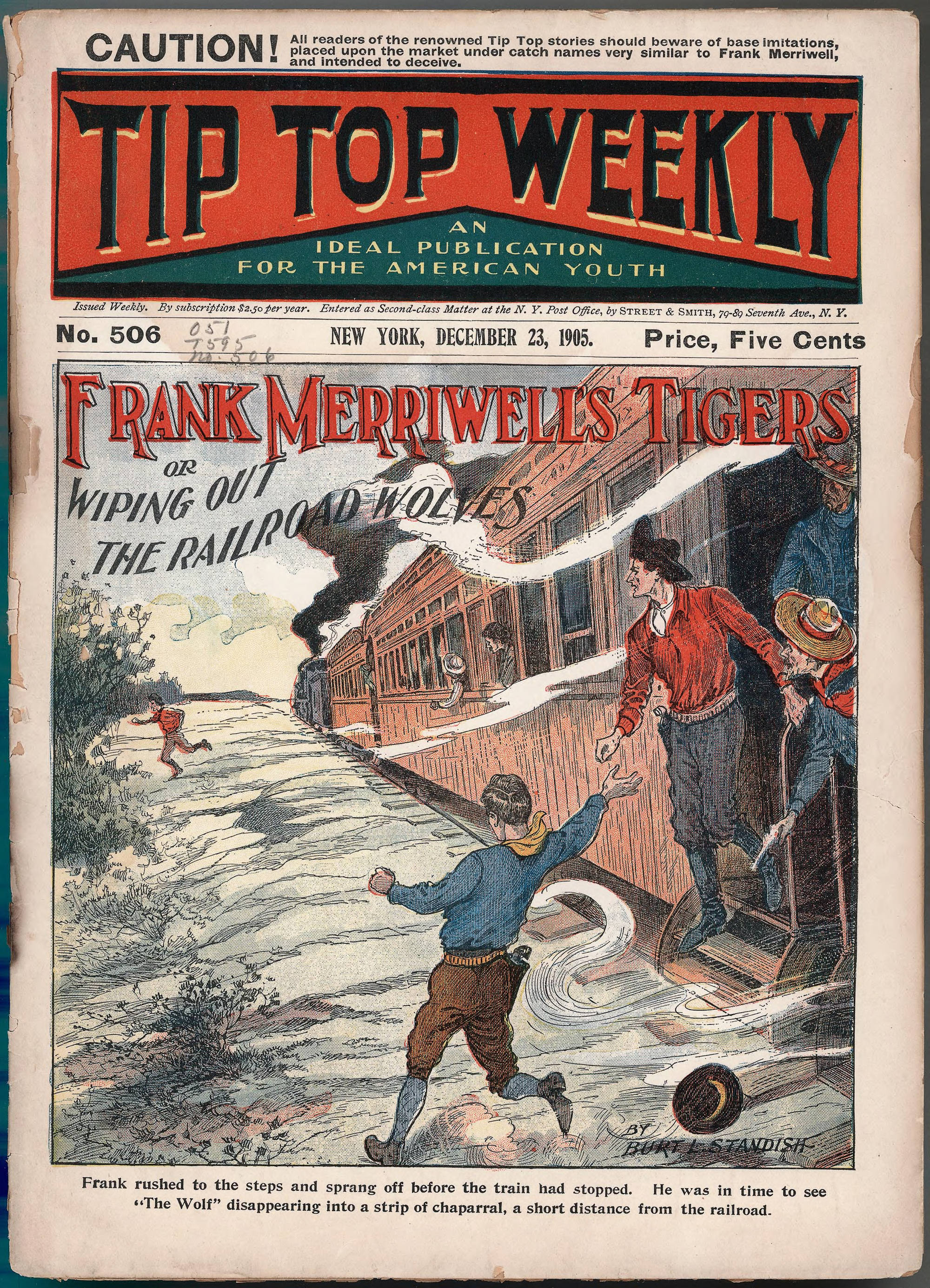
Frank Merriwell's Tigers in Tip Top Weekly (December 23, 1905)

Tip Top produced the film Frank Merriwell in Arizona; or, The Mystery of the Mine (1910)

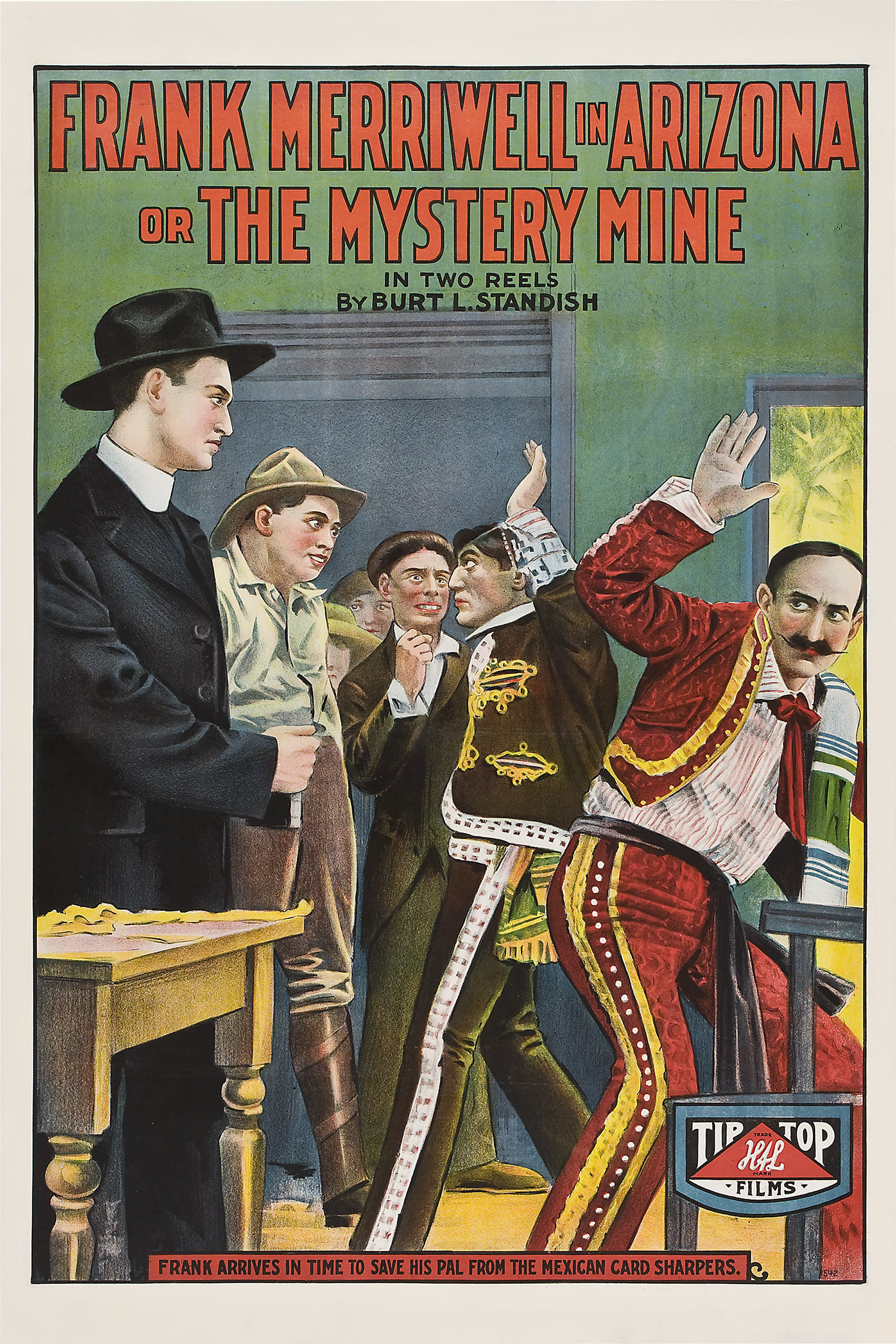
Poster for Frank Merriwell in Arizona (1910)

Frank Merriwell at Yale

A popular model for later American juvenile sports fiction, Merriwell excelled at football, baseball, basketball, crew and track at Yale while solving mysteries and righting wrongs. He played with great strength and received traumatic blows without injury.

A biographical entry on Patten noted dryly that Frank Merriwell "had little in common with his creator or his readers." Patten offered some background on his character: "The name was symbolic of the chief characteristics I desired my hero to have. Frank for frankness, merry for a happy disposition, well for health and abounding vitality."

Merriwell's classmates observed, "He never drinks. That's how he keeps himself in such fine condition all the time. He will not smoke, either, and he takes his exercise regularly. He is really a remarkable freshie." American Olympic champion boxer and bobsledder Eddie Eagan commented in his autobiography: "To this day I have never used tobacco, because Frank Merriwell didn't. My first glass of wine, which I do not care for, was taken under social compulsion in Europe. Frank never drank."

Merriwell originally appeared in a series of magazine stories starting April 18, 1896 ("Frank Merriwell: or, First Days at Fardale") in Tip Top Weekly, continuing through 1912, and later in dime novels and comic books. Patten would confine himself to a hotel room for a week to write an entire story.

The Frank Merriwell comic strip began in 1928, continuing until 1936. Daily strips from 1934 provided illustrations for the 1937 Big Little Book.

There are at least two generations of Merriwells: Frank, his half-brother Dick, and Frank's son, Frank Jr. There is a marked difference between Frank and Dick. Frank usually handles challenges on his own. Dick has mysterious friends and skills that help him, especially an old Indian friend without whom the stories would not be quite as interesting.

It is believed that Merriwell was based on Native American baseball player, Louis Sockalexis.

== Syndicated comic strips ==
The McClure Newspaper Syndicate distributed Young Frank Merriwell, written by Patten and illustrated by John Hix; it debuted on March 26, 1928, and ran for six months. The comic strip was resurrected in July 1931 as Frank Merriwell's Schooldays (this time syndicated by the Central Press Association and illustrated by Jack Wilhelm) and ran for three years.

== Radio ==
The Adventures of Frank Merriwell first ran on NBC radio from March 26 to June 22, 1934, as a 15-minute serial airing three times a week at 5:30pm. Sponsored by Dr. West's Toothpaste, this program starred Donald Briggs in the title role. Harlow Wilcox was the announcer.

After a 12-year gap, the series returned October 5, 1946, as a 30-minute Saturday morning show on NBC, continuing until June 4, 1949. Lawson Zerbe starred as Merriwell, Jean Gillespie and Elaine Rostas as Inza Burrage, Harold Studer as Bart Hodge and Patricia Hosley as Elsie Belwood. Announcers were Tex Antoine, Mel Brandt and Harlow Wilcox, and the Paul Taubman Orchestra supplied the background music.

Yale's alma mater, "Bright College Years", was the theme song.

== Film ==
A film serial entitled The Adventures of Frank Merriwell was created by Universal Studios in 1936.

== Broadway ==
A Broadway musical called Frank Merriwell, or Honor Unchallenged, opened at the Longacre Theatre on April 24, 1971. It closed after one performance.

== 1965 relaunch ==
In 1965, a new book series was launched by author Mike Frederic, with cover tagline "The thrilling sequel to the all-time best-selling American sports series." Only three books were published: Frank Merriwell Returns (baseball theme, 1965), Frank Merriwell Quarterback (American football theme, 1965), and Frank Merriwell At The Wheel (sports car racing theme, 1967).

== Book titles ==
Title	Series #	Project Gutenberg #
Dick Merriwell a Winner	178	
Dick Merriwell Abroad	118	#41827
Dick Merriwell Adrift	154	
Dick Merriwell and June Arlington	234	
Dick Merriwell and The Burglar	236	
Dick Merriwell at Fardale	76	
Dick Merriwell at the County Fair	179	
Dick Merriwell at the Olympics	212	
Dick Merriwell Doubted	164	
Dick Merriwell Freshman	142	
Dick Merriwell Game to the Last	186	
Dick Merriwell in Panama	206	
Dick Merriwell in South America	207	
Dick Merriwell in the Wilds	167	
Dick Merriwell Motor King	187	
Dick Merriwell on the Gridiron	102	
Dick Merriwell the Wizard	126	
Dick Merriwell Universal Coach	209	
Dick Merriwell's Ability	90	
Dick Merriwell's Aero Dash	189	#64407
Dick Merriwell's Assurance	109	#61830
Dick Merriwell's Backers	149	#62930
Dick Merriwell's Backstop	96	
Dick Merriwell's Best Work	150	
Dick Merriwell's Black Star	158	
Dick Merriwell's Charm	241	
Dick Merriwell's Cleverness	124	
Dick Merriwell's Close Call	156	
Dick Merriwell's Commencement	200	
Dick Merriwell's Coolness	202	
Dick Merriwell's Counsel	208	
Dick Merriwell's Dare	136	
Dick Merriwell's Dash	89	
Dick Merriwell's Day	114	#61174
Dick Merriwell's Debt	152	
Dick Merriwell's Decision	201	
Dick Merriwell's Defense	92	
Dick Merriwell's Delivery	84	
Dick Merriwell's Detective Work	199	
Dick Merriwell's Diamond	87	
Dick Merriwell's Disguise	103	
Dick Merriwell's Distrust	151	
Dick Merriwell's Downfall	116	
Dick Merriwell's Example	166	
Dick Merriwell's Fighting Chance	192	#63024
Dick Merriwell's Five	130	
Dick Merriwell's Glory	77	62411
Dick Merriwell's Grit	108	
Dick Merriwell's Heroic Players	211	#63608
Dick Merriwell's Home Run	135	
Dick Merriwell's Honors	173	
Dick Merriwell's Influence	141	
Dick Merriwell's Intuition	190	
Dick Merriwell's Joke	144	
Dick Merriwell's Long Slide	110	
Dick Merriwell's Magnetism	148	
Dick Merriwell's Marked Money	100	
Dick Merriwell's Mastery	153	
Dick Merriwell's Model	93	
Dick Merriwell's Mystery	94	
Dick Merriwell's Narrow Escape	80	
Dick Merriwell's Perception	198	
Dick Merriwell's Persistence	113	
Dick Merriwell's Placer Find	191	
Dick Merriwell's Polo Team	132	
Dick Merriwell's Power	181	
Dick Merriwell's Pranks	120	#41879
Dick Merriwell's Promise	78	
Dick Merriwell's Race	175	
Dick Merriwell's Racket	81	
Dick Merriwell's Regret	147	
Dick Merriwell's Reliance	203	
Dick Merriwell's Reputation	171	
Dick Merriwell's Rescue	79	
Dick Merriwell's Resource	129	
Dick Merriwell's Return	128	
Dick Merriwell's Revenge	82	
Dick Merriwell's Ruse	83	
Dick Merriwell's Stanchness	161	
Dick Merriwell's Stand	163	
Dick Merriwell's Star Play	176	
Dick Merriwell's Staying Power	143	
Dick Merriwell's Stroke	127	
Dick Merriwell's Team Mate	138	
Dick Merriwell's Test	104	
Dick Merriwell's Threat	112	
Dick Merriwell's Trap	91	#41866
Dick Merriwell's Tussle	188	
Dick Merriwell's Varsity Nine	210	
Dick Merriwell's Way	169	
Dick Merriwell's Western Mission	97	
Dick Merriwell's Wonders	85	
Frank Merriwell As Coach	72	
Frank Merriwell at Phantom Lake	177	
Frank Merriwell at the Cowboy Carnival	237	
Frank Merriwell at Yale	9	#11115
Frank Merriwell Down South	5	#22424
Frank Merriwell Facing His Foes	160	
Frank Merriwell in Camp	24	
Frank Merriwell in England	44	
Frank Merriwell in Europe	8	#67901
Frank Merriwell in Kentucky	63	
Frank Merriwell in Maine	28	#61535
Frank Merriwell in Peru	182	
Frank Merriwell in the Rockies	119	
Frank Merriwell in The Yellowstone	243	
Frank Merriwell in Wall Street	159	
Frank Merriwell Jr and The Talking Head	245	
Frank Merriwell Jr at The Old School	228	
Frank Merriwell Jr Birdman	227	
Frank Merriwell Jr in Arizona	217	#61349
Frank Merriwell Jr in the Desert	221	
Frank Merriwell Jr On The Border	231	
Frank Merriwell Jr Tested	213	
Frank Merriwell Jr's Athletic Team	224	
Frank Merriwell Jr's Conquests	214	
Frank Merriwell Jr's Cross-Country Run	238	
Frank Merriwell Jr's Fardale Visit	242	
Frank Merriwell Jr's Fight For Right	222	
Frank Merriwell Jr's Gridiron Honors	230	
Frank Merriwell Jr's Helping Hand	216	#62421
Frank Merriwell Jr's Ice-boat Adventure	219	
Frank Merriwell Jr's Indian entanglement	239	
Frank Merriwell Jr's Mission	218	
Frank Merriwell Jr's Ordeal	226	
Frank Merriwell Jr's Peck of Trouble	225	
Frank Merriwell Jr's Repentant Enemy	229	
Frank Merriwell Jr's Rivals	215	
Frank Merriwell Jr's Team Work	223	
Frank Merriwell Jr's Timely Aid	220	
Frank Merriwell Jr's Yacht Victory	244	
Frank Merriwell on the Boulevards	45	#63752
Frank Merriwell on the Road	34	#63815
Frank Merriwell on Top	55	
Frank Merriwell the Lionhearted	196	
Frank Merriwell Wins An Enemy	240	
Frank Merriwell's Air Voyage	157	
Frank Merriwell's Alarm	16	#38429
Frank Merriwell's Athletes	17	#41996
Frank Merriwell's Auto	50	
Frank Merriwell's Backers	95	#39433
Frank Merriwell's Baseball Victories	48	
Frank Merriwell's Bicycle Tour	13	
Frank Merriwell's Bravery	6	#22571
Frank Merriwell's Brother	73	#71945
Frank Merriwell's Challengers	122	
Frank Merriwell's Champions	19	#42049
Frank Merriwell's Chase	27	#63483
Frank Merriwell's Chums	2	#19502
Frank Merriwell's Club	68	
Frank Merriwell's College Chums	37	
Frank Merriwell's Confidence	49	
Frank Merriwell's Courage	14	
Frank Merriwell's Cruise	26	#22265
Frank Merriwell's Danger	22	#73850
Frank Merriwell's Daring	15	
Frank Merriwell's Diamond Foes	232	#60463
Frank Merriwell's Double Shot	47	
Frank Merriwell's Duel	46	
Frank Merriwell's Encounter	99	
Frank Merriwell's Encouragement	172	
Frank Merriwell's Endurance	123	#56278
Frank Merriwell's Faith	60	
Frank Merriwell's False Friend	70	#61853
Frank Merriwell's Fame	36	
Frank Merriwell's First Job	30	#64635
Frank Merriwell's Foes	3	
Frank Merriwell's Fortune	39	
Frank Merriwell's Fun	51	#63537
Frank Merriwell's Generosity	52	
Frank Merriwell's Great Scheme	43	
Frank Merriwell's Grit	180	
Frank Merriwell's Happy Camp	140	
Frank Merriwell's Hard Case	162	
Frank Merriwell's Hard Luck	32	
Frank Merriwell's Honor	86	
Frank Merriwell's Horse	146	
Frank Merriwell's Hunting Tour	7	
Frank Merriwell's Iron Nerve	62	
Frank Merriwell's Lads	205	
Frank Merriwell's Leaguers	139	
Frank Merriwell's Lesson	170	
Frank Merriwell's Long Chance	183	
Frank Merriwell's Loyalty	23	
Frank Merriwell's Luck	56	
Frank Merriwell's Marriage	125	#62072
Frank Merriwell's Marvel	74	
Frank Merriwell's Mascot	57	
Frank Merriwell's Mystery	195	
Frank Merriwell's New Boy	134	
Frank Merriwell's New Comedian	40	#38610
Frank Merriwell's Nomads	101	
Frank Merriwell's Old Form	184	
Frank Merriwell's Opportunity	31	
Frank Merriwell's Own Company	35	#64123
Frank Merriwell's Party	12	
Frank Merriwell's Peril	115	
Frank Merriwell's Phantom	59	
Frank Merriwell's Power	64	
Frank Merriwell's Pride	121	
Frank Merriwell's Problem	38	
Frank Merriwell's Prosperity	41	#64347
Frank Merriwell's ProtÃ©gÃ©	33	
Frank Merriwell's Pupils	133	
Frank Merriwell's Pursuit	117	#22874
Frank Merriwell's Puzzle	194	
Frank Merriwell's Races	11	#21958
Frank Merriwell's Ranch	168	
Frank Merriwell's Rescue	98	
Frank Merriwell's Return to Yale	20	#35127
Frank Merriwell's Reward	58	#19402
Frank Merriwell's Rough Deal	111	
Frank Merriwell's School Days	1	
Frank Merriwell's Search	67	
Frank Merriwell's Secret	21	
Frank Merriwell's Set Back	66	#62829
Frank Merriwell's Shrewdness	65	
Frank Merriwell's Skill	18	
Frank Merriwell's Son	137	#25316
Frank Merriwell's Sports Afield	10	
Frank Merriwell's Stage Hit	42	
Frank Merriwell's Steadying Hand	165	
Frank Merriwell's Strategy	106	
Frank Merriwell's Strong Arm	71	#61558
Frank Merriwell's Struggle	29	
Frank Merriwell's Support	75	#62719
Frank Merriwell's Tact	193	
Frank Merriwell's Talisman	145	
Frank Merriwell's Temptation	54	
Frank Merriwell's Tenacity	197	
Frank Merriwell's Tigers	131	
Frank Merriwell's Treasure Hunt	185	
Frank Merriwell's Tricks	53	
Frank Merriwell's Trip West	4	
Frank Merriwell's Triumph	107	#40262
Frank Merriwell's Trump Card	105	
Frank Merriwell's Trust	69	
Frank Merriwell's Vacation	25	
Frank Merriwell's Victories	61	
Frank Merriwell's Winners	88	
Frank Merriwell's Wizard	174	
Frank Merriwell's Worst Boy	155	
Frank Merriwell's Young Warriors	204	
Merriwell vs Merriwell	235	
The Merriwell Company	233	

== Listen to ==
- The Adventures of Frank Merriwell in the Internet Archive's Old-Time Radio Collection
- Zoot Radio, free old time radio show downloads of 'Frank Merriwell'
