= The Adventures of Frank Merriwell (serial) =

1936 film

- Directed by: Clifford Smith (as Cliff Smith); Lew Landers (uncredited)
- Written by: George H. Plympton; Ella O'Neill
- Starring: Donald Briggs
- Distributed by: Universal Pictures
- Release date: 1936
- Running time: 12 chapters (219 min)
- Country: United States
- Language: English

The Adventures of Frank Merriwell (1936) is a Universal movie serial based on the Frank Merriwell books by Gilbert Patten.

== Plot ==
College sports hero Frank Meriwell leaves school before an impending decisive baseball game to track down his missing father and locate a fabulous lost treasure.

== Cast ==
- Don Briggs as Frank Merriwell
- Jean Rogers as Elsie Belwood
- John King as Bruce Browning
- Bentley Hewett as Daggett
- House Peters Jr. as House Peters
- Carla Laemmle as Carla
- Sumner Getchell as Harry
- Wallace Reid Jr. as Wally
- Herschel Mayall Jr. as Herschel
- Al Bridge as Henchman Black
- Dick Wessell as Henchman Joe
- Bud Osborne as Henchman Gorman
- Ed Cobb as Henchman Pete
- Sam McDaniel as Servant Jeff
- Walter Law as Mr. Belwood
- Ella Ethridge as Mrs. Merriwell
- William P. Carlton as Mr. Merriwell

== Production ==
The Adventures of Frank Merriwell is set in 1936 instead of the 1890s of the source material.

Universal combined several stories by Burt Standish to make this film.

== Chapter titles ==
1. College Hero
2. The Death Plunge
3. Death at the Crossroads
4. Wreck of the Viking
5. Capsized in the Cataract
6. Descending Doom
7. Monster of the Deep
8. The Tragic Victory
9. Between Savage Foes
10. Imprisoned in a Dungeon
11. The Crash in the Chasm
12. The Winning Play

_{Source:}

== See also ==
- List of American films of 1936
- List of film serials by year
- List of film serials by studio

Preceded by Tailspin Tommy in the Great Air Mystery (1935)	Universal Serial; The Adventures of Frank Merriwell (1936)	Succeeded by Flash Gordon (1936)
