= Grenville C. Emery =

Founder of Harvard-Westlake School

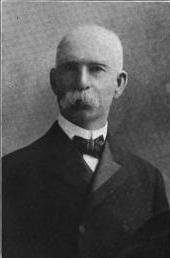
Grenville C. Emery

Grenville C. Emery (July 19, 1843 – May 9, 1927) was an educator, author, head master and founder of what is now the Harvard-Westlake School in Los Angeles, California.

== Biography ==
Emery was born July 19, 1843, in Ripley, Maine, to John G. Emery and Mary Stanley (Jones) Emery, both of whom were of English "Yankee" heritage. Emery's birthname was "John G. Emery". Emery's father had sailed to California from Maine during the Gold Rush of 1849, but returned to New England to engage in various businesses including the construction of a railroad to Lewiston. Emery married Ella Rhoda Pike on January 27, 1871, in Livermore Falls, Maine, and they had seven children.

As a child, Emery first attended the public schools in Maine and then Corinna Union Academy. Then he attended the Maine State Seminary from 1861 to 1864 and Bates College in Lewiston, Maine, from 1864 to 1868, where he received A. B. and A. M. degrees in 1869 and an honorary Litt. D. in 1904. Emery studied in Göttingen, Germany, from 1882 to 1883.

After graduation from Bates, Emery was selected as an instructor at the Maine State Seminary, teaching from 1868 to 1869, until he was appointed principal of Auburn High School and superintendent of the schools in Auburn, Maine, in 1870. From 1871 to 1872 he served as principal of the Grand Rapids High School in Grand Rapids, Michigan. He then returned to New England to serve as sub-master at the Lawrence Grammar School in Boston, Massachusetts, until 1881 when he left to study in Germany. After studying in Europe, Emery returned to become master of the Boston Latin School, serving there until 1897. Emery also authored various mathematics textbooks.

In 1897, Emery moved to Los Angeles, and in 1899 he became principal of the Los Angeles Military Academy. In 1900 Emery founded and became Head Master of the Harvard School in Los Angeles and instituted military drilling. In 1911 Emery transferred control of the school to the Episcopal Church. In 1920 Emery moved to Palo Alto, California, near Stanford University, where he founded the Seale Academy, which was renamed the West Coast Military Academy. The school later merged with another and is now known as the Harker School.

Mrs. Ella Emery died on December 22, 1913, in Los Angeles, and Emery remarried on December 22, 1920, to Katherine D. Monroe. Emery was a member of the Congregational Church.

Grenville C. Emery died in Palo Alto on May 9, 1927.
