= Emerson Bell (artist) =

American artist and jazz musician

Emerson Nathaniel Bell (1930 – April 13, 2006) was 20th-century American artist and jazz musician. For most of his life, he was a resident of Baton Rouge, Louisiana. He studied sculpture under Frank Hayden, who studied under the Croatian sculptor Ivan Meštrović. He was the first National Endowment for the Arts artist-in-residence to teach in the East Baton Rouge Parish school system. Bell's work is in the permanent collection of many galleries, private collections, and museums; including the LSU Museum of Art and New Orleans Museum of Art.
