= Harvard-Westlake School =

Middle and secondary school in Los Angeles, California, United States

- Los Angeles County, California; United States

Information
- Type: Independent, day, college preparatory
- Motto: Possunt Quia Posse Videntur (They can because they think they can)
- Religious affiliation: Nonsectarian
- Established: Harvard School for Boys: 1900; 126 years ago Westlake School for Girls: 1904; 122 years ago Fully Merged as Harvard-Westlake: 1991; 35 years ago
- Founder: Grenville C. Emery
- President: Richard B. Commons
- Headmaster: Laura D. Ross
- Teaching staff: 212.0 (FTE) (2015–16)
- Grades: 7–12
- Gender: Co-educational
- Enrollment: 1,598 (2015–16)
- Student to teacher ratio: 7.5∶1 (2015–16)
- Campus: Large City
- Colors: Red; Black; White
- Athletics conference: CIF Southern Section; Mission League
- Nickname: Wolverines
- Accreditation: WASC, NAIS, CAIS
- 2013 SAT average: 688 verbal/critical reading 703 math 707 writing
- Newspaper: The Chronicle
- Yearbook: Vox Populi
- Endowment: $148 million (2022)
- School fees: New students: $2,500; Bus service (optional): $3,800–4,000; Books, meals, activities: $2,500–3,500
- Tuition: $54,900 (2026–27)
- Website: www.hw.com

Middle School

Location
- 700 North Faring Road; Los Angeles, California; United States

Information
- Grades: 7–9
- Enrollment: 727 (2015–16)
- Campus size: 12 acres (49,000 m^{2})
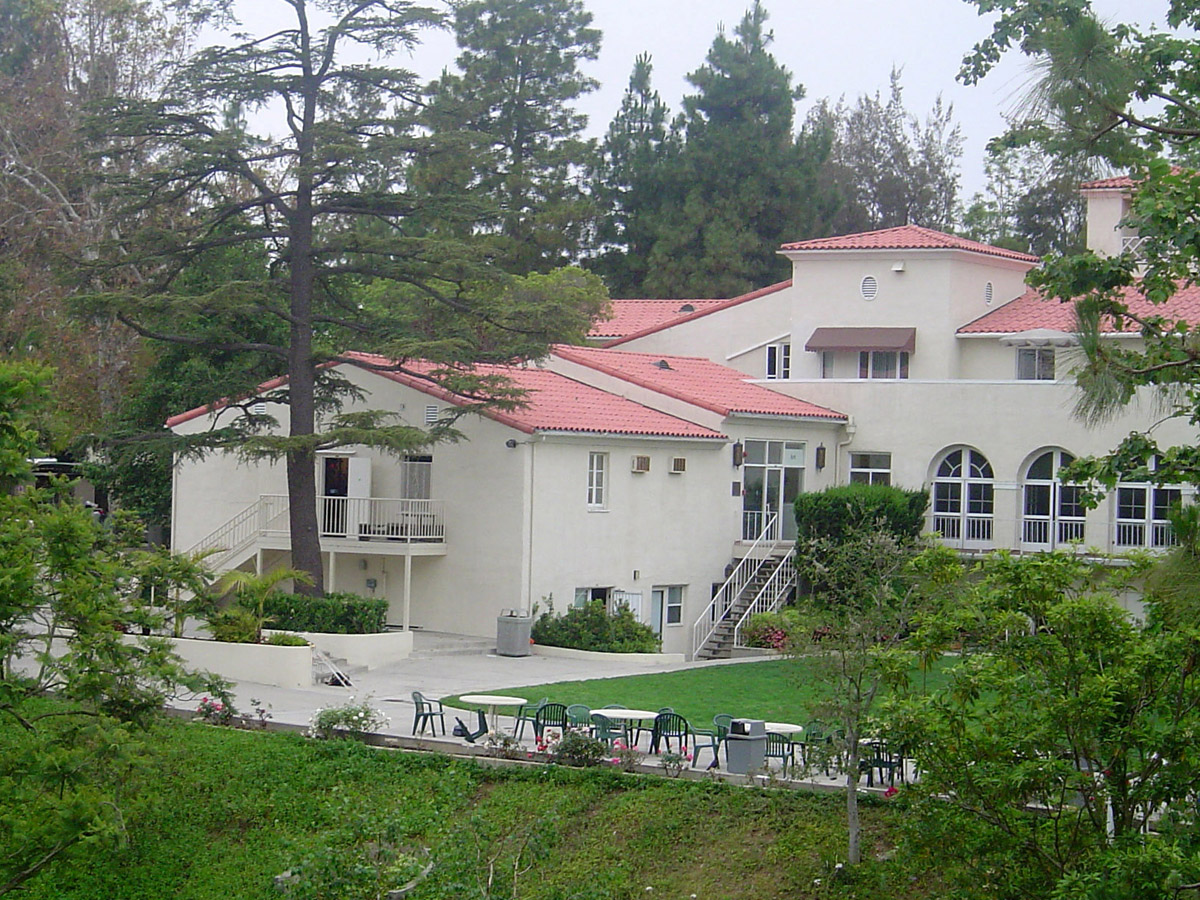
- The former Administration Building, Middle School (demolished summer 2008)

Upper School

Location
- 3700 Coldwater Canyon Avenue; Studio City, California; United States

Information
- Grades: 10–12
- Enrollment: 871 (2015–16)
- Campus size: 22 acres (89,000 m^{2})
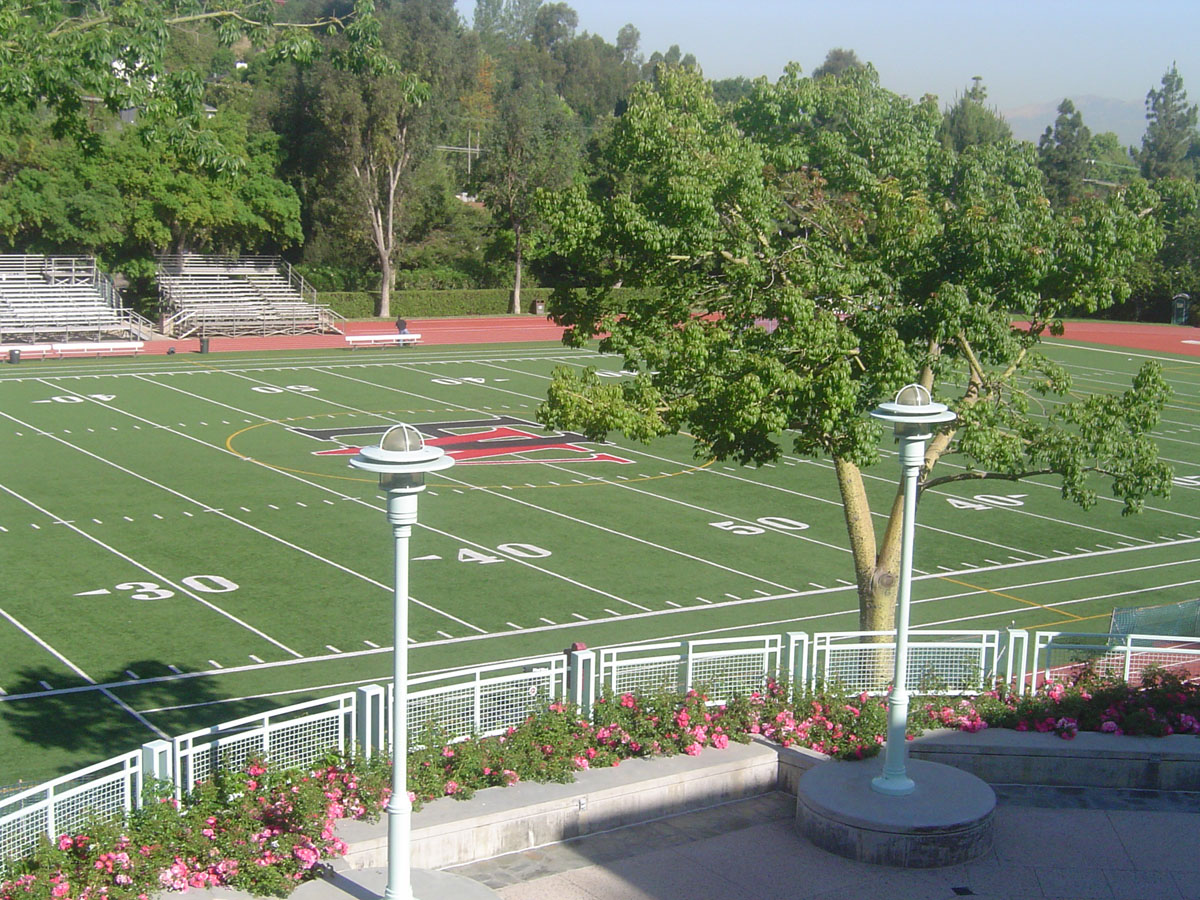
- Ted Slavin Field, Upper School

Harvard-Westlake School is an independent, co-educational university preparatory day school in Los Angeles, California, with about 1,600 students in grades seven through twelve. The school has two campuses: the middle school campus in Holmby Hills and the high school (the "Upper School") in Studio City. It was previously a member of the G30 Schools group. It is not affiliated with Harvard University. The school has been recognized by The Schools Index as one of the top 150 schools in the world and among the top 20 in North America.

== History ==
=== Harvard School for Boys ===
The Harvard School for Boys was established in 1900 by Grenville C. Emery as a military academy on the site of a barley field at the corner of Western Avenue and Sixteenth Street (now Venice Boulevard) in Los Angeles. Emery was originally from Boston, and he asked Harvard University for permission to use its name for his secondary school; it was granted by university president Charles W. Eliot. In 1911, it secured endorsement from the Episcopal Church and became a nonprofit; in 1937, the school moved to its campus at the former Hollywood Country Club on Coldwater Canyon in Studio City after receiving a $25,000 ($560,000 today) loan from aviation pioneer Donald Douglas. In the late 1960s and early 1970s, the Harvard School gradually discontinued both boarding and its standing as a military academy, while expanding its enrollment, courses, classes, teachers, and curriculum.

=== Westlake School for Girls ===
The Westlake School for Girls was established in 1904 by Jessica Smith Vance and Frederica de Laguna in what is now downtown Los Angeles, California, as an exclusively female institution offering elementary and secondary education. It was named for nearby Westlake Park, now known as MacArthur Park. At the time, the school was a for-profit alternative to the older non-profit Marlborough School.

In 1927, it moved to its current campus on North Faring Road in Holmby Hills, California. The school was purchased by Sydney Temple, whose daughter, Helen Temple Dickinson, was headmistress until 1966, when Westlake became a non-profit institution. The Temple family owned the school until 1977, with Dickinson serving in an ex officio capacity. In 1968, Westlake became exclusively a secondary school.

Charlotte Rae and producers Norman Lear and Jerry Mayer, visited to Westlake in late 1978 to research life at a girls boarding school ahead of filming the pilot for The Facts of Life. Mindy Cohn was assigned by the staff to show them around the school. Her natural comic skills impressed them sufficiently to create the character of Natalie, named for a childhood friend of Rae. With her mother's permission Cohn, who had not acted previously, was cast on the show.

=== Merger ===
As both schools continued to grow in the late 1980s, and as the schools' reputations and desirability depended less on gender exclusivity, the trustees of both Harvard and Westlake agreed to a merger in 1989. The two institutions had long been de facto sister schools and interacted socially. Highly controversial at the time, complete integration and coeducation began in the fall of 1991.

=== Cheating scandal ===
In 2008, six sophomores were expelled and more than a dozen other students faced suspensions for cheating.

== Campuses ==
The school is split between two campuses: grades 7–9, the Middle School, at the former Westlake campus in Holmby Hills and grades 10–12, the Upper School, at the former Harvard campus in Studio City.

A four-year renovation of the Middle School campus, completed in September 2008, replaced the administration building, the library, and the instrumental music building with a new library, science center, and administration office. The project also added the Bing Performing Arts Center, which has a two-level, 800-seat theater, a black box theater, and a dance studio.

Buildings on the Upper School campus include: the Munger Science Center and computer lab; the Rugby building which houses the English department, 300-seat theater, costume shop, and drama lab; the Seaver building, home to the foreign language and history departments as well as administrative offices and the visitor lobby; Chalmers, which houses the performing arts and math departments, book store, cafeteria, sandwich window, and student lounge; Kutler, which houses the Brendan Kutler Center for Interdisciplinary Studies and Independent Research and the Feldman-Horn visual arts studios, dark room, video labs, and gallery.

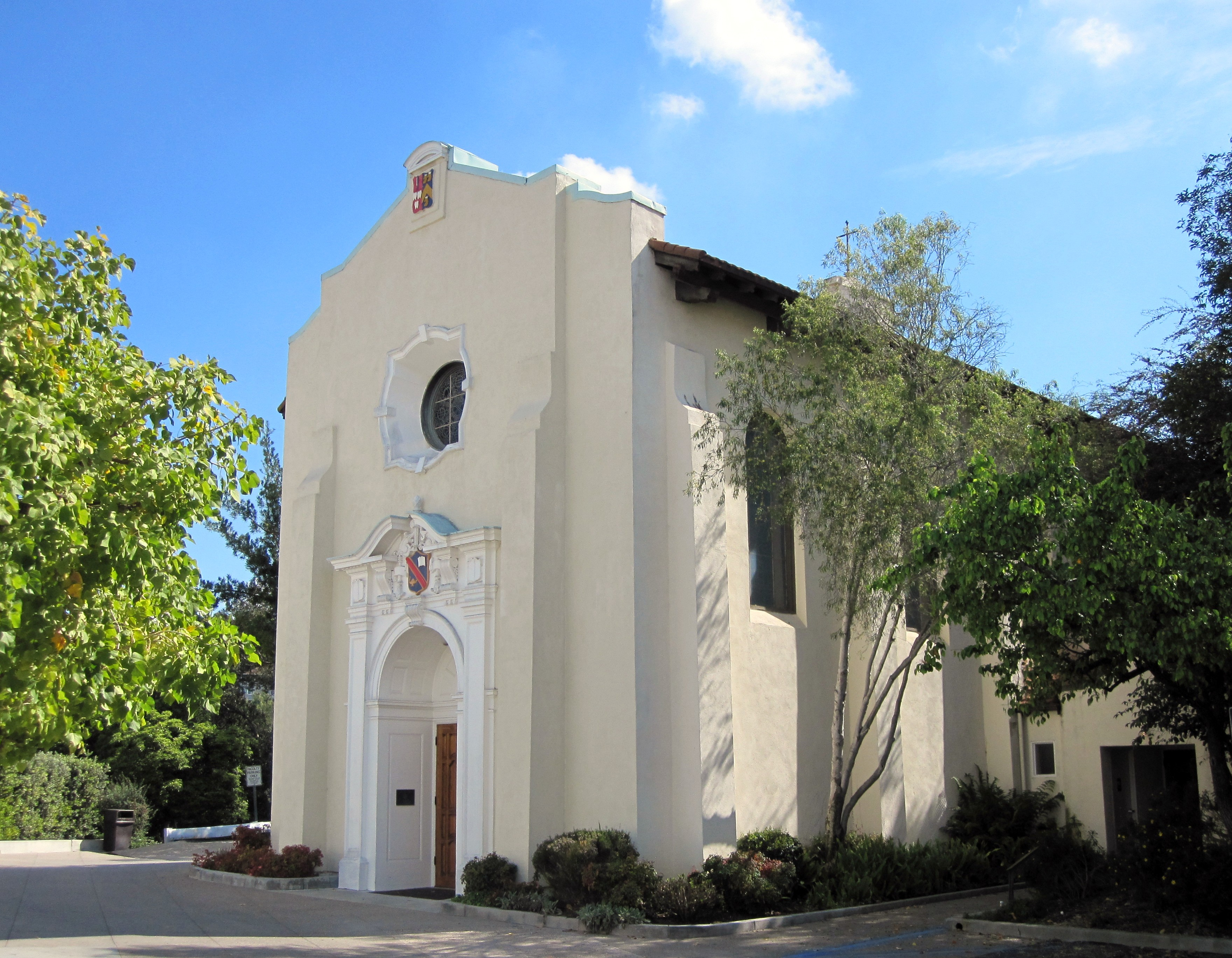
Saint Saviour's Chapel

The athletic facilities include Taper Gymnasium, used for volleyball and basketball as well as final exams; Hamilton Gymnasium, the older gymnasium still used for team practices and final exams; Copses Family Pool, an Olympic-size facility; and Ted Slavin Field for football, soccer, track & field, lacrosse, and field hockey. The school also maintains an off-campus baseball facility, the O'Malley Family Field, in Encino, California.

The Upper School campus has the three-story Seeley G. Mudd Library, renovated in summer 2023, and Saint Saviour's Chapel, a vestige from the days of Harvard School for Boys' Episcopal.

In 2017, Harvard Westlake spent more than $40 million to buy Weddington Golf & Tennis, a 16-acre country club located less than a mile from the Upper School campus, with plans to build an athletics center on the location.

Tuition for the 2024–2025 school year is $49,700, with a new student fee of $2,500. Other expenses—which include books, meals, and class activities—typically average $2,500 to $3,500—with an additional $3,000 to $3,600 for those who take advantage of the school's comprehensive bus service.

Harvard-Westlake provided $14 million in financial aid in 2023. That year, about 20% of the student body received financial aid, which averaged $33,500 for each student that received financial aid.

== Academic achievement ==
For the HW Class of 2019, average SATs were 716 (verbal) and 745 (math). Among the 292 seniors, there were 27 National Merit Semifinalists. For the 2019–2020 school year, Niche ranked Harvard-Westlake the best private high school in Los Angeles, the 2nd-best private high school in California, and the 6th-best private school in the United States.

== Athletics ==
Harvard-Westlake fields 22 varsity teams in the California Interscholastic Federation Southern Section, as well as teams on the junior varsity, club, and junior high levels. 60% of HW students participate in interscholastic sports.

== Notable alumni ==
- Ania Bleszynski Jayich — Scientist University of California, Santa Barbara
- Pete Crow-Armstrong — Centerfielder Chicago Cubs
- Max Fried — Starting Pitcher New York Yankees
- Lucas Giolito — Pitcher San Diego Padres
- Jack Flaherty — Pitcher Detroit Tigers
- Mindy Cohn — Actress, discovered at Westlake by producers of Facts of Life who were doing research for the series.

== Notable faculty ==
- Amy Alcott (born 1956) – golfer
- Caitlin Flanagan (born 1961) – writer and social critic
- Ethan Katz (born 1983) – pitching coach for the Chicago White Sox
