= Gilbert Patten =

American writer (1866–1945)

- Born: William George Patten; October 25, 1866; Corinna, Maine, US
- Died: January 16, 1945 (aged 78); Vista, California, US
- Resting place: Ridgewood's Valleau Cemetery
- Education: Corinna Union Academy
- Occupation: Author
- Spouses: Alice Gardner (m. 1886; div. 1898); Mary Nunn (m. 1900; div. 1916); Carol Kramer (m. 1918; death 1938)
- Children: 2
- Writing career
- Pen name: Gilbert Patten, Burt L. Standish, Herbert Bellwood, Julian St. Dare, William West Wilder
- Years active: 1886–1930
- Genre: dime novels

William George "Gilbert" Patten (October 25, 1866 – January 16, 1945) was a writer of dime novels and is best known as author of the Frank Merriwell stories, with the pen name Burt L. Standish.

== Biography ==
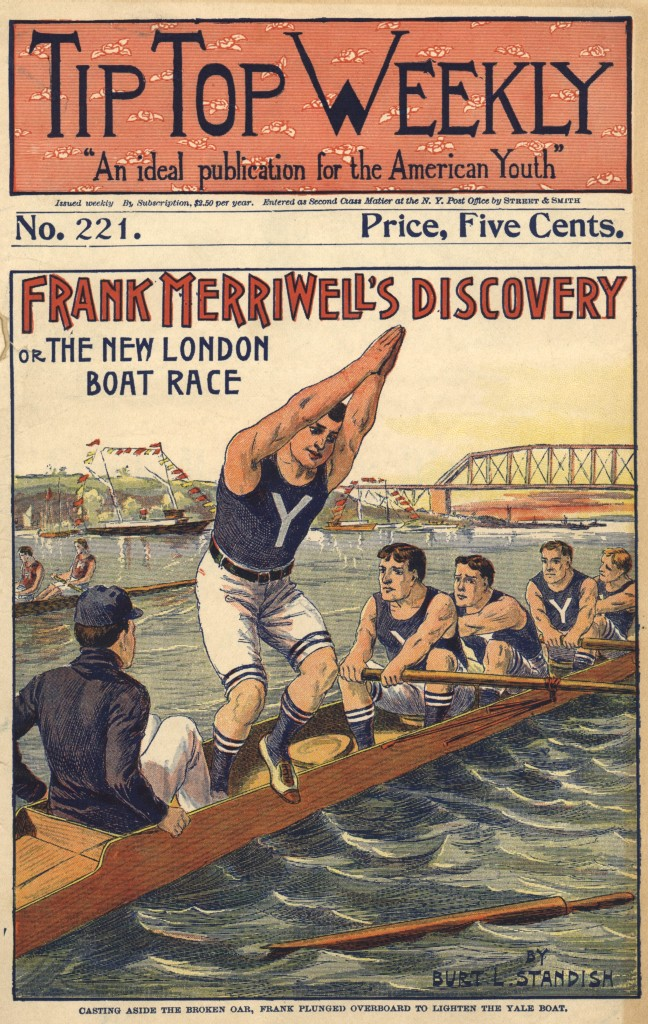
Frank Merriwell's Discovery on the cover of Tip Top Weekly (1900)

Tip Top Films produced the 1910 film Frank Merriwell in Arizona; or, The Mystery of the Mine

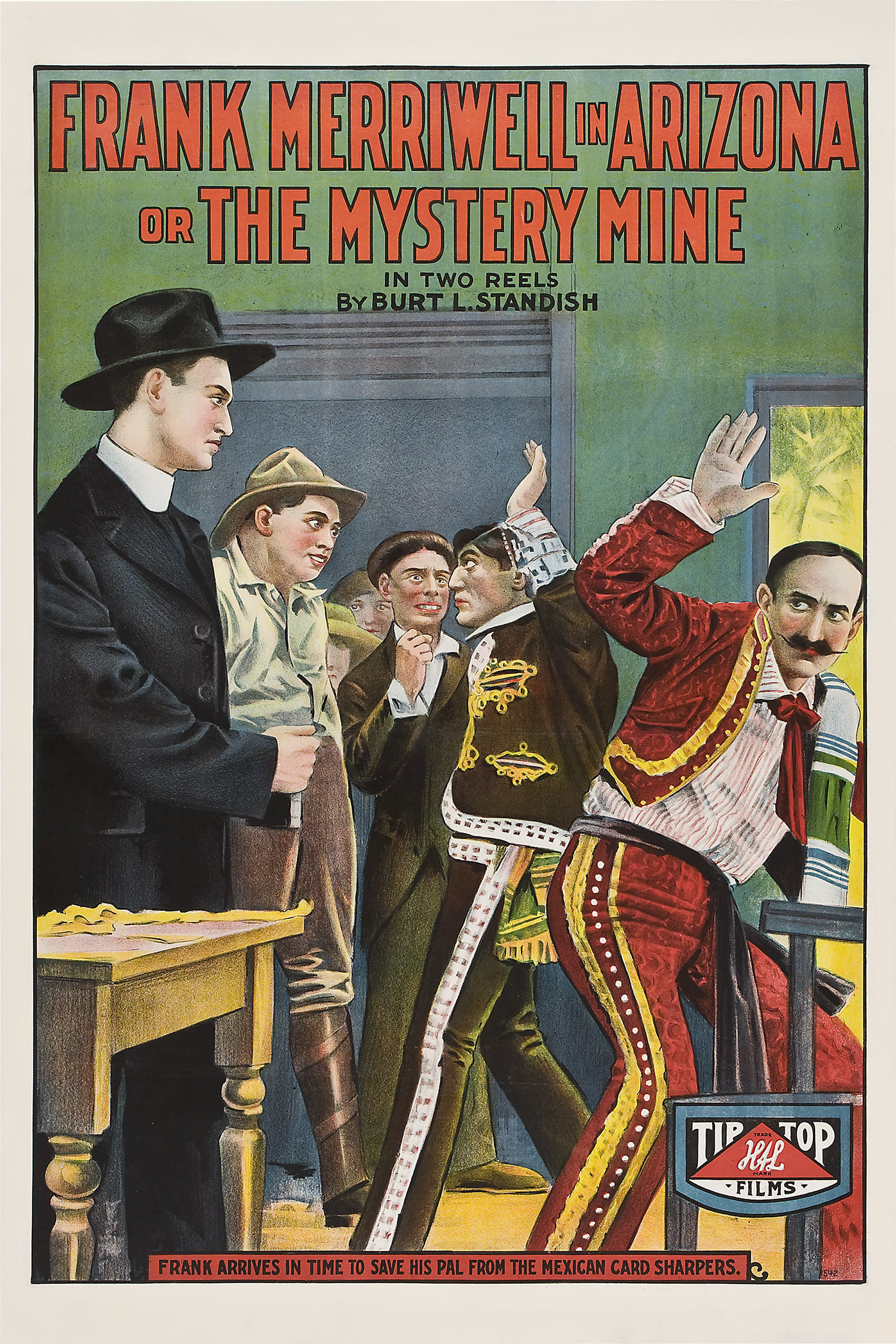
Poster for Frank Merriwell in Arizona (1910)

Gilbert Patten was born in Corinna, Maine in 1866. His father, a carpenter, and his mother were deeply religious pacifists. They were Seventh Day Adventists. He entered Corinna Union Academy at fourteen, but when his father threatened that he would be put to work if he did not improve at school, Patten ran away to Biddeford, Maine where he worked in a machine shop. When he returned home and told his father that he would become an author, he was given thirty days to prove himself. He sold his first two stories in this period to the dime novel company of Erastus Flavel Beadle, and combined his resumed studies for the next four years with writing and publishing stories. When he was twenty, he married his schoolmate Alice Gardner on 25 October 1886. Their son Harvan Barr Patten was born in 1892. They divorced in 1898 and Gilbert Patten remarried to Mary Nunn of Baltimore (1900–1916) and he married a third time to Carol Kramer in 1918 until her death in 1938.

Patten worked at the Pittsfield Advertiser before creating in 1888 his own newspaper, the Corinna Owl. He sold it the next year to the Advertiser, and devoted his time to the stories, mostly westerns, for Beadle's Half-Dime Library.

Meanwhile, he managed a semi-professional baseball team in 1890–1891 in Camden, Maine before leaving for New York City. But after this season he again mostly worked as an author, working for Norman Munro, and for most of his career for Street & Smith.

He was a writer of dime novels. His first published dime novel was The Diamond Sport; or, The Double Face of Bed Rock, published in 1886 by Beadle. He wrote westerns with the pen name Wyoming Bill, but is best known for his sporting stories in the Frank Merriwell series, written as Burt L. Standish. Patten started writing the Merriwell stories in April 1896 for the publisher Street & Smith and produced one each week, at a length of twenty thousand words, for twenty years. The series, which appeared in Tip-Top Weekly, was immensely popular, selling some 135,000 copies a week, and the brothers Frank and Dick Merriwell became icons of All-American sportsmanship, entering the jargon of sports commentators. Patten, however, never received any royalties for them, being paid up to $150 per story as a hack writer. The series was originally inspired by the success of the British Penny Dreadfuls like Jack Harkaway. Gibert Patten also contributed to the Frank Merriwell comic strip from 1928, and supervised the 1934 NBC radio series. In 1893, he hired Edward Stratemeyer as a writer for the Street & Smith publication Good News. From 1927 to 1930, Gilbert Patten would start a new series of Frank Merriwell stories, aided now by a few ghostwriters. In 1930, Patten started his own publication, The Dime Novel, but only one issue appeared. Apart from the Merriwell stories, Patten wrote 75 complete novels and an unknown number of stories. He estimated that he had written 40 million words as an author. In total, some 500 million of his books were in print, making him one of the best-selling fiction authors of all time.

He lived most of his life in Camden, Maine, but moved to California in 1941. He died aged 78 in his sleep at the home of his son H. V. Patten in Vista, California in 1945.

== Partial bibliography ==
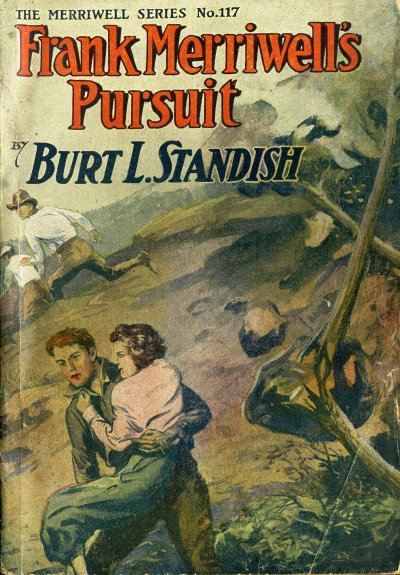
Cover of Frank Merriwell's Pursuit, by Burt L. Standish

=== As himself ===
- The Diamond Sport, 1886, 1 story
- Violet Vane, 8 stories between 1889 and 1892
- The Deadwood Trail, 1 novel published by D. Appleton and Co. in 1904
- Football stories in Popular Magazine, a Street & Smith publication (1903)
- Cliff Stirling or Clif Sterling, a series of five sporting novels published by David McKay between 1910 and 1916
- Jack Lockwill, a 1927–1928 comic strip, different illustrators

=== The College Life Series ===
1. Boltwood of Yale (1914)
2. The College Rebel (1914)
3. On College Battlefields (1917)
4. The Call of the Varsity (1920)
5. Sons of Old Eli (1923)
6. Ben Oakman, Stroke (1925)

=== As Burt L. Standish ===
- NEW Tip Top Weekly: An Ideal Publication For The American Youth
  - Owen Clancy's Run of Luck or, The Motor Wizard in the Garage (1914)
  - Owen Clancy's Happy Trail or, The Motor Wizard in California (1914)
- Frank Merriwell, 209 dime novels between 1896 and 1930 (some between 1927 and 1930 written by other authors with the same pen name), 28 of them reprinted as hard covers
- Big League, 16 episodes of baseball stories

The following are the first 143 titles of the Merriwell series (Stories of Frank and Dick Merriwell)

1. Frank Merriwell's School Days By Burt L. Standish
2. Frank Merriwell's Chums By Burt L. Standish
3. Frank Merriwell's Foes By Burt L. Standish
4. Frank Merriwell's Trip West By Burt L. Standish
5. Frank Merriwell Down South By Burt L. Standish
6. Frank Merriwell's Bravery By Burt L. Standish
7. Frank Merriwell's Hunting Tour By Burt L. Standish
8. Frank Merriwell in Europe By Burt L. Standish
9. Frank Merriwell at Yale By Burt L. Standish
10. Frank Merriwell's Sports Afield By Burt L. Standish
11. Frank Merriwell's Races By Burt L. Standish
12. Frank Merriwell's Party By Burt L. Standish
13. Frank Merriwell's Bicycle Tour By Burt L. Standish
14. Frank Merriwell's Courage By Burt L. Standish
15. Frank Merriwell's Daring By Burt L. Standish
16. Frank Merriwell's Alarm By Burt L. Standish
17. Frank Merriwell's Athletes By Burt L. Standish
18. Frank Merriwell's Skill By Burt L. Standish
19. Frank Merriwell's Champions By Burt L. Standish
20. Frank Merriwell's Return to Yale By Burt L. Standish
21. Frank Merriwell's Secret By Burt L. Standish
22. Frank Merriwell's Danger By Burt L. Standish
23. Frank Merriwell's Loyalty By Burt L. Standish
24. Frank Merriwell in Camp By Burt L. Standish
25. Frank Merriwell's Vacation By Burt L. Standish
26. Frank Merriwell's Cruise By Burt L. Standish
27. Frank Merriwell's Chase By Burt L. Standish
28. Frank Merriwell in Maine By Burt L. Standish
29. Frank Merriwell's Struggle By Burt L. Standish
30. Frank Merriwell's First Job By Burt L. Standish
31. Frank Merriwell's Opportunity By Burt L. Standish
32. Frank Merriwell's Hard Luck By Burt L. Standish
33. Frank Merriwell's Protégé By Burt L. Standish
34. Frank Merriwell on the Road By Burt L. Standish
35. Frank Merriwell's Own Company By Burt L. Standish
36. Frank Merriwell's Fame By Burt L. Standish
37. Frank Merriwell's College Chums By Burt L. Standish
38. Frank Merriwell's Problem By Burt L. Standish
39. Frank Merriwell's Fortune By Burt L. Standish
40. Frank Merriwell's New Comedian By Burt L. Standish
41. Frank Merriwell's Prosperity By Burt L. Standish
42. Frank Merriwell's Stage Hit By Burt L. Standish
43. Frank Merriwell's Great Scheme By Burt L. Standish
44. Frank Merriwell in England By Burt L. Standish
45. Frank Merriwell on the Boulevards By Burt L. Standish
46. Frank Merriwell's Duel By Burt L. Standish
47. Frank Merriwell's Double Shot By Burt L. Standish
48. Frank Merriwell's Baseball Victories By Burt L. Standish
49. Frank Merriwell's Confidence By Burt L. Standish
50. Frank Merriwell's Auto By Burt L. Standish
51. Frank Merriwell's Fun By Burt L. Standish
52. Frank Merriwell's Generosity By Burt L. Standish
53. Frank Merriwell's Tricks By Burt L. Standish
54. Frank Merriwell's Temptation By Burt L. Standish
55. Frank Merriwell on Top By Burt L. Standish
56. Frank Merriwell's Luck By Burt L. Standish
57. Frank Merriwell's Mascot By Burt L. Standish
58. Frank Merriwell's Reward By Burt L. Standish
59. Frank Merriwell's Phantom By Burt L. Standish
60. Frank Merriwell's Faith By Burt L. Standish
61. Frank Merriwell's Victories By Burt L. Standish
62. Frank Merriwell's Iron Nerve By Burt L. Standish
63. Frank Merriwell in Kentucky By Burt L. Standish
64. Frank Merriwell's Power By Burt L. Standish
65. Frank Merriwell's Shrewdness By Burt L. Standish
66. Frank Merriwell's Set Back By Burt L. Standish
67. Frank Merriwell's Search By Burt L. Standish
68. Frank Merriwell's Club By Burt L. Standish
69. Frank Merriwell's Trust By Burt L. Standish
70. Frank Merriwell's False Friend By Burt L. Standish
71. Frank Merriwell's Strong Arm By Burt L. Standish
72. Frank Merriwell as Coach By Burt L. Standish
73. Frank Merriwell's Brother By Burt L. Standish
74. Frank Merriwell's Marvel By Burt L. Standish
75. Frank Merriwell's Support By Burt L. Standish
76. Dick Merriwell At Fardale By Burt L. Standish
77. Dick Merriwell's Glory By Burt L. Standish
78. Dick Merriwell's Promise By Burt L. Standish
79. Dick Merriwell's Rescue By Burt L. Standish
80. Dick Merriwell's Narrow Escape By Burt L. Standish
81. Dick Merriwell's Racket By Burt L. Standish
82. Dick Merriwell's Revenge By Burt L. Standish
83. Dick Merriwell's Ruse By Burt L. Standish
84. Dick Merriwell's Delivery By Burt L. Standish
85. Dick Merriwell's Wonders By Burt L. Standish
86. Frank Merriwell's Honor By Burt L. Standish
87. Dick Merriwell's Diamond By Burt L. Standish
88. Frank Merriwell's Winners By Burt L. Standish
89. Dick Merriwell's Dash By Burt L. Standish
90. Dick Merriwell's Ability By Burt L. Standish
91. Dick Merriwell's Trap By Burt L. Standish
92. Dick Merriwell's Defense By Burt L. Standish
93. Dick Merriwell's Model By Burt L. Standish
94. Dick Merriwell's Mystery By Burt L. Standish
95. Frank Merriwell's Backers By Burt L. Standish
96. Dick Merriwell's Backstop By Burt L. Standish
97. Dick Merriwell's Western Mission By Burt L. Standish
98. Frank Merriwell's Rescue By Burt L. Standish
99. Frank Merriwell's Encounter By Burt L. Standish
100. Dick Merriwell's Marked Money By Burt L. Standish
101. Frank Merriwell's Nomads By Burt L. Standish
102. Dick Merriwell on the Gridiron By Burt L. Standish
103. Dick Merriwell's Disguise By Burt L. Standish
104. Dick Merriwell's Test By Burt L. Standish
105. Frank Merriwell's Trump Card By Burt L. Standish
106. Frank Merriwell's Strategy By Burt L. Standish
107. Frank Merriwell's Triumph By Burt L. Standish
108. Dick Merriwell's Grit By Burt L. Standish
109. Dick Merriwell's Assurance By Burt L. Standish
110. Dick Merriwell's Long Slide By Burt L. Standish
111. Frank Merriwell's Rough Deal By Burt L. Standish
112. Dick Merriwell's Threat By Burt L. Standish
113. Dick Merriwell's Persistence By Burt L. Standish
114. Dick Merriwell's Day By Burt L. Standish
115. Frank Merriwell's Peril By Burt L. Standish, ©1904
116. Dick Merriwell's Downfall By Burt L. Standish
117. Frank Merriwell's Pursuit By Burt L. Standish
118. Dick Merriwell Abroad By Burt L. Standish
119. Frank Merriwell in the Rockies By Burt L. Standish
120. Dick Merriwell's Pranks By Burt L. Standish
121. Frank Merriwell's Pride By Burt L. Standish
122. Frank Merriwell's Challengers By Burt L. Standish
123. Frank Merriwell's Endurance By Burt L. Standish, ©1905
124. Dick Merriwell's Cleverness By Burt L. Standish
125. Frank Merriwell's Marriage By Burt L. Standish
126. Dick Merriwell, the Wizard By Burt L. Standish
127. Dick Merriwell's Stroke By Burt L. Standish
128. Dick Merriwell's Return By Burt L. Standish
129. Dick Merriwell's Resource By Burt L. Standish
130. Dick Merriwell's Five By Burt L. Standish
131. Frank Merriwell's Tigers By Burt L. Standish
132. Dick Merriwell's Polo Team By Burt L. Standish
133. Frank Merriwell's Pupils By Burt L. Standish
134. Frank Merriwell's New Boy By Burt L. Standish
135. Dick Merriwell's Home Run By Burt L. Standish
136. Dick Merriwell's Dare By Burt L. Standish
137. Frank Merriwell's Son By Burt L. Standish
138. Dick Merriwell's Team Mate. By Burt L. Standish
139. Frank Merriwell's Leaguers By Burt L. Standish
140. Frank Merriwell's Happy Camp By Burt L. Standish
141. Dick Merriwell's Influence By Burt L. Standish
142. Dick Merriwell, Freshman By Burt L. Standish
143. Dick Merriwell's Staying Power By Burt L. Standish

=== As William West Wilder, aka Wyoming Bill ===
- Westerns

=== As Harry Dangerfield ===
- Westerns, e.g. The Boy Cattle King

=== As Emerson Bell ===
- Science fiction, e.g. In The Heart of the Earth (the pen name was also used by Edward Stratemeyer)

=== As Gordon Braddock ===
- Rex Kingdon

=== As Morgan Scott ===
- Oakdale

=== As George Thruston Burr ===
- Bob Hunter, 1 story in 1930

=== As Bertha M. Clay ===
- Stories for Street & Smith: name used by different authors
