= Brainerd =

Brainerd may refer to:

== Place names in the United States ==
- Brainerd, a neighborhood in Chicago, Illinois
  - Brainerd station, a train station in Chicago
- Brainerd, Kansas, an unincorporated community
- Brainerd, Minnesota, a city
  - Brainerd International Raceway, near Brainerd, Minnesota

== People ==
- Brainerd (surname)
- Brainerd (given name)

== Schools in the United States ==
- Brainerd Institute, a former school for African Americans in Chester, South Carolina, expanded to include Brainerd Junior College in 1934
- Brainerd High School (Minnesota), Brainerd, Minnesota
- Brainerd High School (Tennessee), Chattanooga, Tennessee
- Brainerd School, a one-room schoolhouse in Mount Holly, New Jersey

== Other uses ==
- Brainerd (band), an American hard rock band
- Brainerd diarrhea
- Brainerd Mission, a former Christian mission to the Cherokee in present-day Chattanooga, Tennessee

== See also ==
- East Brainerd, Tennessee
- Brainard (disambiguation)
