= Brainard (surname) =

Brainard is a surname. Notable people with the surname include:

- Asa Brainard (1841–1888), American baseball pitcher
- Bertha Brainard (1890–1946), American broadcast executive
- Byron B. Brainard (1894–1940), Los Angeles City Council member
- Cam Brainard (born 1962), American voice actor and radio personality
- Cecilia Manguerra Brainard (born 1947), Filipino American writer
- Charles L. Brainard (1903–1988), American presidential library commissioner
- Daniel Brainard (1812–1866), American surgeon
- David H. Brainard (born 1960), American psychologist and vision researcher
- David L. Brainard (1856–1949), American Arctic explorer and soldier
- Edwin H. Brainard (1882–1957), American Marine aviation pioneer
- Ingrid Brainard (1925–2000), German dance historian
- J. Edwin Brainard (1857–1942), Lieutenant Governor of Connecticut
- James Brainard (born 1954), Mayor of Carmel, Indiana
- Jeremiah Gates Brainard (c. 1759–1830), Justice of the Connecticut Supreme Court
- Joe Brainard (1942–1994), American artist
- John Gardiner Calkins Brainard (1795–1828), American lawyer, editor and poet
- Josh Brainard, ex-guitarist for Slipknot
- Lael Brainard (born 1962), member of the U.S. Federal Reserve Board of Governors
- Mary Gardiner Brainard (1837–1905), American writer of religious poetry
- Michael Brainard (born 1965), American actor
- William Brainard (born c. 1935), American economist
