= Brainard =

Brainard may refer to:

- 99928 Brainard, asteroid within Sol system

== Places ==
- East Brainerd, Tennessee
- Brainard, California:
  - Modern Brainard, California
  - Early name of Bracut, California
- Hartford–Brainard Airport (in Hartford, Connecticut area), for small aircraft
- Brainard, Nebraska
- Brainard, New York

== Other uses ==
- Brainard (surname)

== See also ==
- Brainerd (disambiguation)
