= Mary Gardiner (disambiguation) =

Mary Gardiner is an Australian Linux programmer and women's rights activist.

Mary Gardiner may also refer to:

- Mary Gardiner Brainard (1837–1905), American writer of religious poetry
- Mary Gardiner Horsford (1824–1855), American poet; wife of chemist Eben Norton Horsford
- Mary Gardiner Jones (1920–2009), American first woman to serve as a member of the U.S. Federal Trade Commission
