= Brainerd (surname) =

Brainerd is a surname. Notable people with the name include:

- David Brainerd (1718–1747), Christian missionary to Native Americans, brother of John
- Eleanor Hoyt Brainerd (1868–1942), U.S. novelist of the early 20th century
- Elizabeth L. Brainerd (born 1963), American biologist
- Ezra Brainerd (1844–1924), president of Middlebury College in Vermont
- John Brainerd (1720–1781), Presbyterian minister and missionary, brother of David
- John Grist Brainerd (1904–1988), American computer pioneer
- Lawrence Brainerd (1794–1870), U.S. Senator from Vermont
- Paul Brainerd (born 1947), American businessman, computer programmer and philanthropist
- Samuel Myron Brainerd (1842–1898), U.S. Representative from Pennsylvania
- Sibyl Brainerd (1896–1997), another name for Sibyl Anikeef, American photographer
- Tereasa Brainerd, astronomer
