= McDonald Clarke =

American poet (1798–1842)

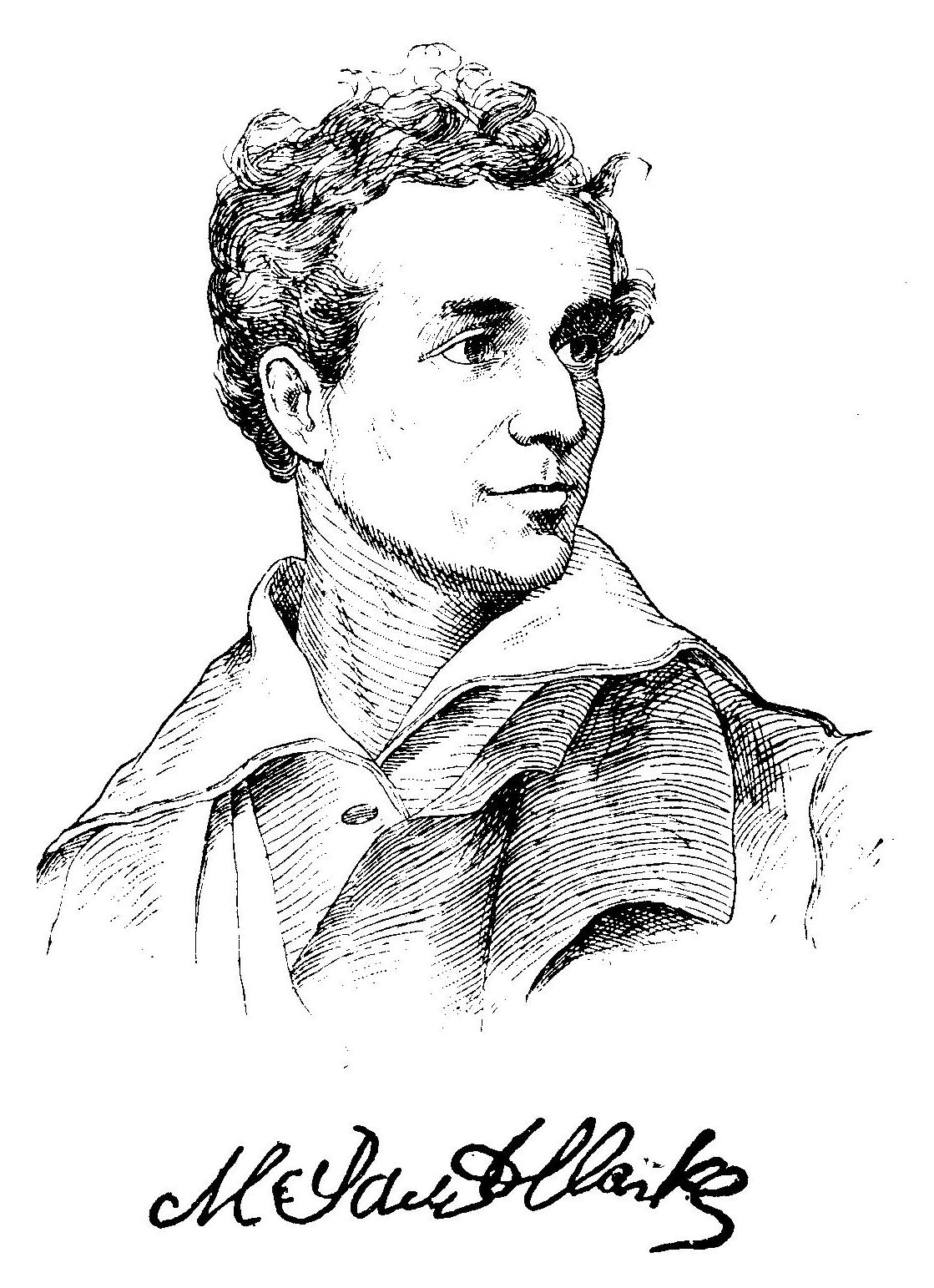
- Born: June 18, 1798; Bath, Maine
- Died: March 5, 1842 (aged 43)
- Occupation: Poet

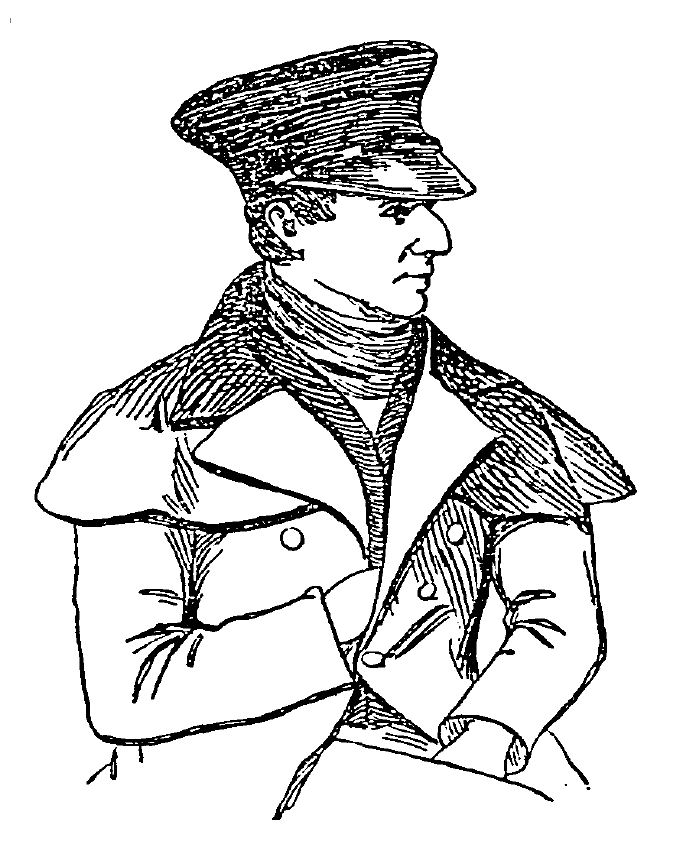
McDonald

McDonald Clarke (June 18, 1798 – March 5, 1842) was a poet of some fame in New York City in the early part of the 19th century. He was an influence on, and eulogized by Walt Whitman; but widely known as "the mad poet of Broadway", a label with which he identified. He is, arguably, an early example of an outsider artist.

== Biography ==
McDonald Clarke was born in Bath, Maine, on June 18, 1798, apparently the illegitimate son of a ship-merchant.

His mother, by his account, died at sea when he was 12, but little is known of his early life beyond the fact that he and the poet Brainard were playmates. He resided in Philadelphia for a time, reportedly sleeping in the grave-yard at Franklin's monument. By 1819 he had moved to New York City, where he sought to establish himself as a journalist and poet, but scraped by in varying degrees of poverty. Penniless, he eloped with and married an actor, a Miss Brundage, greatly against the wishes of her mother. The marriage faltered, seemingly largely because of his inability to earn a living or keep lodgings, and quickly ended in divorce.

He became a familiar and striking figure on Broadway, and well known as an eccentric character. Clarke was an imitator of Byron and copied his airs and costumes, but not – as the New York Times archly put it – his verses. Higgins suggests he embraced the mad poet role, in part as a means of entry into New York literary circles, and "clearly relished his role as jester"; but later downplayed the role.

Although he managed to produce work throughout his life, his mental health was fragile and failing. His character was described as "innocent as a child", imbued with a mystic romanticism, and by common consent, he had no vices, but always preserved a gentility of deportment, was inoffensive, and always mild, always happy. He was a regular attendant at the fashionable Episcopal Grace church on Broadway. His oddities, as his friend Fitz-Greene Halleck stated, were all amiable. Nevertheless, after the breakdown of his marriage his behavior became wilder and could give rise to alarm, particularly when he became fixated on and followed young women around the city. "His whole life was in fact a restless seeking for other half", according to biographer Lydia Maria Child.

In the early part of his career he subsisted, barely, on the proceeds of his published books. Later he relied on the sale of poems to newspapers, journals and magazines, but was rarely able to keep a roof over his head, and in a letter to the New York Evening Post was described as "a poetic scintillator of some what odd fancies, who kept the town laughing while he was sometimes starving." He is described as often being reduced to sleeping between two graves in Trinity churchyard, and surviving on crackers and milk.

He drowned on March 5, 1842, in a cell of the city prison by water from an open faucet. A policeman had found him in a destitute and apparently demented condition on the street and taken him to a jail for safety; but this triggered a mental collapse which saw him removed to an asylum. The immediate catalyst for the mental chain of incidents which brought about his death was the culmination of a cruel prank played on him by a group of youths, who elaborately convinced him that a certain woman for whom he longed was in love with him, before letting him down in the most abrupt fashion. McDonald Clarke is interred at Green-Wood Cemetery in Brooklyn, New York.

He was celebrated in life in an amusing poem called "The Discarded," written by Halleck, but it was upon Walt Whitman that he made the greatest impression. He penned a lengthy eulogy for Clarke in the Aurora, another article four days later praising him, and on March 16 published a poem, The Death and Burial of McDonald Clarke: A Parody, in the same magazine.

== Autobiography ==
A fragment of autobiography in his own handwriting, penned two months before his death, is still preserved. It reads:

"Begotten among the orange-groves, on the wild mountains of Jamaica, West Indies. Born in Bath, on the Kennebec River, State of Maine, 18th June, 1798. 1st Love, Mary H. of New London : last love, Mary T. of New York; intermediate sweethearts without number. No great compliment to the greatest Poet in America should like the change tho'; had to pawn my Diamond Ring (the gift of a lady), and go tick at Delmonico's for Dinner. So much for being the greatest Poet in America. The greatest Poet of the Country ought to have the freedom of the City, the girls of the gentry gratis, grab all along shore, the magnificent Mary, and snucks with all the sweet Sisters of Song."

== Works ==
In the eulogy, Whitman wrote:

"Whoever has power, in his writing, to draw bold, startling images, and strange pictures – the power to embody in language, original, and beautiful, and quaint ideas – is a true son of song. Clarke was such an one; not polished, perhaps, but yet one in whose faculties that all important vital spirit of poetry burnt with a fierce brightness.... We always, on perusing Clarke's pieces, felt, in the chambers of the mind within us, a moving and responding, as of harp cords, struck by the wind.

Clarke's most celebrated couplet is often used as a quotation:

"Now twilight lets her curtain down,

And pins it with a star."

It is also frequently quoted in the following form:

"Night dropped her sable curtain down, and

pinned it with a star."

=== Publications ===
- A Review of the Eve of Eternity, and other Poems (New York, 1820)
- The Elixir of Moonshine, by the Mad Poet (1822)
- The Gossip (1825)
- Poetic Sketches (1826)
- Afara, A Poem (1829)
- The Belles of Broadway (1833)
- Death in Disguise, a temperance poem (1833)
- Poems (1836)
- Cross and a Coronet (1841)

== Influence ==
Higgins states that Clarke's impact on Whitman was quite significant, influencing his choice of theme, persona as an outsider artist, and even in the incorporation of prefaces to his poetry collections. Higgins notes that it was said of Clarke that "in a sense, [he] was an early sketch of Whitman."
