= Burlington County Courthouse (New Jersey) =

Coordinates: 39.993611°N 74.787778°W

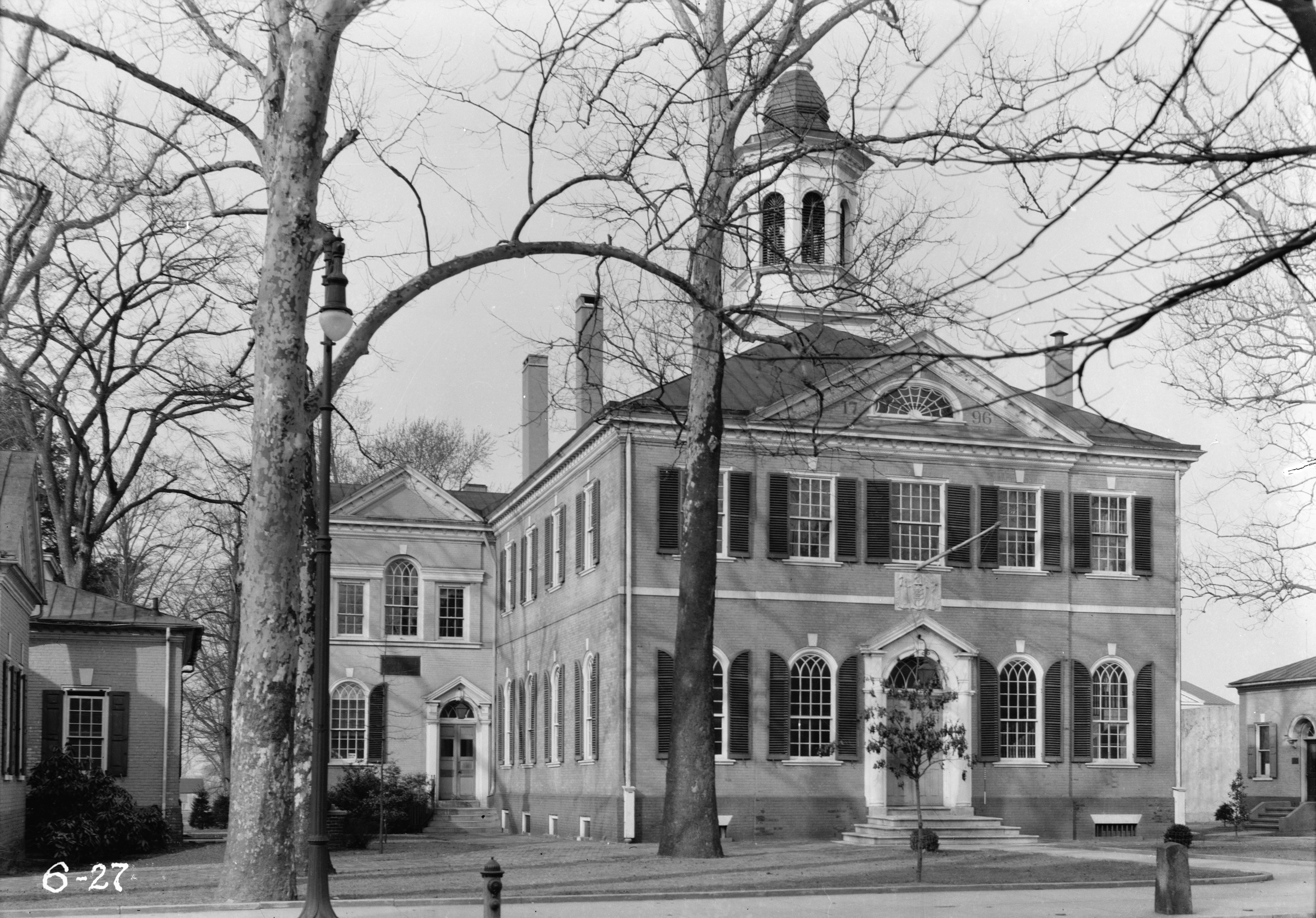
Burlington County Courthouse in Burlington, New Jersey in March 1936

The Burlington County Courthouse is located in Mount Holly, the county seat of Burlington County, New Jersey, U.S., which itself is coterminous with the 3rd vicinage. The historic courthouse continues to handle judicial proceedings.

The building was constructed in 1796 under the direction of Michael Rush. Its architect, Samuel Lewis, designed the building as a virtual identical twin of Congress Hall and Old City Hall, the buildings flanking Independence Hall in Philadelphia. The courthouse bell, removed and installed from an earlier courthouse, rang for independence in 1776.

It is a contributing property to the Mount Holly Historic District, listed on the New Jersey Register of Historic Places (#842) and National Register of Historic Places (#73001084) in 1973. and has been documented by the Historic American Buildings Survey (HABS NJ-27).

== See also ==
- List of the oldest courthouses in the United States
- County courthouses in New Jersey
- Federal courthouses in New Jersey
- Richard J. Hughes Justice Complex
- National Register of Historic Places listings in Burlington County, New Jersey
