= Brainerd School =

- Old Schoolhouse
- U.S. National Register of Historic Places
- U.S. Historic district – Contributing property
- New Jersey Register of Historic Places
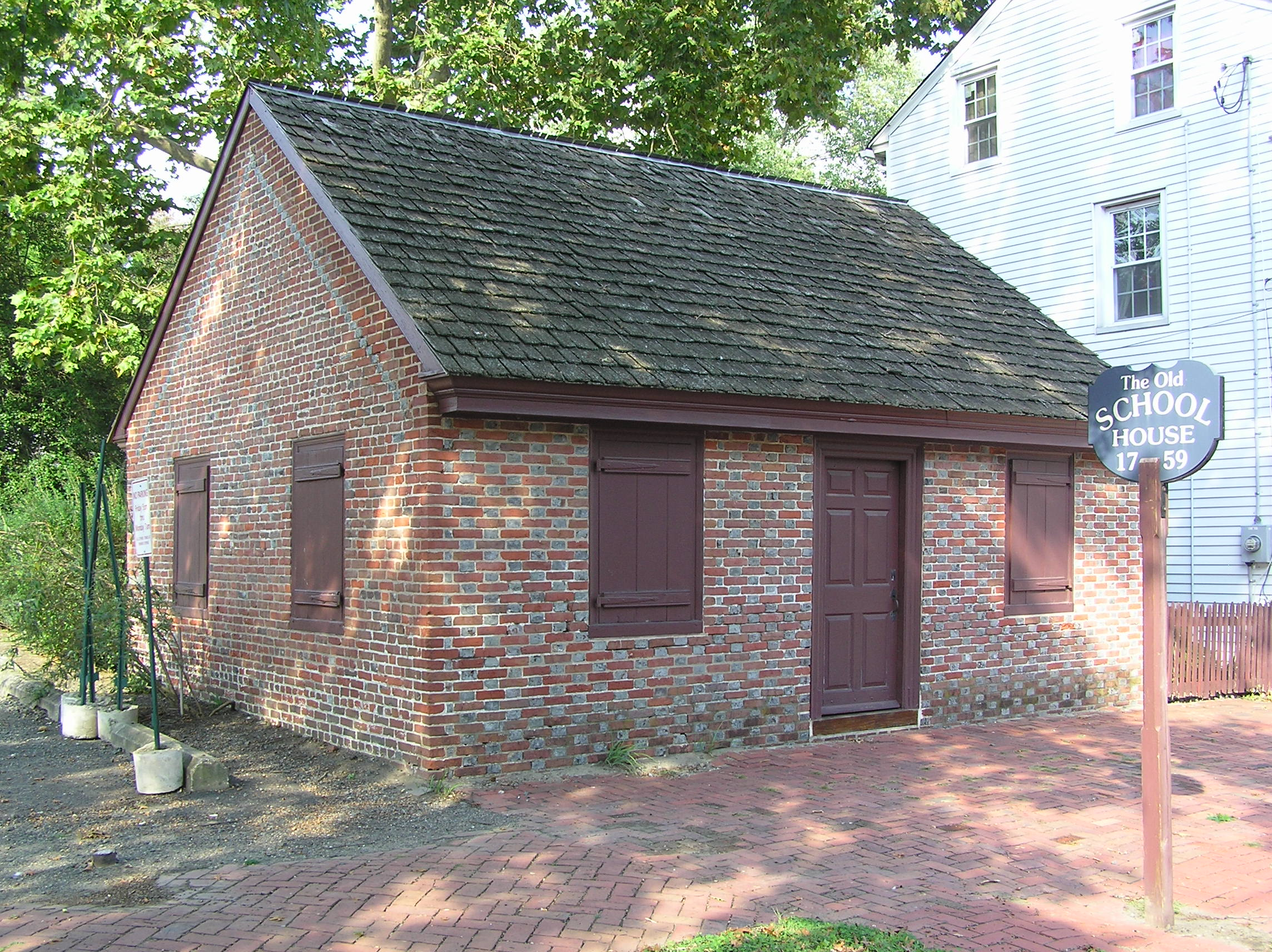

- Location within Burlington County, New Jersey Location within New Jersey Location within the United States
- Location: 35 Brainerd Street; Mount Holly Township, New Jersey, USA
- Coordinates: 39°59′42″N 74°47′10″W
- Built: 1759
- Architectural style: Colonial
- Part of: Mount Holly Historic District (ID73001084)
- NRHP reference No.: 08001108
- NJRHP No.: 4848

Significant dates
- Added to NRHP: November 26, 2008
- Designated NJRHP: September 16, 2008

The Brainerd Schoolhouse is a one-room schoolhouse located at 35 Brainerd Street in Mount Holly Township, Burlington County, New Jersey, United States. Built in 1759, it is the oldest building of its type in the state and now a museum. Listed as the John Brainard School, it was documented by the Historic American Buildings Survey in 1936. Listed as the Old Schoolhouse, it was added to the National Register of Historic Places on November 26, 2008, for its significance in education. It is a contributing property to the Mount Holly Historic District. It is owned and operated by the National Society of the Colonial Dames of America.

== History and description ==
The brick building was constructed in 1759 with vernacular Georgian architecture. According to the NRHP documentation, the school has been erroneously associated with the Presbyterian minister and missionary John Brainerd (1720–1781). HABS also warned about this association.

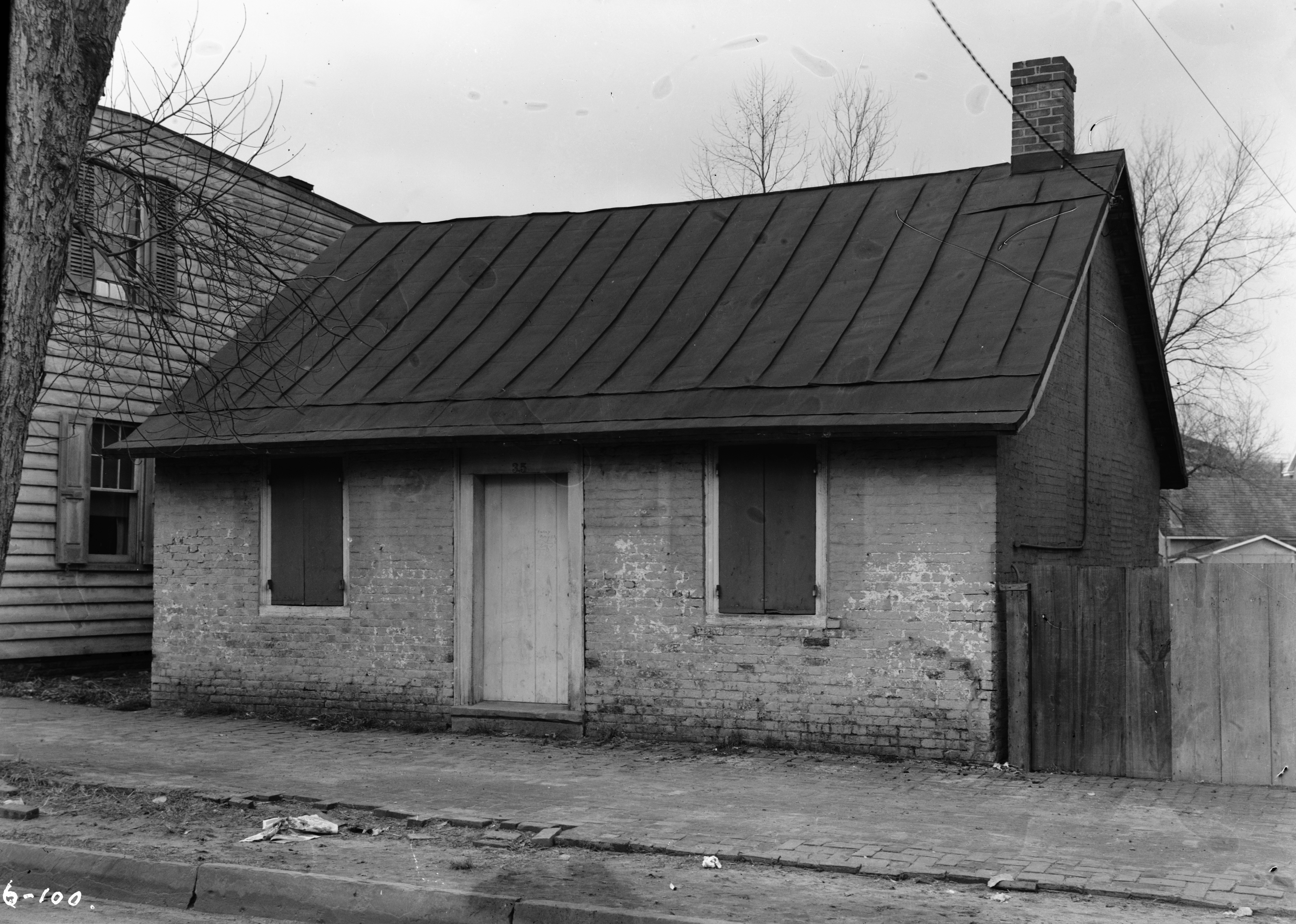
HABS photo from 1936

== See also ==
- List of the oldest buildings in New Jersey
- National Register of Historic Places listings in Burlington County, New Jersey
