= Shinn Curtis Log House =

Building in New Jersey, United States

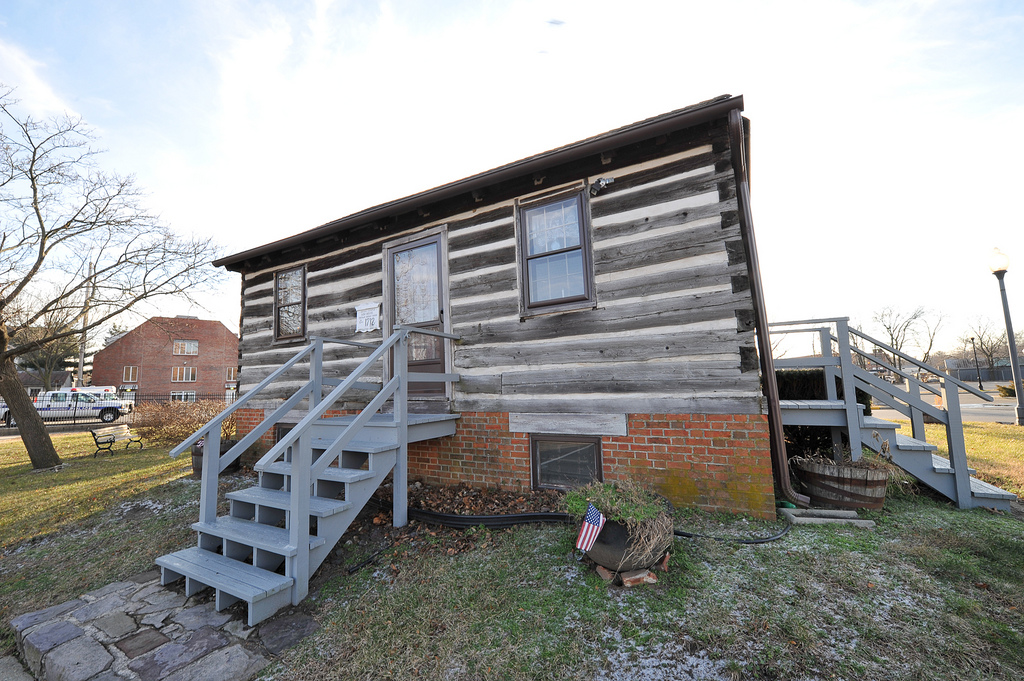
- Interactive map of the Shinn Curtis Log House area

General information
- Location: Mount Holly, New Jersey, 23 Washington Street
- Coordinates: 39°59′6″N 74°47′3″W
- Completed: 1712
- Owner: Mount Holly Historical Society

The Shinn Curtis Log House lies in the heart of a historic section of Mount Holly, New Jersey, United States at the corner of Commerce Street and Park Drive. The early settler's home of hand-hewn logs originally built in 1712 was encased in a house and was uncovered in 1967 when the surrounding house was demolished. It was in the possession of the Curtis family for 147 years, since 1802, and is now owned by the Mount Holly Historical Society. The building was relocated from what had been Water Street and renamed Rancocas Road.

== See also ==
- National Register of Historic Places listings in Burlington County, New Jersey
- List of the oldest buildings in New Jersey
