= Mount Holly, New Jersey =

Township in Burlington County, New Jersey, US

- Township
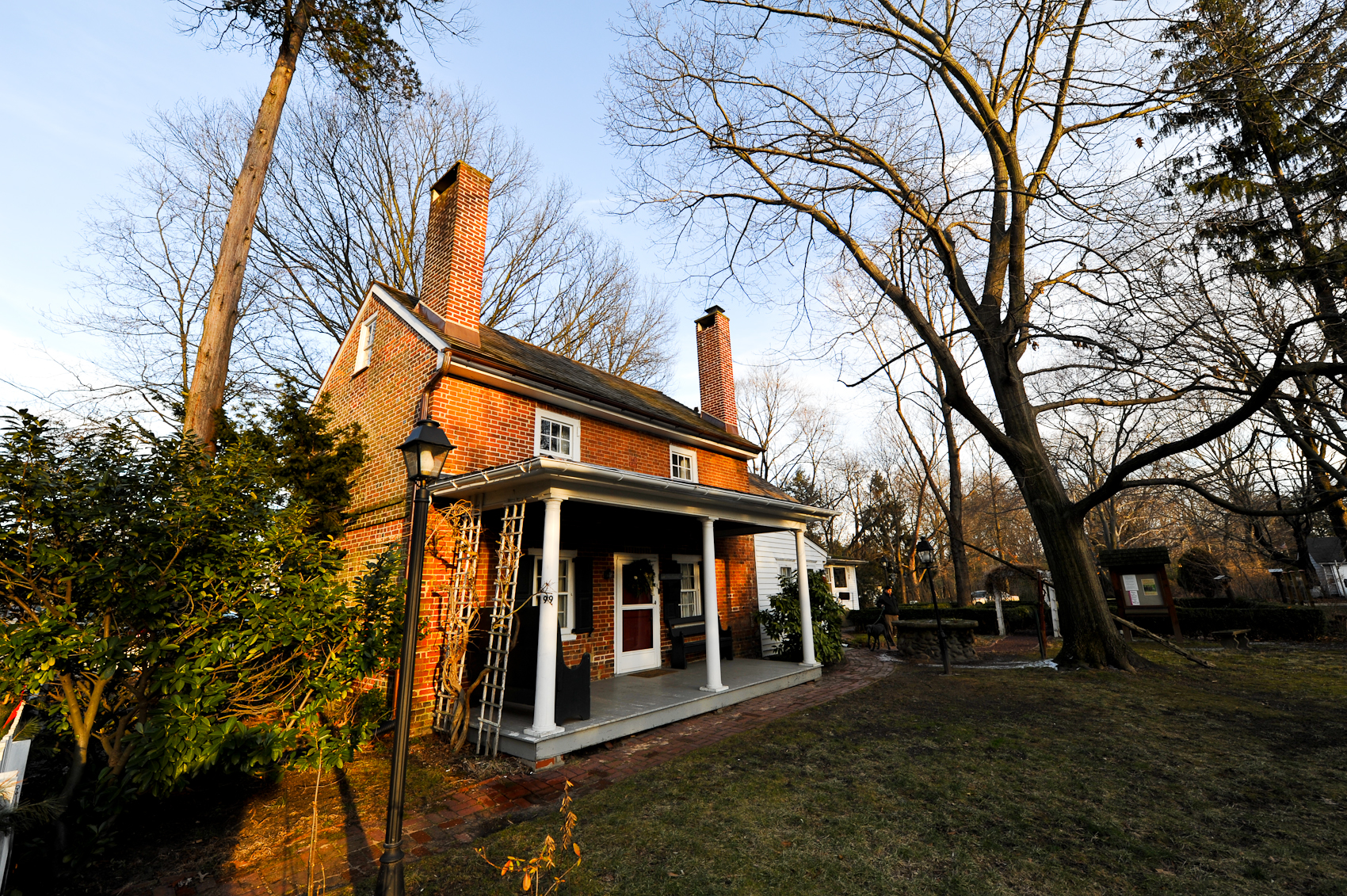
- John Woolman Memorial in Mount Holly

- Seal

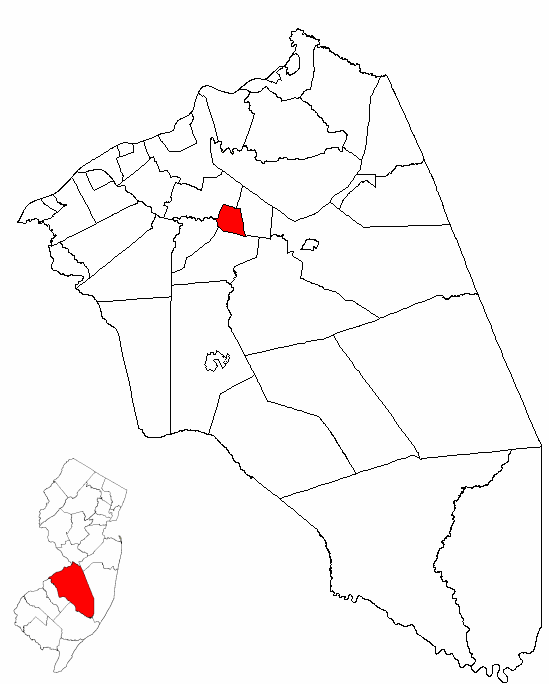
- Location of Mount Holly in Burlington County highlighted in red (right). Inset map: Location of Burlington County in New Jersey highlighted in red (left).

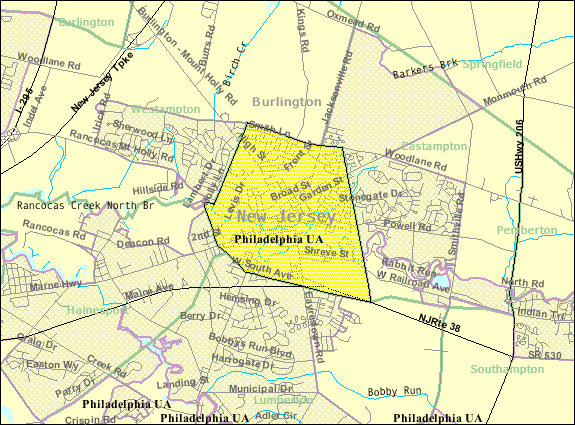
- Census Bureau map of Mount Holly Township, New Jersey Interactive map of Mount Holly, New Jersey

- Location in Burlington County Location in New Jersey Location in the United States
- Coordinates: 39.995336°N 74.786473°W
- Country: United States
- State: New Jersey
- County: Burlington
- Settled: 1677
- Formed: November 6, 1688 as Northampton
- Incorporated: February 21, 1798
- Renamed: November 6, 1931 as Mount Holly
- Named for: Hill covered with holly trees

Government
  - Type: Faulkner Act (council–manager)
  - Body: Township Council
  - Mayor: Chris Banks (D)
  - Township Manager: Joshua Brown
  - Municipal clerk: Sherry Marnell

Area
  - Total: 2.87 sq mi (7.43 km^{2})
  - Land: 2.82 sq mi (7.31 km^{2})
  - Water: 0.046 sq mi (0.12 km^{2}) 1.60%
  - Rank: 345th of 565 in state 31st of 40 in county
- Elevation: 36 ft (11 m)

Population (2020)
  - Total: 9,981
  - Estimate (2023): 10,151
  - Rank: 245th of 565 in state 15th of 40 in county
  - Density: 3,534.3/sq mi (1,364.6/km^{2})
  - Rank: 192nd of 565 in state 9th of 40 in county
- Time zone: UTC−05:00 (Eastern (EST))
  - Summer (DST): UTC−04:00 (Eastern (EDT))
- ZIP Code: 08060
- Area code: 609
- FIPS code: 3400548900
- GNIS feature ID: 0882104
- Website: www.twp.mountholly.nj.us

Mount Holly is a township that is the county seat of Burlington County in the U.S. state of New Jersey. It is an eastern suburb of Philadelphia, the nation's sixth largest city as of 2020. As of the 2020 United States census, the township's population was 9,981, an increase of 445 (+4.7%) from the 2010 census count of 9,536, which in turn reflected a decline of 1,192 (-11.1%) from the 10,728 counted in the 2000 census. The township, and all of Burlington County, is a part of the Philadelphia metropolitan area.

What is now Mount Holly was originally formed as Northampton on November 6, 1688. Northampton was incorporated as one of New Jersey's initial group of 104 townships created by an act of the New Jersey Legislature on February 21, 1798. Portions of the township were taken to form Little Egg Harbor Township (February 13, 1740, now part of Ocean County), Washington Township (November 19, 1802), Pemberton borough (December 15, 1826), Coaxen Township (March 10, 1845, now known as Southampton Township), Pemberton Township (March 10, 1846), Westampton Township (March 6, 1850) and Lumberton Township (March 14, 1860). There had been a Mount Holly post office since before the 1870 U.S. Census. The township was renamed Mount Holly as of November 6, 1931, based on the results of a referendum held three days earlier. The township was named for the prominent hill just north of downtown partially covered with holly trees. Some areas of today's Mount Holly were known as Bridgetown.

Mount Holly gives its name to the National Weather Service Weather Forecast Office for the Philadelphia metropolitan area, serving most of New Jersey, Southeastern Pennsylvania, all of Delaware and Eastern Maryland, though the office is actually located in adjacent Westampton.

== History ==
=== Colonial era ===
The first European settlement in what is now Mount Holly began in 1677 when Walter Reeves colonized the land from the Lenape (Delaware) Native Americans living in the area. He constructed a dam on Rancocas Creek to channel water through a raceway to power a gristmill and sawmill. Edward Gaskill and his sons dug the mill race on their property between 1720 and 1723. After the mills were established, more settlers were attracted to the area and built houses and commercial buildings on High, Church, White, Mill, and Pine streets, including the Shinn Curtis Log House (1712). By 1800, over 250 dwellings had been built.

Today no mills remain on the raceway, which still flows in its original course from the Rancocas just above the dam. The raceway proved a way for herring to make their way above the dam and was the scene of an annual fish run in the spring, which provided fresh herring for salting and eating. The former mill land has been preserved as the Mill Dam Park. It marks the importance of mills to the early settlements.

=== Revolutionary War ===
On December 17, 1776, Colonel Samuel Griffin of the Continental Army crossed the Delaware River with 600 men, mostly untrained men and boys with little equipment, who marched to Mount Holly where they set up a few 3-pounder artillery pieces on Iron Works Hill. Hessian commanders von Block and Carl von Donop were told that there were 3,000 American troops at Mount Holly.

By December 23, 1776, 2,000 Hessians were moved from Bordentown and positioned at The Mount in Mount Holly, where they engaged in a three-day-long artillery exchange, known as the Battle of Iron Works Hill or Battle of Mount Holly, with the Americans on Iron Works Hill. The Americans slipped away that night.

After George Washington crossed the Delaware River on December 25, 1776, the fact that thousands of Hessian troops had been drawn to Mount Holly aided in the Continental Army's success in the Battle of Trenton the next day, a surprising American victory that helped turn the Army's fading morale after the disastrous defeat at the Battle of Fort Washington just weeks before and the ignominious retreat through New Jersey.

=== 19th century ===
The 1793 state legislature approved the relocation of the Burlington County seat from Burlington City to Mount Holly, which was approved by voters in a 1796 referendum. Several important municipal buildings were constructed, including the courthouse in 1796 and the county prison built c. 1811. The Burlington County Prison was designed by Robert Mills, a nationally known architect who designed the Washington Monument. The town has numerous 18th and 19th-century buildings, most of which are included in the Mount Holly Historic District. Commercial buildings were constructed primarily along High Street.

In 1849, the Burlington and Mount Holly Railroad was established, connecting communities along the Delaware River to Philadelphia, the major city of the area. The railroad supported industrialization along its route. The Camden and Mount Holly Railroad constructed a station 20 years later near the intersection of Washington and King streets.

=== 20th century ===
A trolley station was built in 1904 for passengers making connections to Burlington City and Moorestown. New municipal buildings were constructed during the 20th century, including the Town Hall on Washington Street (1930) and the U.S. Post Office (1935) located across the street (1935), both federally funded and constructed as Works Progress Administration projects under President Franklin D. Roosevelt during the Great Depression.

In the late 1950s, Mount Holly began to have economic difficulties due to industrial restructuring and the loss of working-class jobs. In the post-World War II period, numerous blue collar, family wage jobs disappeared as the community's traditional employers, the mills and dye factories, were shut down. At first, these job losses were offset in part by gains at the nearby military bases, Fort Dix and McGuire Air Force Base, especially during the Vietnam War. In 1970, the residential vacancy rate in Mount Holly was 4.3%.

By 1980, however, the vacancy rate had climbed to 8.7% as a result of the nearby military installations' downsizing after the end of the Vietnam War. During this same period, 1970–1980, shopping malls proliferated in the suburban Philadelphia area, and retail business in Mount Holly suffered.

== Historic district ==
- Mount Holly Historic District
- U.S. National Register of Historic Places
- U.S. Historic district
- New Jersey Register of Historic Places
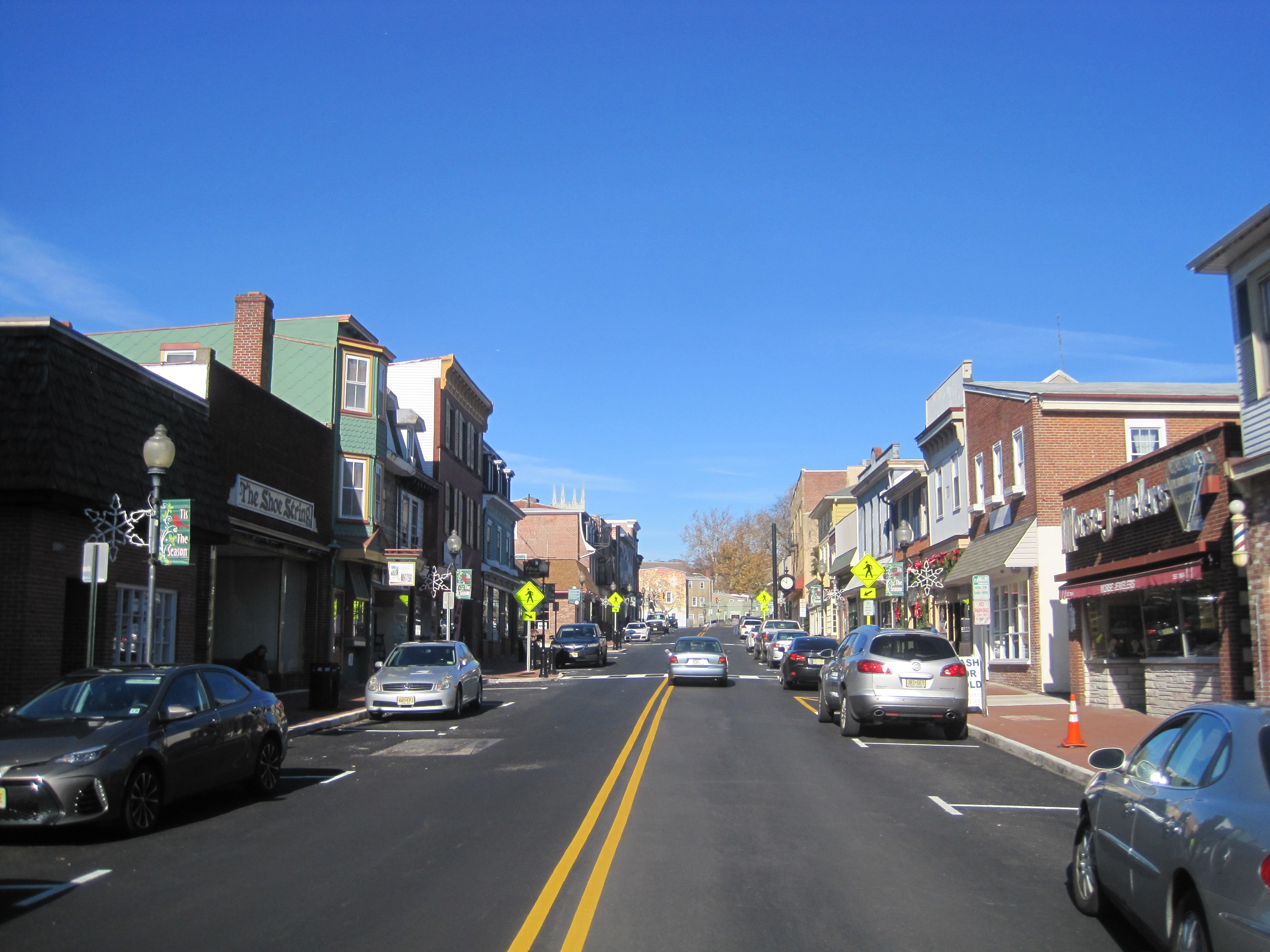
- Downtown Mount Holly along High Street
- Location: Roughly bounded by Prospect, Elm and Top-E-Toy Streets, railroad tracks, Madison and Clifton Avenues
- Area: 260 acres (110 ha)
- Architectural style: Late Victorian, Georgian, Gothic Revival
- NRHP reference No.: 73001084
- NJRHP No.: 842

Significant dates
- Added to NRHP: February 20, 1973
- Designated NJRHP: August 7, 1972

The Mount Holly Historic District is a 260-acre (110 ha) historic district encompassing downtown Mount Holly. It was added to the National Register of Historic Places on February 20, 1973, for its significance in architecture, education, landscape architecture, politics/government, and transportation. The district includes 39 contributing buildings. The individually listed Old Schoolhouse, also known as the Brainerd School, was built in 1759 and contributes to the district. The Burlington County Prison is also listed individually and was listed as a National Historic Landmark in 1986. The Burlington County Courthouse was designed by architect Samuel Lewis and constructed by Michael Rush in 1796.

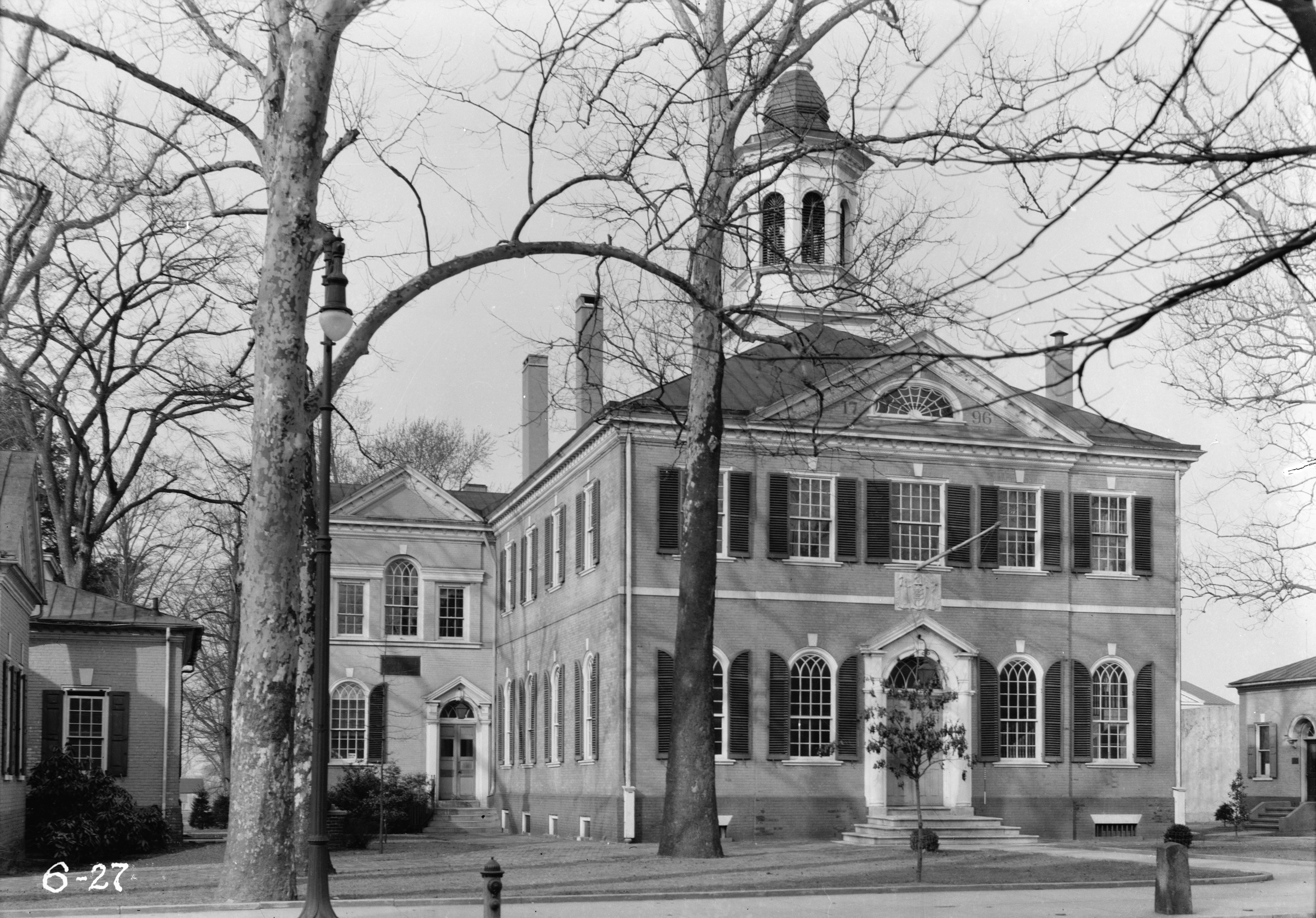
Burlington County Courthouse, HABS photo, 1936

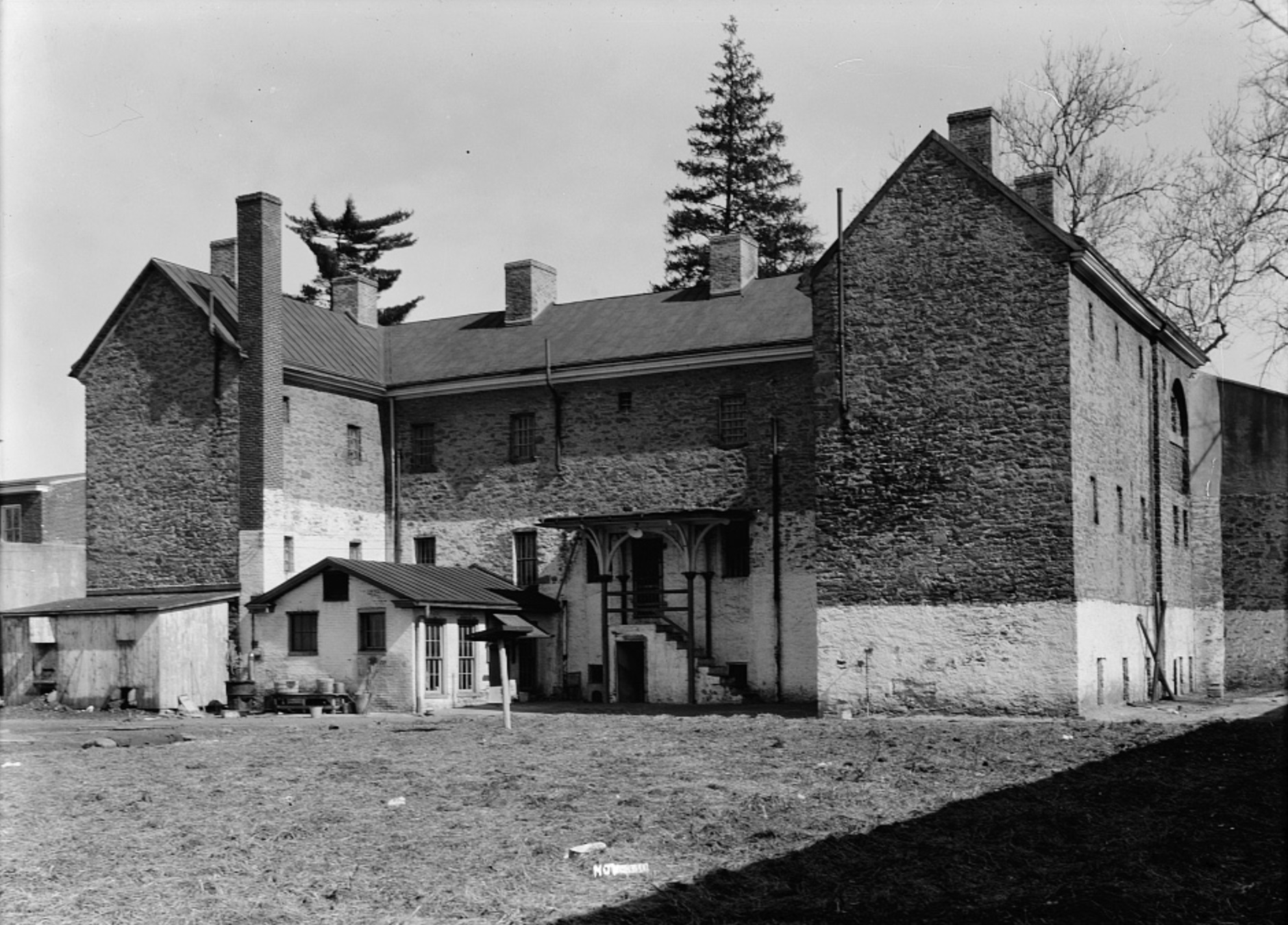
Burlington County Prison, HABS photo, 1938

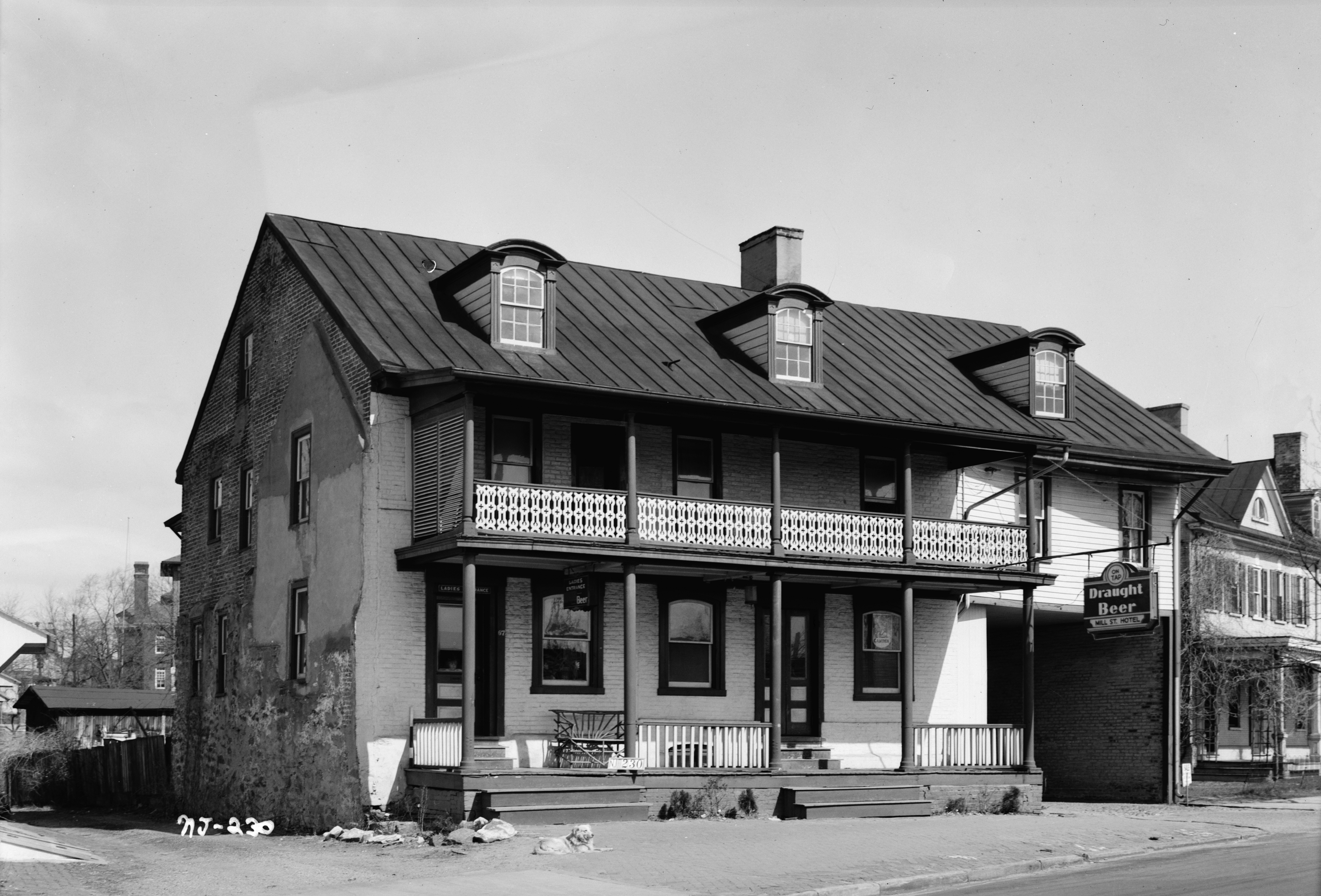
Three Tun Tavern, HABS photo, 1937

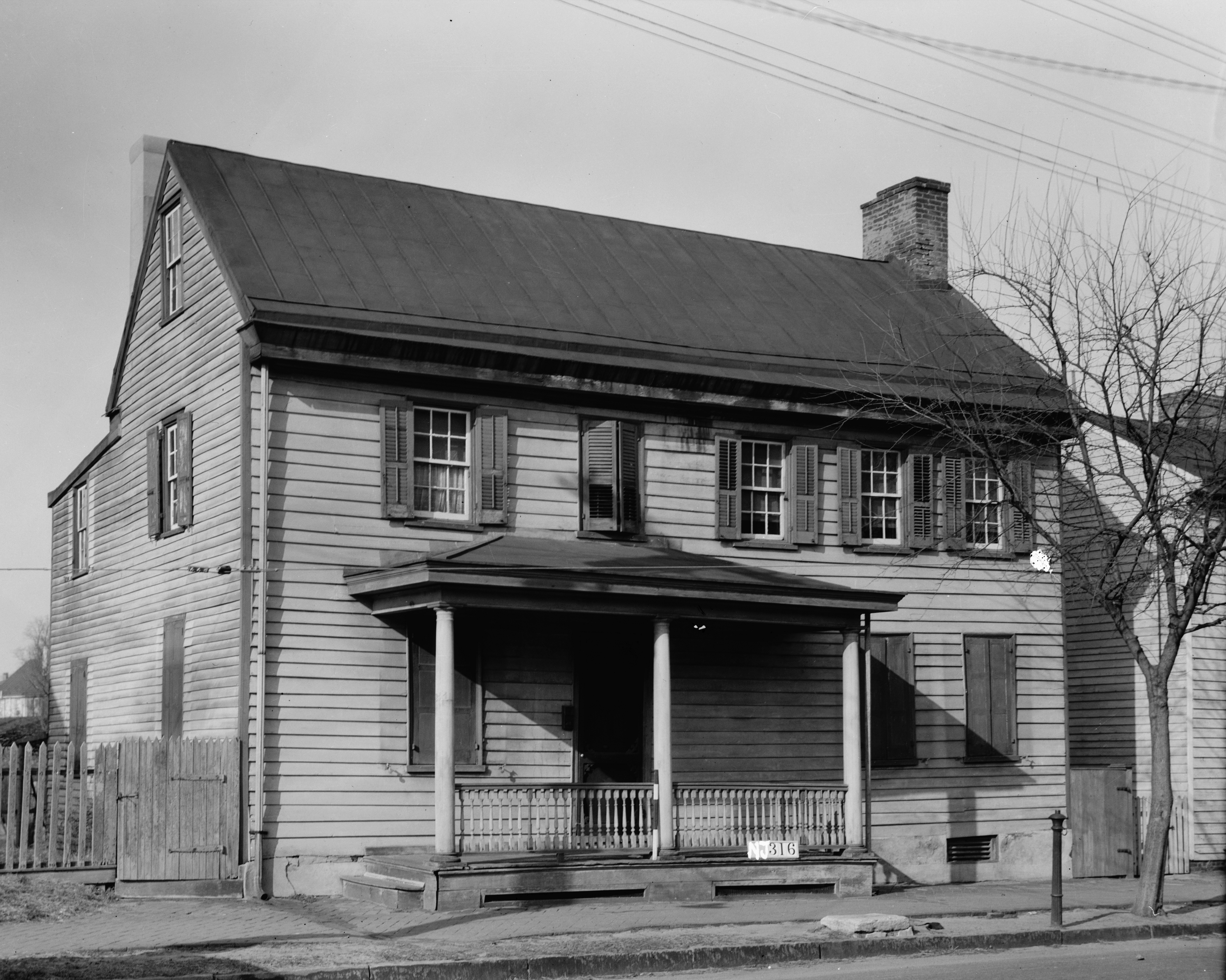
Stephen Girard House, HABS photo, 1937

== Geography ==
According to the U.S. Census Bureau, the township had a total area of 2.87 square miles (7.43 km^{2}), including 2.82 square miles (7.31 km^{2}) of land and 0.05 square miles (0.12 km^{2}) of water (1.60%). The township borders the Burlington County municipalities of Eastampton, Hainesport, Lumberton, and Westampton. Clermont is an unincorporated community located within Mount Holly Township.

== Climate ==
Climate data for South Jersey Regional Airport, 1991–2020 normals, extremes 1997–present
Month	Jan	Feb	Mar	Apr	May	Jun	Jul	Aug	Sep	Oct	Nov	Dec	Year
Record high °F (°C)	72 (22)	77 (25)	88 (31)	95 (35)	96 (36)	99 (37)	104 (40)	100 (38)	98 (37)	94 (34)	80 (27)	74 (23)	104 (40)
Mean maximum °F (°C)	64.4 (18.0)	63.4 (17.4)	74.3 (23.5)	84.5 (29.2)	89.5 (31.9)	94.1 (34.5)	97.1 (36.2)	93.6 (34.2)	91.1 (32.8)	82.7 (28.2)	72.6 (22.6)	66.3 (19.1)	97.7 (36.5)
Mean daily maximum °F (°C)	41.0 (5.0)	44.0 (6.7)	52.0 (11.1)	63.5 (17.5)	73.3 (22.9)	81.9 (27.7)	87.0 (30.6)	84.8 (29.3)	77.9 (25.5)	66.3 (19.1)	55.6 (13.1)	45.6 (7.6)	64.4 (18.0)
Daily mean °F (°C)	32.8 (0.4)	34.8 (1.6)	42.5 (5.8)	52.6 (11.4)	62.2 (16.8)	71.5 (21.9)	76.6 (24.8)	74.4 (23.6)	67.2 (19.6)	55.9 (13.3)	45.7 (7.6)	37.4 (3.0)	54.5 (12.5)
Mean daily minimum °F (°C)	24.6 (−4.1)	25.7 (−3.5)	32.9 (0.5)	41.6 (5.3)	51.1 (10.6)	61.0 (16.1)	66.2 (19.0)	64.0 (17.8)	56.5 (13.6)	45.6 (7.6)	35.9 (2.2)	29.1 (−1.6)	44.5 (6.9)
Mean minimum °F (°C)	7.9 (−13.4)	10.6 (−11.9)	18.3 (−7.6)	28.7 (−1.8)	37.4 (3.0)	48.0 (8.9)	55.9 (13.3)	52.9 (11.6)	43.6 (6.4)	30.8 (−0.7)	21.4 (−5.9)	16.5 (−8.6)	5.9 (−14.5)
Record low °F (°C)	−3 (−19)	−2 (−19)	2 (−17)	22 (−6)	34 (1)	42 (6)	43 (6)	44 (7)	37 (3)	27 (−3)	13 (−11)	7 (−14)	−3 (−19)
Average precipitation inches (mm)	2.97 (75)	2.57 (65)	3.83 (97)	3.37 (86)	2.95 (75)	3.73 (95)	5.19 (132)	4.40 (112)	3.39 (86)	3.67 (93)	2.98 (76)	3.74 (95)	42.79 (1,087)
Average precipitation days (≥ 0.01 in)	9.9	10.4	11.5	10.7	12.1	11.7	11.2	11.3	11.1	11.0	8.9	10.5	130.3
Source: NOAA (mean maxima/minima 2006–2020)

== Demographics ==
Historical population
Census	Pop.	Note	%±
1800	3,559		—
1810	4,171	*	17.2%
1820	4,833		15.9%
1830	5,516	*	14.1%
1840	6,813		23.5%
1850	3,031	*	−55.5%
1860	3,322		9.6%
1870	4,018	*	21.0%
1880	4,630		15.2%
1890	5,376		16.1%
1900	5,168		−3.9%
1910	5,652		9.4%
1920	5,901		4.4%
1930	6,573		11.4%
1940	6,892		4.9%
1950	8,206		19.1%
1960	13,271		61.7%
1970	12,713		−4.2%
1980	10,818		−14.9%
1990	10,639		−1.7%
2000	10,728		0.8%
2010	9,536		−11.1%
2020	9,981		4.7%
2023 (est.)	10,151		1.7%
Population sources: 1800–2000; 1800–1920 1840 1850–1870; 1850 1870 1880–1890; 1890–1910 1910–1930; 1940–2000 2000; 2010 2020 * = Lost territory in previous decade.

=== 2020 census ===
The 2020 United States census counted 9,981 people, 3,762 households. The racial makeup was 54.7% (5,458) White, 22.8% (2,273) Black or African American, 0.4% (39) Native American, 2.7% (266) Asian, 0.2% (17) Pacific Islander, 7.5% (745) from other races, and 11.9% (1,183) from two or more races. Hispanic or Latino of any race were 17.3% (1,722) of the population.

=== 2010 census ===
The 2010 United States census counted 9,536 people, 3,456 households, and 2,264 families in the township. The population density was 3,397.9 per square mile (1,311.9/km^{2}). There were 3,861 housing units at an average density of 1,375.8 per square mile (531.2/km^{2}). The racial makeup was 65.57% (6,253) White, 23.10% (2,203) Black or African American, 0.37% (35) Native American, 1.47% (140) Asian, 0.07% (7) Pacific Islander, 4.29% (409) from other races, and 5.13% (489) from two or more races. Hispanic or Latino of any race were 12.69% (1,210) of the population.

Of the 3,456 households, 28.7% had children under the age of 18; 42.6% were married couples living together; 16.9% had a female householder with no husband present and 34.5% were non-families. Of all households, 27.4% were made up of individuals and 8.6% had someone living alone who was 65 years of age or older. The average household size was 2.61 and the average family size was 3.19.

23.5% of the population were under the age of 18, 9.6% from 18 to 24, 28.7% from 25 to 44, 27.1% from 45 to 64, and 11.1% who were 65 years of age or older. The median age was 36.3 years. For every 100 females, the population had 102.8 males. For every 100 females ages 18 and older there were 100.1 males.

The Census Bureau's 2006–2010 American Community Survey showed that (in 2010 inflation-adjusted dollars) median household income was $53,841 (with a margin of error of ±$4,427) and the median family income was $68,500 (±$4,684). Males had a median income of $51,945 (±$5,141) versus $37,079 (±$5,759) for females. The per capita income for the borough was $24,551 (±$1,785). About 7.1% of families and 12.2% of the population were below the poverty line, including 21.4% of those under age 18 and 8.8% of those age 65 or over.

=== 2000 census ===
As of the 2000 United States census, there were 10,728 people, 3,903 households, and 2,583 families residing in the township. The population density was 3,750.8 inhabitants per square mile (1,448.2/km^{2}). There were 4,248 housing units at an average density of 1,485.2 per square mile (573.4/km^{2}). The racial makeup of the township was 68.68% White, 21.57% African American, 0.42% Native American, 1.37% Asian, 0.07% Pacific Islander, 4.77% from other races, and 3.12% from two or more races. Hispanic or Latino of any race were 8.78% of the population.

There were 3,903 households, out of which 32.0% had children under the age of 18 living with them, 44.0% were married couples living together, 17.3% had a female householder with no husband present, and 33.8% were non-families. 27.2% of all households were made up of individuals, and 10.0% had someone living alone who was 65 years of age or older. The average household size was 2.64 and the average family size was 3.20.

In the township, the age distribution of the population shows 26.3% under the age of 18, 9.4% from 18 to 24, 32.2% from 25 to 44, 19.6% from 45 to 64, and 12.4% who were 65 years of age or older. The median age was 35 years. For every 100 females, there were 99.7 males. For every 100 females age 18 and over, there were 96.6 males.

The median income for a household in the township was $43,284, and the median income for a family was $52,000. Males had a median income of $38,186 versus $27,425 for females. The per capita income for the township was $19,672. About 6.8% of families and 9.9% of the population were below the poverty line, including 11.4% of those under age 18 and 10.4% of those age 65 or over.

== Economy ==
Portions of the township are part of an Urban Enterprise Zone (UEZ), one of 32 zones covering 37 municipalities statewide. Mount Holly was selected in 1994 as one of a group of 10 zones added to participate in the program and one of four of those chosen based on a competition. In addition to other benefits to encourage employment and investment within the UEZ, shoppers can take advantage of a reduced 3.3125% sales tax rate (half of the 6 5/8% rate charged statewide) at eligible merchants. Established in March 1995, the city's Urban Enterprise Zone status expires in March 2026. The Township Council appoints a board of directors that oversees the operations of the Urban Enterprise Zone, which is managed by Joshua Brown, the township's Economic Development Director.

== Government ==
=== Local government ===
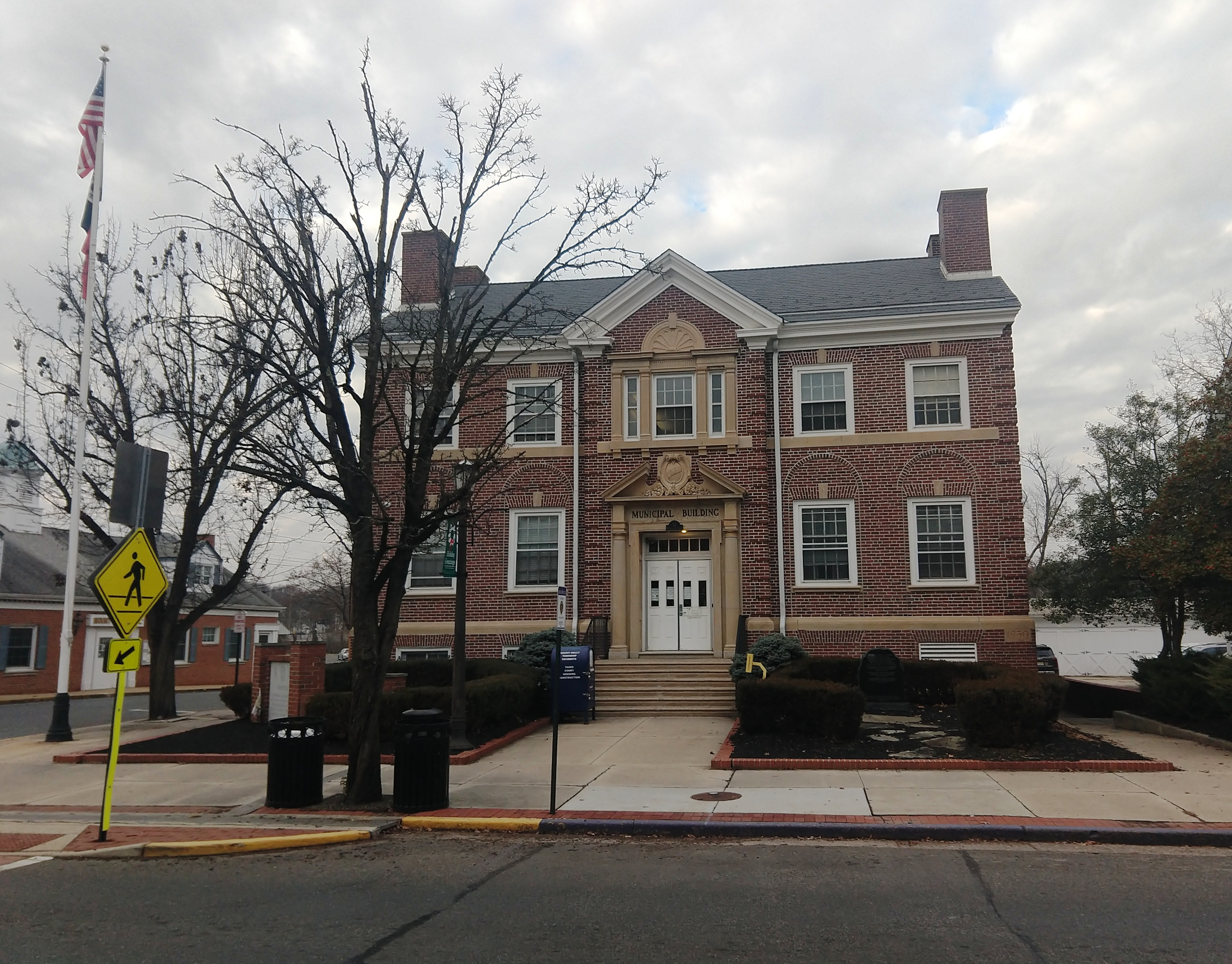
Mount Holly Municipal Building

Mount Holly Township operates within the Faulkner Act (formally known as the Optional Municipal Charter Law) under the Council-Manager (plan 12) form of municipal government, enacted by council-initiated action as of July 1, 1990. This form is used in 42 (of the 564) municipalities statewide. The township council is comprised of five members who are elected at-large in a partisan vote to serve four-year terms of office on a staggered basis, with either two or three seats up for election in even-numbered years as part of the November general election. At a reorganization meeting after each election, the council selects a mayor and a deputy mayor from among its members. In November 2011, voters passed a referendum shifting from non-partisan municipal elections in May to partisan elections in November.

As of 2023, members of the Mount Holly Township Council are Mayor Chris Banks (D, term on council ends December 31, 2024; term as mayor ends 2023), Deputy mayor Jason Jones (D, term on council ends 2024; term as deputy mayor ends 2023), Tara E. Astor (D, 2025), Lewis Brown (D, 2024) and Kim Burkus (D, 2025).

=== Federal, state, and county representation ===
Mount Holly Township is located in the 3rd Congressional District and is part of New Jersey's 8th state legislative district.

For the 119th United States Congress, New Jersey's 3rd congressional district is currently represented Herb Conaway (D, Delran Township). New Jersey is represented in the United States Senate by Democrats Cory Booker (Newark, term ends 2027) and Andy Kim (Moorestown, term ends 2031).

For the 2026–2027 session, the 8th legislative district of the New Jersey Legislature is represented in the New Jersey Senate by Latham Tiver (R, Southampton Township) and in the General Assembly by Anthony Angelozzi (D, Hammonton) and Andrea Katz (D, Chesterfield Township).

Burlington County is governed by a Board of County Commissioners comprised of five members who are chosen at-large in partisan elections to serve three-year terms of office on a staggered basis, with either one or two seats coming up for election each year; at an annual reorganization meeting, the board selects a director and deputy director from among its members to serve a one-year term. As of 2026, Burlington County's Commissioners are: Director Felicia Hopson (D, Willingboro Township, term as commissioner ends December 31, 2027; term as director ends 2026), Deputy Director Allison Eckel (D, Medford, term as commissioner ends 2028; term as deputy director ends 2026), Randy Brolo (D, Lumberton, 2026; elected to an unexpired term), Tyler Burrell (D, Delran Township, 2027) and Tom Pullion (D, Edgewater Park, 2026).

Burlington County's constitutional officers are Clerk Joanne Schwartz (D, Southampton Township, 2028), Sheriff James H. Kostoplis (D, Bordentown, 2028) and Surrogate Brian J. Carlin (D, Burlington Township, 2026).

=== Politics ===
United States presidential election results for Mount Holly 2024 2020 2016 2012 2008 2004
Year	Republican		Democratic		Third party(ies)	
Year	No.	%	No.	%	No.	%
2024	1,290	31.39%	2,738	66.62%	82	2.00%
2020	1,355	29.36%	3,150	68.26%	110	2.38%
2016	1,171	30.67%	2,469	64.67%	178	4.66%
2012	1,127	29.53%	2,636	69.08%	53	1.39%
2008	1,272	31.02%	2,771	67.57%	58	1.41%
2004	1,612	41.63%	2,223	57.41%	37	0.96%

As of March 2011, there were a total of 5,251 registered voters in Mount Holly Township, of which 1,718 (32.7% vs. 33.3% countywide) were registered as Democrats, 1,034 (19.7% vs. 23.9%) were registered as Republicans and 2,496 (47.5% vs. 42.8%) were registered as Unaffiliated. There were 3 voters registered as Libertarians or Greens. Among the township's 2010 Census population, 55.1% (vs. 61.7% in Burlington County) were registered to vote, including 72.0% of those ages 18 and over (vs. 80.3% countywide).

In the 2012 presidential election, Democrat Barack Obama received 2,636 votes here (68.1% vs. 58.1% countywide), ahead of Republican Mitt Romney with 1,127 votes (29.1% vs. 40.2%) and other candidates with 53 votes (1.4% vs. 1.0%), among the 3,870 ballots cast by the township's 5,578 registered voters, for a turnout of 69.4% (vs. 74.5% in Burlington County). In the 2008 presidential election, Democrat Barack Obama received 2,771 votes here (67.2% vs. 58.4% countywide), ahead of Republican John McCain with 1,272 votes (30.8% vs. 39.9%) and other candidates with 58 votes (1.4% vs. 1.0%), among the 4,125 ballots cast by the township's 5,473 registered voters, for a turnout of 75.4% (vs. 80.0% in Burlington County). In the 2004 presidential election, Democrat John Kerry received 2,223 votes here (57.2% vs. 52.9% countywide), ahead of Republican George W. Bush with 1,612 votes (41.5% vs. 46.0%) and other candidates with 37 votes (1.0% vs. 0.8%), among the 3,887 ballots cast by the township's 5,301 registered voters, for a turnout of 73.3% (vs. 78.8% in the whole county).

Gubernatorial election results for Mount Holly
Year	Republican		Democratic		Third party(ies)	
Year	No.	%	No.	%	No.	%
2025	901	27.22%	2,388	72.15%	21	0.63%
2021	870	37.07%	1,452	61.87%	25	1.07%
2017	774	35.92%	1,332	61.81%	49	2.27%
2013	1,251	57.84%	891	41.19%	21	0.97%
2009	977	43.25%	1,126	49.85%	156	6.91%
2005	897	41.03%	1,162	53.16%	127	5.81%

In the 2013 gubernatorial election, Republican Chris Christie received 1,251 votes here (56.9% vs. 61.4% countywide), ahead of Democrat Barbara Buono with 891 votes (40.5% vs. 35.8%) and other candidates with 21 votes (1.0% vs. 1.2%), among the 2,200 ballots cast by the township's 5,429 registered voters, yielding a 40.5% turnout (vs. 44.5% in the county). In the 2009 gubernatorial election, Democrat Jon Corzine received 1,126 ballots cast (49.6% vs. 44.5% countywide), ahead of Republican Chris Christie with 977 votes (43.1% vs. 47.7%), Independent Chris Daggett with 118 votes (5.2% vs. 4.8%) and other candidates with 38 votes (1.7% vs. 1.2%), among the 2,269 ballots cast by the township's 5,524 registered voters, yielding a 41.1% turnout (vs. 44.9% in the county).

United States Senate election results for Mount Holly1
Year	Republican		Democratic		Third party(ies)	
Year	No.	%	No.	%	No.	%
2024	1,048	26.84%	2,735	70.04%	122	3.12%
2018	1,101	33.18%	1,982	59.73%	235	7.08%
2012	1,070	29.57%	2,511	69.40%	37	1.02%
2006	971	43.60%	1,197	53.75%	59	2.65%

United States Senate election results for Mount Holly2
Year	Republican		Democratic		Third party(ies)	
Year	No.	%	No.	%	No.	%
2020	1,307	28.99%	3,108	68.94%	93	2.06%
2014	667	34.36%	1,239	63.83%	35	1.80%
2013	484	36.56%	821	62.01%	19	1.44%
2008	1,218	33.20%	2,359	64.30%	92	2.51%

== Education ==
For pre-kindergarten through eighth grade, students attend the Mount Holly Township Public Schools. As of the 2024–25 school year, the district, comprised of three schools, had an enrollment of 1,163 students and 106.0 classroom teachers (on an FTE basis), for a student–teacher ratio of 11.0:1. Schools in the district (with 2024–25 enrollment data from the National Center for Education Statistics) are John Brainerd School with 304 students in grades PreK-1, Gertrude C. Folwell School with 327 students in grades 2-4 and F. W. Holbein Middle School with 451 students in grades 5-8.

For ninth through twelfth grades, public school students attend the Rancocas Valley Regional High School, a comprehensive regional public high school based in Mount Holly that serves students from five communities encompassing an area of 40 square miles (100 km^{2}) that also includes the townships of Eastampton, Hainesport, Lumberton and Westampton. As of the 2024–25 school year, the high school had an enrollment of 1,928 students and 136.0 classroom teachers (on an FTE basis), for a student–teacher ratio of 14.2:1. The high school is located in Mount Holly. The district's board of education is comprised of nine members who are elected directly by voters to serve three-year terms of office on a staggered basis, with three seats up for election each year as part of the November general election. Seats on the board are allocated based on the population of the five constituent municipalities, with two seats assigned to Mount Holly.

Students from Mount Holly, and from all of Burlington County, are eligible to attend the Burlington County Institute of Technology, a countywide public school district that serves the vocational and technical education needs of students at the high school and post-secondary level at its campuses in Medford and Westampton.

Sacred Heart School is a Catholic school serving students in grades PreK-8, operating under the auspices of the Roman Catholic Diocese of Trenton.

== Transportation ==
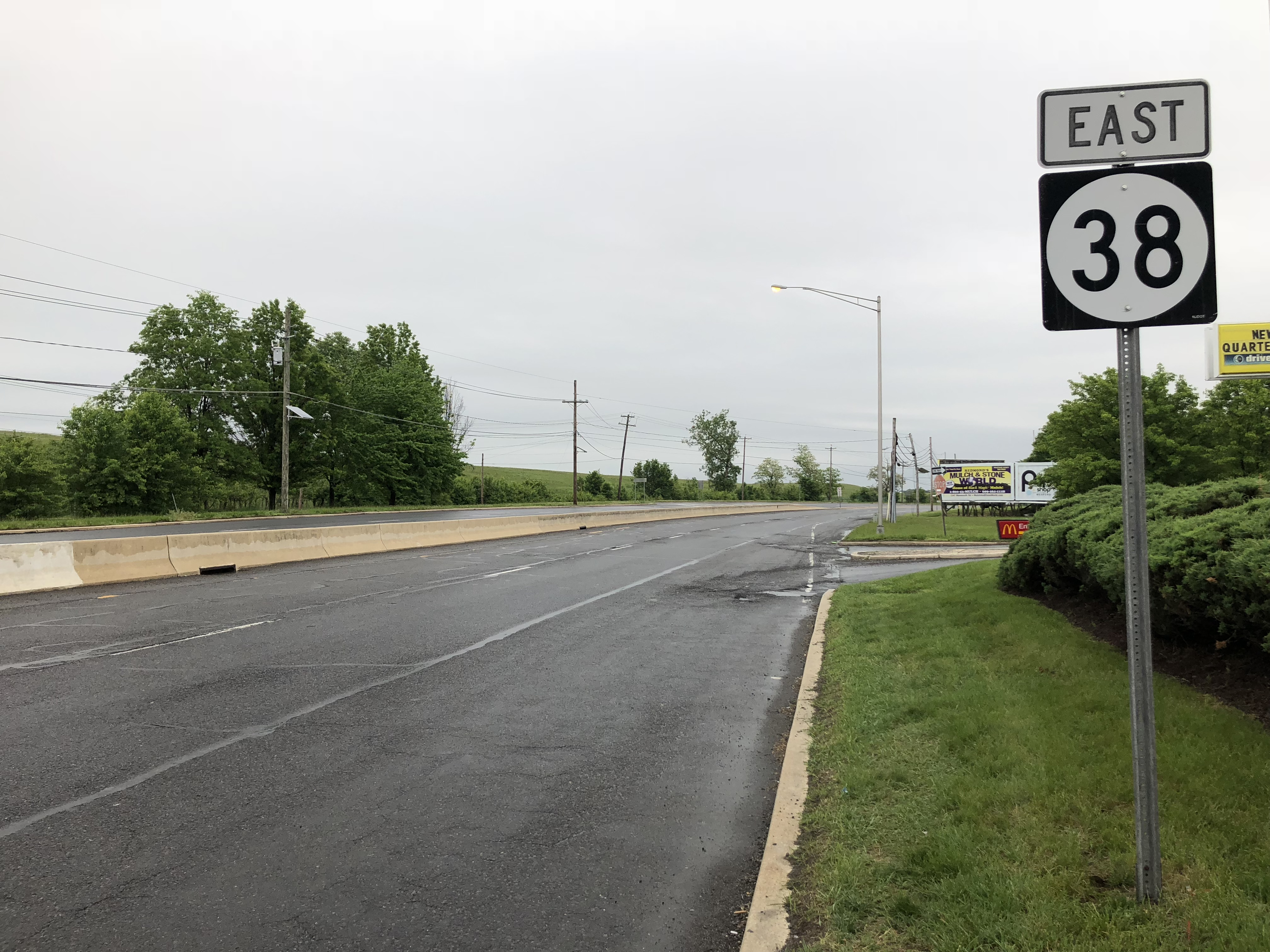
Route 38 in Mount Holly

=== Roads and highways ===
As of May 2010, the township had a total of 38.43 miles (61.85 km) of roadways, of which 29.11 miles (46.85 km) were maintained by the municipality, 8.45 miles (13.60 km) by Burlington County and 0.87 miles (1.40 km) by the New Jersey Department of Transportation.

The only state highway serving Mount Holly is Route 38, which crosses from west to east at the township's southern end. Major county roads that pass through Mount Holly include County Route 537 and County Route 541.

Mount Holly is accessible at exit 5 of the New Jersey Turnpike in neighboring Westampton and exit 47 of 5 via CR 541 in Burlington Township.

=== Public transportation ===
NJ Transit provides bus service to Philadelphia on routes 317 (from Asbury Park) and 409/417/418 (from Trenton), with local service available on the 413 route between Camden and Burlington.

== Points of interest ==
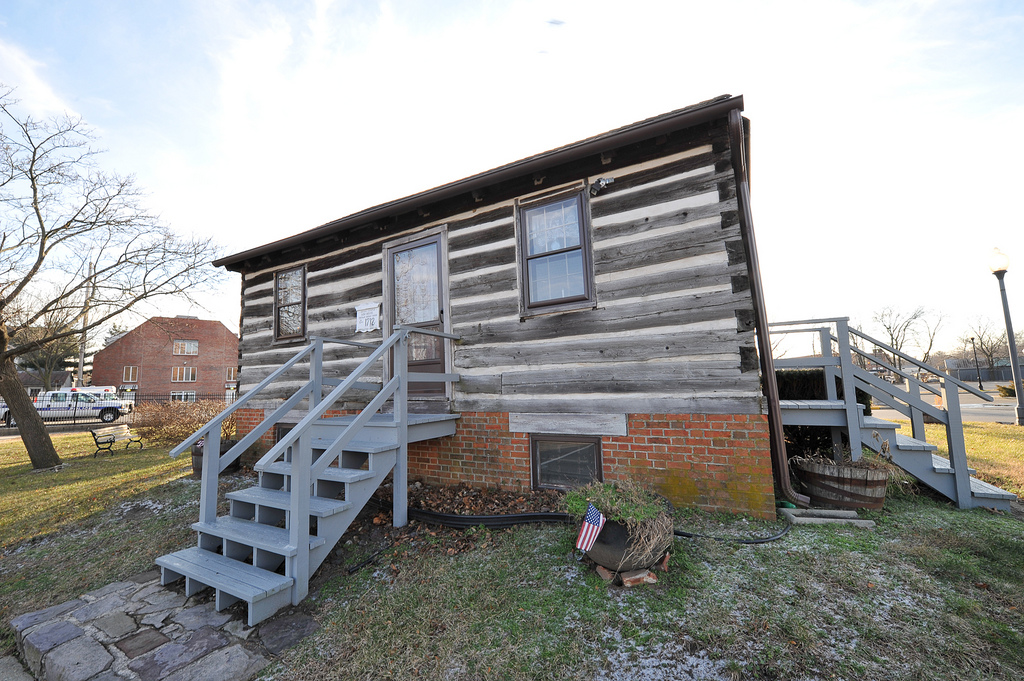
Thomas Shinn Home, built in 1712

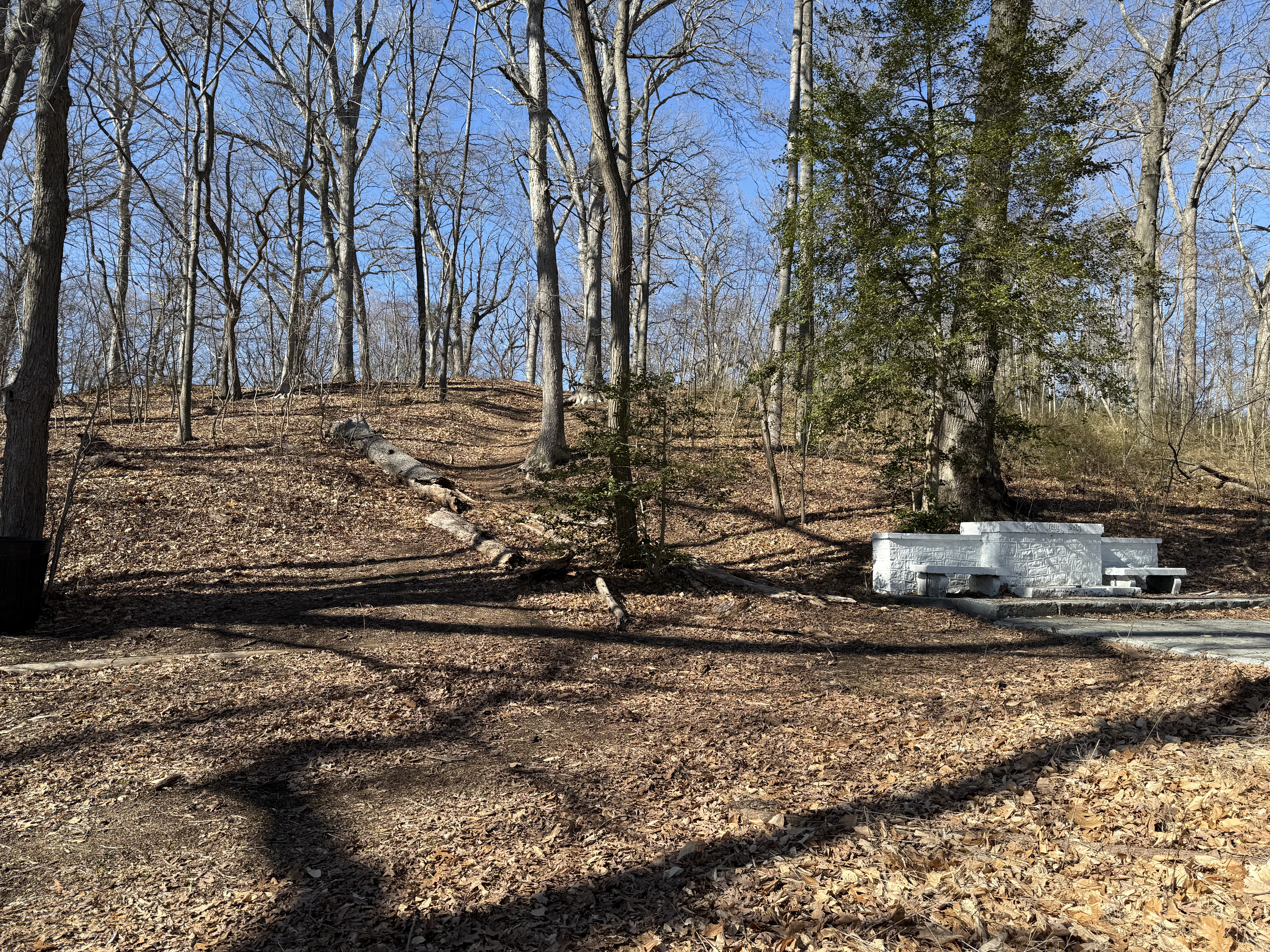
"The Mount", Mount Holly's namesake hill, with accompanying altar used by local churches

- The Mount Park, encompassing the town's namesake hill
- Burlington County Courthouse, 1796
- Mount Holly Cemetery
- Shinn Curtis Log House, constructed out of hand-hewn logs, the house was built in 1712; the original log house was uncovered in 1967. A larger house that had been built around it was demolished, revealing the early house beneath, which has been restored.
- Burlington County Prison, opened in 1811, it was the oldest continually operated prison in the country when it closed in 1965 after more than 150 years of service.
- First Presbyterian Church
- St. Andrew's Episcopal Church
- Friends Meeting House
- Brainerd Schoolhouse is a one-room schoolhouse that was constructed in 1759 and operated as a school for nearly 100 years. In 1951, the school was transferred from the Female Benevolent Society, which had owned and operated the site for 136 years, to the National Society of the Colonial Dames of America.
- Relief Fire Company No. 1, home of the oldest continuously operating volunteer fire company in the United States.
- Thomas Budd House is the township's third-oldest house, dating to 1744.
- Stephen Girard House was the home of Girard, who moved to Mount Holly shortly after his marriage in 1777 and purchased the partially completed house, as recorded in 1779.
- John Woolman Memorial was constructed in the late 1700s on a portion of an orchard that had belonged to Woolman.

== In popular culture ==
The pop punk band The High Court from the township released the 2007 album Puppet Strings.

The horror film Human Hibachi 2: Feast in The Forest was filmed in 2022.

== Notable people ==
People who were born in, residents of, or otherwise closely associated with Mount Holly include:

- James William Abert (1820–1897), soldier, explorer, ornithologist and topographical artist
- Casey Bahr (born 1948), soccer player
- Gamaliel Bailey (1807–1859), journalist and early abolitionist
- Cindy Birdsong (born 1939), singer who became famous as a member of The Supremes in 1967, when she replaced co-founding member Florence Ballard
- Anthony S. Black (born 1951), jockey and Kentucky Derby winner
- Charles C. Black (1858–1947), Associate Justice of the New Jersey Supreme Court who was the Democratic nominee for Governor of New Jersey in 1904
- Zach Braddock (born 1987), pitcher who has played for the Milwaukee Brewers
- Shaun Bradley (born 1997), American football linebacker for the Philadelphia Eagles
- Catherine A. Costa (1926–2025), politician who represented New Jersey's 7th legislative district in the New Jersey General Assembly from 1982 to 1984 and in the New Jersey Senate from 1984 to 1990
- Samuel A. Dobbins (1814–1905), represented New Jersey's 2nd congressional district in the United States House of Representatives from 1873 to 1877
- Paul Doguereau (1908–2000), pianist
- Barrows Dunham (1905–1995), professor of philosophy who was fired in 1953 by Temple University after refusing to answer questions posed by the House Un-American Activities Committee
- Doug Easlick (born 1980), fullback who played in the NFL for the Miami Dolphins in the 2004 season
- Matthew Emmons (born 1981), sport shooter who won a gold medal in the 50-meter rifle prone event at the 2004 Summer Olympics in Athens
- Pat Fidelia (born 1959), former professional soccer player
- Samuel C. Forker (1821–1900), represented New Jersey's 2nd congressional district in the United States House of Representatives from 1871 to 1873
- Mike Freeman (born 1961), former guard who played in the NFL for seasons with the Denver Broncos and Los Angeles Raiders
- Irving Fryar (born 1962), former Philadelphia Eagles football player
- Dan Gakeler (born 1964), former MLB pitcher who played for the Detroit Tigers during the 1991 season
- Joseph H. Gaskill (1851–1935), judge on the New Jersey Court of Common Pleas and Justice of the New Jersey Supreme Court from 1893 to 1896
- Ron Gassert (1940–2022), former football player for the University of Virginia and the Green Bay Packers
- John F. Gerry (1926–1995), former chief United States district judge on the United States District Court for the District of New Jersey
- Ed Gillespie (born 1961), Republican political strategist who was a senior advisor to Mitt Romney's 2012 presidential campaign and former Counselor to the President for George W. Bush
- Stephen Girard (1750–1831), merchant, banker, philanthropist, and humanitarian
- Louis Greenwald (born 1967), member of the New Jersey General Assembly since 1996
- Bessie Pease Gutmann (1876–1960), artist and illustrator
- Franco Harris (1950−2022), former Pittsburgh Steelers football player. Ranked #3 on the Sports Illustrated list of The 50 Greatest New Jersey Sports Figures
- Pete Harris (1957–2006), All-American safety at Penn State University
- Dwight Hicks (born 1956), defensive back who played in the NFL for the San Francisco 49ers and Indianapolis Colts
- Edward Young Higbee (1810–1871), Episcopal clergyman who served as Chaplain of the United States Senate
- Ernest Hilbert (born 1970), poet, opera librettist and rare book dealer
- Peter Hill (1767–1820), former slave who was the first African American clockmaker
- David Johnson (born 1964), rifle shooter who won a gold medal in the 10m air rifle event at the 1991 Pan American Games and competed at the 1992 Summer Olympics
- Erika Kemp (born 1996), distance runner, who specializes in the marathon and half marathon
- Ruth G. King (born 1933), educational psychologist who was the first woman to serve as president of the Association of Black Psychologists
- Leslie E. Kobayashi (born 1957), Judge of the United States District Court for the District of Hawaii
- Kevin Landolt (born 1975), defensive tackle who played one season in the NFL for the Jacksonville Jaguars in 1999
- Isabeau Levito (born 2007), figure skater who won the 2023 U.S. Figure Skating Championships and the 2024 World Figure Skating Championships silver medalist
- Geraldine Clinton Little (1923–1997), poet
- Mary Lum (1758–1815), moved here with her husband Stephen Girard in 1777 before being committed for the rest of her life to the insanity ward at Pennsylvania Hospital in 1785
- Ricky Lumpkin (born 1988), NFL defensive tackle for the Oakland Raiders
- Britt McHenry (born 1986), sports reporter
- John A. Nagy (1946–2016), author of nonfiction history books on espionage and mutinies during the American Revolution
- Barbara Park (1947–2013), author of children's literature best known for her series of books starring the character Junie B. Jones
- Barry T. Parker (1937–2023), politician who served in the New Jersey General Assembly and State Senate
- Frank Parsons (1854–1908), professor, social reformer and public intellectual
- Charles Sreeve Peterson (1818–1889), founder of Morgan Valley, Utah, and co-founder of Mormon colonies in Mexico
- Jeremy Riddle (born 1977), Christian music singer
- Samuel K. Robbins (1853–1926), politician who served as Speaker of the New Jersey General Assembly and President of the New Jersey Senate
- William Rossell (1760–1840), judge on the United States District Court for the District of New Jersey
- Jim Saxton (born 1943), former representative from New Jersey's 3rd congressional district
- Thomas C. Sharp (1818–1894), newspaper publisher and outspoken opponent of Joseph Smith who was charged (and acquitted) in the death of Smith
- Charles V. Shank (born 1943), physicist who served as the director of the Lawrence Berkeley National Laboratory from 1989 to 2004
- Robert C. Shinn Jr. (born 1937), politician who served in the New Jersey General Assembly from the 8th Legislative District from 1985 to 1994
- Alexander E. Shiras (1812–1875), US Army brigadier general
- Michael Sis (born 1960), sixth bishop of the Roman Catholic Diocese of San Angelo in Texas
- Harrison Slater, pianist and mystery writer
- Michelle Smith (born 1972/1973), fashion designer
- José F. Sosa (born 1950), politician who was mayor of Mont Holly and served in the New Jersey General Assembly from 1992 to 1994
- Alonzo Spellman (born 1971), defensive lineman who played in the NFL for the Chicago Bears, Dallas Cowboys and Detroit Lions
- Earl W. Stafford (born 1948), entrepreneur and philanthropist
- John L. N. Stratton (1817–1889), member of the United States House of Representatives from New Jersey
- John C. Ten Eyck (1814–1879), politician who represented New Jersey in the United States Senate from 1859 to 1865
- M. Louise Thomas (1822–1907), social reformer
- DeMya Walker (born 1977), professional basketball player
- Barclay White (1821–1906), Superintendent of Indian Affairs during the administration of president Ulysses S. Grant
- John Woolman (1720–1772), noted Quaker essayist and preacher, early anti-slavery advocate
