= Burlington County Prison =

- U.S. National Register of Historic Places
- U.S. National Historic Landmark
- U.S. Historic district – Contributing property
- New Jersey Register of Historic Places
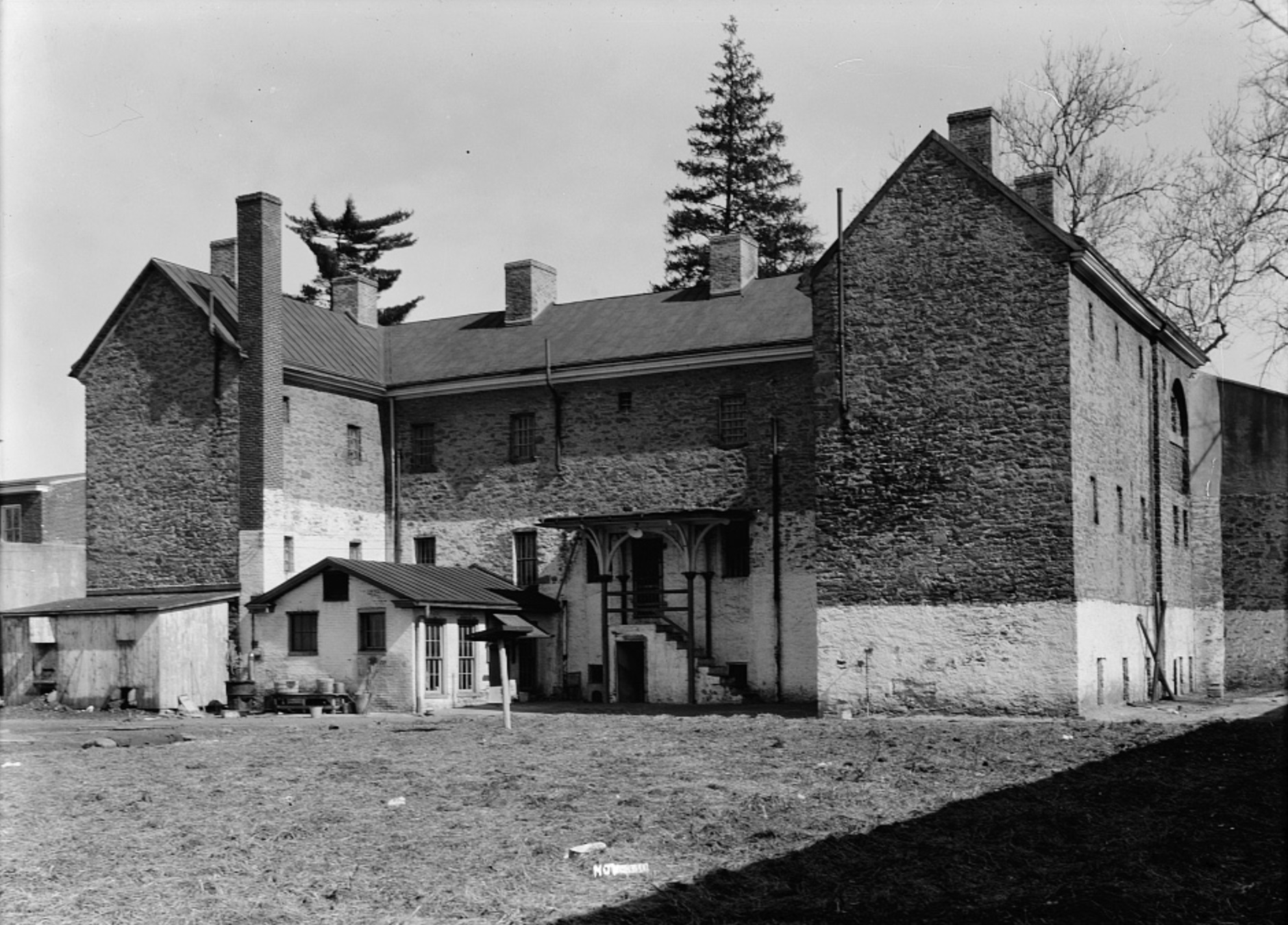
- Burlington County Prison, HABS photo from 1937

- Location within Burlington County, New Jersey Location within New Jersey Location within the United States
- Location: 128 High Street, Mount Holly, New Jersey
- Coordinates: 39°59′47.4″N 74°47′23.03″W
- Built: 1810
- Architect: Robert Mills
- Part of: Mount Holly Historic District (ID73001084)
- NRHP reference No.: 86003558
- NJRHP No.: 841

Significant dates
- Added to NRHP: June 24, 1986
- Designated NHL: June 24, 1986
- Designated CP: February 20, 1973

The Burlington County Prison is a historic museum property, located at 128 High Street in Mount Holly in Burlington County, New Jersey, United States. Operating from 1811 to 1965, it was the oldest operating prison in the nation at the time of its closure. Designed by Robert Mills, its design exemplified period thinking in progressive prison design, with individual cells, good ventilation, and fireproof construction. It was documented by the Historic American Buildings Survey (HABS) in 1937. Now operated by a local nonprofit as a museum, it was designated a National Historic Landmark in 1986. It was later listed as a contributing property of the Mount Holly Historic District on February 20, 1973.

== Description and history ==
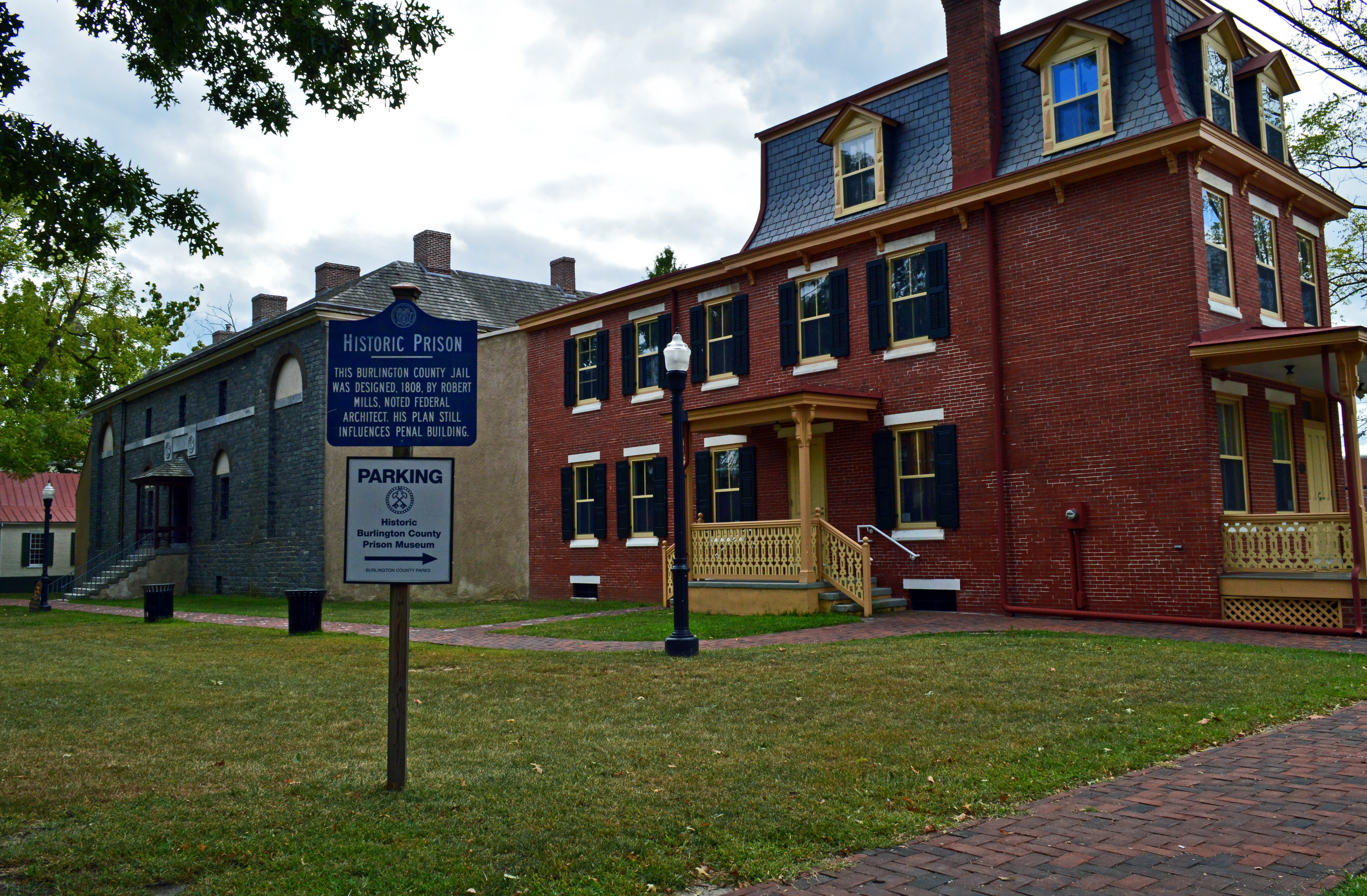
A later building in the prison/jail complex

The former Burlington County Prison is located north of downtown Mount Holly, on the west side of High Street south of Grant Street. It is a three-story masonry structure, built out of ashlar-finished stone and covered by a hip roof. It is in a U shape, with two wings extending to the rear at either end of the street-facing central section. Sash windows are set in recessed openings, some of which are topped by blind rounded arches. The main entrance is sheltered by a modern portico, and features a heavy wooden door with strap hinges, box locks, and a peephole. The interior passageways are finished in brick, while the cells have wooden floors. Some cells were larger, designed to hold multiple debtors (not considered to be dangerous), and a cell for extremely dangerous prisoners is located on the top floor, featuring surviving wall-mounted shackles.

Construction began on the prison in 1810, and its first prisoners were admitted in 1811. The building was designed by Robert Mills, a protégé of Benjamin Latrobe who had recently completed a design on a prison in South Carolina (which was not executed). Its design reflected the latest ideas in prison design, which arose from movements to reform notoriously poor British prisons. The motto over the door, "Justice Which, While it Punishes, Would Endeavor to Reform the Offender", was chosen by architect Robert Mills. The Burlington County Prison operated from 1811 through 1965. When it closed in 1965, it was the oldest operating prison in the United States. It was converted into a museum soon thereafter.

It is reportedly haunted by a tall male in a uniform in the basement, and the third floor is claimed to have a flurry of paranormal activity.

== See also ==
- List of National Historic Landmarks in New Jersey
- National Register of Historic Places listings in Burlington County, New Jersey
- List of museums in New Jersey
- List of the oldest buildings in New Jersey
