= Royal Robbins (minister) =

American minister

Royal Robbins (October 21, 1788 – March 26, 1861) was an American minister.

He was son of Elisha and Sarah (Goodrich) Bobbins, and was born in Wethersfield, Connecticut. He graduated from Yale University in 1806. On leaving College he taught school in Hadley, Massachusetts, and in Berlin, Connecticut, studied law for a time with his uncle, Hon. Asher Bobbins of Newport, Rhode Island, then prepared himself for the ministry under the tuition of Rev. Dr. Porter of Catskill, New York and Rev. Dr Yates of East Hartford, Connecticut, was licensed in 1812 by the Hartford North Association, and was ordained June 26, 1812, colleague pastor with Rev. Dr. Upson, over the Congregational Church in Kensington, Connecticut. In this station he continued forty three years, until his dismissal June 26, 1859.

He was an industrious writer, and contributed many valuable papers to the Christian Spectator. He was the author of Outlines of History for schools, a memoir of J. G. C. Brainard, prefixed to an edition of his poems, and of an account of American Literature incorporated with Chambers' History of English Literature.

One of his printed sermons was A Discourse Preached on the First Sabbath of the Year, including Remarks on the Death and Character of Deac. Roswell Moore (1857).

He was twice married and left a widow and six children. He died in Berlin (Kensington parish), aged 72.

== Publications ==
Robbins’ publications include;

- Outlines of modern history, on a new plan. (1830)
- Outlines of ancient and modern history, of a new plan, embracing biographical notices of illustrious persons, and general views of the geography, population, politics, religion, military and naval affairs, arts, literature, manners, customs, and society, of ancient and modern nations (1835)
- The poems of John G. C. Brainard. A new and authentic collection, with an original memoir of his life. (1847)
