= Brainard, California =

Unincorporated community in California, United States

Brainard
- Unincorporated community
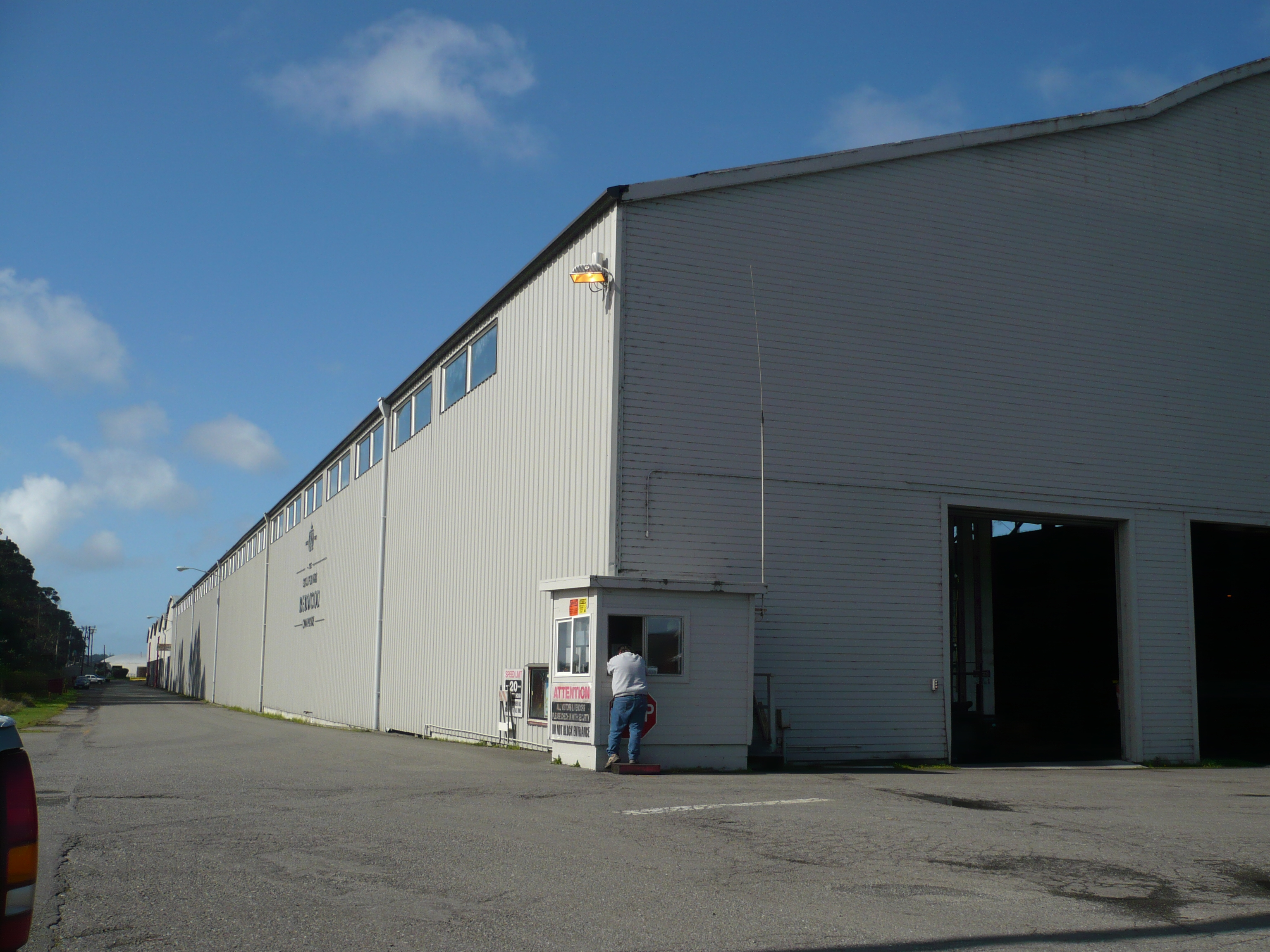
- The California Redwood Company mill in Brainard

- Location in California
- Coordinates: 40°48′43″N 124°06′37″W
- Country: United States
- State: California
- County: Humboldt
- Elevation: 6.6 ft (2 m)

Brainard is an unincorporated community in Humboldt County, California, United States. It is located on the Northwestern Pacific Railroad, 4 miles (6.4 km) south-southwest of Arcata, at an elevation of 7 feet (2 m).
