= Jeremiah Gates Brainard =

American judge (c. 1759–1830)

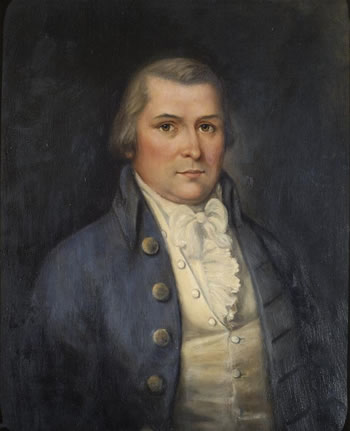
Jeremiah Brainard

Jeremiah Gates Brainard (c. 1759 – January 14, 1830) was a justice of the Connecticut Supreme Court from 1808 to 1829.

Originally elected to the court following the adoption of a new state constitution in 1807, Brainard was the only judge whose tenure survived a political purge in 1817:

The Toleration party, a combination of all the elements hostile to the Federalists and the Congregational Establishment, whose watchword was a new Constitution, carried the elections in the fall of 1817. The Constitution, which was adopted in the following year, reduced the number of the judges from nine to five. Owing to the excellence of the old court, and the fact that most of the lawyers, always a conservative class, were Federalists, there was much anxiety to see what kind of a court could be formed by the Tolerationists from their scant material. It was hoped that some of the old judges would be retained; but all were retired by the Tolerationist Legislatures, except Judges Hosmer and Brainard. Judge Brainard, though a Federalist, was retained owing to the support of some of the Tolerationists from his own county. He was a quiet, business-like judge, who had been a member of the court from 1807, and continued in service for ten years after the enforced retirement of his colleagues.

Brainard was the father of poet John Gardiner Calkins Brainard. Brainard "resigned his place on the bench in 1829, his health not being equal to the duties of the office, having served as judge for twenty-two years". He died in New London, Connecticut, the following year, at the age of seventy.

Political offices
Preceded by Newly constituted court.	Justice of the Connecticut Supreme Court; 1808–1829	Succeeded by Clark Bissell
