= Brainerd diarrhea =

- Specialty: Infectious disease
- Causes: Unknown

Brainerd diarrhea is a sudden-onset watery, explosive diarrhea that lasts for months and does not respond to antibiotics; the cause of Brainerd diarrhea is unknown. Brainerd diarrhea was first described in Brainerd, Minnesota in 1983. It has been associated with the consumption of raw milk and untreated water. Of the ten outbreaks reported since 1983, nine have been in the U.S. The characteristics of each outbreak have been similar to that caused by an infectious agent.

Although a comparatively large outbreak (117 patients) occurred in 1996 in Fannin County, Texas, the largest outbreak (122 patients) was the original one in Brainerd, MN. There have been no secondary cases reported in any of the outbreaks, suggesting that the causative agent cannot be passed from person to person, but boiling water appears to inactivate the Brainerd agent. Although there is no treatment available, the disease does appear to resolve itself, although this process takes months if not years.
