= Mary Gardiner Brainard =

American poet

Mary Gardiner Brainard (June 19, 1837 – November 30, 1905) was an American writer of religious poetry.

== Biography ==
Mary Gardiner Brainard was born in New London, Connecticut. She was daughter of William Fowler Brainard (1784-1844), a New London lawyer, whose uncle was the poet John Gardiner Calkins Brainard, and his second wife Sarah Ann Prentis.

Her poem "Not Knowing" first appeared in The Congregationalist, March 1869, and was set to music as a hymn by Philip Paul Bliss in the 1870s.
