= Elizabeth L. Brainerd =

American biologist

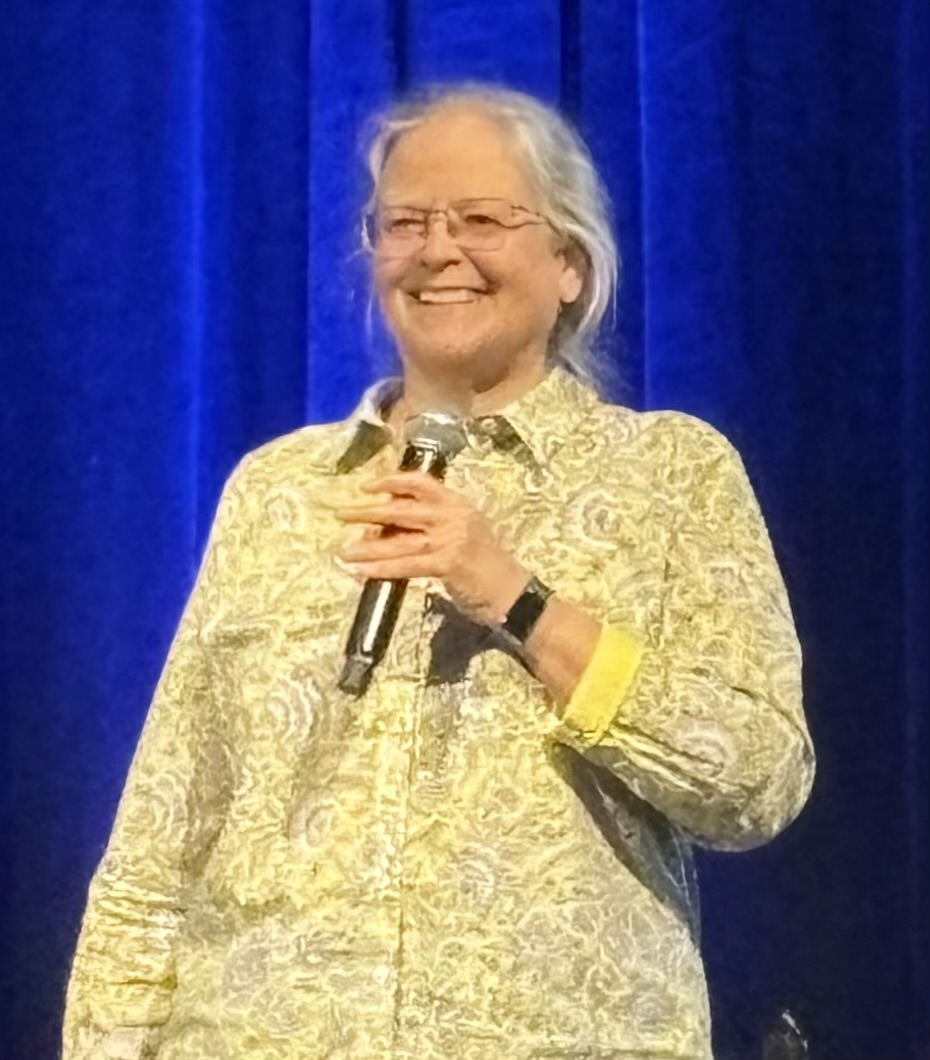
- Elizabeth L. Brainerd speaking at Anatomy Connected in March 2025.
- Born: 1963 (age 62–63)
- Citizenship: American
- Education: Harvard University
- Known for: XROMM technology, biomechanics of vertebrates
- Awards: Joseph S. Nelson Lifetime Achievement Award in Ichthyology (2021), Bidder Prize Lecture (2023), Fellow of the American Association for the Advancement of Science
- Scientific career
- Fields: Vertebrate biomechanics, evolutionary biology
- Workplaces: Brown University, University of Massachusetts Amherst
- Doctoral advisor: Karel F. Liem
- Other academic advisors: Farish Jenkins, Alfred (Fuzz) Crompton
- Doctoral students: Adam P. Summers, Nathan Kley, Andrea Ward, Manny Azizi, Ariel Camp, Nick Gidmark, Brian Nowroozi, Yordano Jimenez, Elska Kaczmarek, Jeremy J. Lomax, Hannah Weller

Elizabeth L. Brainerd (born 1963) is an American biologist who has contributed to our understanding of the evolution of breathing and the biomechanics of vertebrates. She is one of the inventors of XROMM (X-ray Reconstruction of Moving Morphology), a technique for making 3D movies of internal structure that combines CT scanning with biplanar x-ray movies. She is one of the authors of Great Transformations in Vertebrate Evolution.

Brainerd is the Robert P. Brown Professor of Biology professor of Biology and of Medical Science in the Ecology and Evolutionary Biology Department at Brown University, Providence, Rhode Island.

== Early life and education ==
She was born in 1963 to Lyman and Susan Brainerd. She attended the Putney School in Vermont, then Harvard University, where in 1985 she graduated with an AB. She joined the lab of Karel F. Liem at Harvard where she earned a Ph.D. in 1991. She then moved to Tom McMahon's lab for her post doctoral work as a Junior Fellow in the Harvard Society of Fellows (1990–1993).

== Academic career ==
In graduate school Brainerd's mentors included Indonesian born ichthyologist Karel F. Liem and the paleontologists Farish Jenkins and Alfred (Fuzz) Crompton. Brainerd's first academic appointment was at the University of Massachusetts – Amherst (1994–2006). She then moved to Brown University where she runs the Functional Morphology and Biomechanics lab and teaches human gross anatomy in the medical school. She has been the president of the International Society of Vertebrate Morphologists and the Society for Integrative and Comparative Biology.

=== Honors ===
Brainerd is a Fellow of the American Association for the Advancement of Science. She has won the Dean's Award for Excellence in Graduate Mentoring (2015) and in 2018 was selected as a Gilliam Fellowship Mentor by the Howard Hughes Medical Institute. In 2020 she was named the Robert P. Brown Professor of Biology and became a fellow of the American Association for Anatomy. In 2021 she won the Joseph S. Nelson Lifetime Achievement Award in Ichthyology. In 2023 she gave the Bidder Prize Lecture for the Society for Experimental Biology.

== Selected works ==
She has published more than 100 peer reviewed publications. Highlights include the realization that breathing is two separate events, inhalation and exhalation; how lizards (and dinosaurs) run and breathe at the same time; The invention of the 'Ram-Suction index' for studying prey capture; and the contribution of vertebral number and joint flexibility of C-starts in fishes. She described the inflation mechanism of puffer fish and the x-ray movies she generated were used by Pixar in animating the character Bloat in Finding Nemo.
