= Ingrid Brainard =

American historian

Ingrid Greta Brainard (née Kahrstedt; 10 November 1925 – 18 February 2000) was a musicologist, dance historian, performer, and teacher of historical dance. She contributed significantly to the development of the fields of dance history in general and early dance history in particular.

== Early years, education, and training ==
Born in Göttingen, Germany, Ingrid Greta Kahrstedt began her studies of the performing arts in early childhood. Interested in all forms of dance, she took instruction in ballet, modern dance, mime, and Baroque dance when she was still a schoolgirl. In the early 1940s, during World War II, she was a student at the Hochschule für Musik Mozarteum in Salzburg, Austria, where she focused on voice training but also studied keyboard, opera, acting, and directing. In 1950–1951, after peace had returned to Europe, she continued her studies in mime with the famous Marcel Marceau in Paris. Then, moving on to the Georg-August-Universität Göttingen, she majored in musicology in a curriculum that included theater studies as well as German and English literature. While pursuing graduate studies at the university, she met and married fellow musicologist Paul Brainard in 1953.

== Scholarly career ==
In 1956, Ingrid Brainard earned a doctoral degree at Göttingen with a dissertation entitled Die Choreographie der Hoftănze der Burgund, Frankreich und Italien im 15. Jahrhundert ("The Choreography of the Court Dances of Burgundy, France, and Italy in the Fifteenth Century"). A few years later, in 1960, the Brainards moved to the United States and settled in Columbus, Ohio, where Paul Brainard had been offered a teaching position. Their stay there was brief, as they soon moved to the Boston area and established a residence in nearby Cambridge. Brainard's chief interest at this time was the study and reconstruction of early Renaissance dances, but her subsequent publications included many articles on the history of dance and on the costumes, theatrical practices, and iconography of later centuries. She published widely and frequently, in both German and English, in such scholarly journals as Die Musikforschung, Dance Research Journal, Dance Chronicle, and Early Music as well as in major reference works on music and dance. Her articles on early music in The New Grove Dictionary of Music and Musicians (1980) are considered definitive, and her entries on early dance in the International Encyclopedia of Dance (1998) remain one of the best introductions to the subject yet available.

In 1969, Brainard founded the Cambridge Court Dancers, a semi-professional ensemble specializing in reconstruction and performance of authentic court dances from the early fifteenth to the eighteenth century. Active for many years, until 1996, the company was known for the accuracy of its choreographic recreations, based on dance instruction manuals of the times, as well as the manner and styles of movement and the design and construction of costumes. Brainard's concern and care for the way her dancers were dressed extended from headwear to footwear to underwear, as she thought that that too had an influence on how the dancers moved.

In addition to issuing scholarly publications and to directing a theatrical troupe, Brainard taught courses in music and dance at various institutions. One of the first fellows of the Radcliffe Institute for Advanced Study of Harvard University, she also taught at the New England Conservatory of Music, Mount Holyoke College, the Cambridge Center for Adult Education, the Dance Notation Bureau, Northeastern University, and the Longy School of Music of Bard College, a conservatory located in Cambridge, Massachusetts. She regularly presented research papers at scholarly meetings, especially the annual conferences of the International Medieval Congress held in Kalamazoo, Michigan, where she often organized the music sessions. She was also an active member of the Society of Dance History Scholars and of the Congress on Research in Dance, for which she served on the board of directors for eight years before being elected president in 1978. An affable, outgoing scholar, with a winning personality and a strong sense of humor, she was a popular speaker and organizer of many early music workshops and festivities.

Brainard died at her home in West Newton, Massachusetts, at the age of 74. A memorial service for her, attended by many friends and colleagues in the dance and theater communities, was held on 24 February 2000.

== Published works ==
=== Books ===
- Three Court Dances of the Early Renaissance. With coauthor Ray Cook. New York: Dance Notation Bureau Press, 1977.
- The Art of Courtly Dancing in the Early Renaissance. Privately printed, 1989.

=== Selected articles and papers ===
- "Bassedance, Bassedanza, and Ballo in the Fifteenth Century," in Dance History Research: Perspectives from Related Arts and Disciplines, edited by Joann W. Kealiinohomoku (New York, 1970).
- "Fifteenth and Early Sixteenth-Century Court Dances," in Institute of Court Dances of the Renaissance and Baroque Periods, edited by Juana de Laban. (New York, 1972).
- "The Role of the Dancing Master in Fifteenth-Century Courtly Society." Fifteenth Century Studies 2 (1979), 21.
- "The French Noble Style." Dance Chronicle 5.1 (1981), 98–106.
- "Modes, Manners, Movement: The Interaction of Dance and Dress from the Late Middle Ages to the Renaissance," in Proceedings of the sixth annual conference of the Society of Dance History Scholars, "Methods and Resources in Dance History," Ohio State University, Columbus, Ohio, 11–14 February 1983.
- "The Art of Courtly Dancing in Transition: Nurnberg, Germ.Nat.Mus.Hs.8842, a Hitherto Unknown German Source," in Crossroads of Medieval Civilization: The City of Regensburg and Its Intellectual Milieu, edited by Edelgard E. Dubruck and Karl Heinz Göller. Detroit: Michigan Consortium for Medieval and Early Modern Studies, 1984.
- "Mesura et arte del danzare: The Guglielmo Ebreo Conference at Pesaro," Dance Chronicle 11.1 (1987), 116–121.
- "Pattern, Imagery, and Drama in the Choreographic Work of Domenico da Piacenza," in Guglielmo Ebreo da Pesaro e la Danza nelle Corti Italiani del XV Seccolo, edited by Maurizio Padovan (Pisa, 1990).
- "The Art of Eighteenth-Century Gesture." Dance Chronicle 15.1 (1992), 94–98.
- "Medieval Instrumental Dance Music." Dance Chronicle 15.2 (1992), 237–243.
- "Guglielmo Ebreo's Little Book on Dancing, 1463: A New Edition." Dance Chronicle 17.3 (1994), 361–368.
- "Italian Dance Documents of the Fifteenth Century." Dance Chronicle 21.2 (January 1998), 285–297.
- "Renaissance Dance Technique" and numerous related articles, in International Encyclopedia of Dance, 6 vols., edited by Selma Jeanne Cohen and others (New York: Oxford University Press, 1998).
