= Brainerd (given name) =

Brainerd is a masculine given name which may refer to:

- Brainerd Currie (1912–1965), a law professor
- D. Brainerd Holmes (1921–2013), American engineer and business executive, president of Raytheon
- Brainerd Jones (1865–1949), American architect
- Brainerd Kellogg (1834–1920), American professor of rhetoric and English literature
- C. Brainerd Metheny (1889–1960), American football and basketball coach, college athletics administrator and insurance executive
