= John G. C. Brainard =

American lawyer, editor, and poet (1795–1828)

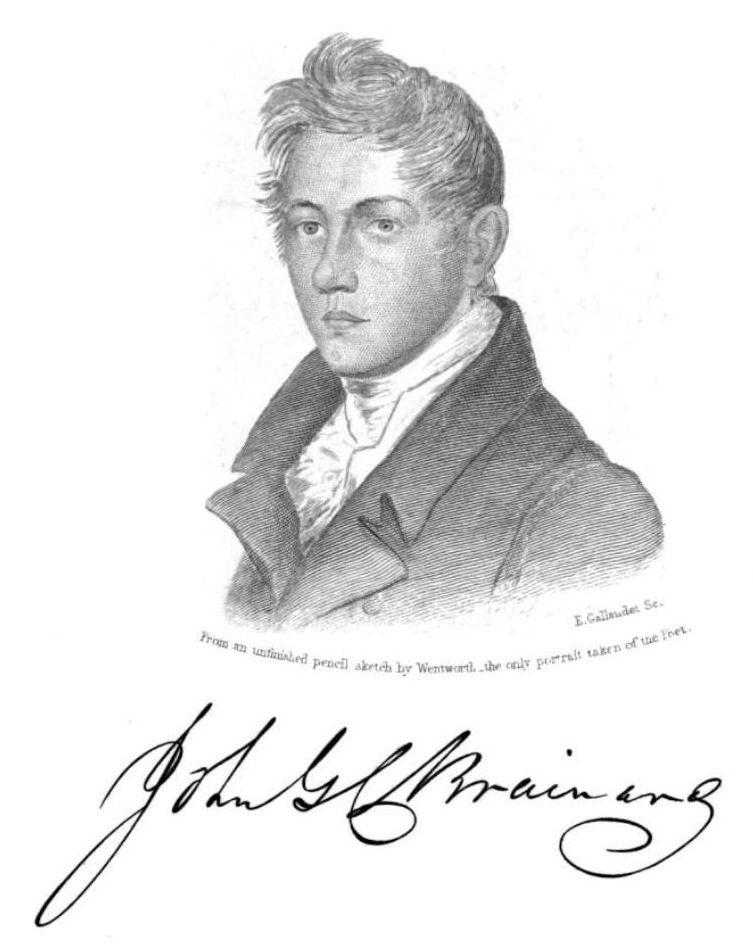
John Gardiner Calkins Brainard

John Gardiner Calkins Brainard (1795–1828) was an American lawyer, editor and poet.

== Biography ==
Brainard was born in New London, Connecticut, in October 1796, son of Jeremiah G. Brainard, formerly a judge of the Connecticut Superior Court. He was a descendant of Lion Gardiner, an early English settler and soldier, who founded the first English settlement in what became the state of New York. His legacy includes Gardiners Island, which remains in the possession of the family and is the largest privately owned island in the United States.

Brainard was tutored at home by an elder brother and entered Yale College at the age of 15 in 1811. Biographies agree that he was not an attentive student, and it is uncertain whether he graduated. Nevertheless, on leaving college he was taken on as a student at law in his brother William F. Brainard's office.

By 1819, he had been called to the bar and moved to Middletown, apparently to set up his own practice. In fact, he seems to have been apathetic about a legal career, feeling that his nature was too sensitive for such a profession. Some of his earliest poems are from this period of his life, published in a New Haven literary paper, The Microscope published by one Cornelius Tuthill.

In February 1822, he was engaged as editor of the Connecticut Mirror in a bid to further a literary career. Again, biographies agree that this was not the ideal job for him, and that "his temperament was totally unsuited to rough collissions of editorial controversy". In this role he published a number of his own works within the newspaper, which were well received and led to a literary reputation for Brainard.

He appears to have been well known and well thought of in his community. He is known to have been a friend of McDonald Clarke, the so-called "Mad poet of Broadway".

In 1824-5 he published a first volume, Occasional Pieces of Poetry by John G. C. Brainard, being reprints of works first published in the Mirror, together with a miscellany of unpublished poems.

By the spring of 1827, he was in failing health, suffering from tuberculosis. He returned to New London, giving up his Mirror role, but continuing to have poems published in it.

He died on September 26, 1828. A number of poets, including John Greenleaf Whittier, wrote poems in his memory. A posthumous The literary remains of J.G.C. Brainard: with a sketch of his life was published in 1832, and revised and republished by Rev. Royal Robbins as The poems of John G. C. Brainard. A new and authentic collection. A number of his poems are reprinted in collections of poems.

His poem, "On the Project of African Colonization", is quoted in Harriet Beecher Stowe´s book Uncle Tom's Cabin at the end of chapter XXXVII "Liberty" although without credit and reference.
