= John Grist Brainerd =

American computing pioneer

John Grist Brainerd (August 7, 1904 – February 1, 1988) was an American electrical engineer who served as principal investigator on the project to build ENIAC, the first general-purpose electronic digital computer. Later, he was dean of the Moore School of Electrical Engineering at the University of Pennsylvania.

Brainerd was born in 1904; he earned a bachelor's degree in electrical engineering from the University of Pennsylvania in 1925, and a Ph.D. in 1929. He became an instructor in the Moore school in 1925 and directed the school from 1954 to 1970. In 1970 he retired, as emeritus University Professor.

Brainerd's most famous contribution, with J. Presper Eckert, John Mauchly, and others, was the creation of ENIAC, the first general-purpose electronic digital computer. Although Eckert and Mauchly were the chief designers of ENIAC, Brainerd was selected as principal investigator of the ENIAC project, which took place between 1943 and 1946 at the Moore school. He also helped found the graduate program in electrical engineering at Penn, in 1927, and wrote two textbooks, High Frequency Alternating Currents (1931) and Ultra-High Frequency Techniques (1942). After retiring, he became president of the Society for the History of Technology.

Brainerd was the recipient of the IEEE Founders Medal in 1975 "for his leadership in electronics in fields encompassing computer technology, high frequency techniques, engineering education, and national and international electrical standardization."
