= Battle Birds =

American air-war pulp magazine (1932–1935)

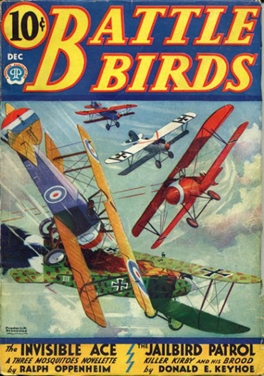
Cover of the first issue; art by Frederick Blakeslee

Battle Birds was an American air-war pulp magazine published by Popular Publications from 1932 to 1935 and from 1940 to 1944.

It was launched at the end of 1932, but did not sell well, and in 1934 the publisher turned it into an air-war hero pulp titled Dusty Ayres and His Battle Birds. Robert Sidney Bowen, an established pulp writer, provided the lead novel each month, and also wrote the short stories that filled out the issue. All of the cover art was painted by Frederick Blakeslee. Bowen's stories were set in the future, with the United States menaced by an Asian empire called the Black Invaders. The change was not successful enough to be extended beyond the initial plan of a year, and Bowen wrote a novel in which, unusually for pulp fiction, Dusty Ayres finally defeated the invaders, to end the series. The magazine ceased publication with the July/August 1935 issue.

It restarted in 1940, under the original title, Battle Birds, and lasted for another four years.

== Publication history ==
In mid-1927, Aviation Stories and Mechanics was launched. It was the first magazine to specialize in fiction about flying, and pulp magazine historian Robert Sampson suggests that Charles Lindbergh's flight across the Atlantic in May that year was part of the reason for public interest in aviation. Other similar magazines quickly appeared, including Air Stories and Wings, which focused on adventure stories involving flying. The first magazine to concentrate on aerial warfare was Dell Magazine's War Birds, which appeared in early 1928. In 1930 Popular Publications was started by Harry Steeger and Harold Goldsmith; the new company launched four pulp magazines that year, one of which was an air-war pulp titled Battle Aces. In 1932 they added a second title, Battle Birds, with the first issue dated December 1932.

In late 1933, Battle Aces was relaunched as a hero pulp titled G-8 and His Battle Aces, with the lead novels written by a single author, Robert J. Hogan. Robert Sidney Bowen, a pulp writer who was selling war fiction prolifically to multiple pulp magazines in the early 1930s, met with Steeger for lunch in 1933. Bowen was finding it tiresome to quickly write story after story with a different setting for each one, and told Steeger he wanted to be the author of a hero pulp magazine, like Hogan. Steeger agreed, and over lunch they settled on changing Battle Birds, which was selling poorly, to a hero pulp with Bowen as the author. They agreed on a year's trial, and for the run to be extended if the magazine sold well.

== Contents ==
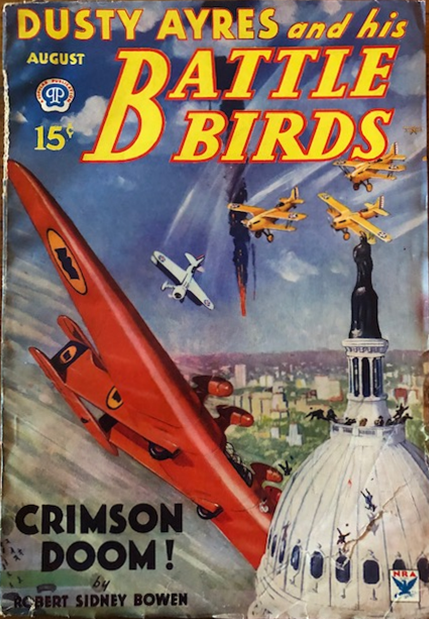
Cover of the August 1934 issue of Dusty Ayres and His Battle Birds, by Frederick Blakeslee

Rather than having the new magazine compete directly with G-8 and His Battle Aces, Bowen's stories were set in the future, with America at war with another power. To avoid having the war against an existing country, they decided to make the enemy a future power rising in Asia that had conquered the entire world except for the United States. Bowen's hero was named Dusty Ayres, and the magazine was retitled Dusty Ayres and His Battle Birds starting with the July 1934 issue. Ayres was America's top pilot, and along with three friends, Jack Horner, Curley Brooks and Biff Bolton, he fought the Asian Black Invaders. The enemy's leader, Fire Eyes, wore a plain green mask with two slits for eyes, through which sparks of fire could be seen. His lead pilot, Ayres' frequent antagonist, was known as The Black Hawk.

Bowen also wrote all the short stories for Dusty Ayres, unlike most hero pulps where several authors would provide the short fiction. The magazine included a letter column, and, starting in the February 1935 issue, a competition column called "Planes of Tomorrow" that highlighted the best reader-submitted design for a future airplane. The new magazine initially did well enough to inspire Dell Magazines to similarly transform War Birds into Terence X. O'Leary's War Birds in early 1935, adding a science-fictional background. Dusty Ayres lasted just one year. Bowen wrote a final novel in which the evil empire was defeated (unusually for a pulp series), and the magazine ceased publication with the August 1935 issue. Science fiction historian Mike Ashley suggests that Dusty Ayres was popular but that the setting was too limited for the series to continue for long; fellow historian Robert Weinberg asserts instead that sales were too low for the title to survive. Sam Moskowitz, another historian of the genre, describes the Dusty Ayres series as "fascinatingly imaginative in the art as well as the stories", but considers the writing weaker than that of contemporary pulps such as Operator #5. The magazine was relaunched in February 1940 under the original Battle Birds title, lasting for another four years in that incarnation.

The cover artist for all issues of both Battle Birds and Dusty Ayres was Frederick Blakeslee, an expert painter of airplanes who delighted in making the planes in his covers accurate, though for Dusty Ayres he was given the freedom to invent futuristic designs. Robert Lesser, in his history of pulp magazine art, comments that during World War II the air-war magazine artists "realized that they were no longer painting fiction but recording fact", and gives as an example Blakeslee's cover for the October 1942 cover of Battle Birds, which depicted Douglas dive bombers bombing Japanese aircraft carriers at the Battle of Midway. Lesser also quotes a letter to Battle Birds from a US private working as ground crew, asking for a Blakeslee painting that they could hang in their barracks for morale; according to the response in the magazine, Popular agreed and sent them a painting.

== Bibliographic details ==
Issue data for Battle Birds
	Jan	Feb	Mar	Apr	May	Jun	Jul	Aug	Sep	Oct	Nov	Dec
1932												1/1
1933	1/2	1/3	1/4	2/1	2/2	2/3	2/4	3/1	3/2	3/3	3/4	4/1
1934	4/2	4/3	4/4	5/1	5/2	5/3	5/4	6/1	6/2	6/3	6/4	7/1
1935	7/2	7/3	7/4	8/1	8/2		8/3					
1940		1/1	1/2		1/3		1/4		2/1		2/2	
1941	2/3		2/4		3/1			3/2		3/3		3/4
1942		4/1		4/2		4/3		4/4		5/1		5/2
1943			5/3		5/4		6/1		6/2		6/3	
1944	6/4		6/5		6/6							
Issues of Battle Birds, showing volume and issue number.

Battle Birds was published by Popular Publications. It began as a monthly, running from December 1932 to July 1934, and remained monthly after the title changed to Dusty Ayres and His Battle Birds in July 1934. It lasted for 12 issues under the new title; the last two issues were bimonthly, dated May/June and July/August 1935. There was then a gap of several years until February 1940 when the title changed back to Battle Birds. The next issue, March 1940, inaugurated a bimonthly run that lasted until the final issue, dated May 1944, with a couple of irregularities: May 1941 was followed by August 1941, and December 1942 was followed by March 1943. The volume numbering was consecutive until the end of the Dusty Ayres period: there were seven volumes of four issues each, followed by one volume of three issues. The volume numbering restarted at 1/1 with the February 1940 issue; this time there were five volumes of four issues, and a final volume of six issues.

The magazine was pulp format throughout. It began at 128 pages and 10 cents, the price rising to 15 cents in September 1933 and dropping back to 10 cents in February 1940 when the title reverted to Battle Birds. The page count also dropped at that time, first to 112 pages, and eventually to 82 pages by the final issue. When the magazine was relaunched in February 1940, it was under Popular's Fictioneers imprint. Bibliographic sources do not list the editor for individual Battle Birds, but editorial policy for all magazines was set by Harry Steeger, and Rogers Terrill had broad responsibility for Popular Publications' pulps.

In 1965 and 1966, Corinth Books published about fifty paperback editions of novels and short stories drawn from several magazines, including four Dusty Ayres novels, and a collection of Bowen's short stories from the magazine:

- Black Lightning (originally published in the July 1934 issue)
- Crimson Doom (August 1934)
- Purple Tornado (September 1934)
- The Telsa Raiders (July/August 1935)
- Battle Birds Versus the Black Invaders (short stories)

== Sources ==
- Ashley, Mike (2000). The Time Machines: The Story of the Science-Fiction Pulp Magazines from the beginning to 1950. Liverpool: Liverpool University Press. ISBN 0-85323-865-0.
- Cheng, John (2012). Astounding Wonder: Imagining Science and Science Fiction in Interwar America. Philadelphia, Pennsylvania: University of Pennsylvania Press. ISBN 978-0-8122-4383-3.
- Goulart, Ron (1973) [1972]. An Informal History of the Pulp Magazines. New York: Ace Books. ISBN 0-441-37070-5.
- Hardin, Nils (July 1977). "An Interview with Henry Steeger". Xenophile (33): 3–18.
- Hulse, Ed (2013). The Blood 'N' Thunder Guide to Pulp Fiction. Morris Plains, New Jersey: Murania Press. ISBN 978-1491010938.
- Johnson, Tom (1983). "Dusty Ayres and His Battle Birds". In Cook, Michael L. (ed.). Mystery, Detective, and Espionage Magazines. Westport, Connecticut: Greenwood Press. pp. 204–205. ISBN 0-313-23310-1.
- Lesser, Robert (1997). Pulp Art. New York: Gramercy Books. ISBN 0-517-20058-9.
- Moskowitz, Sam (1983). "Anatomy of a Collection: The Sam Moskowitz Collection". In Hall, Hal W. (ed.). Science/Fiction Collections: Fantasy, Supernatural and Weird Tales. New York: The Haworth Press. pp. 79–110. ISBN 0-917724-49-6.
- "The Golden Fleece". Newsweek. 31 (24): 61. June 14, 1948.
- Roberts, Tom (2017). "Above the Clouds & in the Trenches". In Ellis, Douglas; Hulse, Ed; Weinberg, Robert (eds.). The Art of the Pulps: An Illustrated History. San Diego, California: Elephant Book Company. pp. 72–91. ISBN 978-1-68405-091-8.
- Sampson, Robert (1993). Yesterday's Faces Volume 6: Violent Lives. Bowling Green, Ohio: Bowling Green State University Popular Press. ISBN 0-87972-615-6.
- Tuck, Donald H. (1982). The Encyclopedia of Science Fiction and Fantasy Through 1968 Volume 3: Miscellaneous. Chicago: Advent: Publishers, Inc. ISBN 0-911682-26-0.
- Weinberg, Robert (1985a). "Dusty Ayres and His Battle Birds". In Tymn, Marshall B.; Ashley, Mike (eds.). Science Fiction, Fantasy and Weird Fiction Magazines. Westport, Connecticut: Greenwood Press. pp. 194–196. ISBN 0-3132-1221-X.
- Weinberg, Robert (1985b). "G-8 and His Battle Aces". In Tymn, Marshall B.; Ashley, Mike (eds.). Science Fiction, Fantasy and Weird Fiction Magazines. Westport, Connecticut: Greenwood Press. pp. 289–290. ISBN 0-3132-1221-X.
