= Pauline Kruetzfeldt =

Illustrator and painter

- Born: Pauline Woelf [Wulf] January 12, 1890; Holstein, Germany
- Died: October 29, 1960 (aged 70); Benedict Memorial Hospital, Ballston Spa, New York
- Occupation(s): Painter and illustrator
- Spouse: William Kruetzfeldt

Pauline Kruetzfeldt (January 12, 1890 – October 29, 1960) was a New York-based illustrator and painter.

== Biography ==
Kruetzfeldt was born January 12, 1890, in Holstein, Germany, to Christian and Johanna Woelf. At the age of seven, her family moved to New York City, where she would study art at the Arts Students League. Her instructors included George Bridgman, Edward Dufner and Ben Foster. At some point, she married fellow German émigré William Kruetzfeldt, and gave birth to their son, William H. Kruetzfeldt. The family moved to rural New York, where she would live for the rest of her life. Kruetzfeldt died on October 29, 1960, in Ballston Spa, New York.

== Career ==
Kruetzfeldt's work consisted primarily of flowers, trees, landscapes and animals. Her first published pen and ink drawings appeared in Ladies' Home Journal, and her paintings covered issues of American Home, Woman's Home Companion, Country Gentlemen, Hygeia, Better Homes and Gardens, American Girl, Camp Fire Girls and a catalogue for Wanamaker's, one of the first department stores in the United States. She worked freelance and as a contractor for Crowell Publishing Co. and Hearst, and her illustrations were used in greeting cards, school textbooks and by the State Conservation Department. Beyond her commercial work, Kruetzfeldt appeared in exhibitions at the National Arts Club, the Syracuse Museum of Fine Arts, the Grand Central Art Gallery, the American Water Color Society, the Institute of History and Art in Albany and the Ogonquit Art Gallery.

Her archive is kept at the Betty Boyd Dettre Library and Research Center at the National Museum of Women in the Arts.
