= Franklin Rowe =

American fashion designer

Franklin Rowe is an American fashion designer.

== Biography ==
Rowe was born in the Bronx. He attended Fiorello H. LaGuardia High School and earned a scholarship to attend Traphagen School of Fashion. After graduation he lived briefly in Albuquerque, New Mexico before returning to New York City a few years later.

In 2013, he rebooted his brand after a car accident that led to a 6-year hiatus.

He has worked as celebrity designer, dressing Taye Diggs, Mary J. Blige, Grace Jones, Dionne Warwick, and Queen Latifah, among others.

South Florida Times described his style as "African-American [with] elegant Euro sensibilities". He operates two boutiques, in Atlanta and New York City.
