= Traphagen School of Fashion =

Former art school in New York City

Coordinates: 40.763094°N 73.982781°W

- Other name: Traphagen School of Design
- Active: 1923–1991
- Founder: Ethel Traphagen Leigh
- Location: 1680 Broadway, New York City, New York, United States

Traphagen School of Fashion was an art and design school in operation from 1923 to 1991, and was located at 1680 Broadway in New York City. The school was founded and directed by Ethel Traphagen Leigh (1883–1963) with a focus on the foundational concepts of the American design movement. This was one of the earliest fashion schools and played a role in the development of American fashion by educating over 28,000 students in 68 years of operation.

== History ==
Traphagen School of Fashion was founded in 1923 by Ethel Traphagen Leigh (1883–1963) with a focus on the foundational concepts of the American design movement.

Traphagen School encouraged student experimentation with materials and construction techniques. One of the educational tenets of the Traphagen School of Fashion was a "design-by-adaptation" method, which included historical research. The school had a large collection of books and historic fashion plates, which was a source of inspiration for student work. The "design-by-adaptation" method often resulted in the appropriation of fashion in different cultures, including Native American and African American fashion.

The semi- quarterly alumni magazine was called Fashion Digest, highlighting industry partnerships, honors and work by alumni.

In March 2019, the Museum at Fashion Institute of Technology (FIT) hosted a survey exhibition of the school, The Traphagen School: Fostering American Fashion.

== Alumni ==
=== Actors, entertainment industry ===
- Edie Adams, comedienne, actress, singer, businesswoman, and Tony Award winner.

=== Fashion designers ===
- Geoffrey Beene, (class of 1947, Costume Design) fashion designer.
- Hazel Rodney Blackman (class of 1946), Jamaican-born American fashion designer
- Luis Estévez, (class of 1951, Costume Design) Cuban-born American fashion designer, costume designer.
- James Galanos, (class of 1943, Costume Design) fashion designer.
- Stan Herman, (class of 1952, Costume Design) fashion designer of corporate uniforms.
- Victor Joris, (class of 1945, Costume Design and Sketching) fashion designer known for women's apparel and pioneering pantsuits and long coats.
- Anne Klein, (attended c. 1937–1938, Costume Design), fashion designer.
- John Kloss, (class of 1958, Costume Design) fashion designer, known for lingerie and sleepwear designs.
- Robert Knox (1908–1973), fashion designer at Ben Gershel.
- Helen Lee, (class of 1926, Costume Design) fashion designer for children's clothing. Her own line, Designs by Helen Lee Inc., was established in 1955.
- Maurice Levin, (class of 1949, Costume Design) fashion designer for Jantzen, and West Coast mid-century modern fashion for men and women.
- Mary McFadden, (class of 1956, Costume Design) fashion designer.
- Arthur McGee, (class of 1951, Costume Design) fashion designer, first African American designer working in design studio on Seventh Avenue in the Garment District in New York City.
- Franklin Rowe, fashion designer.
- Carolyn Schnurer (class of 1939, Costume Design) fashion designer and a pioneer in American sportswear.

=== Illustrators ===
- Antonio Lopez (illustrator) (class of 1955, Illustration) Puerto Rican-born American fashion illustrator.
- Esta Nesbitt, (class of 1937, Illustration) fashion illustrator and xerox artist.
- Robert William Meyers (1919–1970), magazine and children's book illustrator.
- Ann Kempner Levere, worked in several Manhattan pattern companies including Simplicity Pattern in the 1950s and 60s.

=== Painters ===
- Nela Arias-Misson, Cuban-American abstract expressionist painter.
- Mavis Pusey, (attended c. 1946) Jamaican abstract painter, printmaker.

=== Other ===
- Carolyn Cassady, (attended c. 1943) author associated with Beat Generation.
- Vera Neumann, (class of 1926, Illustration and Textile Design) textile artist and entrepreneur, known for her scarves.
- Gladys Parker, (class of 1928, Illustration) cartoons and comics artist.
- Tatjana Wood, (née Weintraub;1926 – 2026) was an American artist and comic book colorist. Wood did extensive work for DC Comics as a comic book colorist, also working alongside her husband, Wally Wood on his illustrations.

== Faculty ==
- Alon Bement (1876–1954), served as Dean of Traphagen between 1946 until 1951, where he taught interior design courses.
- Edward Dufner, painter
