= Hazel Rodney Blackman =

Jamaican American textile artist (1921–2014)

- Born: Hazel Hyscinth Rodney; April 19, 1921; Kingston, Jamaica
- Died: May 14, 2014 (aged 93); Kingston, Jamaica
- Resting place: Dovecot Memorial Park, Kingston, Jamaica
- Education: Traphagen School of Fashion
- Occupations: Fashion designer; Quilter

Hazel Rodney Blackman (1921–2014) was a Jamaican-born American fashion designer, quilter, and painter. She is best known for introducing African fabrics into American fashion in the 1960s and 1970s.

== Early life and education ==
Hazel Blackman was born Hazel Hyscinth Rodney in Kingston, Jamaica in 1921, to George and Alphasenia Rodney. She was the third of eleven children, including brothers Winston, Neville, Karl and sisters Ivy, Joyce, Winifred and Marcia. She grew up on Slipe Pen Road, in the city's Cross Roads Neighborhood. In that neighborhood, she often encountered Marcus Garvey and members of his Universal Negro Improvement Association, whose headquarters were at nearby Edelweiss Park. Her grandfather, George Rodney, owned stock in Garvey's Black Star Line, a connection that would surface in her later work. Blackman described her mother as a great sewer.

In 1940, Blackman moved from Jamaica to New York to attend the Traphagen School of Fashion in Manhattan. After she graduated, in 1946, she worked as a seamstress, private dressmaker, and sample maker on Seventh Avenue in Manhattan. By the time she struck out on her own, in 1965 she had become an assistant designer. During her years working in the garment district, she continued to take classes, including on jewelry-making, painting on fabrics, and glove-making.

== Fashion career ==
Blackman started putting on fashion shows as early as 1952, when she gave a show of burlap designs titled "Hazel's Adventures in Cotton." In 1967, asked for advice, she said, "Negro designers should go to school and upon graduation get into the mainstream of fashion, even if it's clipping threads."

Starting in the 1960s, Blackman was a member of the Congress of Racial Equality.

In the 1960s Blackman's business partner Lionel Phillips brought fabric samples back from a trip to Africa. She started designing with these fabrics as a hobby, and in 1964 her clothing was featured in the New York State Pavilion of the 1964 World's Fair. Demand for her designs grew enough that in 1965 she and Phillips started a boutique, The Tree House, on East 147th Street in Manhattan. The boutique was an "instant hit", according to Ebony Magazine in 1966. Blackman was widely quoted as saying, "Let other designers go to Paris for inspiration, I'll take Africa." In 1965, the Chicago Defender newspaper called her "probably the only American fashion designer that specializes in African batik." Blackman and Phillips imported African fabrics from various countries, including kanga and kitenge fabrics made at Tanzania's government-owned Friendship Textile Mill, cobra skin from Morocco, and Akwete cloth from Nigeria. In one interview in 1970, Blackman told a reporter that a "dress she designed from hand woven cloth geometrically designed in colors of green, gold and beige is the very last fabric to be had from Biafra."

In the late 1960s, the Denim Council, a trade group, noticed Blackman's unique African fabric designs and asked her to design new looks in denim. She also produced designs for the National Cotton Council. The resulting combination of imported fabrics and new denim fabrics became a signature part of her aesthetic. Blackman produced a variety of styles, from jumpsuits and bell-bottom pants to skirts, dresses, and jackets, made in this unique hybrid style.

Her boutiques stocked her designs as well as African-made clothing imported by Phillips from Liberia. Blackman also sold clothing to other boutiques in New York City, as well as stores in Washington, D.C., St. Louis, Kansas City, Portland, and San Francisco. In 1969, Blackman opened a second Tree House boutique, at 286 Lenox Avenue in Harlem, but a series of robberies in the summer after the store's opening convinced her to close it.

As one reporter put it, Blackman's fashions at the Tree House "were later to get reams of publicity when done by other people." She once noted that "I never thought that an American fashion business could be built on a djellaba."

In 1967, Blackman was "the only non-white designer showing at the New York Couture Business Council's show for press women," a precursor to New York Fashion Week.

In 1968, Blackman's designs were featured in the Harlem Cultural Festival's "Fashion '68" show at Mount Morris Park Harlem. In 1969, her designs were featured in the Schaefer brewing company's traveling "Show of Stars," a prominent fashion show whose theme that year was "fashion-power," showcasing African American designers.

Blackman's notable clients included Nina Simone, who reportedly enjoyed her evening gown designs, as well as Marjorie Harding, the prominent wife of New York City's first Black fire chief, Robert O. Lowery. Her designs were featured in Vogue, Glamour, Ebony, and The New Yorker, among other fashion publications. Blackman was also a member of New York City Mayor John Lindsay's Cultural Development Committee.

In 1970, Blackman visited San Francisco to help start two fashion and design cooperatives, in San Francisco and in Oakland. In the 1970s, Blackman also taught at the Jackson Community Center and Senior Citizens Cottage Industry.

Blackman told one reporter, "African fabrics defy the laws of design. Stripes are uneven and not equidistant from each other. It's enough to drive a designer absolutely mad. And yet, it fascinates me!" Reflecting on her business in 1971, Blackman said, "I've always had the problem of capital, and I suppose I could have gone much further if I had found backing when I was starting out. However, I've enjoyed what I've done."

== Quilting career ==
Blackman began quilting after a trip to Alabama in the 1960s, where she made designs for the Federation of Southern Cooperatives, a quilting cooperative, and in the process was inspired to take up the craft herself. Decades later, she helped found the New York chapter of the Women of Color Quilters Network.

In a 2005 interview, Blackman said, "to make a dynamic quilt is like a dance," and reflected that "making quilts is the last of my episode." She made several story quilts, including ones that depicted Jamaican history, such as her quilt "The Black Star Liner," which shows a ship from Marcus Garvey's shipping company. Her quilt, "Unity of the Mind," which depicts Garvey and Ethiopian emperor Haile Selassie, is in the collection of Liberty Hall: The Legacy of Marcus Garvey, a museum in Kingston.

== Poetry and prose ==
One of Blackman's quilts is featured on the cover of Patchwork: Poetry & Prose and Papers & Pictures Anthology book (1999) by Dale Benjamin Drakeford. Several of Blackman's original poems are featured in the anthology. Blackman also wrote an unpublished autobiography titled My Romance with Paint and Fabrics.

== Death ==
Blackman returned to Jamaica after living decades in the Bronx, New York, then in Tampa, Florida. She died at 93 and is buried at Dovecot Memorial Park in Kingston, Jamaica.
