= Maurice Levin =

American fashion designer

Maurice Levin (January 6, 1926 – August 30, 2007) was an American fashion designer, working in both men's and women's fashion in the 1950s through 1970s. He worked as a designer for Jantzen, Alex Colman of California, American Cyanamid, and Catalina.

== About ==
Maurice Levin was born in 1926 in New York City, New York. He graduated in Costume Design from Traphagen School of Fashion in 1949. After graduation Levin moved to Los Angeles to attend University of California, Los Angeles (UCLA) majoring in Social Science with curriculum in Apparel Design. In the 1950s he worked for the Jantzen swimwear brand, and popularized the trend of the color pink worn on men. He won two Caswell-Massey awards for design.

His work is in various public museum collections including the Los Angeles County Museum of Art (LACMA), among others. Fashion Institute of Design & Merchandising Museum's Special Collections has a Maurice Levin Archive.
