= Red Randall Series =

The Red Randall series was a 1940s, boys war adventure series by R. Sidney Bowen. Like the Dave Dawson War Adventure Series, this series pertained to World War II, specifically the Pacific Theatre of the war. The main character, Red Randall, serves throughout the book series as a military aviator. The books contain frequent deviation from history, such as a Fifth Column Japanese base on the Hawaiian Islands, during the air raid on Pearl Harbor.

== Red Randall Series ==
| Year | Title |
|---|---|
| 1944 | Red Randall at Pearl Harbor |
| 1944 | Red Randall on Active Duty |
| 1944 | Red Randall over Tokyo |
| 1944 | Red Randall at Midway |
| 1944 | Red Randall on New Guinea |
| 1945 | Red Randall in the Aleutians |
| 1945 | Red Randall in Burma |
| 1946 | Red Randall's One-Man War |

== See also ==
- The Red Randall Series
