= Frederick Blakeslee =

American illustrator and draftsman (1898–1973)

- Born: December 4, 1898; Buffalo, New York, U.S.
- Died: 5 March 1973 (aged 74); Danville, Vermont, U.S.
- Occupation: Illustrator

Frederick Blakeslee (December 4, 1898 – March 5, 1973) was an American illustrator.

== Biography ==
He was born in Buffalo, New York, to Bertha and Harland Manley Blakeslee, and had a younger sister, Helen, born in 1908.

When Blakeslee was 12 years old, Glenn Curtiss started a flying school in Buffalo, and in 1915 opened an aeroplane factory near Blakeslee's home. Blakeslee worked for Curtiss as an assistant draughtsman in the design department, and was able to join test flights and learn more about the planes. He took night classes at Albright Art School in draughting and design skills, and also learned color theory and composition from teachers Lucius W. Hitchcock and Edward Dufner. Blakeslee's goal was to become an aviation designer, but he had to take introductory classes in drawing human figures.

He registered for the national draft on September 12, 1918, but the war ended soon afterwards and he was never inducted. Curtiss reorganized his business once the war was over, and Blakeslee became a designer for the Curtiss-Sperry Company. Being transferred to a Brooklyn factory in 1921, he then studied at the Pratt Institute of Brooklyn and then qualifying in 1926 as a professionally certified draftsman. While there he studied under Harold Winfield Scott, and made friends with several others who became well-known illustrators, including Walter M. Baumhofer and Rudolph Belarski. While a student at Pratt, he met and became engaged to Lorna Jones, a pupil in the librarian program and they married June 21, 1930. By 1927 he began taking on freelance art work, and then was commissioned to create the book jacket for Ernest Miltion's first novel, To Kiss the Crocodile.

By 1929 Blakeslee was painting pulp covers. His first was a cover for War Stories. At around this time he got engaged to Lorna Jones, but she contracted tuberculosis and the wedding had to be delayed until after two years of treatment. They were married on Jun 21, 1930.

During the 1930s Blakeslee was creating covers for most of the pulp magazines that focused on aviation. His closest business relationship was with Henry Steeger, and from the mid 1930s most of Blakeslee's work was sold to Popular. From 1943, when Popular acquired Railroad Magazine, Blakeslee also began painting steam trains. In WWII, he served in the U.S. Coast Guard Reserve as a Seaman 1st Class on routine coastal patrols for Nazi U-Boats.

After the war, Blakeslee returned to his earlier occupation as a technical drawer of engineering specifications for the gyroscope division of Sperry-Rand Corporation at nearby Lake Success, New York, where he worked for 15 years, then retiring in 1963, where he and his wife moved to Danville, Vermont, where he painted landscapes of the White Mountains until his death of a heart attack on March 5, 1973. He was survived by Lorna, who died on March 29, 1978. They had no children.

== Sources ==
- Saunders, David (2007). "Frederick Blakeslee (1898-1973)". The Red Falcon: The Dare-Devil Aces Years Volume 2. By Hogan, Robert J. Orchard Park, New York: Age of Aces Books. pp. 214–248. ISBN 978-0-9794092-3-3.
- Saunders, David (Spring 2008). "Frederick Blakeslee (1898-1973)". Illustration. pp. 16–50.
