= Carolyn Schnurer =

American fashion designer

Carolyn Schnurer (born in New York City as Carolyn Goldsand on January 5, 1908 and died on March 15, 1998, in Palm Beach, Florida) was a fashion designer and a pioneer in American sportswear. Schnurer's designs have been featured in the magazines Vogue, Harper's Bazaar, and Life as well as in the Metropolitan Museum of Art. She has also received awards for her designs from Coty, The Cotton Council, International Sportswear, Miami Sportswear, and Boston Sportswear.

== Early life and education ==
Carolyn Schnurer was born in New York City on January 5, 1908, as Carolyn Goldsand.

As a young woman, Schnurer studied at the New York Training School for Teachers. She taught art and music at a public school, where she would occasionally design styles as part of her work. She married Harold Teller "Burt" Schnurer, a bathing suit designer, in 1930, who encouraged her to pursue fashion design instead of teaching. Schnurer received her B.S. degree from New York University (NYU) in 1941.

Schnurer studied fashion at the Traphagen School of Fashion class of 1939 in Costume Design.

== Fashion career ==
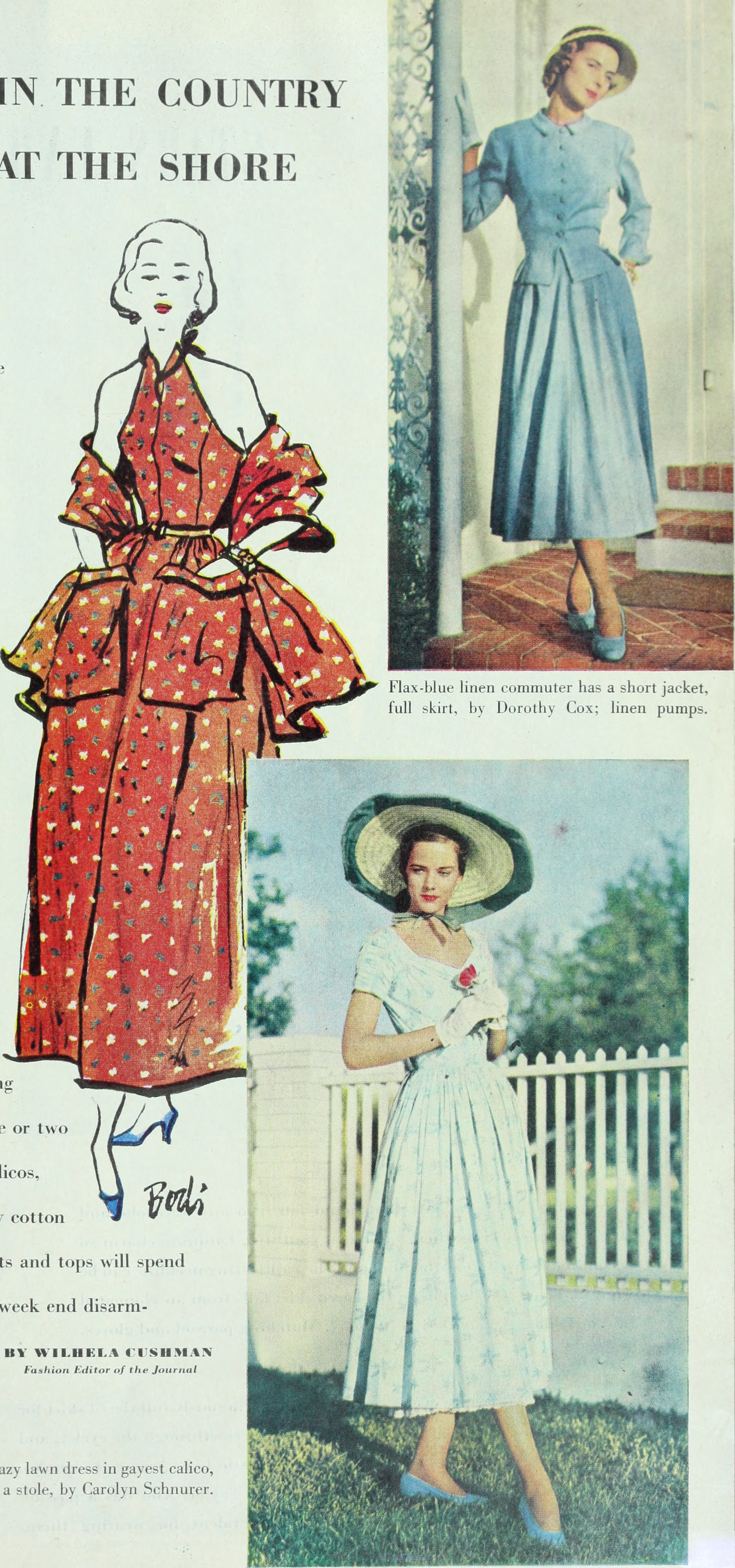
Red dress and stole by Carolyn Schnurer, Ladies' Home Journal, 1948

Carolyn Schnurer is best known for her beach and play clothes, particularly her cotton bathing suits as opposed to the more common knit bathing suits.

Schnurer was also noted for her culturally-inspired resort collections. According to the Metropolitan Museum of Art, Schnurer's globally inspired designs were not costumes, they "typically featured one or two understated thematic details in the cut or fabric, while maintaining a classic American silhouette."

In 1944, Schnurer traveled to the Andes for inspiration. According to the Milwaukee Journal, she covered "15,000 air miles of mountainous roads" during the trip. Schnurer's Andes-inspired collected was presented in 1945 as "Serrano Fashions." The fashions used fabric familiar to American consumers in a range of light and dark colors. The cholo coat and pollera skirt were considered particular highlights of the collection.

Over the years, Schnurer traveled to France, Ireland, Turkey, Japan, Hong Kong, Myanmar, Ghana, South Africa, and India for inspiration. According to Richard Martin of the Metropolitan Museum of Art, Schunrer was a "devoted researcher" who consulted museum experts before creating her collection.

In 1956, Schnurer's fashion line was reportedly making seven million dollars a year in sales.

== Schnurer in the textile industry ==
Carolyn Schnurer was successful in textile design as well as fashion design because of her unique textiles. Her clothing materials were often praised in American Fabrics, a popular magazine founded in 1949 which featured samples of various fabrics. In addition to her own line, Schnurer also designed fabrics for ABC fabrics during the early 1950s.

Examples of her textiles can be found in the Metropolitan Museum of Art's collection:

- Textile 1
- Textile 2

== Later life and legacy ==
Schnurer's fashion career spanned twenty years, lasting from 1944 until her retirement in 1964.

Carolyn Schnurer encouraged leisure time for the average American woman through her popular casual clothing designs. She also encouraged American fashion designers to take influences from cultures outside of America and to a lesser extent Europe. In 2016, an embroidered, elephant-motif top by Carolyn Schnurer opened "The Women of Harper's Bazaar" exhibit at Gallery FIT.
