= War Birds =

American air war pulp magazine

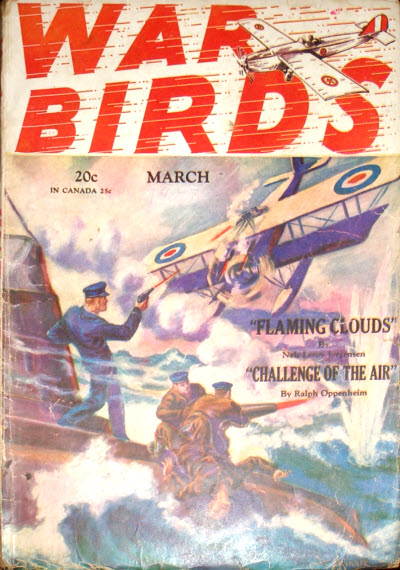
Cover of the first issue, by Chris Schaare

War Birds was a pulp magazine published by Dell from 1928 to 1937. It was the first pulp to focus on stories of war in the air, and soon had competitors. A series featuring fictional Irishman Terence X. O'Leary, which had started in other magazines, began to feature in War Birds in 1933, and in 1935 the magazine changed its name to Terence X. O'Leary's War Birds for three issues. In these issues the setting for stories about O'Leary changed from World War I to the near future; when the title changed back to War Birds later that year, the fiction reverted to ordinary aviation war stories for its last nine issues, including one final O'Leary story. The magazine's editors included Harry Steeger and Carson W. Mowre.

== Publication history and contents ==
War Birds was launched in March 1928 by Dell Publishing Co., Inc. It was initially successful, and, according to pulp magazine historian Ed Hulse, it published "some of the best air-story scribes in the country". It was the first pulp magazine to focus on air war, and when it became apparent it was successful, other publishers quickly started similar titles: Flying Aces and Aces both appeared in 1928. In the July 1933 issue Arthur Guy Empey's "O'Leary, Sky Hawk" appeared: this featured Terence X. O'Leary, a red-headed Irish soldier who had already been the protagonist of multiple appearances in the pulp magazines War Stories and Battle Stories. Empey rewrote O'Leary's backstory to make him a pilot who had flown with the Royal Flying Corps, and over a dozen more O'Leary stories appeared in War Birds over the next two years. O'Leary was a member of the "Black Wings Pursuit Squadron", described by pulp magazine historian Robert Sampson as "one of those weird organizations common to pulp war fiction. [Each man] in the squadron..has a long prison sentence hanging over his head, unless he fights fiercely". Sampson considers the O'Leary stories to be the worst air war series in the pulps; he describes them as "a sublime monument to meretriciousness". Hulse similarly considers the quality of these stories to be poor, and suggests that Mowre printed them only because of reader loyalty to the character. In March 1935 the magazine's title was changed to Terence X. O'Leary's War Birds, and the magazine switched to the science fiction genre in an attempt to revitalize it; in Sampson's opinion, these novels "offered some of the worst prose in all the hero pulps". There were three science fiction issues, each featuring a novel by Empey in which O'Leary fought the immortal Ageless Men from Atlantis in planes of the future. Science fiction historian Robert Weinberg comments that "the quality of the science fiction was scarcely a step above the comic book. While good writing was not a prerequisite for success in the pulps, terrible writing usually doomed a magazine". After three issues the title changed back to War Birds, and nine more issues appeared. There was one final O'Leary story, in the October 1935 issue, with the setting changed back to World War I. The final issue was dated October 1937.

Other writers who appeared in War Birds included Arthur J. Burks, Robert J. Hogan, Robert Sydney Bowen, William E. Barrett, Frederick C. Painton, and Lester Dent. The cover artists included George Rozen, Sidney Riesenberg, Rudolph Belarski, and Eugene Frandzen.

== Bibliographic details ==
Issues of War Birds showing volume/issue number
Year	Jan	Feb	Mar	Apr	May	Jun	Jul	Aug	Sep	Oct	Nov	Dec	Dec (2)
1928			1/1	1/2	1/3	2/4	2/5	2/6	3/7	3/8	3/9	4/10	4/11
1929	4/12	5/13	5/14	5/15	6/16	6/17	6/18	7/19	7/20	7/21	8/22	8/23	8/24
1930	9/25	9/26	9/27	10/28	10/29	10/30	11/31	11/32	11/33	12/24	12/35	12/36	13/37
1931	13/38	13/39	14/40	14/41	14/42	15/43	15/44	16/46	16/47	16/48	17/49		
1932	17/50	17/51	18/52	18/53	18/54	19/55	19/56			19/57		20/58	
1933		20/59	20/60	21/61	21/62	21/63	22/64	22/65	22/66	23/67	23/68	23/69	
1934	24/70	24/71	24/72	25/73	25/74	25/75	26/76	26/77	26/78	27/79	28/80	29/81	
1935	29/82	29/83	30/84	30/85		30/86				31/87		31/88	
1936								32/1		32/3			
1937		32/3		33/1		33/2		33/3		34/1			
Harry Steeger was editor of some early issues. Carson Mowre was editor until at least the October 1935 issue.

The publisher was Dell Publishing Co. Inc. through the run. Some early issues were edited by Harry Steeger, who left Dell in 1930 to form Popular Publications. Most issues were edited by Carson W. Mowre, who left the magazine not long before the end of its run. (Note: Hulse does not give an exact date, but says Mowre left "a few months after" the October 1935 issue.) The first issue was dated March 1928, and the last was dated October 1937; it was monthly for most of its life, with an extra issue in December for the first three years, except for a couple of gaps in 1932 and 1933, and an irregular period from 1935 to the end. The title was War Birds for all except three issues: the March, April and June 1935 issues were retitled Terence X. O'Leary's War Birds. It was priced at 20 cents until the March 1933 issue, which was 10 cents; thereafter the price varied between 10 cents, 15 cents, and 20 cents. The first issue was 128 pages; the page count varied between 128 and 144 pages for most of its run, with several issues of 96 pages appearing in 1933, two of 112 pages in 1935, and a final issue of 116 pages. A Canadian reprint edition appeared of the July 1934 and April 1935 issues.

== Sources ==
- Hulse, Ed (2013). The Blood'n'Thunder Guide to Pulp Fiction. Morris Plains, New Jersey: Murania Press. ISBN 978-1491010938.
- Sampson, Robert (1993). Yesterday's Faces Volume 6: Violent Lives. Bowling Green, Ohio: Bowling Green State University Popular Press. ISBN 0-87972-615-6.
- Weinberg, Robert (1985). "Terence X. O'Leary's War Birds". In Tymn, Marshall B.; Ashley, Mike (eds.). Science Fiction, Fantasy, and Weird Fiction Magazines. Westport CT: Greenwood Press. pp. 277–284. ISBN 0-313-21221-X.
