= Arthur McGee =

American fashion designer (1933–2019)

- Born: March 25, 1933; Detroit, Michigan, U.S.
- Died: July 1, 2019 (aged 86); New York City, New York, U.S.
- Education: Traphagen School of Fashion, Fashion Institute of Technology
- Years active: 1960s–1980s
- Known for: Fashion Design

Arthur Lee McGee (March 25, 1933 – July 1, 2019) was an American fashion designer. In 1957 he became the first African American designer to run a design studio on Seventh Avenue in the Garment District in New York City.

== Early life and education ==
Arthur Lee McGee was born on March 25, 1933, in Detroit, Michigan. His mother Rose was a dressmaker, who created her own original designs and taught her son about fashion in his early childhood. As his mother liked hats, a young McGee determined to learn hat making so he could gift her one.

He attended the Traphagen School of Fashion in New York City after winning a scholarship contest, graduating in 1951 in Costume Design. He continued his studies in millinery and apparel design at Fashion Institute of Technology (FIT). During this time he studied with the pioneering fashion designer Charles James. He dropped out of FIT in 1956 after being told there were no jobs for Black designers, with the Dean suggesting he look for work as a presser.

== Career ==
He spoke openly about poor treatment in design offices early on, where peers failed to recognize McGee as a fashion designer, even when he was dressed in designer clothing, due to his race. In his first jobs he was allowed to create designs and construct clothing, but disallowed from using his own name. Upon opening a small space in Greenwich Village and selling clothing to a few celebrities one weekend, McGee earned work from Broadway shows in need of costumes.

By 1957, at the age of 24, he was head of design at the women's fashion label Bobby Brooks, Inc. He was the first African American to hold this position at an established Seventh Avenue apparel company.

McGee's clothing designs drew inspiration from African and Asian fashion traditions, often featuring looser silhouettes and African textiles. He was most active from the 1960s through the 1980s. In 1960s he opened his own design store on St. Mark’s Place in New York City. During the 1960s and 1970s he worked for College Town of Boston, a collegiate themed women's apparel company. His designs were sold at major department stores including Saks Fifth Avenue, Bloomingdale’s, Henri Bendel, and Bergdorf Goodman, in many cases marking the first time these stores carried work by an African American designer.

Amongst his celebrity clients were stars such as Lena Horne, Sybil Burton, Cicely Tyson, and Stevie Wonder. He designed musician Dexter Gordon's custom suit for the 1987 Academy Awards, when he was received an Oscar nomination for his role in the film Round Midnight.

== Death and legacy ==
McGee died July 1, 2019, at the age of 86, in a nursing home in New York City after a long battle with illness.

McGee had been a mentor to fashion designer, Willi Smith. And McGee influenced many younger designers of the 1970s including, Stephen Burrows, Scott Barrie, B. Michael, Jeffrey Banks, and James Daugherty. His work is included in various public museum collections including the Metropolitan Museum of Art, National Museum of African American History and Culture, among others.

McGee's work was featured on the television show Antiques Roadshow (Season 24 Episode 30).
