= Esta Nesbitt =

- Born: Esther Feuerman; November 19, 1918; New York City, New York, U.S.
- Died: November 30, 1975 (aged 57); New York City, New York, U.S.
- Other name: Esta Feuerman Nesbitt
- Education: Traphagen School of Fashion, Columbia University, New York University
- Years active: 1940s–1970s
- Known for: Fashion Illustration, Xerox art
- Spouse: Saul Nesbitt (?–1975)

Esther "Esta" Nesbitt, born as Esther Feuerman (1918–1975), was an American illustrator, xerox artist, filmmaker, and educator. Between the 1940s until the 1960s, Nesbitt actively led a career as a fashion illustrator for leading magazines and newspapers including Harpers Bazaar, Mademoiselle, and the New York Times Magazine. In the 1960s she began experimenting with fine art, in multidisciplines and with xerox art.

== Biography ==
Esther Feuerman was born 19 November 1918 in New York City, New York. Nesbitt studied at the Traphagen School of Fashion, graduating 1937 in Illustration, working primarily in fashion illustration. She continued her studies at Columbia University, and New York University (NYU).

She was married to designer and sculptor, Saul Nesbitt (1920–1993). Between 1964 until 1974, Nesbitt was a professor at the Parson’s School of Design.

Starting in the 1960s she started to experiment with fine art, and by 1966 she was exhibiting her art. Nesbitt also illustrated a number of children's books starting in 1960. In the 1960s and 1970s, Nesbitt was one of the earliest artists experimenting with xerox art. She invent three xerography techniques, named transcapsa, photo-transcapsa, and chromacapsa. Nesbitt worked closely with Anibal Ambert and Merle English at Xerox Corporation and the company sponsored her art research from 1970 until 1972.

She died on 30 November 1975 in New York City, New York.

Her work is featured in various public art museum and library collections including, the Museum of Fine Arts, Houston, Brooklyn Museum, Archives of American Art, National Museum of American History, Digital Public Library of America, Smithsonian American Art Museum, Frances Neady collection at Fashion Institute of Technology, among others.
