= Anne Klein (fashion designer) =

American fashion designer

- Born: Hannah Golofsky; August 3, 1923; Brooklyn, New York, U.S.
- Died: March 19, 1974 (aged 50); New York City, U.S.
- Other name: Hannah Golofski
- Education: Traphagen School of Fashion
- Label: Anne Klein & Co
- Spouses: Ben Klein; Matthew Rubenstein

Anne Klein (born Hannah Golofsky; August 3, 1923 – March 19, 1974) was an American fashion designer, businesswoman, as well as a founder and the namesake of the Anne Klein & Company (owned by WHP Global as of July 2019).

She co-founded Anne Klein & Company in 1968 with Gunther Oppenheim, and within ten years, her designs were being sold in over 750 department stores and boutiques in the USA.

Her design career began in 1937, at the age of 14, when she was offered a scholarship to attend the Traphagen School of Fashion, which led to her first job as a sketcher for dress firms on 7th Avenue.

In 1948 she married clothing manufacturer Ben Klein, with whom she launched the Junior Sophisticates clothing line. Junior Sophisticates offered styles for younger women with smaller figures. Anne Klein was the principal designer there until 1960, when her marriage ended. In 1963, she married her second husband, Matthew "Chip" Rubinstein. Together, they founded Anne Klein & Company on 39th Street in 1968. She also opened the Anne Klein Studio on 57th Street. A large aspect of her brand is centered around the understanding of the average working women’s clothing needs, as well as women empowerment in the broader perspective.

Her journey was first recognized in 1954 with the Mademoiselle Merit Award, and further on, through numerous fashion awards and international recognition.

In 1967, she patented a girdle designed for the miniskirt.

In 1973, she was the only woman invited to participate in the Battle of Versailles, a competitive fashion show that pit five American designers against five French designers. The show was intended to raise money for the restoration of the Palace of Versailles

On March 19, 1974, Anne Klein died of breast cancer at Mount Sinai Hospital in New York, NY.

== Early life and education ==
Anne Klein was born on August 3, 1923, in Brooklyn, New York, as Hannah Golofski. Her father, Morris Golofski, owned a fleet of taxicabs; her mother was Esther Golofski. She had three sisters, Mae Waldman and twins Rita Kiviat and Jeanne Cohen. She was known to have said that she changed her name from Hannah to Anne because it was more aesthetically pleasing.

While studying fine arts and drawing at Girls' Commercial High School (now Prospect Heights High School), she discovered her talent for design. Anne Klein’s career began when she was only 15 years old working as a freelance sketcher at a wholesale house. Within a year, she was employed at her first official job in the garment industry with Varden Petites. There, she worked to redesign the firm's collection and introduced a new style of ready-to-wear clothing for young, smaller figured women that would come to be known as "Junior Miss".

In 1937 she was awarded a scholarship to attend the Traphagen School of Fashion, in the city of New York, where she started her fashion career, studying between 1937 and 1938. This led to her first job as a sketcher for dress firms on 7th Avenue.

== Fashion career 1940s and 1950s ==
Anne Klein’s schooling and efforts during her teenage years set her up on a promising career path. In 1940, Anne Klein began making a name for herself as a designer. She began by designing for Maurice Rentner at his business, Maurice Rentner, Inc., which produced ready-to-wear designs for men and women.

In 1944, Anne Klein joined Bonnie Cashin and Claire McCardell to later form a female design trio who laid the foundations of the fashion category American sportswear.

In 1948 she married clothing manufacturer Ben Klein. Together, they launched the Junior Sophisticates label. Junior Sophisticates offered elegant styles to young women with smaller figures. Anne Klein was the principal designer at Junior Sophisticates until 1960, when her marriage ended. During this period of ready-to-wear fashion, "modern" designs for women, and an increase in the number of working women, Klein became one of the first to introduce and be known for "separates"--individual pieces which work together as a whole, as opposed to one-piece dresses.

Her line was made for juniors and petite women, as she herself was petite. At this time, such clothing lines were very few, so smaller women often had to dress in child-like clothes. Junior Sophisticates began with styles of buttons and bows, as well as frills to appeal to their mainly junior demographic, but slowly transitioned into more sleek and mature designs. The more mature designs from the Junior Sophisticates line were a preview to what the designs in her future business, Anne Klein and Company, would closely resemble.

Part of the inspiration behind Anne Klein’s brand was putting a feminine twist on what was stereotypically menswear, such as jackets and suits. Coco Chanel was the first company to do so, making Anne Klein the second.

About this time, she began to win various awards in the fashion industry, including:

1954- the Mademoiselle Merit Award.

1954- the Coty American Fashion Critics Award.

1959- the Neiman-Marcus Fashion Award

These led to her international recognition as a fashion designer.

== Fashion career 1960s and 1970s ==
In 1960, her marriage to Ben Klein ended, as did her association with Junior Sophisticates.

During the early 1960s, after her divorce from Ben Klein, she kept the name Klein and worked as a freelance designer, reinvigorating well-known but faltering lines such as Pierre Cardin and Evan-Picone.

This freelance work helped to fund her 1963 opening of Anne Klein Studio on 57th Street. Also in 1963 she married a second time to Matthew "Chip" Rubenstein. Matthew Rubenstein was in the paper bag business when he met Klein.

In 1965, she, her husband, and three designers, Don Simonelli, Gerald Feder, and Hazel Haire, came together to make the Anne Klein Design Studio.

In 1961, she was one of a select group to win the American Creativity Award.

In 1964, she was awarded the Lord & Taylor Rose Award for independent thinking, an award first given to Albert Einstein.

In 1968, she established the Anne Klein & Company label as director and co-owner with her husband, on 39th Street. The label was opened in collaboration with investor Gunther Oppenheim, a fashion industry stalwart. Over the next ten years, the business expanded to having 750 department stores and boutiques in America selling her designs.

In 1969, she was awarded the Neiman-Marcus Fashion Award; she was, later, the first designer to win the award for a second time.

In 1970, Klein opened the first designer shop-in-shop boutique, "Anne Klein Corner" in Saks Fifth Avenue, New York. That year, she was awarded the Coty American Fashion Critics Award, which she would win again. A year later, in 1971, she was named to the Coty Fashion Hall of Fame. The 8th designer to be so inducted in 28 years.

In 1973, she was included as one of five designers invited to show at the Battle of Versailles design competition to raise money for renovations at Versailles. Also in 1973, she asked Tomio Taki to become a partner of her company, giving him a 25% percent share of it. Unfortunately, she passed only a year after making this deal with Taki.

== Death ==
Anne Klein was diagnosed with terminal breast cancer in the late 1960’s. On March 19, 1974, Anne Klein died at the age of 50 of breast cancer at Mount Sinai Hospital in New York, NY . She was survived by her husband Matthew “Chip” Rubenstein, as well as her two sisters, Mae Waldman and Rita Kiniat.

== The company ==
After Anne Klein died in 1974, the company dealt with periods of financial troubles. Donna Karan and Louis Dell’Olio took over the design direction of the company. The main consensus after these uncertain times was that the company needed to focus on going back to Anne Klein’s original values and design choices, as that is where the brand experienced the most success.

Anne Klein is an American privately held company owned by WHP Global who acquired the brand in July 2019. They purchased the company from Premier Brands Group. The group claimed to have sold the company to focus more on other companies they own. Some goals that WHP Global have expressed for the company included growing the company through U.S. retailers including Macy’s and expanding globally. They also wanted to focus on investing in marketing, social media, and digital commerce in hopes of gaining more brand engagement.

The brand markets a complete lifestyle assortment, ranging from apparel to footwear, watches, and jewelry. Anne Klein & Company is based in 60 countries worldwide.

== Awards ==
- 1954 – Mademoiselle Merit Award
- 1955, 1969, 1971 – Coty American Fashion Critics Award
- 1959, 1969 – Neiman Marcus Award (Klein was the first designer to receive this award twice)
- 1964 – Lord & Taylor Award
- 1965 – National Cotton Council Award
- 1971 – Induction into the Coty Fashion Hall of Fame
