= South Florida Times =

Weekly newspaper based in Southern Florida

- Type: Weekly newspaper
- Owner(s): Beatty Media LLC
- Founder(s): Robert G. Beatty
- Publisher: Robert G. Beatty
- Editor: CB Hanif
- Founded: 1990 (as the Broward Times)
- Language: English
- Website: sfltimes.com

The South Florida Times is a weekly newspaper covering the Black community in Miami-Dade, Broward, and Palm Beach counties in south Florida. It publishes on Thursdays, with a circulation of about 35,000.

== History ==
Keith Clayborne founded the Broward Times in 1990. It was seen as the voice of younger, educated, "up-and-coming" voices in the local Black community, largely from the Caribbean, as opposed to the older veterans of the civil rights era. In 2000 the paper formed an editorial partnership with the Sun-Sentinel. Clayborne hired a new editor, Utrice Leid, in 2004, to take the paper "to the next level." At the time, the paper had a circulation of 24,000; hiring Leid reflected an effort to overcome a reputation for overusing unnamed sources. Clayborne, who did not have a background in journalism, had stepped away from his editing duties to run for political office. He was later sued for libel by his opponent, Alcee Hastings.

In 2007, Robert G. Beatty acquired Broward Times; the name was changed several months later to the South Florida Times, along with plans to expand to neighboring counties. Beatty had a background as legal counsel to the Miami Herald, and has been a featured speaker at local business functions. Bradley Bennett, who served as executive editor, also had a background with the Herald. The paper's stated mission includes in-depth analysis of worldwide events relating to the African diaspora, and making connections to its local community. The paper has partnered with the Miami Herald. The Times' reporting has been picked up by the Herald, and has been referenced in the Herald's own reporting. As of 2010, a journalism professor at the Florida International University partnered with the Times, assigning his students to investigate and report stories for the paper.

== Other publications ==
A publication called the South Florida Times, a monthly 4-color glossy magazine, was founded by Audrey S. Diamond, who was given a lifetime achievement award in 2003. (Unclear whether there is any relation between these publications.) There was also a Democratic publication of the same name in the late 19th century. There was also an earlier paper called the Broward Times in the 1980s.
