= Robert Sidney Bowen =

American author (1900–1977)

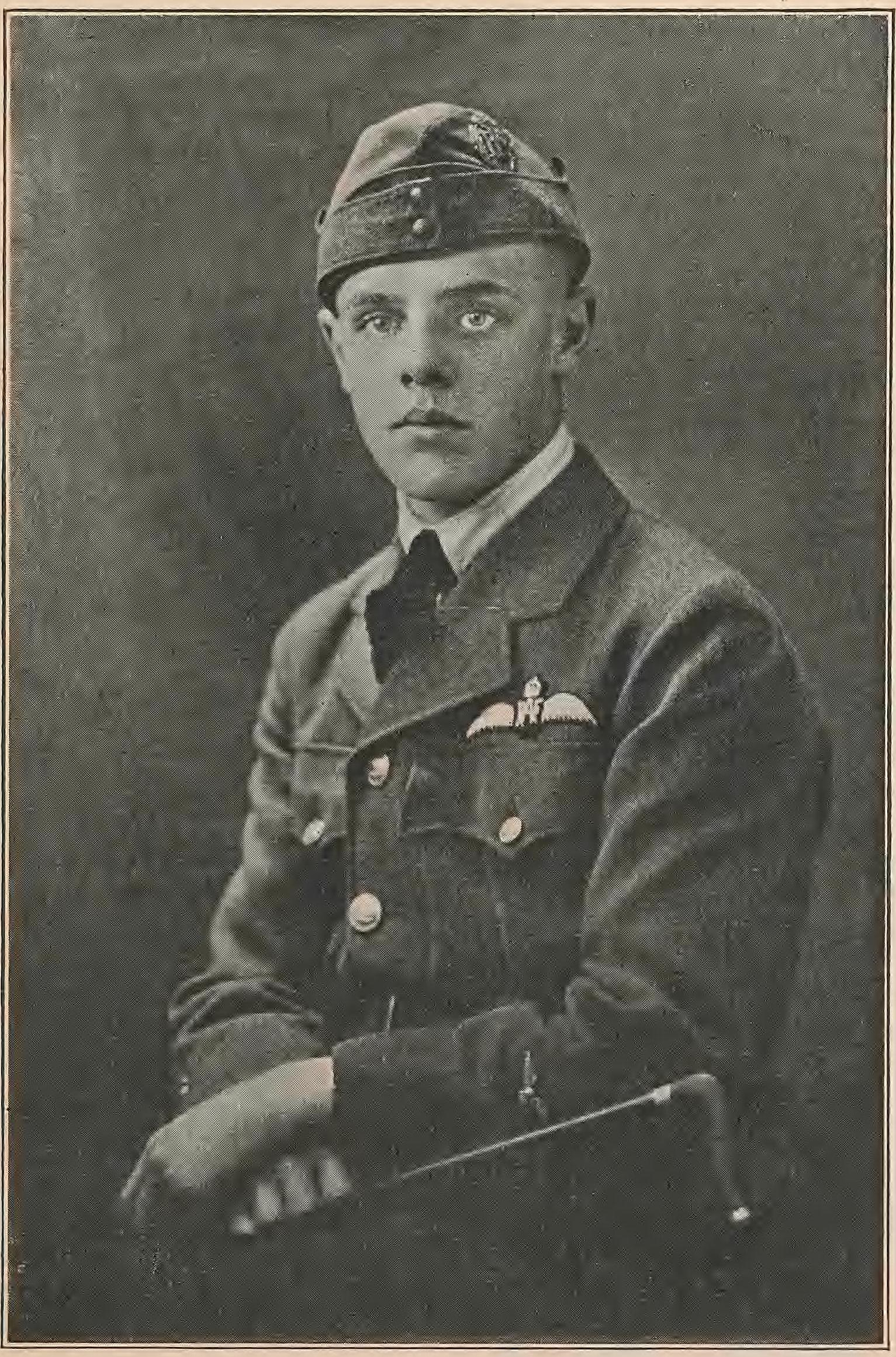
- Robert Sidney Bowen, R.A.F.
- Born: October 4, 1900; Boston, Massachusetts, U.S.
- Died: April 11, 1977 (aged 76)
- Military career
- Allegiance: United States of America
- Branch: Royal Air Force
- Rank: Second Lieutenant
- Other work: Journalist and writer

Robert Sidney Bowen, Jr. (October 4, 1900 – April 11, 1977) was an American World War I aviator, newspaper journalist, magazine editor and author who was born in Boston, Massachusetts, and died of cancer in Honolulu, Hawaii, at the age of 76. He is best known for his boys' series books written during World War II, the Dave Dawson War Adventure Series and the Red Randall Series. He also worked under the name R. Sidney Bowen and under the pseudonym James Robert Richard.

== Life ==
=== Before becoming an author ===
Robert Sidney Bowen was born in Allston, Massachusetts to Robert Sidney and Catharine Sinclair (Fenton) Bowen. His grandfather, Charles F. Bowen, fought in the Fifth Massachusetts Volunteer Infantry during the American Civil War. Bowen attended Newton High School in Newton, Massachusetts. After World War I broke out in Europe, Bowen left school to drive an ambulance for the American Field Service (AFS) in France. In May 1917, the United States Army Ambulance Service took over the AFS, and Bowen, being underage to serve, returned to the United States. When he turned seventeen, he signed up in October 1917 with Great Britain's Royal Flying Corps in the recruiting office in New York City as a Flight Cadet. He went through several phases of training, including basic military training, ground instruction, and flight instruction at Training Depot Stations (TDS), in different locations, first, at Toronto University, then at Camp Mohawk, Deseronto, Canada, at Camp Leaside, Beamsville, Canada, and at Camp Taliaferro, Fort Worth, Texas. According to The London Gazette, Bowen was granted a temporary commission as a Second Lieutenant in the Royal Air Force on June 20, 1918.

In July 1918, he went overseas to England, and was assigned to the 84th Squadron, R.A.F. fighting in France on SE5 fighter aircraft. He saw limited air combat over France but achieved no victories documented by the authorities, despite claims of shooting down two enemy airplanes on the eve of the Armistice. He wrote to his family, "I reported my flight, but it was hard lines for me because I have no idea where the German planes went down and therefore they can't be credited as official... My bus has 33 bullet holes in it and three in my flying suit, which shows I was in some close action." After the end of hostilities at the Western Front, Bowen transferred to the United States Army Air Service.

After the war, Bowen began working as a journalist for the London Daily Mail, the Paris edition of the Chicago Tribune, and two Boston newspapers. For several years (until the 1930s), he was editor-in-chief of Aviation Magazine. He also worked as an editor for Flying News and several motor magazines.

=== As an author ===
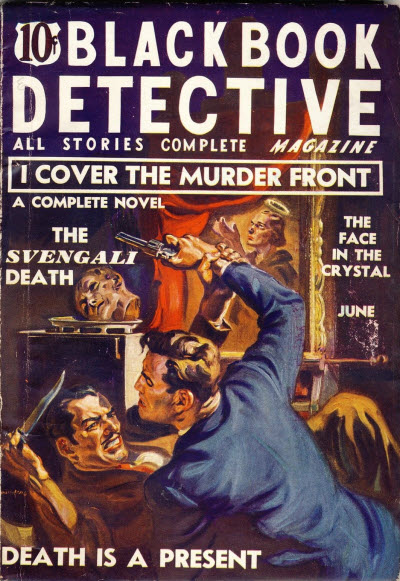
Bowen's "I Cover the Murder Front" was the lead story in the June 1937 issue of Black Book Detective.

Bowen turned to writing in 1930, using his prestige as editor-in-chief of Aviation Magazine to write Flying From The Ground Up, a non-fiction work on how to fly an airplane. He began freelancing for pulp magazines. In 1934, he headlined his own pulp magazine, Dusty Ayres and His Battle Birds, for Popular Publications. Twelve issues were released, the first ten published monthly from July 1934 through April 1935. Bowen continued writing for mystery, adventure, sports, and aviation pulp magazines through the 1950s.

After the invasion of Poland by Germany in 1939 sparked World War II, Crown Publishers called Bowen, asking for an adventure story based on the war. The Dave Dawson series, also known as the War Adventure series, was the result. Bowen got to work immediately, and the first book, Dave Dawson At Dunkirk, was published in 1941. A total of 15 volumes were released between 1941 and 1946.

By 1945 the series had sold over 2,000,000 copies. Bowen was earning 2 1/2 cents per copy sold, netting him nearly $10,000 a year (Approximately $177,000 in 2024). All volumes, except for the scarce final volume, were subsequently reprinted (with cheaper quality and prices) by Saalfield Publishers in Akron, Ohio.

Inspired by the success of the Dave Dawson books, Crown's competing publisher Grosset & Dunlap hired Bowen to write a similar series for them. The Red Randall series debuted in 1944, selling 200,000 copies its first year.

During this time, Bowen lived in Wilton, Connecticut, writing seven days a week, from 9 to 5, in an office that he rented over an old garage. He averaged 10,000 words per day, and could complete a novel in ten days. He also never revised his work, believing that any tampering with the story would ruin it.

After the war, Bowen turned to writing books aimed toward adolescent boys, on topics such as aviation, cars, and baseball. He also began writing books about horses under the pseudonym James Robert Richard. Most of the books he wrote during this period were published by Lothrop, Lee & Shepard. Many of his baseball books were later reprinted by Grosset & Dunlap in their series of "Famous Sports Stories." Most of his other books were published by Chilton, Whitman Publishing, Criterion.

Robert Sidney Bowen and his second wife, MaryAnn (MacIntyre) Bowen, had two sons, James Sinclair Bowen and Richard Fenton Bowen, and one daughter, Virginia Bowen, and, at the time of his death, five grandchildren, Katherine Ann Bowen, Thomas Robert Bowen, Cheryl L. Bowen, Wayne Tucker, and Linda. Robert Sidney Bowen was first married to Marjorie Percy Bowen and had a son Robert Watson Bowen who has three children Greg, Jennifer and Beth.

== Partial bibliography ==
=== Series Books ===
==== Dusty Ayres And His Battle Birds ====
Date	Title	Series
July 1934	Black Lightning	Dusty Ayres And His Battle Birds
August 1934	Crimson Doom	Dusty Ayres And His Battle Birds
September 1934	Purple Tornado	Dusty Ayres And His Battle Birds
October 1934	The Screaming Eye	Dusty Ayres And His Battle Birds
November 1934	The Green Thunderbolt	Dusty Ayres And His Battle Birds
December 1934	The Red Destroyer	Dusty Ayres And His Battle Birds
January 1935	The White Death	Dusty Ayres And His Battle Birds
February 1935	The Black Avenger	Dusty Ayres And His Battle Birds
March 1935	The Silver Typhoon	Dusty Ayres And His Battle Birds
April 1935	The Troposphere F-S	Dusty Ayres And His Battle Birds
May–June 1935	The Blue Cyclone	Dusty Ayres And His Battle Birds
July–August 1935	The Telsa Raiders	Dusty Ayres And His Battle Birds

==== Dave Dawson War Adventure Series ====
Year	Title	Series
1941	Dave Dawson at Dunkirk	Dave Dawson War Adventure Series
1941	Dave Dawson with the R.A.F.	Dave Dawson War Adventure Series
1941	Dave Dawson in Libya	Dave Dawson War Adventure Series
1941	Dave Dawson on Convoy Patrol	Dave Dawson War Adventure Series
1941	Dave Dawson Flight Lieutenant	Dave Dawson War Adventure Series
1942	Dave Dawson At Singapore	Dave Dawson War Adventure Series
1942	Dave Dawson With The Pacific Fleet	Dave Dawson War Adventure Series
1942	Dave Dawson With The Air Corps	Dave Dawson War Adventure Series
1942	Dave Dawson With The Commandos	Dave Dawson War Adventure Series
1943	Dave Dawson On The Russian Front	Dave Dawson War Adventure Series
1943	Dave Dawson With The Flying Tigers	Dave Dawson War Adventure Series
1943	Dave Dawson On Guadalcanal	Dave Dawson War Adventure Series
1944	Dave Dawson At Casablanca	Dave Dawson War Adventure Series
1944	Dave Dawson With The Eighth Air Force	Dave Dawson War Adventure Series
1946	Dave Dawson At Truk	Dave Dawson War Adventure Series

==== Red Randall Series ====
Year	Title	Series
1944	Red Randall At Pearl Harbor	Red Randall Series
1944	Red Randall On Active Duty	Red Randall Series
1944	Red Randall Over Tokyo	Red Randall Series
1944	Red Randall At Midway	Red Randall Series
1944	Red Randall On New Guinea	Red Randall Series
1945	Red Randall In The Aleutians	Red Randall Series
1945	Red Randall In Burma	Red Randall Series
1946	Red Randall's One-Man War	Red Randall Series

=== Non-Series Books ===
==== Using Real Name ====
Year	Title	Publisher
1931	Flying From The Ground Up	McGraw
1948	The Winning Pitch	Lothrop, Lee & Shepard
1949	Player, Manager	Lothrop, Lee & Shepard
1949	Fourth Down	Lothrop, Lee & Shepard
1950	Ball Hawk'	Lothrop, Lee & Shepard
1950	Blocking Back	Lothrop, Lee & Shepard
1951	Hot Corner	Lothrop, Lee & Shepard
1951	Touchdown Kid	Lothrop, Lee & Shepard
1952	Canyon Fury	Lothrop, Lee & Shepard
1952	Pitcher Of The Year	Lothrop, Lee & Shepard
1953	Behind The Bat	Lothrop, Lee & Shepard
1954	Infield Spark	Lothrop, Lee & Shepard
1954	The Million-Dollar Fumble	Lothrop, Lee & Shepard
1955	The Big Inning	Lothrop, Lee & Shepard
1955	The Last White Line	Lothrop, Lee & Shepard
1956	The 4th Out	Lothrop, Lee & Shepard
1957	No Hitter	Lothrop, Lee & Shepard
1958	The Big Hit	Lothrop, Lee & Shepard
1959	Triple Play	Lothrop, Lee & Shepard
1960	Hot Rod Angels	Chilton
1960	Pennant Fever	Lothrop, Lee & Shepard
1961	Million-Dollar Rookie	Lothrop, Lee & Shepard
1961	The Airport, Our Link To The Sky	Whitman
1962	Bat Boy	Lothrop, Lee & Shepard
1962	Flight Into Danger	Chilton
1962	Wings For An Eagle	Chilton
1963	Hot Rod Fury	Monarch Books (Juvenile)
1963	Perfect Game	Lothrop, Lee & Shepard
1963	Dirt Track Danger	Doubleday
1963	They Found The Unknown: The Stories Of Nine Great Discoveries In The Field Of Medical Knowledge	Macrae
1964	Hot Corner Blues	Lothrop, Lee & Shepard
1964	Hot Rod Rodeo	Criterion
1965	Rebel Rookie	Lothrop, Lee & Shepard
1965	They Flew To Glory: The Story Of The Lafayette Flying Corps	Lothrop, Lee & Shepard
1966	Hot Rod Patrol	Criterion
1966	Man On First	Lothrop, Lee & Shepard
1967	Hot Rod Showdown	Criterion
1967	Lightning Southpaw	Lothrop, Lee & Shepard
1968	Hot Rod Outlaws	Chilton
1969	Wipeout	Criterion
1969	Hawaii Five-O: Top Secret	Whitman
1969	Infield Flash	Lothrop, Lee & Shepard
1970	Basket Fever	Western Publishing
1971	Born To Fly	Criterion
1973	Hot Rod Doom	Criterion

==== Using pseudonym James Robert Richard ====
Year	Title	Publisher
1950	The Club Team	Lothrop, Lee & Shepard
1952	Fighting Halfback	Lothrop, Lee & Shepard
1953	Quarterback, All-American	Lothrop, Lee & Shepard
1954	Phantom Mustang	Lothrop, Lee & Shepard
1955	The Purple Palomino	Lothrop, Lee & Shepard
1956	The Appaloosa Curse	Lothrop, Lee & Shepard
1957	Snow King, Lipizzan Horse	Lothrop, Lee & Shepard
1958	Double M For Morgans	Lothrop, Lee & Shepard
1959	Joker, The Polo Pony	Lothrop, Lee & Shepard

== In Periodicals ==
- Enough’s Too Much, (short story) War Stories June 1927
- For Men Only, (short story) Munsey’s Magazine July 1927
- A Gashly Experience, (short story) War Stories #11, August 19, 1927
- High Odds, (short story) War Stories #13, September 15, 1927
- “Gimme That Dough!”, (short story) War Stories #16, October 27, 1927
- From Midnight Clouds, (short story) War Stories #20, December 22, 1927
- Sherman Was All Wrong, (short story) War Novels #1, February 1928
- Gurgling Wings, (short story) War Birds #1, March 1928
- Too Much Gas, (short story) War Birds #3, May 1928
- That Paris Glide, (short story) War Birds #6, August 1928
- Here’s How, (short story) Over the Top October 1928
- A Hero by Request, (short story) Over the Top November 1928
- The Dawn of Death, (novelette) World War Stories April 1929
- Cockpit Flying Course, (article) Flying Aces January 1930, etc.
- Death Flies the Mail, (novelette) Sky Birds April 1930
- Five to One, (short story) Sky Riders #20, June 1930
- “Dive, Major, Dive!”, (short story) Sky Riders #22, August 1930
- The Roving Squadron, (short story) Flying Aces August 1930
- The Flying Frankfurt, (short story) War Birds #33, September 1930
- Crazy’s Camouflaged Camel, (short story) Battle Aces November 1930
- Wrong Hunch, (short story) Sky Riders #25, November 1930
- Wing to Wing, (short story) Airplane Stories December 1930
- “Shorty” Takes a Dive, (short story) Battle Aces January 1931
- Diving for the Devil, (short story) Airplane Stories March 1931
- Rat Poison, (short story) Gang World March 1931
- The Sky Scorcher, (short story) Sky Birds April 1931
- Dead Men’s Shoes to Fill, (short story) Gang World May 1931
- The Death Spin, (short story) Battle Aces May 1931
- The Chiseler Trap, (short story) Gang World June 1931
- Gallant Enemy, (novelette) War Birds #43, June 1931
- The Midnight Patrol, (short story) Battle Aces June 1931
- The Bomb Yanker, (short story) Battle Aces July 1931
- Last Flight, (novelette) Battle Aces August 1931
- No Guns, (short story) War Birds #45, August 1931
- Throw It in the River, (short story) War Aces #17, August 1931
- Death Goes Solo, (short story) Battle Aces September 1931
- Pants for Pilots, (short story) War Birds #47, October 1931
- Crazy as Hell, (short story) War Birds #48, November 1931
- The Pilot from Hell, (short story) Battle Aces November 1931
- Death Takes the Stick, (short story) War Aces #21, December 1931
- The Vanished Patrol, (short story) Battle Aces December 1931
- Hell’s Ace, (short story) Battle Aces January 1932
- The Shadow of Death, (short story) Gang World January 1932
- The Graveyard of Hell, (short story) Battle Aces February 1932
- Murder by Proxy, (short story) Gang World February 1932
- The Cobra Killer, (short story) Gang World March 1932
- Satan’s Blockade, (short story) Dare-Devil Aces March 1932
- The Suicide Squadron, (short story) Battle Aces March 1932
- The Break, (short story) War Birds #53, April 1932
- Bullet Proof, (short story) Gang World April 1932
- The Devil’s Aces, (short story) Battle Aces April 1932
- The Vanishing Squadrons, (short story) Dare-Devil Aces April 1932
- Dicks Are Dumb, (short story) Gang World May 1932
- The Enemy Is Crazy, (short story) War Aces #26, May 1932
- Pilots Must Eat, (short story) War Birds #54, May 1932
- Alibi Buster, (short story) Gang World June 1932
- Bullets Don’t Win, (short story) War Birds #55, June 1932
- The Devil’s Pilot, (short story) Dare-Devil Aces June 1932
- Flight of the Skulls, (short story) Battle Aces June 1932
- Butterfly Blood, (short story) Sky Fighters July 1932
- The Dead Die Twice, (short story) Gang World July 1932
- The Flaming Eagle, (short story) Dare-Devil Aces July 1932
- The Flying Corpse, (short story) Battle Aces July 1932
- Nails for Sky Coffins, (short story) Sky Fighters August 1932
- Patrol of the Vulture, (short story) Dare-Devil Aces August 1932
- Prop to Prop, (short story) Sky Birds August 1932
- Phantom Triggers, (short story) Gang World September 1932
- The Scarlet Fokker, (short story) Dare-Devil Aces September 1932
- The Death Drome, (short story) Battle Aces October 1932
- How the War Crates Flew, (column) Sky Fighters October 1932, etc.
- They All Squeal, (short story) Gang World October 1932
- The Bronco Patrol, (short story) Battle Aces November 1932
- The Flying Panther, (short story) Dare-Devil Aces November 1932
- Trigger Treason, (short story) Gang World November 1932
- The Flying Mongrels, (short story) Battle Birds December 1932
- Hell’s C.O., (short story) Battle Aces December 1932
- Suicide Drome, (short story) Dare-Devil Aces December 1932
- Cloud Worms, (short story) Battle Birds January 1933
- The One-Ace Squadron, (short story) Dare-Devil Aces January 1933
- The Grenadine Ace, (short story) War Birds #59, February 1933
- The Looping Lunatic, (short story) Dare-Devil Aces February 1933
- Suicide Squadron, (short story) Battle Birds February 1933
- The Conquering Camel, (short story) Sky Fighters March 1933
- The Flaming Comet, (short story) Dare-Devil Aces March 1933
- Flying Justice, (short story) The Blue Book Magazine March 1933
- Pilot’s Luck, (short story) War Birds #60, March 1933
- The Red Ace, (short story) Battle Birds March 1933
- Dizzy Doings, (article) Sky Fighters April 1933
- Squadron of the Damned, (short story) Dare-Devil Aces April 1933
- Too Dumb to Die, (short story) Sky Fighters April 1933
- Killer’s Patrol, (short story) Battle Birds May 1933
- The Pirate Squadron, (short story) Dare-Devil Aces May 1933
- Flight of the Vigilantes, (short story) Dare-Devil Aces June 1933
- Formation Flying, (article) Sky Fighters June 1933
- The Million Dollar Ace, (short story) Battle Birds June 1933
- Iron-Fisted, (short story) Dare-Devil Aces July 1933
- The Thirteenth C.O., (short story) Battle Birds July 1933
- Combat Flying, (column) George Bruce’s Contact August 1933, etc.
- Dynamite Peelot, (short story) Dare-Devil Aces August 1933
- Flight of the Derelicts, (short story) Battle Birds August 1933
- The Neutral Nemesis, (novelette) Flying Aces August 1933
- Without Gloves, (short story) War Birds #65, August 1933
- The Colonel Couldn’t Take It, (short story) George Bruce’s Squadron September 1933
- The Shanghaied Squadron, (short story) Battle Birds September 1933
- Snipe Bait, (short story) Dare-Devil Aces September 1933
- After the Ball, (short story) All Detective Magazine October 1933
- Cutthroat Buzzards, (short story) Battle Birds October 1933
- The Floating Runt, (short story) G-8 and His Battle Aces October 1933
- Strangers’ Squadron, (short story) Dare-Devil Aces October 1933
- Claws of the Condor, (short story) War Birds #68, November 1933
- Patrol of the Silent Death, (short story) Dare-Devil Aces November 1933
- The Phantom Bomber, (short story) Battle Birds November 1933
- The Come-Back Ace, (short story) Dare-Devil Aces December 1933
- The Mercedes Maniacs, (novelette) Battle Birds December 1933
- The Prop Buster, (short story) War Birds #69, December 1933
- The All-American Ace, (short story) Dare-Devil Aces January 1934
- The Convict Patrol, (novelette) Battle Birds January 1934
- Night Flying, (article) Sky Fighters January 1934
- Silent Vickers, (short story) Sky Fighters January 1934
- Flight of the Ape-Men, (novelette) Battle Birds February 1934
- Guns and Howitzers, (article) Sky Fighters February 1934
- The Fokker Firebrand, (short story) Dare-Devil Aces March 1934
- Scavenger Squadron, (short story) Battle Birds March 1934
- Drum Fire, (short story) All Detective Magazine April 1934
- Murder Mercedes, (short story) Battle Birds April 1934
- The Zooming Zebra, (short story) Dare-Devil Aces April 1934
- Death Goes Backstage, (short story) All Detective Magazine May 1934
- The Hanging Squadron, (short story) Battle Birds May 1934
- The Sing-Sing Ace, (novella) Dare-Devil Aces May 1934
- The Haunted Hangar, (short story) Battle Birds June 1934
- Black Lightning! [Dusty Ayres; Fire-Eyes], (novella) Dusty Ayres and His Battle Birds July 1934
- The C.O.’s Coffin [Dusty Ayres], (short story) Dusty Ayres and His Battle Birds July 1934
- The Smoke-Screen Ace [Dusty Ayres], (short story) Dusty Ayres and His Battle Birds July 1934
- Crimson Doom [Dusty Ayres; Fire-Eyes], (novella) Dusty Ayres and His Battle Birds August 1934
- The Death Bomber [Dusty Ayres], (short story) Dusty Ayres and His Battle Birds August 1934
- The Floating Phantom [Dusty Ayres], (short story) Dusty Ayres and His Battle Birds August 1934
- The Silver Caterpillar [Dusty Ayres], (short story) Dusty Ayres and His Battle Birds August 1934
- Dynamite Decoy [Dusty Ayres], (novelette) Dusty Ayres and His Battle Birds September 1934
- The Invisible Raider [Dusty Ayres], (short story) Dusty Ayres and His Battle Birds September 1934
- Jobless Works Overtime, (short story) All Detective Magazine September 1934
- The Purple Tornado [Dusty Ayres; Fire-Eyes], (novella) Dusty Ayres and His Battle Birds September 1934
- The Rough Water Ace [Dusty Ayres], (short story) Dusty Ayres and His Battle Birds October 1934
- The Screaming Eye [Dusty Ayres; Fire-Eyes], (novella) Dusty Ayres and His Battle Birds October 1934
- Vanishing Vultures [Dusty Ayres], (novelette) Dusty Ayres and His Battle Birds October 1934
- The Cockpit Killer [Dusty Ayres], (short story) Dusty Ayres and His Battle Birds November 1934
- The Green Thunderbolt [Dusty Ayres; Fire-Eyes], (novel) Dusty Ayres and His Battle Birds November 1934
- The Ten Dollar Ace [Dusty Ayres], (short story) Dusty Ayres and His Battle Birds November 1934
- Drifting Death [Dusty Ayres], (short story) Dusty Ayres and His Battle Birds December 1934
- The Phantom Army [Dusty Ayres], (short story) Dusty Ayres and His Battle Birds December 1934
- The Red Destroyer [Dusty Ayres; Fire-Eyes], (novel) Dusty Ayres and His Battle Birds December 1934
- Wings for a Fledgling, (short story) War Birds #81, December 1934
- Flying Rawhide [Dusty Ayres], (short story) Dusty Ayres and His Battle Birds January 1935
- Nobody’s Ace [Dusty Ayres], (short story) Dusty Ayres and His Battle Birds January 1935
- The Purple Patrol, (short story) Dare-Devil Aces January 1935
- The White Death [Dusty Ayres; Fire-Eyes], (novel) Dusty Ayres and His Battle Birds January 1935
- The Black Avenger [Dusty Ayres; Fire-Eyes], (novel) Dusty Ayres and His Battle Birds February 1935
- Hell’s Admiral [Dusty Ayres], (short story) Dusty Ayres and His Battle Birds February 1935
- The Thirteenth Ace, (short story) Dare-Devil Aces February 1935
- The Vertical Vulture [Dusty Ayres], (short story) Dusty Ayres and His Battle Birds February 1935
- Black Magic [Dusty Ayres], (short story) Dusty Ayres and His Battle Birds March 1935
- Pinch-Hitting Ace [Dusty Ayres], (short story) Dusty Ayres and His Battle Birds March 1935
- The Silver Typhoon [Dusty Ayres; Fire-Eyes], (novel) Dusty Ayres and His Battle Birds March 1935
- Ace in the Hole [Dusty Ayres], (short story) Dusty Ayres and His Battle Birds April 1935
- Blind Buzzards [Dusty Ayres], (short story) Dusty Ayres and His Battle Birds April 1935
- The Radio Raider [Dusty Ayres], (short story) Dusty Ayres and His Battle Birds April 1935
- T.N.T. Staffel, (short story) Dare-Devil Aces April 1935
- The Troposphere F-S [Dusty Ayres; Fire-Eyes], (novel) Dusty Ayres and His Battle Birds April 1935
- The Blue Cyclone [Dusty Ayres; Fire-Eyes], (novel) Dusty Ayres and His Battle Birds May/June 1935
- The Looping Blimp [Dusty Ayres], (short story) Dusty Ayres and His Battle Birds May/June 1935
- The Phantom Pilot [Dusty Ayres], (short story) Dusty Ayres and His Battle Birds May/June 1935
- The Slow-Motion Ace [Dusty Ayres], (short story) Dusty Ayres and His Battle Birds May/June 1935
- The Whirlwind Peelot, (short story) Dare-Devil Aces May 1935
- The Outlaw Squadron, (short story) Dare-Devil Aces June 1935
- Key to Murder, (short story) Dime Detective Magazine June 15, 1935
- One Minute to Live, (short story) This Week June 23, 1935
- Gambling Buzzards [Dusty Ayres], (novelette) Dusty Ayres and His Battle Birds July/August 1935
- The Red Thunderbolt, (short story) Dare-Devil Aces July 1935
- The Telsa Raiders [Dusty Ayres; Fire-Eyes], (novel) Dusty Ayres and His Battle Birds July/August 1935
- The Tin-Fish Ace [Dusty Ayres], (short story) Dusty Ayres and His Battle Birds July/August 1935
- The Boomerang Ace, (short story) Dare-Devil Aces August 1935
- Lose or Else, (short story) Dime Sport Magazine August 1935
- The Crimson Typhoon, (novelette) Dare-Devil Aces September 1935
- Fugitive’s Finish, (short story) Dime Sport Magazine September 1935
- Killer’s Swan Song, (short story) Detective Tales September 1935
- The Living Flame, (novelette) Horror Stories September 1935
- The Soft Eagle, (short story) Sky Fighters October 1935
- The X-Ray Patrol, (short story) Dare-Devil Aces October 1935
- Anchor Man, (short story) Dime Sports Magazine November 1935
- The Buddha Laughs, (short story) The Mysterious Wu Fang November 1935
- Doomed Men, (short story) The Lone Eagle November 1935
- The One-Way Ace, (short story) Dare-Devil Aces November 1935
- Hurdle High Jinks, (short story) Dime Sports Magazine December 1935
- The Typhoon Ace [Happy Harper], (novelette) Dare-Devil Aces December 1935
- Alias the Winner, (short story) Dime Sports Magazine January 1936
- The Gum-Shoe Patrol, (short story) Dare-Devil Aces January 1936
- The Flying Coffin [Kip Lacey], (short story) Dime Detective Magazine February 1936
- Satan’s Ace, (novelette) Dare-Devil Aces February 1936
- Orders for Eagles, (short story) Dare-Devil Aces March 1936
- Sky Vultures, (novelette) Sky Fighters March 1936
- Diving Dynamite, (short story) Thrilling Adventures April 1936
- The Flying Diamond [Kip Lacey], (short story) Dime Detective Magazine April 1936
- The Purple Camel, (short story) Sky Fighters April 1936
- The Sure Thing Ace, (short story) Dare-Devil Aces April 1936
- Medals for Nothing, (short story) Dare-Devil Aces May 1936
- Picture Pilots, (vi) The Lone Eagle May 1936
- Proof Indigo, (short story) G-Men May 1936
- Elementary, My Dear Watson!, (vi) Liberty May 2, 1936
- Corpse in Seat 2 [Kip Lacey], (short story) Dime Detective Magazine June 1936
- Hollywood Czar [Dan Fowler], (novella) G-Men June 1936, as by C. K. M. Scanlon
- Hurdle Hoodoo, (short story) Dime Sports Magazine June 1936
- The Miracle Ace, (vi) The Lone Eagle June 1936
- The Riot Act Ace, (short story) Dare-Devil Aces June 1936
- Sing Sing Serenade, (short story) Popular Detective June 1936
- The Thirteenth Fledgling, (short story) Sky Fighters June 1936
- Aces Can Take It, (short story) Dare-Devil Aces July 1936
- Death Banks Left, (short story) Sky Fighters July 1936
- The Other Bullet [Kip Lacey], (short story) Dime Detective Magazine July 1936
- Phony Kill, (short story) Popular Detective July 1936
- Poker Pilots, (vi) The Lone Eagle July 1936
- Trial Horse, (short story) Dime Sports Magazine July 1936
- Fledgling by Request, (short story) Dare-Devil Aces August 1936
- Bench Warmer, (novelette) Thrilling Sports September 1936
- The 4 O’Clock Ace, (short story) Dare-Devil Aces September 1936
- The Home-Made Ace, (short story) Sky Fighters September 1936
- Into Thin Air [Kip Lacey], (short story) Dime Detective Magazine September 1936
- Aces for Sale, (short story) Dare-Devil Aces October 1936
- Fledgling’s First, (vi) The Lone Eagle October 1936
- G Fear, (short story) The Phantom Detective October 1936
- G-Smoke, (short story) G-Men October 1936
- The Ace from Nowheres, (short story) Dare-Devil Aces November 1936
- Aces Even, (short story) Thrilling Adventures November 1936
- Commander Satan, (novella) Sky Fighters November 1936
- Wings Over Somewhere, (novelette) Ace-High Detective Magazine November 1936
- Fledgling, (short story) The Lone Eagle December 1936
- Payroll Player, (short story) Thrilling Sports December 1936
- The Ten Day Eagle, (short story) Dare-Devil Aces December 1936
- A Ticket to Terror [Kip Lacey], (short story) Dime Detective Magazine December 1936
- Aces Take the Air, (short story) Thrilling Adventures January 1937
- Black Vengeance, (short story) Dare-Devil Aces January 1937
- Aces Don’t Count, (short story) Dare-Devil Aces February 1937
- Fokker Finale, (short story) Sky Fighters February 1937
- Generals Shouldn’t Fly, (vi) The Lone Eagle February 1937
- The Man Who Was Two [Kip Lacey], (short story) Dime Detective Magazine February 1937
- The Dead Can’t Fly, (short story) Dare-Devil Aces March 1937
- Ship for Ship, (short story) Sky Fighters March 1937
- Death Takes the Air [Kip Lacey], (short story) Dime Detective Magazine April 1937
- Dive 10, (short story) G-Men April 1937
- No Guns Needed, (vi) The Lone Eagle April 1937
- Scrambled Aces, (short story) Dare-Devil Aces April 1937
- The Big Feller, (novelette) Thrilling Sports May 1937
- C.O.’s Not Wanted, (novelette) Dare-Devil Aces May 1937
- Death Flies East, (short story) The Phantom Detective May 1937
- Hellion’s Wings, (short story) Sky Fighters May 1937
- Bullets for Nothing, (short story) Dare-Devil Aces June 1937
- I Cover the Murder Front, (novella) Black Book Detective Magazine June 1937
- Bullets for Vultures, (short story) Dare-Devil Aces July 1937
- Fledgling’s Finish, (short story) Sky Fighters July 1937
- They Never Forget, (novelette) Thrilling Sports July 1937
- The Phantom Mercedes, (vi) The Lone Eagle August 1937
- The Soaring Screwball, (short story) Popular Sports Magazine August 1937
- The Color Blind Ace, (short story) Sky Fighters September 1937
- Death Below Decks, (short story) G-Men September 1937
- Doom to the Left, (short story) Thrilling Detective October 1937
- Cinder Cyclone, (short story) Dime Sports Magazine November 1937
- The Devil’s Squadron, (novelette) Sky Fighters November 1937
- Murder Takes Wing, (novelette) Popular Detective November 1937
- Nothing Like Experience, (short story) Thrilling Detective November 1937
- You Can’t Die Twice, (short story) Dare-Devil Aces December 1937
- Chiseler’s Patrol, (short story) Sky Fighters January 1938
- The Dead Fly On, (short story) Dare-Devil Aces January 1938
- Prize Title Contest Story, (short story) The Phantom Detective January 1938
- Champion’s Spikes, (short story) Dime Sports Magazine February 1938
- Comet Dust, (short story) Popular Sports Magazine February 1938
- Courage and Wings, (short story) Dare-Devil Aces February 1938
- Murder Ground-Loops, (short story) The Lone Eagle February 1938
- Bullets for the Brave, (short story) Sky Devils March 1938
- The Enemy Is Crazy [Jigger Jones], (short story) Dare-Devil Aces March 1938
- The One Up Ace, (short story) Sky Fighters March 1938
- The Ten-Dollar Hunch, (short story) Popular Detective March 1938
- Aces Be Damned, (short story) Dare-Devil Aces April 1938
- Comet Foam, (short story) Dime Sports Magazine April 1938
- Death Is a Door, (short story) Detective Tales April 1938
- Ghost Hitter, (short story) Popular Sports Magazine April 1938
- Lightning at Second, (novelette) Star Sports Magazine April 1938
- Three Man Patrol, (vi) The Lone Eagle April 1938
- Act of God, (short story) Detective Tales May 1938
- The Cloudy Kid, (short story) Dare-Devil Aces May 1938
- Five Seconds for Murder, (short story) Dime Detective Magazine May 1938
- Fokker Freedom, (short story) Sky Fighters May 1938
- Liquid Lightning, (short story) Thrilling Sports May 1938
- Murder Comes Calling, (short story) Captain Satan May 1938
- One More Win, (short story) Dime Sports Magazine May 1938
- Powder Pilots, (short story) Thrilling Adventures May 1938
- Hellbent for Glory, (short story) Dare-Devil Aces June 1938
- Hold Back the Clock!, (short story) Detective Tales June 1938
- Pylon Pirates, (short story) Popular Sports Magazine June 1938
- Aces Aren’t Born, (short story) Sky Devils July 1938
- The Black Armada, (novelette) Sky Fighters July 1938
- Captain Hornet, (short story) Dare-Devil Aces July 1938
- The Glory Glider, (short story) Thrilling Sports July 1938
- Murder Speaks Twice, (short story) Captain Satan July 1938
- All in the Game, (short story) Popular Sports Magazine August 1938
- Jinx Driver, (short story) Dime Sports Magazine August 1938
- Killer on Wings, (novelette) Dare-Devil Aces August 1938
- The Black Ace Returns (with William Hartley), (short story) Dare-Devil Aces September 1938
- Skirts on the Wing, (short story) Thrilling Sports September 1938
- T-Men Can’t Miss, (short story) The Phantom Detective September 1938
- The Wild Ace, (short story) Sky Fighters September 1938
- Black Lightning, (short story) Dime Sports Magazine October/November 1938
- Doom Down Stairs, (short story) Popular Detective October 1938
- Fokker Filibuster, (short story) The Lone Eagle October 1938
- Fokker Firebrand, (short story) Dare-Devil Aces October 1938
- Just One More Job, (short story) Detective Tales October 1938
- Murder Out of Thin Air [Kip Lacey], (short story) Dime Detective Magazine October 1938
- Tricky Wings, (vi) Sky Devils October 1938
- Breakfast Food for Kidnappers, (short story) Detective Tales November 1938
- Fast Company, (short story) Thrilling Sports November 1938
- Vultures Don’t Forget, (short story) Dare-Devil Aces November 1938
- Greaseballs and Guns, (short story) Dare-Devil Aces December 1938
- Puck Pawn, (short story) Ace Sports December 1938
- The Higher Justice, (short story) Detective Tales January 1939
- Slide, Fate, Slide, (short story) Thrilling Sports January 1939
- The Stairway to Hell, (novella) Dare-Devil Aces January 1939
- Winged Infernos for G.H.Q., (novelette) Sky Devils January 1939
- Burning Blades, (short story) Sports Novels Magazine February/March 1939
- Dead Man’s Patrol, (short story) Dare-Devil Aces February 1939
- Eight Dollar Murder, (short story) Detective Tales February 1939
- Crime Axis, (short story) Popular Detective April 1939
- Death Wears a High Hat, (short story) Dare-Devil Aces April 1939
- Haywire Ace, (short story) The Lone Eagle April 1939
- Smoke Cure for Rats, (short story) Detective Tales April 1939
- The Blimp Butcher, (short story) Dare-Devil Aces May 1939
- Wings from Hell [Happy Harper], (novella) Sky Fighters May 1939
- Infield Fury, (novelette) Super Sports June 1939
- Murder’s Wings Are Black, (short story) Dare-Devil Aces June 1939
- The Devil Flies Alone, (short story) Dare-Devil Aces July 1939
- The Devil’s Courier, (short story) Sky Fighters July 1939
- Flying Whiskers, (short story) Thrilling Sports July 1939
- Speed C.O.D., (short story) Blue Ribbon Sports July 1939
- Eagles May Die!, (short story) Dare-Devil Aces August 1939
- Flight to Glory, (short story) The Lone Eagle August 1939
- Son of the Mound, (short story) Dime Sports Magazine August/September 1939
- Square Wheels, (short story) Popular Sports Magazine August 1939
- Banners of the Brave, (short story) Dare-Devil Aces September 1939
- Sucker Pilot, (short story) Sky Fighters September 1939
- Whacky Waters, (short story) Thrilling Sports September 1939
- Record Wrecker, (short story) Dime Sports Magazine October 1939
- Satan Flies at Night, (short story) Dare-Devil Aces October 1939
- Aces Don’t Forget, (short story) Dare-Devil Aces November 1939
- Aces Don’t Cry, (short story) The Lone Eagle December 1939
- Blood of the Dead, (short story) G-Men January 1940
- Silk Wings, (short story) Thrilling Sports January 1940
- To Hell and Back, (short story) Dare-Devil Aces January 1940
- Wings of Fury, (novella) Sky Fighters January 1940
- Brains Over Ice, (short story) Popular Sports Magazine February 1940
- Last Flight of the Damned, (novella) Battle Birds February 1940
- Murder: Via Airmail, (short story) Air Adventures February 1940
- Sabotage Flight, (short story) The Lone Eagle February 1940
- All Aboard for Doom, (novella) Dare-Devil Aces March 1940
- Death Flies the Sky Route to Berlin, (novella) Fighting Aces March 1940
- Screwball Wings, (short story) Sky Fighters March 1940
- Suckers Fly High, (short story) Black Book Detective Magazine March 1940
- Fokker Fodder, (short story) The Lone Eagle April 1940
- Orders from Headquarters, (column) Captain Combat April 1940, etc., as by Barry Barton
- Petticoat Pilot, (short story) Popular Sports Magazine April 1940
- The Return of the Damned, (novella) Dare-Devil Aces April 1940
- The Sky Beast of Berlin [William Combat (Captain Combat)], (novella) Captain Combat April 1940, as by Barry Barton
- Dictators Be Damned, (novella) Dare-Devil Aces May 1940
- Memory Aces, (short story) Sky Fighters May 1940
- The Roving Renegade, (short story) Thrilling Sports May 1940
- Fledgling Fury, (short story) The Lone Eagle June 1940
- Passport to Doom, (short story) Dare-Devil Aces June 1940
- Red Wings for the Blood Battalion [William Combat (Captain Combat)], (novella) Captain Combat June 1940, as by Barry Barton
- Steel Doom, (short story) Sky Fighters July 1940
- Undersea Raiders, (short story) Thrilling Adventures July 1940
- Low Ceiling for Nazi Hell-Hawks [William Combat (Captain Combat)], (novella) Captain Combat August 1940, as by Barry Barton
- The Pointing Finger, (short story) Detective Novels Magazine August 1940
- Wings for a War-Dog [Red Mulligan], (short story) Dare-Devil Aces August 1940
- Death Has Its Points, (short story) G-Men Detective September 1940
- Eagles Can’t Quit, (short story) Sky Fighters September 1940
- Eagles Play for Keeps, (short story) Fighting Aces September 1940
- Record Wrecker, (short story) Dime Sports Magazine September 1940
- Soldier of the Damned, (short story) Dare-Devil Aces September 1940
- The Tri-Color Eagle, (short story) Air War Fall 1940
- Ball Shy, (short story) Dime Sports Magazine October 1940
- Diamond Destiny, (novelette) Popular Sports Magazine Fall 1940
- The Nazis Be Damned [Red Mulligan], (novelette) Dare-Devil Aces October 1940
- Here Lies a Nazi, (novella) Dare-Devil Aces November 1940
- Heroes Be Damned!, (novella) Dare-Devil Aces December 1940
- Aces Wild, (short story) Sky Fighters January 1941
- Suicide Patrol, (short story) Dare-Devil Aces January 1941
- Truthful Talbot, (short story) Thrilling Sports January 1941
- Eagles Die Twice, (short story) Dare-Devil Aces February 1941
- Poison to Rookies, (short story) Dime Sports Magazine February 1941
- That Kind of a Pilot, (short story) The Lone Eagle February 1941
- Eagles Fight Alone!, (novella) Dare-Devil Aces March 1941
- Pylon Picnic, (short story) Thrilling Sports March 1941
- Sacrifice at Second, (short story) Dime Sports Magazine March 1941
- Six Tickets to Hell, (short story) New Detective Magazine March 1941
- Vultures of the North Sea, (novelette) Sky Fighters March 1941
- Wings of War, (short story) Air War Spring 1941
- Terror Has Swift Wings, (novella) Dare-Devil Aces April 1941
- Come Down Shooting, (short story) Dare-Devil Aces May 1941
- Sky Writin’ Fool, (short story) Sky Fighters May 1941
- Crooks Shouldn’t Fly, (short story) The Lone Eagle June 1941
- France Will Fly Again, (short story) Air War Summer 1941
- Spike-Shy, (short story) Sports Novels Magazine June 1941
- Ambulance Plane Patrol, (novelette) Sky Fighters July 1941
- Dead Men Don’t Fly, (short story) Dare-Devil Aces July 1941
- Bombs with Wings, (short story) The American Eagle August 1941
- The Fighting Canadians, (novella) RAF Aces August 1941
- Bench Manager, (novella) Popular Sports Magazine Fall 1941
- Censored Wings, (short story) Sky Fighters September 1941
- Death Never Bluffs, (short story) G-Men Detective September 1941
- Fight for Your Supper, (novella) Dare-Devil Aces September 1941
- Little Man, What Next?, (short story) Exciting Sports Fall 1941
- Nazi Number Ten, (short story) Air War Fall 1941
- Eagle Wings Over Albania, (short story) The American Eagle October 1941
- The Five-for-One Kid, (short story) Dare-Devil Aces November 1941
- Miracle Wings, (short story) Sky Fighters November 1941
- Bullets Are My Bounty!, (short story) Big-Book Detective Magazine December 1941
- Wings of Sand, (short story) The American Eagle December 1941
- Wings of Vengeance, (short story) Air War Winter 1941/1942
- British Wings, (novella) RAF Aces Winter 1942
- Ground Ace, (short story) Sky Fighters January 1942
- Murder Is My Business, (novelette) New Detective Magazine January 1942
- You Can’t Kill an Eagle, (novelette) Dare-Devil Aces January 1942
- The Devil’s Ante, (short story) Big-Book Detective Magazine February 1942
- And I Mean Bunt!, (short story) Exciting Sports Spring 1942
- Battle Wings, (short story) Air War March 1942
- Get Me an Ace, (short story) Dare-Devil Aces March 1942
- Nazi Vultures, (novelette) Sky Fighters March 1942
- The Vulture of Thermopylae [Jigger Jones], (short story) RAF Aces March 1942
- D as in Dead, (short story) Big-Book Detective Magazine April 1942
- Black Wings of Nippon, (novelette) Sky Fighters May 1942
- The Dead Won’t Help You!, (novella) Dare-Devil Aces May 1942
- They Also Serve, (short story) Air War Spring 1942
- The Two for One Ace, (short story) RAF Aces Spring 1942
- Canadian Wings, (novelette) RAF Aces Summer 1942
- Fielder’s Choice, (novella) Popular Sports Magazine Summer 1942
- Grasshopper Wings, (short story) The American Eagle Summer 1942
- The Hell Diver’s Last Patrol, (short story) Dare-Devil Aces July 1942
- Wings of Victory, (novelette) Sky Fighters July 1942
- You Die Next!, (novelette) New Detective Magazine July 1942
- Last Command, (short story) Air War Summer 1942
- Little Man, You’re Dead, (short story) Big-Book Detective Magazine August 1942
- Blue Water Pilots, (novelette) Army-Navy Flying Stories Fall 1942
- A Messerschmitt for Moscow, (short story) Sky Fighters September 1942
- Strike Down My Killer!, (short story) Dare-Devil Aces September 1942
- Destination—Nippon!, (short story) Dare-Devil Aces November 1942
- Homicide Holiday, (novelette) New Detective Magazine November 1942
- The Navy Way, (short story) Air War Fall 1942
- The Silver Spoon, (short story) Sky Fighters November 1942
- Blue Water Eagles, (short story) Thrilling Adventures December 1942
- Commando Wings, (novelette) RAF Aces Winter 1943
- Malta Masquerade, (novella) Army-Navy Flying Stories Winter 1943
- Blue Water Devils, (short story) Exciting Navy Stories Spring 1943
- A Bullet for the Butcher, (short story) Battle Birds March 1943
- Dive-Bombers Don’t Miss, (short story) Dare-Devil Aces March 1943
- The Major Comes Back, (novella) Popular Sports Magazine Spring 1943
- Aces Come in Pairs, (short story) Fighting Aces May 1943
- The Hawk of Hongkong, (short story) Sky Fighters May 1943
- The Killer of Kalinin, (short story) Air War Spring 1943
- Licked—as in Luftwaffe, (short story) Dare-Devil Aces May 1943
- Aces Win the Hard Way, (novella) Sky Fighters July 1943
- Leatherneck Wings, (short story) Dare-Devil Aces August 1943
- Eagles Fly Back, (novelette) Dare-Devil Aces October 1943
- Happy Landing, (short story) Sky Fighters November 1943
- The Last Dogfight, (short story) Battle Birds November 1943
- Satan Flies No More, (short story) Dare-Devil Aces December 1943
- The Death Watch, (short story) Battle Birds January 1944
- Lightning Over New Guinea, (short story) Army-Navy Flying Stories Winter 1944
- Soldiers Who Never March, (short story) G-Men Detective Winter 1944
- Stolen Wings, (short story) Air War Winter 1944
- Suicide Target, (short story) RAF Aces Winter 1944
- Lair of the Vulture, (novelette) Dare-Devil Aces February 1944
- Airborne!, (novella) Battle Birds March 1944
- Eagles Fly Deep, (novella) Sky Fighters March 1944
- A Kiss for Kiska, (short story) RAF Aces Spring 1944
- Batteries for Today, (novella) Popular Sports Magazine Spring 1944
- The Catapult Plane, (short story) Air War Spring 1944
- Wings Are for the Free, (short story) Battle Birds May 1944
- Dead Engine Johnny, (short story) RAF Aces Summer 1944
- Eagles Don’t Quit, (short story) Dare-Devil Aces June 1944
- Wings for the Dead, (short story) Air War Summer 1944
- Tin Can Doom, (short story) Army-Navy Flying Stories Summer 1944
- Diamond Dynamite, (novelette) Exciting Sports Fall 1944
- Rats Don’t Live Long, (short story) Black Book Detective Fall 1944
- The Eyes of Torpedo 10, (short story) Army-Navy Flying Stories Fall 1944
- Death Flies at Dawn, (short story) Sky Fighters Winter 1945
- Jockey Jinx, (short story) Popular Sports Magazine Winter 1945
- Silver Steel, (short story) Thrilling Sports Winter 1945
- Burma Blitz, (short story) Sky Fighters Spring 1945
- Hot Corner, (novelette) Popular Sports Magazine Spring 1945
- Powerless Pilot, (short story) Army-Navy Flying Stories Spring 1945
- Sighted Sub, Spared Same, (short story) Army-Navy Flying Stories Summer 1945
- Death Chair, (short story) Thrilling Mystery Novel Magazine Summer 1945
- Let Murder Wait, (short story) New Detective Magazine July 1945
- Something Always Happens, (short story) The Phantom Detective August 1945
- Leyte Lullaby, (novelette) Sky Fighters Fall 1945
- See You in the Morgue, (short story) Thrilling Mystery Novel Magazine Fall 1945
- Wings Over the Gridiron, (novelette) Thrilling Football Fall 1945
- Big Moment, (short story) Exciting Sports Fall 1945
- Marked for Murder, (short story) The Phantom Detective October 1945
- If Anything Happens, (short story) Detective Novel Magazine December 1945
- Death Is My Business, (short story) New Detective Magazine January 1946
- Flat-Top Fire-Ball, (short story) Dare-Devil Aces January 1946
- Eagles Fly at Dawn, (short story) Dare-Devil Aces February 1946
- Out of This World, (short story) The Phantom Detective February 1946
- Jungle Wings, (short story) Dare-Devil Aces March 1946
- The Kamikaze Kid, (novelette) Sky Fighters Spring 1946
- Killers Don’t Last, (short story) Thrilling Mystery Novel Magazine March 1946
- Two Birds, One Stone, (short story) G-Men Detective April 1946
- The Ace from Down Under, (short story) Dare-Devil Aces May 1946
- Don’t Spare the Corpses, (short story) New Detective Magazine May 1946
- Killers Can’t Kick, (short story) Black Book Detective Summer 1946
- Let Me Kill You Tenderly [Chet Lacey], (novelette) Popular Detective June 1946
- Mission Completed, (novelette) Sky Fighters Summer 1946
- Wrong-Way Ace, (short story) Dare-Devil Aces July 1946
- Diamond Dust, (short story) Popular Sports Magazine Fall 1946
- Phantom Ace, (short story) Dare-Devil Aces September 1946
- Death Has Red Wings, (short story) Dare-Devil Aces November 1946
- Murder Never Waits, (short story) New Detective Magazine November 1946
- Till Death Do Us Part [Chet Lacey], (novelette) Popular Detective November 1946
- Darling, You Shouldn’t Have! [Chet Lacey], (short story) Popular Detective January 1947
- Pinch Pitcher, (short story) Exciting Sports Winter 1947
- Cinder Lightning, (short story) Popular Sports Magazine Spring 1947
- Mercury Maestro, (short story) Exciting Sports Spring 1947
- Blood on My Wings, (novelette) Sky Fighters Spring 1947
- Death Has No Love-Life [Chet Lacey], (novelette) Popular Detective May 1947
- Flight to Fate, (novelette) Sky Fighters Summer 1947
- You Can’t Run Forever, (short story) Thrilling Sports Summer 1947
- Don’t Give Me That!, (short story) Detective Novel Magazine July 1947
- I’ll See You Burn, (short story) G-Men Detective July 1947
- When in Doubt, Duck!, (short story) The Phantom Detective July 1947
- You Wake Up Dead [Chet Lacey], (novelette) Popular Detective July 1947
- Don’t Give It a Thought, (short story) Thrilling Sports Fall 1947
- The Human Side, (short story) Popular Football Fall 1947
- Make a Miracle, (short story) The Phantom Detective September 1947
- Murder Mustn’t Miss [Chet Lacey], (short story) Popular Detective September 1947
- Never Too Old, (short story) Popular Sports Magazine Fall 1947
- Wings to Burn, (novelette) Sky Fighters Fall 1947
- Nail for a Noose, (short story) Black Book Detective October 1947
- Bullets for Free [Chet Lacey], (short story) Popular Detective January 1948
- Clock Buster, (short story) New Sports Magazine January 1948
- Nobody Likes to Die, (novelette) G-Men Detective January 1948
- Cinder Dust, (short story) Exciting Sports February 1948
- Cinder Smoke, (short story) Fifteen Sports Stories February 1948
- Wings on Ice, (short story) Popular Sports Magazine February 1948
- Don’t Fool with Murder, (short story) Popular Detective March 1948
- Keep Your Gun, (short story) Sky Fighters Spring 1948
- Killers Are Chumps, (short story) G-Men Detective March 1948
- Come-Back, (short story) Exciting Sports April 1948
- Danger—Spikes at Work, (novelette) Popular Sports Magazine April 1948
- Tip from Tinian, (short story) Triple Detective Spring 1948
- And Let That Be a Lesson [Chet Lacey], (short story) Popular Detective May 1948
- Blue Water Cyclone, (short story) New Sports Magazine May 1948
- Mallet Master, (short story) Fifteen Sports Stories May 1948
- You Can’t Beat Class, (novelette) Thrilling Sports May 1948
- Blood on the Throttle, (short story) Sports Novels Magazine June 1948
- A Killer Flies High, (short story) Black Book Detective June 1948
- Tangled Wings, (novelette) Sky Fighters Summer 1948
- Catch Me a Killer [Chet Lacey], (short story) Popular Detective July 1948
- Cyclone on Wheels, (short story) Fifteen Sports Stories July 1948
- Goal Pirate, (short story) Sports Novels Magazine July 1948
- Iron Lightning, (short story) Thrilling Sports July 1948
- Word to the Wise, (short story) G-Men Detective July 1948
- Big Time Boy, (short story) Exciting Sports August 1948
- Blue Water Miracle, (short story) Popular Sports Magazine August 1948
- Guns Are Handy Things [Chet Lacey], (short story) Popular Detective September 1948
- Idea for Murder, (short story) Black Book Detective September 1948
- Mallet Marauder, (short story) Thrilling Sports September 1948
- Operation Fifty Below, (novelette) Sky Fighters Fall 1948
- By Hook or by Crook, (short story) Popular Sports Magazine October 1948
- Rainbow in His Glove, (novelette) Exciting Sports October 1948
- Studio for Killers [Dan Fowler], (novella) G-Men Detective November 1948
- Next Year’s Has-Been, (novelette) Popular Football Winter 1948
- You Never Know, (short story) Exciting Sports December 1948
- Front Page Pilot, (novelette) Sky Fighters Winter 1949
- Hot Iron, (short story) Popular Sports February 1949
- One for the Money, (short story) Exciting Sports February 1949
- The False Face Killer [Dan Fowler], (novella) G-Men Detective March 1949
- One Man’s Loss, (short story) Popular Baseball Spring 1949
- Thunder Sticker, (short story) Fifteen Sports Stories March 1949
- Pennant Pacer, (short story) Super Sports April 1949
- If at First, (short story) Sports Fiction May 1949
- Match Point, (short story) Popular Sports Summer 1949
- Plan for Murder, (short story) The Phantom Detective Summer 1949
- The Glittering Coffins [Dan Fowler], (novella) G-Men Detective Fall 1949
- The Hampered Hurdler, (short story) Exciting Sports Fall 1949
- Kill Me Next Time [Chet Lacey], (short story) Popular Detective September 1949
- Thunder Chucker, (short story) Fifteen Sports Stories November 1949
- Miracle in Lead, (short story) Exciting Sports Winter 1950
- Storm Clouds, (short story) Popular Sports Winter 1950
- A Certain Something, (short story) Thrilling Baseball Spring 1950
- Fixed Fight, (short story) Short Stories March 1950
- A Lot to Learn, (short story) Exciting Baseball Spring 1950
- Midget Mayhem, (short story) Exciting Sports Spring 1950
- Murder Passing Through, (short story) Thrilling Detective April 1950
- Yesterday’s Wings, (short story) Sky Fighters Spring 1950
- The Ghost Pitcher, (novelette) Popular Baseball Summer 1950
- Murder, Collect!, (short story) Famous Detective Stories June 1950
- Man Bait, (short story) The Phantom Detective Summer 1950
- Killing Isn’t Enough, (novelette) Famous Detective Stories August 1950
- Ride the Man Down, (short story) New Sports Magazine August 1950
- One Last Throw, (short story) Popular Football Fall 1950
- Pass and Pray!, (novelette) Thrilling Football Fall 1950
- The Hard-Boiled Coach, (novelette) Exciting Football Fall 1950
- Bunt Crazy, (novelette) Exciting Baseball Spring 1951
- Coach of the Year, (short story) Popular Sports Winter 1951
- It Takes a Champion, (short story) Popular Sports Spring 1951
- Jinx Jet, (short story) G-Men Detective Spring 1951
- Throw Him Curves, (novelette) Thrilling Sports Spring 1951
- Cops Learn Fast, (short story) Short Stories June 1951
- Winner Take Nothing, (short story) Five Sports Classics Magazine Summer 1951
- Lady with a Hunch, (short story) Popular Detective July 1951
- Glory Goal, (short story) Fifteen Sports Stories August 1951
- All-American Chump, (novelette) Thrilling Football Fall 1951
- Money Pitcher, (short story) All Sports September 1951
- Tough Brake, (short story) Detective Book Magazine Winter 1951/1952
- Ten Goal Man, (short story) Super Sports June 1952
- One Man’s Law, (short story) Texas Rangers September 1952
- Rookie on the Hook, (novelette) Super Sports September 1952
- Trail of Desire, (short story) Thrilling Ranch Stories Fall 1952
- Write Your Own Ticket, (short story) Thrilling Football Fall 1952
- Carbon Copy, (novella) Ten Story Sports October 1952
- Pay with Your Heart!, (short story) Rangeland Love Stories October 1952
- Guns in the Dark, (short story) West November 1952
- The Bullet, (short story) The Rio Kid Western January 1953
- Dead and Gone, (short story) Thrilling Detective Winter 1953
- Girl in Trouble, (short story) Black Book Detective Winter 1953
- Pennant for a Lady, (short story) Exciting Baseball Spring 1953
- Drop Dead, (short story) The Phantom Detective Spring 1953
- Glory Ropes a Wild One, (short story) Rangeland Romances May 1953
- Dope in the Dark, (short story) Dime Detective Magazine June 1953
- Dead Wrong, (short story) Triple Detective Summer 1953
- Gambler’s Pot, (short story) Double Action Western September 1953
- Shot in the Dark, (short story) The Saint Detective Magazine March 1955
- You’ll Be Back, (short story) The Pursuit Detective Story Magazine #17, September 1956
- Dig This Knife, (short story) Guilty Detective Story Magazine January 1958
- Payoff for Goldie, (short story) Trapped Detective Story Magazine February 1958
- Move In, Take Over, (short story) Guilty Detective Story Magazine March 1958
- I Can’t Die Now, (short story) Guilty Detective Story Magazine May 1958
- Chicken Blood, (novelette) Guilty Detective Story Magazine July 1958
- Dig That Ice!, (novelette) Guilty Detective Story Magazine September 1958
- The Jungle of the Streets, (novelette) Trapped Detective Story Magazine October 1958
- Real Easy Pushover, (novelette) Guilty Detective Story Magazine November 1958
- I Hate That Chick, (novelette) Trapped Detective Story Magazine June 1959
- Kid-Gang Violence, (novelette) Guilty Detective Story Magazine July 1959
- Deadly Queen of the Kid-Gang, (novelette) Trapped Detective Story Magazine August 1959
- Kill the One You Love, (novelette) Guilty Detective Story Magazine September 1960
- Be Yellow or Die, (short story) Trapped Detective Story Magazine February 1961
- A Knife in the Night, (novelette) Trapped Detective Story Magazine November 1961
- The Switchblade Knife, (novel) Guilty Detective Story Magazine December 1962
- How Dusty Ayres Was Born, (letter)
- Mercy Planes, (novella)
