= Jantzen =

Swimwear brand

- Type: Subsidiary
- Industry: Apparel/accessories
- Founded: Portland, Oregon (1910)
- Headquarters: Portland, Oregon, United States
- Products: Swimwear for professional and recreational swimming
- Parent: www.jantzenbrands.com
- Website: www.jantzen.com

Jantzen is a brand of swimwear that was established in 1916 and first appeared in the city of Portland, Oregon, United States. The brand name later replaced the name of the parent company that manufactured the branded products. The brand featured a logo image of a young woman, dressed in a red one-piece swimsuit and bathing hat, assuming a diving posture with outstretched arms and an arched back. Known as the Jantzen "Diving Girl", the image in various forms became famous throughout the world during the early twentieth century.

== History ==
=== Origin ===
Carl Christian Jantzen and brothers John A. Zehntbauer and C. Roy Zehntbauer founded the Portland Knitting Company, the predecessor of Jantzen Inc., in January 1910, in Portland, Oregon. It was a small knitting concern located in downtown Portland, and they produced sweaters, woolen hosiery and other knitted goods in the upstairs space, and sold them in the retail outlet downstairs. Carl Jantzen died from a heart attack on May 30, 1939 while passing through Sherman Hill, Idaho returning from a round-the-world tour.

=== Designs ===
The founders were members of the Portland Rowing Club, and in 1913, the company was asked to provide a rowing suit for use in the chilly mornings on the Willamette River. The story, as told by Zehntbauer in the company paper, the Jantzen Yarns:

I waited on him and took his order for these rowing trunks, to be made of a stitch like that of a cuff of a sweater so that they would stay up without a drawstring. After he tried them, he liked them so well that he came back for another pair and other members of the club heard about them, saw them and came in and ordered trunks like them. Nearly every member of the club who rowed had a pair. Later on, this same member came to me and asked if we could not make him a bathing suit of the same material ... a suit was made for him and he went to the ocean to bathe in the cold water. When he came back, he came into the store and told us that it was heavy and one could not swim well in it, but that he was well satisfied because it was so much warmer than any suit that he had ever had before and that it made ocean bathing a pleasure. ... this experience gave us the idea that a bathing suit made of this stitch, only in lighter weight, would be an excellent garment. We discussed this between ourselves and decided that we would order a needle bed for our sweater machine that would be fine enough to knit a rib-stitch bathing suit in a weight that would be comfortable. Roy, Carl, Joe Gerber and I were constantly in the water those days, either in the Y.M.C.A. swimming pool or in the river and we began to experiment for our own use on swimming suits made of this fine elastic fabric. We soon developed a suit which we found was the most excellent garment for swimming that we had ever seen.

The one-piece garment of pure wool that Carl Jantzen designed eventually became the prototype for the rib-stitch swimsuits that were first produced in 1915.

=== Brand name ===
After weeks of discussion and searching for a name which we could use as a trade-mark, we were unable to agree upon any of the many names which were submitted to us. We were using the brand P.K. at the time, the initials of the Portland Knitting Company ... Both the names Zehntbauer and Jantzen were suggested to us by our friends, but neither of us was willing to use our own name because it did not sound right to us ... Combinations were also suggested; one I remember was "Jan-Zen" or to be used without the hyphen, "Janzen. " Another was "Portknit". Up to the very last minute no one could decide to use either of the names suggested, so one day shortly previous to the time Mr. Gerber brought over his proposed advertising program, I was in his office to order stationery which needed to be printed at once, as we had waited as long as possible to make a decision on the trademark before printing new stationery. After a short conference I gave him the order to go ahead and print the stationery using the Jantzen trademark on all of it. The name of the company of course was not affected, being Portland Knitting Company making Jantzen trade-marked merchandise.

Following World War I, a national advertising campaign was launched with advertisements illustrating Jantzen suits placed in Vogue and the old Life Magazine. Jantzen was a leader in promotion of its new product. The cover of the advertisements featured the "Red Diving Girl", which became adopted as the logo of the company and recognizable worldwide.

=== Garment description ===
It was around this time that the company started to promote the idea of the swimsuit, as opposed to the bathing suit, and the tag-line "The Suit That Changed Bathing to Swimming":

Vintage Jantzen billboard

In 1919 and 1920, we advertised Jantzen bathing suits. It was not until 1921 that Mr. Dodson first conceived the idea of using the name "Swimming Suit" instead of bathing suit. Up to this time we had never heard the name "swimming suit" used, and we had been selling bathing suits for years and had come in contact with all kinds of advertising of these garments, which consisted then entirely of newspaper advertising by retailers, or trade paper advertising by manufacturers. So we are certain the name "swimming suit" was never used in advertising. Mr. Dodson was manager of the Broadway retail store at the time, and I remember distinctly the twinkle in his eye as he suggested the use of the name in our advertising. So from 1921 we discontinued the use of the name bathing suits and used swimming suits in all our copy. Since then many manufacturers throughout the world have advertised swimming suits in place of bathing suits.

=== Logo ===
Jantzen's Diving Girl was designed by Frank and Florenz Clark. She first made her appearance in advertisements in 1920, wearing a daring red suit, stocking cap and stockings, and first appeared on Jantzen swimming suits in 1923. Over the years, the stockings and stocking cap were dropped, and in the late 1940s, the suit became strapless. The whole design was modernized again in the 1980s. The Diving Girl remains a recognized international brand and is one of the longest lived apparel icons.

1920s	1940s	2000s

=== Development ===
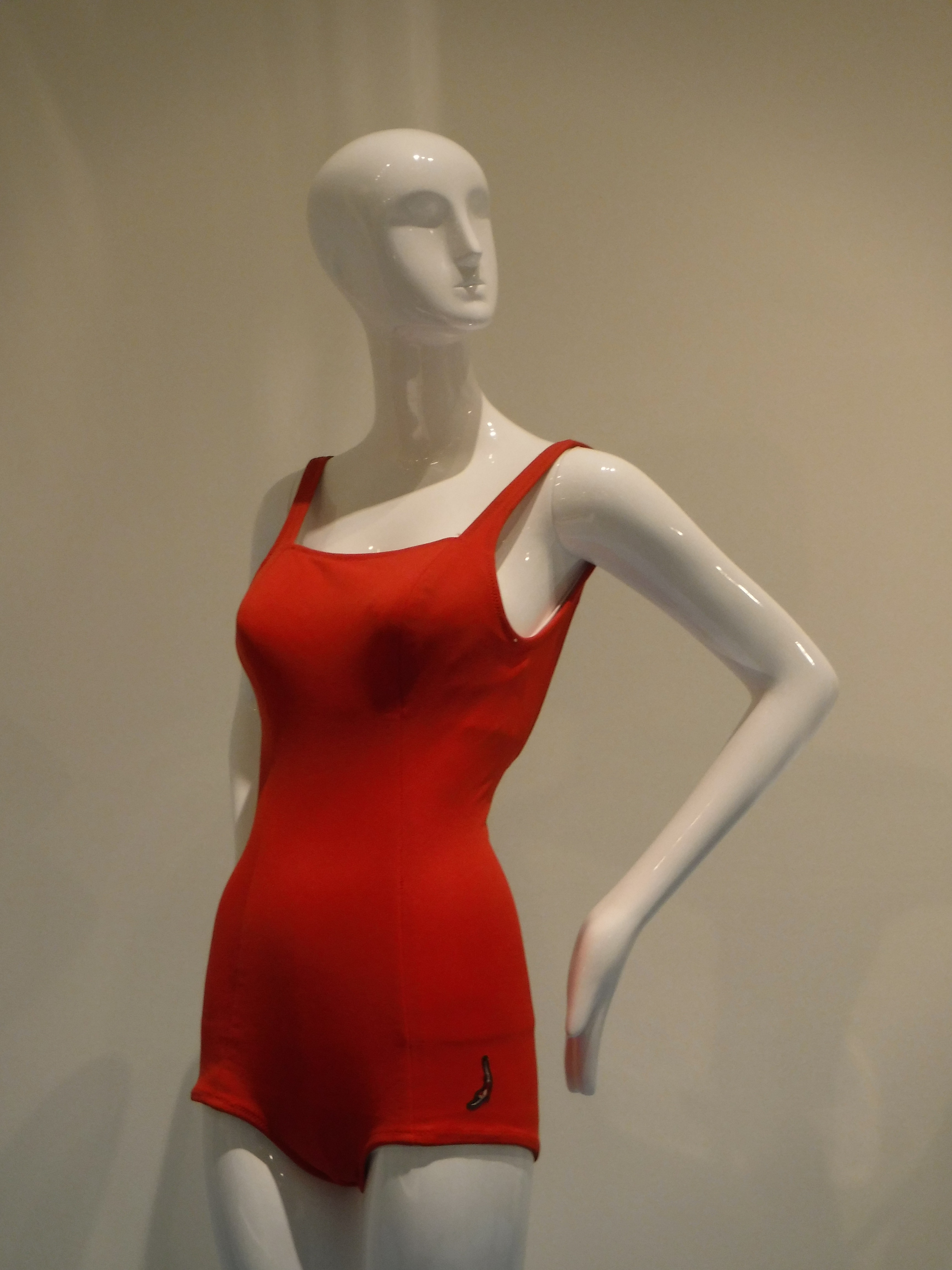
Jantzen Helanca knitted nylon swimsuit, ca. 1955–1965

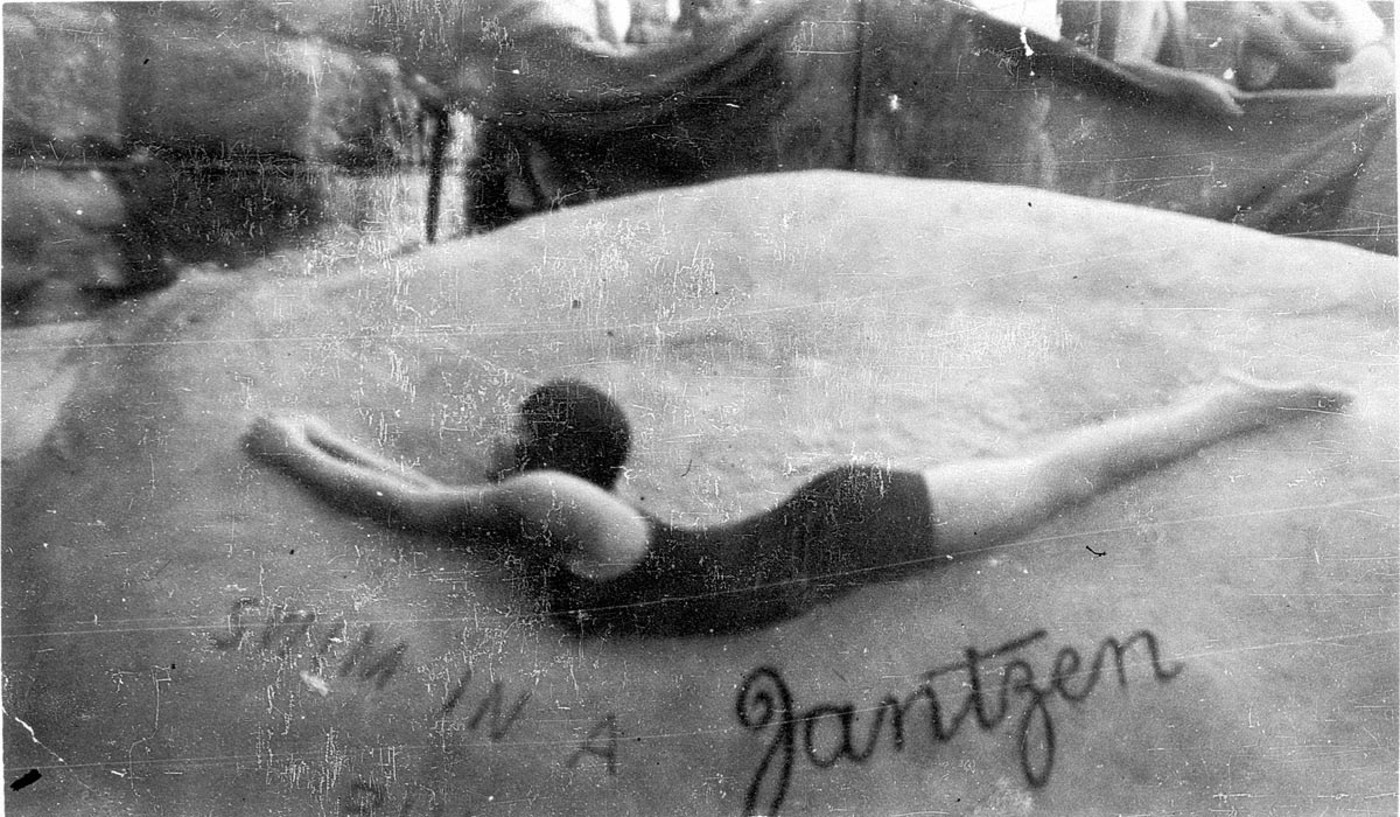
"Swim in a Jantzen" sand sculpture advertisement, by John Suchomlin at Manly Beach, Sydney c1940.

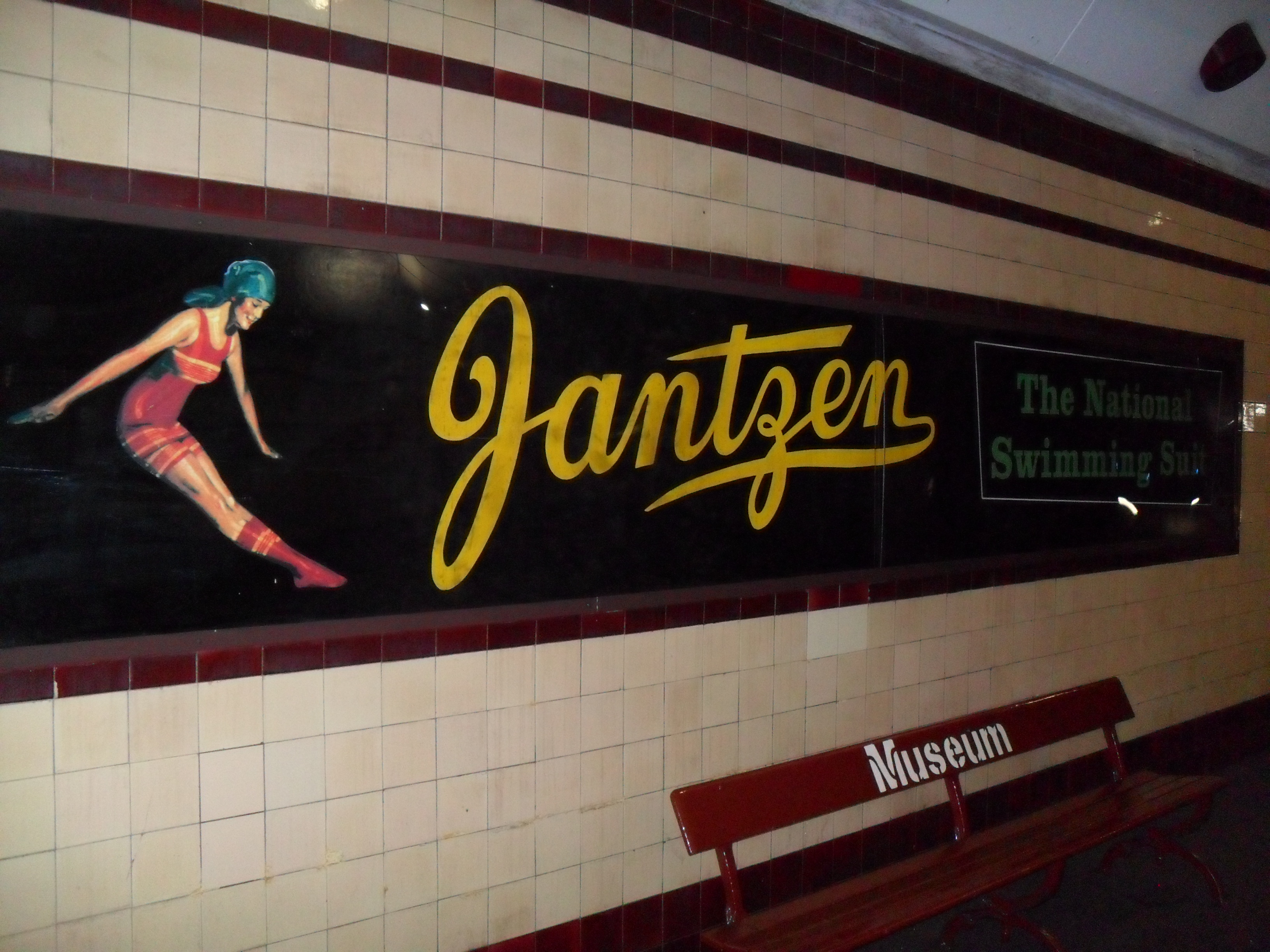
Heritage sign at Museum railway station, Sydney

During the inter-war years of the late 1920s and early 1930s the company established overseas manufacturing facilities and sales teams, notably in Europe. By 1932, Jantzen was reportedly the seventh most known trademark in the world.

In the 1940s, business perked up after Jantzen added sweaters, girdles and activewear to its basic swimwear line. The bikini was introduced in France in 1946 to set the style for brevity in swimwear and became a worldwide fashion classic.

In the 1950s, fashion designer Maurice Levin popularized the trend of the color pink worn on men through the Jantzen brand.

Throughout the 1970s and 1980s, Jantzen recognized that working women wanted attractive beachwear for weekends and vacations. In some resort areas, swim separates, cover-ups, and ankle-length beach skirts completed many swimsuit ensembles. Jantzen began to work with nylon and spandex to add stretch that holds shape. Jantzen also introduced a Trikini, combining a string bikini worn underneath a lacy, semi-transparent maillot.

=== Ownership and portfolio changes ===
In 1980, Jantzen was purchased by Blue Bell, and Blue Bell was acquired by VF Corporation in 1986. In 1995, the company ceased production of menswear to concentrate on women's apparel, returning to its roots in swimsuits. In 2002, the Jantzen trademark was purchased by Perry Ellis International, Inc. In 2019, Perry Ellis International, Inc. sold the Jantzen brand to Jantzen Brands Corporation.

== See also ==
- List of companies based in Oregon
- Jantzen Beach Amusement Park
- List of swimwear brands
