= Edward Dufner =

American painter and art teacher

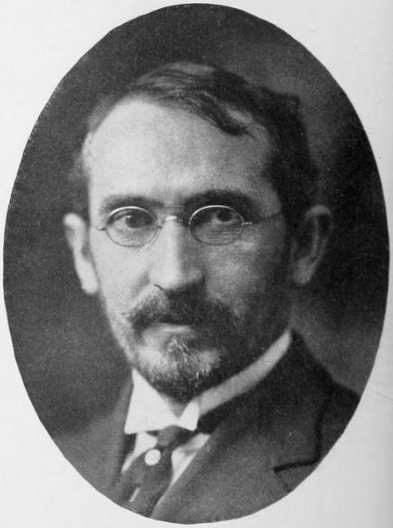
- Born: October 5, 1871; Buffalo, New York, U.S.
- Died: October 1, 1957 (aged 85); Short Hills, New Jersey, U.S.
- Resting place: Beaufort, South Carolina, U.S.
- Education: Art Students League of New York; Académie Julian; Académie Carmen
- Occupations: Painter, art teacher
- Spouses: Annie L. Collins (m. 1898; died 1931) Ilka Howells Renwick (m. 1933; died 1942): Fern Bradley

Edward Dufner (October 5, 1871 – October 1, 1957) was an American painter and art teacher.

== Life ==
Dufner was born on October 5, 1871 in Buffalo, New York. (Note: Some sources give a birth year of 1872.) He attended the Art Students League of New York, the Académie Julian, and the Académie Carmen.

Dufner taught at the Art Students League of Buffalo and New York, the Carnegie Institute of Technology, and the Traphagen School of Fashion. He became an Impressionist painter, and he won the Pennsylvania Academy of Fine Arts's Walter Lippincott Prize in 1924.

Dufner married Annie L. Collins on April 23, 1898. She died in 1931, and he remarried to the painter Ilka Howells Renwick on October 19, 1933. She died on January 2, 1942, and he married a third time to Fern Bradley.

He died at his home in Short Hills, New Jersey on October 1, 1957, and was buried in Beaufort, South Carolina.
