= Nat Schachner =

American writer (1895–1955)

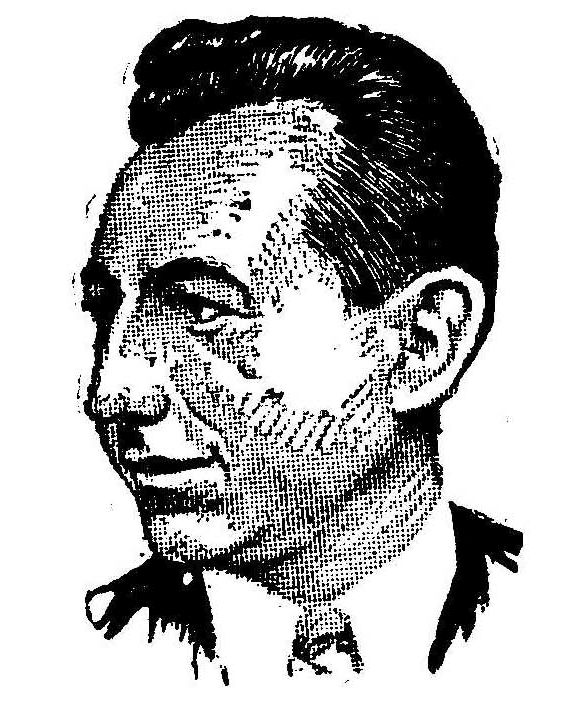
Nat Schachner c.1930

Nathaniel Schachner (January 16, 1895 – October 2, 1955), who published under the names Nat Schachner and Nathan Schachner, was an American writer, historian, and attorney, as well as an early advocate of the development of rockets for space travel. A prominent author of historical works on figures from America's Revolutionary Era, Schachner also was a regular contributor to science fiction early in its Golden Age (c. 1938–1946).

Best known for his biographies of American historical figures such as Thomas Jefferson and Alexander Hamilton, and as the creator of the Grandfather paradox, Schachner began his writing career contributing short stories to leading "pulp magazines" that specialized in science fiction, horror, mystery, and adventure genres. During the heart of the Great Depression, he contributed more than fifty stories to magazines such as Astounding Stories, Terror Tales, Horror Stories, Dime Mystery Magazine, and Fantastic Adventures. He then turned to writing historical non-fiction and fiction, gaining recognition for his prodigious research.

Schachner, a practicing attorney, was a founder and officer of the American Interplanetary Society, which pioneered liquid fuel rocketry in the United States in the early 1930s. Later known as the American Rocket Society, the organization eventually became part of the American Institute of Aeronautics and Astronautics, a professional society in the field of aerospace engineering that today has nearly 30,000 members world-wide.

== Bibliography ==
=== Historical works ===
- Aaron Burr: A Biography. New York: A.S. Barnes & Co., Inc. 1937.
- The Mediaeval Universities. New York: A.S. Barnes & Co., Inc. 1938.
- Alexander Hamilton. New York: D. Appleton-Century Company, Inc. 1946.
- The Price of Liberty: A History of the American Jewish Committee (PDF). New York: The American Jewish Committee. 1948.
- Thomas Jefferson: A Biography. New York: Thomas Yoscloff. 1951.
- The Founding Fathers. New York: Putnam. 1954.

=== Short stories and novelettes ===
Following is a listing of Schachner's short fiction as published in magazines during the 1930s and 1940s. The links provide access to either the stories or information on them from the Internet Speculative Fiction Database.

- "The Tower of Evil, Wonder Stories Quarterly, 1930 Summer
- "In 20,000 A.D.!, Wonder Stories, September 1930, co-author: Arthur Leo Zagat
- "The Song of the Cakes", Oriental Stories, Autumn 1930, co-author: Arthur Leo Zagat, Information
- "Back to 20,000 A.D., Wonder Stories, March 1931, co-author: Arthur Leo Zagat
- "The Emperor of the Stars, Wonder Stories, April 1931
- "The Dead-Alive", Weird Tales, April–May 1931, co-author: Arthur Leo Zagat
- "The Menace from Andromeda", Amazing Stories, April 1931, co-author: Arthur Leo Zagat
- "The Death-Cloud, Astounding Stories of Super-Science, May 1931, co-author: Arthur Leo Zagat
- "The Revolt of the Machines, Astounding Stories of Super-Science, July 1931, co-author: Arthur Leo Zagat
- "Venus Mines, Incorporated", Wonder Stories, August 1931, co-author: Arthur Leo Zagat
- "Exiles of the Moon", Part 1, Wonder Stories, September 1931, co-author: Arthur Leo Zagat
- "Exiles of the Moon", Part 2,Wonder Stories, October 1931, co-author: Arthur Leo Zagat
- "Exiles of the Moon", Part 3, Wonder Stories, November 1931, co-author: Arthur Leo Zagat
- "Pirates of the Gorm", Astounding Stories, May 1932
- "Slaves of Mercury", Astounding Stories, September 1932
- "Emissaries of Space", Wonder Stories Quarterly, Fall 1932
- "The Time Express", Wonder Stories, December 1932
- "The Memory of the Atoms", Wonder Stories, January 1933, co-author: R. Lacher
- "The Eternal Dictator", Wonder Stories, February 1933
- "The Robot Technocrat", Wonder Stories, March 1933
- "The Revolt of the Scientists", Wonder Stories, April 1933
- "The Revolt of the Scientists-II The Great Oil War", Wonder Stories, May 1933
- "The Revolt of the Scientists-III The Final Triumph", Wonder Stories, June 1933
- "Fire Imps of Vesuvius", Astounding Stories, October 1933
- "The Orange God", Astounding Stories, October 1933, pseudonym: Walter Glamis
- "Ancestral Voices", Astounding Stories, December 1933
- "Redmask of the Outlands", Astounding Stories, January 1934
- "The Time Imposter", Astounding Stories, March 1934
- "He from Procyon", Astounding Stories, April 1934
- "The Dragon of Iskander", Fantastic Stories of Imagination, April 1934, Information
- "The 100th Generation", Astounding Stories, May 1934
- "Marble Murderer", Dime Mystery Magazine, July 1934, Information
- "Stratosphere Towers", Astounding Stories, August 1934
- "The Living Equation", Astounding Stories, September 1934
- "Monsters of the Pit", Terror Tales, November 1934, Information
- "The Great Thirst", Astounding Stories, November 1934
- "They Dare Not Die", Terror Tales, January 1935, Information
- "The Ultimate Metal", Astounding Stories, February 1935
- "Thirst of the Ancients", Terror Tales, February 1935, Information
- "Death Takes a Bride", Terror Tales, March 1935, Information
- "Mind of the World, Astounding Stories, March 1935
- "When the Sun Dies", Astounding Stories, March 1935, pseudonym: Chan Corbett
- "Death Teaches School, Terror Tales, April 1935, Information
- "Satan's Antechamber", Thrilling Mysteries, April 1935, Information
- "The Devil's Brewers", Terror Tales, May 1935, Information
- "Hospital of the Damned", Horror Stories, June 1935, Information
- "Railroad to Hell", Terror Tales, June 1935, Information
- "The Orb of Probability", Astounding Stories, June 1935
- "Creatures of the Dusk", Terror Tales, July 1935, Information
- "The Son of Redmask", Astounding Stories, August 1935
- "Intra-Planetary", Astounding Stories, October 1935, pseudonym: Chan Corbett
- "I Am Not God", Part 1 of 2, Astounding Stories, October 1935
- "I Am Not God", Part 2 of 2, Astounding Stories, November 1935
- "The Isotope Men", Astounding Stories, January 1936
- "Entropy", Astounding Stories, March 1936
- "A Feast for Hell's Angels", Terror Tales, May 1936, Information
- "Reverse Universe", Astounding Stories, June 1936
- "Ecce Homo", Astounding Stories, June 1936, pseudonym: Chan Corbett
- "The Devil's Night Club", Dime Mystery Magazine, June 1936, Information
- "Death Unmasks at Midnight", Horror Stories, June–July 1936, Information
- "Pacifica", Astounding Stories, July 1936
- "The Return of the Murians", Astounding Stories, August 1936
- "The Saprophyte Men of Venus", Astounding Stories, October 1936
- "The Eternal Wanderer", Astounding Stories, November 1936
- "Wedding Night of the Damned", Terror Tales, November–December 1936, Information
- "The Thought Web of Minipar", Astounding Stories, November 1936, pseudonym: Chan Corbett
- "Cauldrons of the Damned", Horror Stories, December 1936-January 1937, Information
- "Infra-Universe", Part 1 of 2, Astounding Stories, December 1936
- "Infra-Universe", Part 2 of 2, Astounding Stories, January 1937
- "Beyond Infinity", Astounding Stories, January 1937, pseudonym: Chan Corbett
- "Beyond Which Limits", Astounding Stories, February 1937
- "The Shining One", Astounding Stories, May 1937
- "Satan's Children Are Hungry", Terror Tales, March–April 1937
- "The Shining One", Astounding Stories, May 1937
- "Earthspin", Astounding Stories, June 1937
- "The Plague of Evil Love", Terror Tales, June 1937, Information
- "Sterile Planet", Astounding Stories, July 1937
- "Crystallized Thought", Astounding Stories, August 1937
- "Past, Present and Future", Astounding Stories, September 1937
- "Children of Murder", Dime Mystery Magazine, October 1937, Information
- "Lost in the Dimensions", Astounding Stories, November 1937
- "City of the Rocket Horde", Astounding Stories, December 1937
- "Governess for the Mad", Terror Tales, January–February 1938, Information
- "Negative Space", Astounding Science Fiction, April 1938
- "Island of the Individualists", Astounding Science Fiction, May 1938
- "Factory for Death", Dime Mystery Magazine, September 1938, Information
- "The Sun-World of Soldus", Astounding Science Fiction, October 1938
- "The Flowering Corpses", Dime Mystery Magazine, October 1938, Information
- "Simultaneous Worlds", Part 1 of 2, Astounding Science Fiction, November 1938
- "Simultaneous Worlds", Part 2 of 2, Astounding Science Fiction, December 1938
- "The Corpses' Christmas Party, Horror Stories, December 1938-January 1939, Information
- "Parade of the Tiny Killers", Terror Tales, January 1939, Information
- "Welcome Mr. Death, Strange Detective Mysteries, January–February 1939, pseudonym: Chan Corbett, Information
- "Merchant of Screaming Death, Strange Detective Mysteries, January–February 1939, Information
- "Palooka from Jupiter", Astounding Science Fiction, February 1939
- "Terror of the Corpse Balloons", Strange Detective Mysteries, March–April 1939, Information
- "Worlds Don't Care", Astounding Science Fiction, April 1939
- "The Corpse Clinic", Strange Detective Mysteries, May 1939, Information
- "The Great Grey Hounds of Death", Strange Detective Mysteries, May–June 1939, pseudonym: Chan Corbett, Information
- "When the Future Dies", Astounding Science Fiction, June 1939
- "City of the Cosmic Rays", Astounding Science Fiction, July 1939
- "City Under the Sea", Fantastic Adventures, September 1939, Information
- "City of the Corporate Mind", Astounding Science Fiction, December 1939
- "Cold", Astounding Science Fiction, March 1940
- "Space Double", Astounding Science Fiction, May 1940
- "Master Gerald of Cambray", Unknown Fantasy Fiction, June 1940, Information
- "Runaway Cargo", Astounding Science Fiction, October 1940
- "Old Fireball", Astounding Science Fiction, June 1941
- "Jurisdiction", Astounding Science Fiction, August 1941
- "The Return of the Circe", Fantastic Adventures, August 1941
- "Beyond All Weapons", Astounding Science Fiction, November 1941
- "Eight Who Came Back", Fantastic Adventures, November 1941
- "The Strange Story of Two American Boys", Crack Detective Stories, September 1945
- "Frontier Sam", Speed Western Stories, September 1946

== Bibliography ==
- Winter, Frank H. (1984). Prelude to the Space Age. Washington, DC: Smithsonian Institution Press. ISBN 0-87474-963-8.
