= G-8 and His Battle Aces =

American air-war pulp magazine (1930–1944)

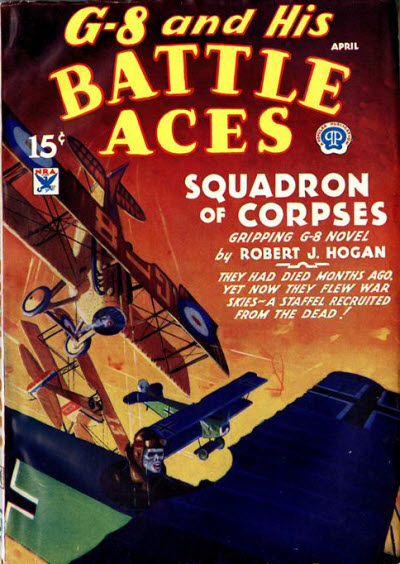
Cover of the April 1934 issue, by Frederick Blakeslee

G-8 and His Battle Aces was an American air-war pulp magazine published from 1930 to 1944. It was one of the first four magazines launched by Popular Publications when it began operations in 1930, and first appeared for just over two years under the title Battle Aces. The success of Street & Smith's The Shadow, a hero pulp (a magazine with a lead novel in each issue featuring a single character), led Popular to follow suit in 1933 by relaunching Battle Aces as a hero pulp: the new title was G-8 and His Battle Aces, and the hero, G-8, was a top pilot and a spy. Robert J. Hogan wrote the lead novels for all the G-8 stories, which were set in World War I. Hogan's plots featured the Germans threatening the Allied forces with extraordinary or fantastic schemes, such as giant bats, zombies, and Martians. He often contributed stories to the magazines as well as the lead novel, though not all the short stories were by him. The cover illustrations, by Frederick Blakeslee, were noted for their fidelity to actual planes flown in World War I.

The magazine originally appeared monthly, but changed to bimonthly during World War II, ceasing publication in 1944. Pulp historian Lee Server suggests that it was Hogan's writing that allowed the magazine to last as long as it did, since by the last issue, in June 1944, the aircraft portrayed had long been obsolete.

== Publication history ==
Issue data for G-8 and His Battle Aces
	Jan	Feb	Mar	Apr	May	Jun	Jul	Aug	Sep	Oct	Nov	Dec
1930										1/1	1/2	1/3
1931	1/4	2/1	2/2	2/3	2/4	3/1	3/2	3/3	3/4	4/1	4/2	4/3
1932	4/4	5/1	5/2	5/3	5/4	6/1	6/2	6/3	6/4	7/1	7/2	7/3
1933										1/1	1/2	1/3
1934	1/4	2/1	2/2	2/3	2/4	3/1	3/2	3/3	3/4	4/1	4/2	4/3
1935	4/4	5/1	5/2	5/3	5/4	6/1	6/2	6/3	6/4	7/1	7/2	7/3
1936	7/4	8/1	8/2	8/3	8/4	9/1	9/2	9/3	9/4	10/1	10/2	10/3
1937	10/4	11/1	11/2	11/3	11/4	12/1	12/2	12/3	12/4	13/1	13/2	13/3
1938	13/4	14/1	14/2	14/3	14/4	15/1	15/2	15/3	15/4	16/1	16/2	16/3
1939	16/4	17/1	17/2	17/3	17/4	18/1	18/2	18/3	18/4	19/1	19/2	19/3
1940	19/4	20/1	20/2	20/3	20/4	21/1	21/2	21/3	21/4	22/1	22/2	22/3
1941	22/4	23/1	23/2	23/3		23/4		24/1		24/2		24/3
1942		24/4		25/1		25/2		25/3		25/4		26/1
1943		26/2		26/3		26/4		27/1		27/2		27/3
1944		27/4		28/1		28/2						
Issues of Battle Aces and G-8 and His Battle Aces, showing volume and issue number. The colors identify the editors for each issue, though note that one source asserts Steeger rather than Clancy edited the first incarnation of the magazine. Eugene A. Clancy Harry Steeger

In the summer of 1927, Aviation Stories and Mechanics was launched. It was the first magazine to specialize in fiction about flying, and pulp historian Robert Sampson suggests that Charles Lindbergh's recent flight across the Atlantic was part of the reason for public interest in aviation. A number of similarly formatted titles focused on flying appeared soon after, including Air Stories and Wings. The first magazine to concentrate on aerial warfare was Dell Magazine's War Birds, which appeared in early 1928.

In 1930 Popular Publications was started by Harry Steeger and Harold Goldsmith; they launched four pulp magazines that year, one of which was Battle Aces, with the first issue dated October 1930. It published stories about war in the air: in a contemporary writers' magazine, Steeger declared the requirements for submissions were "scorching action, close plot, and dramatic situations. Dogfights and binges are good color, but don't rely on them to sell the story". Pulp historian Ed Hulse comments that Steeger's earlier experience as a pulp editor with Dell Magazines "had not gone to waste", and lists Battle Aces as "[one of] the most enjoyable air-war pulps of the Thirties". It initially sold about 80% of the 100,000 copies printed; the other three pulps started by Popular were selling in the 40-60% range. Despite this initial success it only lasted two years, ceasing publication with the December 1932 issue.

In 1931, rival publisher Street & Smith launched The Shadow, a hero pulp magazine featuring a lead novel in every issue about The Shadow, a mysterious crimefighter. Battle Aces ceased publication in December 1932, but Steeger had noticed the success of The Shadow (as had other publishers) and decided to launch his own single-character pulps, including The Spider, about another crime-fighter. To come up with another title Steeger approached Robert J. Hogan, one of his favorite authors. Hogan had recently begun selling to the pulps, and many of his stories were about war in the air, so it was natural for him to propose that the new magazine would be an air-war pulp. Steeger relaunched Battle Aces, under the new title G-8 and His Battle Aces, with the first issue dated October 1933.

The magazine changed to bimonthly publication in early 1941 and ceased in 1944, with the last issue dated June of that year. By that time World War II's aircraft were far more advanced than the ones Hogan and Blakeslee were depicting, and pulp historian Lee Server comments that it was only because of Hogan's "readable prose and great imagination" that G-8 and His Battle Aces lasted as long as it did.

During its last year of publication, a few issues were published as a special British edition.

== Contents and reception ==
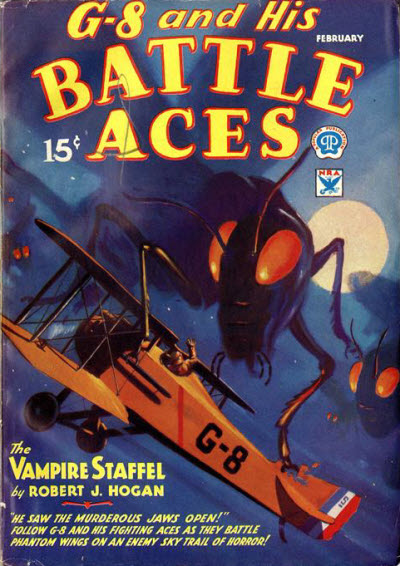
Cover of the February 1934 issue, by Frederick Blakeslee

Every issue of the revived magazine contained a lead novel by Hogan, about G-8, a top pilot who was also a spy. The character was named after a ranch in Colorado where Hogan stayed one summer. In the magazine G-8 fought the Germans in World War I in every issue, with a cast of villains that included Herr Stahlmaske, whose scarred face was hidden by a steel mask; Chu Lung, an Asian helping the Germans; and Herr Grun, a voodoo priest. Many of the plots involved science fiction or the supernatural: in the first issue, for example, the Germans have discovered a species of giant bat with poisonous breath, and Herr Doktor Krueger, another of G-8's antagonists, is planning to attack the Allies with the deadly essence of their poison. The cover, by Frederick Blakeslee, shows G-8 riding one of the giant bats. Other plots featured rockets, beast-men, wolf-men, zombies, mummies, and Martians. G-8 had two sidekicks, Nippy Weston and Bull Martin, who debuted in the first novel and appeared regularly thereafter.

Later, Hogan's widow, Betty Nevin, recalled that the fantastic elements were probably included to ensure enough variety in the plots to support a long series. Pulp historian Robert Weinberg describes the novels as "straight formula...[they] varied little in content or style from month to month". There are many similarities between the series and the plots of stories by Donald E. Keyhoe about Captain Philip Strange, which appeared in the rival magazine Flying Aces; Hulse comments that "it is very difficult to believe that Robert J. Hogan wasn't directed to plagiarize the series for his G-8 and His Battle Aces novels", though Hulse adds that Hogan's work is not as strong as Keyhoe's. Hogan was paid between $700 and $1,000 for each novel; he was also selling stories to other magazines at the same time, and between late 1935 and early 1936 also wrote seven novels for The Mysterious Wu Fang, another Popular title. At Hogan's peak he was writing about two million words per year, or perhaps more—a greater output than any other pulp author.

In addition to the novels, each issue contained short stories, usually including one by Hogan. These were straightforward air-war stories with no fantastic elements. The early issues also contained reminiscences by famous World War I pilots of both sides. The cover art was almost always by Blakeslee, whose work is described by pulp art expert George Hocutt as "a delight to critical readers" because of its accuracy; according to Hocutt, Blakeslee's depictions of the fantastic elements in the G-8 plots always included faithful representations of the original World War I fighter planes.

In the June 1936 issue, Popular Publications printed a credo of their work in G-8 and His Battle Aces. Pulp historian Robert Lesser calls it a pulp oath: it starts by asking why so many of their fellow Americans are bored with their lives, and then asserts: "Not to swell our chests, nor to in any way inflate our heads, the publishers of G-8 and His Battle Aces wish to point with pride. We are staging a war against boredom—a peacetime battle which fortunately, does not call for the use of lethal weapons...we believe we are giving [our readers] a thrill. That in the reading of this magazine, some small refuge has been found from the relentless forces of boredom. To all of you who have written...may your reading thrills increase, and may your cares be cast by the wayside."

== Bibliographic details ==
Battle Aces published 27 issues on a regular monthly schedule between October 1930 and December 1932. Each issue was pulp format, 128 pages, and priced at 20 cents. There were six volumes of four numbers each and a final seventh volume of three numbers. When the title changed to G-8 and His Battle Aces, the volume numbering restarted at 1/1; this sequence ran to 27 volumes of four issues with a final volume of two issues. The new version of the magazine was published on a regular monthly schedule from its first issue in October 1933 until April 1941, after which it became bimonthly until the final issue in June 1944. The price was cut to 15 cents when the title changed, and to 10 cents with the March 1936 issue; the page count dropped from 128 to 112 pages in October 1935, rising to 114 pages in August 1941 before dropping again towards the end of the run, with the final issues being only 82 pages long. Although Hulse writes that Steeger edited Battle Aces, the bibliographer Phil Stephensen-Payne records Eugene A. Clancy as the editor. Both agree that Steeger was the editor after the title changed to G-8 and His Battle Aces.

== Sources ==
- Goulart, Ron (1973) [1972]. An Informal History of the Pulp Magazines. New York City: Ace Books. ISBN 0-441-37070-5.
- Hocutt, George (1997). "The Cover Art of the Air-War Pulps". In Lesser, Robert (ed.). Pulp Art. New York: Gramercy Books. pp. 126–128. ISBN 0-517-20058-9.
- Hulse, Ed (2013). The Blood 'N' Thunder Guide to Pulp Fiction. Morris Plains, New Jersey: Murania Press. ISBN 978-1-4910-1093-8.
- Lesser, Robert (1997). Pulp Art. New York: Gramercy Books. ISBN 0-517-20058-9.
- Murray, Will; Weinberg, Robert (1985). "The Shadow". In Tymn, Marshall B.; Ashley, Mike (eds.). Science Fiction, Fantasy and Weird Fiction Magazines. Westport, Connecticut: Greenwood Press. pp. 570–573. ISBN 0-3132-1221-X.
- Robinson, Frank M.; Davidson, Lawrence (2007). Pulp Culture: The Art of Fiction Magazines. Portland, Oregon: Collectors Press. ISBN 978-1-933112-30-5.
- Sampson, Robert (1987). Spider. Bowling Green, Ohio: Bowling Green State University Popular Press. ISBN 0-87972-398-X.
- Sampson, Robert (1993). Yesterday's Faces Volume 6: Violent Lives. Bowling Green, Ohio: Bowling Green State University Popular Press. ISBN 0-87972-615-6.
- Server, Lee (2002). Pulp Fiction Writers. New York: Checkmark Books. ISBN 0-8160-4577-1.
- Weinberg, Robert (1985). "G-8 and His Battle Aces". In Tymn, Marshall B.; Ashley, Mike (eds.). Science Fiction, Fantasy and Weird Fiction Magazines. Westport, Connecticut: Greenwood Press. pp. 288–289. ISBN 0-3132-1221-X.
