= Wing loading =

Total mass divided by area of wing

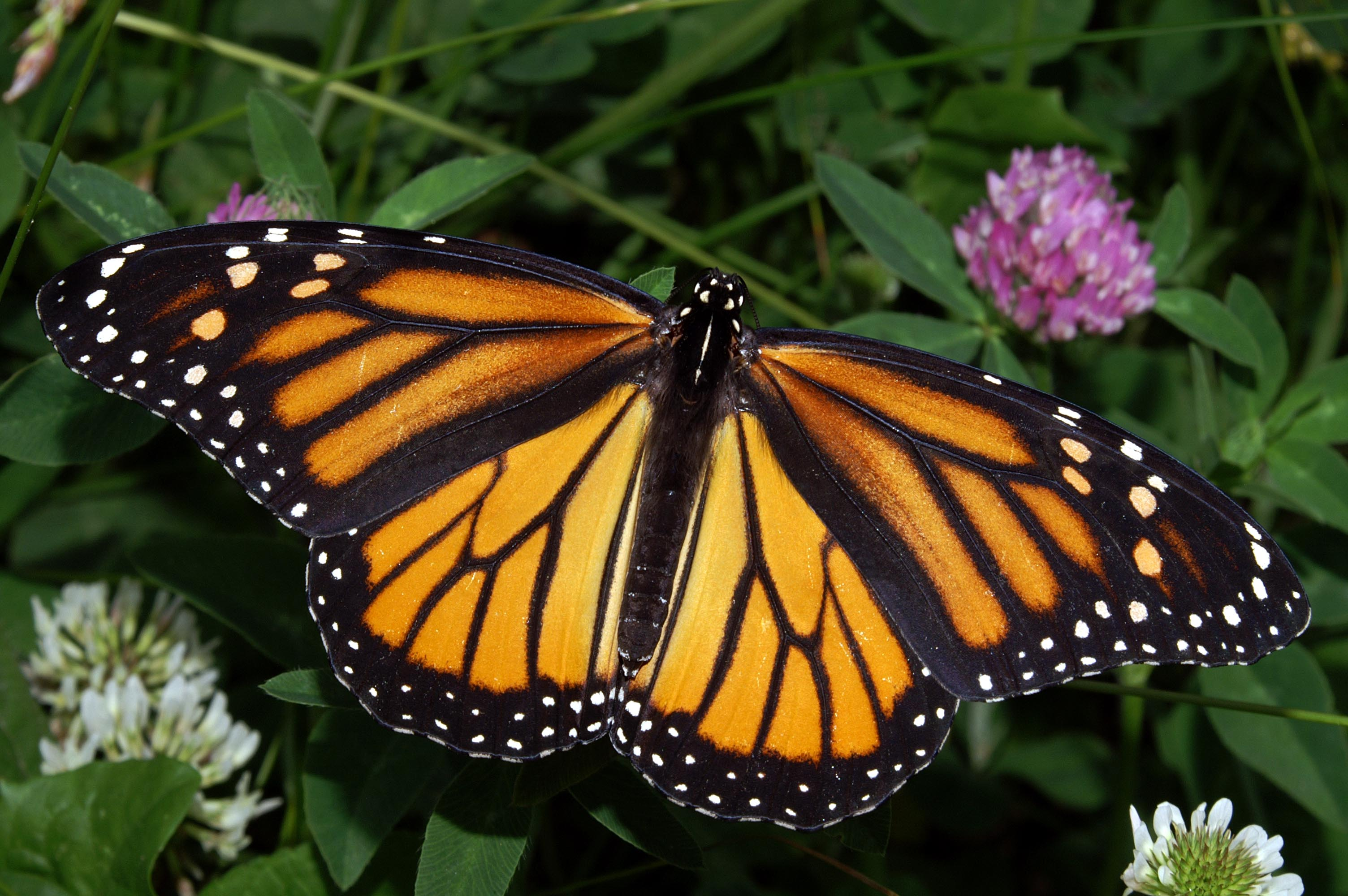
The Monarch Butterfly has a very low 0.168 kg/m^{2} wing loading

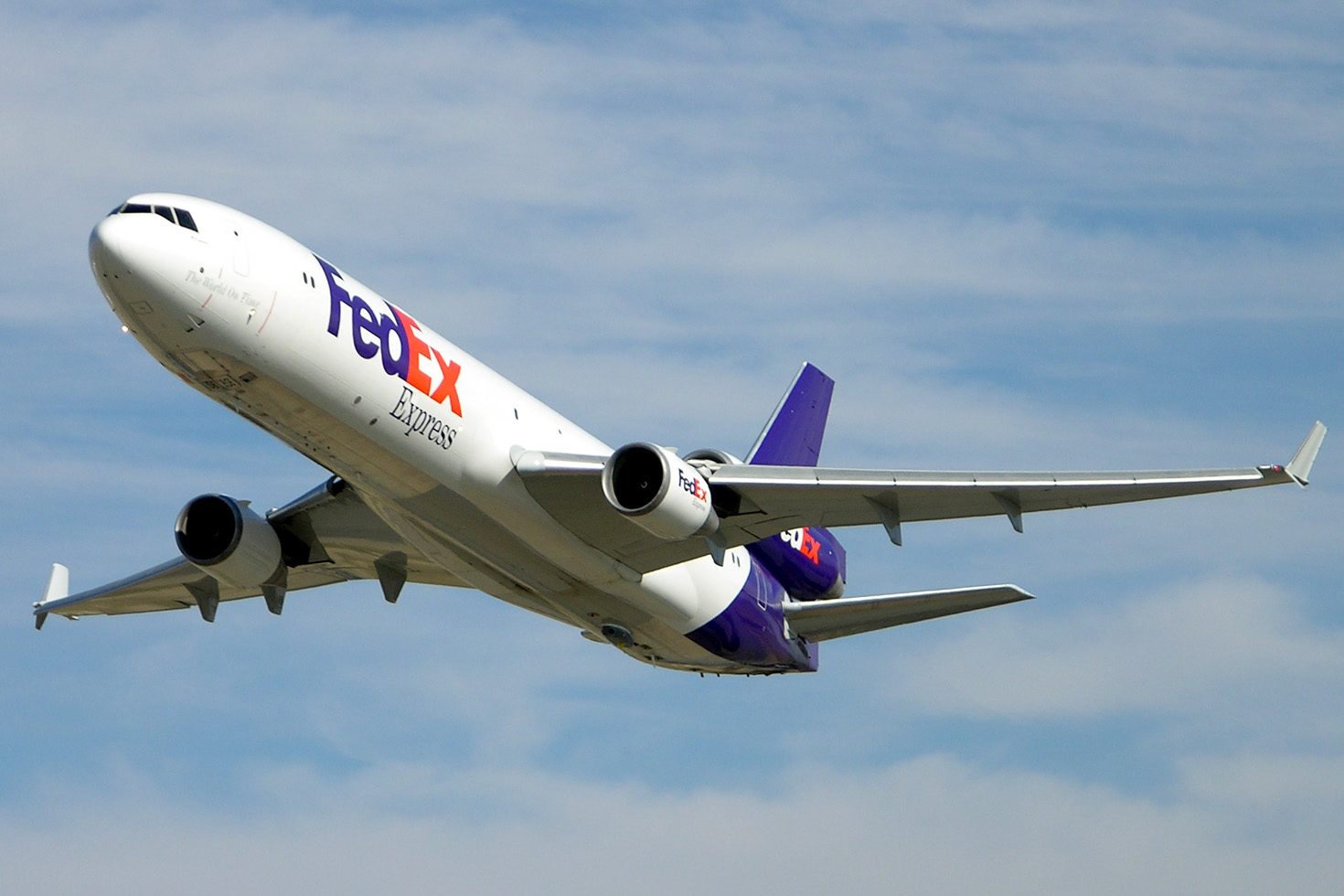
The McDonnell Douglas MD-11 has a high 837 kg/m^{2} maximum wing loading

In aerodynamics, wing loading is the total weight of an aircraft or flying animal divided by the area of its wing. (Note: For aircraft, this includes area of ailerons.) The stalling speed, takeoff speed and landing speed of an aircraft are partly determined by its wing loading.

The faster an aircraft flies, the more its lift is changed by a change in angle of attack, so a smaller wing is less adversely affected by vertical gusts. Consequently, faster aircraft generally have higher wing loadings than slower aircraft in order to avoid excessive response to vertical gusts.

A higher wing loading also decreases maneuverability. The same constraints apply to winged biological organisms.

== Range of wing loadings ==
Wing loading examples
Aircraft	Type	Introduction	MTOW	Wing area	kg/m^{2}	lb/sqft
Monarch Butterfly	Animal	Cenozoic			0.168	0.034
Birds (Note: 138 species from 10 g to 10 kg, from small passerines to swans and cranes)	Animal	Cretaceous			1–20	0.20–4.10
Bird flight upper critical limit	Animal				25	5.1
Ozone Buzz Z3 MS	Paraglider	2010	75–95 kg (165–209 lb)	25.8 m^{2} (278 sq ft)	2.9–3.7	0.59–0.76
Wills Wing Sport 2 155	Hang glider	2004	94.8–139.8 kg (209–308 lb)	14.4 m^{2} (155 sq ft)	6.6–9.7	1.4–2.0
Gin Fluid 11	Speed flyer	2010	140 kg	11 m^{2} (120 sq ft)	12.7	2.6
Upper limit	Microlift glider	2008	220 kg (490 lb) max.	12.2 m^{2} (131 sq ft) min. (Note: at max weight)	18	3.7
CAA (UK) regulations	microlight wing loading limit	2008 (Note: legislation enacted)	450 kg (990 lb) max. (Note: for a two seat landplane)	18 m^{2} (190 sq ft) min. (Note: at max weight)	25	5.1
Schleicher ASW 22	Glider	1981	850 kg (1,870 lb)	16.7 m^{2} (180 sq ft)	50.9	10.4
Piper Warrior	General aviation	1960	1,055 kg (2,326 lb)	15.14 m^{2} (163.0 sq ft)	69.7	14.3
Beechcraft Baron	General aviation twin-engine	1960	2,313 kg (5,099 lb)	18.5 m^{2} (199 sq ft)	125	26
Supermarine Spitfire	Fighter (WWII)	1938	3,039 kg (6,700 lb)	22.48 m^{2} (242.0 sq ft)	135	28
Beechcraft Airliner	Airliner (commuter)	1968	4,727 kg (10,421 lb)	25.99 m^{2} (279.8 sq ft)	182	37
Learjet 31	Business jet	1990	7,031 kg (15,501 lb)	24.57 m^{2} (264.5 sq ft)	286	59
Mikoyan MiG-23	Fighter (variable-geometry)	1970	17,800 kg (39,200 lb)	34.16–37.35 m^{2} (367.7–402.0 sq ft)	477–521	98–107
Lockheed F-104 Starfighter	Fighter (multi-role)	1958	13,166 kg (29,026 lb)	18.22 m^{2} (196.1 sq ft)	722.6	148.0
General Dynamics F-16	Fighter (multi-role)	1978	19,200 kg (42,300 lb)	27.87 m^{2} (300.0 sq ft)	688.9	141.1
McDonnell Douglas F-15 Eagle	Fighter (air superiority)	1976	30,845 kg (68,002 lb)	56.5 m^{2} (608 sq ft)	546	112
Mikoyan-Gurevich MiG-25	Fighter (interceptor)	1970	36,720 kg (80,950 lb)	61.4 m^{2} (661 sq ft)	598	122
Lockheed SR-71 Blackbird	Strategic reconnaissance aircraft	1966	68,946 kg (152,000 lb)	170 m^{2} (1,800 sq ft)	406	83
Fokker F27	Airliner (turboprop)	1958	19,773 kg (43,592 lb)	70 m^{2} (750 sq ft)	282	58
Fokker F28 Fellowship	Airliner (regional jet)	1969	33,000 kg (73,000 lb)	78.97 m^{2} (850.0 sq ft)	418	86
Boeing 737-400	Airliner (narrow-body)	1984	62,820 kg (138,490 lb)	91.04 m^{2} (979.9 sq ft)	690	140
Boeing 737-900ER	Airliner (narrow-body)	2007	85,139 kg (187,699 lb)	124.6 m^{2} (1,341 sq ft)	683	140
Airbus A321XLR	Airliner (narrow-body)	2024	101,015 kg (222,700 lb)	122.4 m^{2} (1,318 sq ft)	825	169
Boeing 767-300ER	Airliner (wide-body)	1982	181,437 kg (400,000 lb)	283.3 m^{2} (3,049 sq ft)	640	130
Boeing 757-300	Airliner (narrow-body)	1982	115,665 kg (254,998 lb)	185 m^{2} (1,990 sq ft)	625	128
Concorde	Airliner (supersonic)	1976	187,000 kg (412,000 lb)	358.2 m^{2} (3,856 sq ft)	522	107
Rockwell B-1B Lancer	Bomber (variable-geometry)	1983	148,000 kg (326,000 lb)	181.2 m^{2} (1,950 sq ft)	818	168
McDonnell Douglas MD-11	Airliner (wide-body)	1990	283,720 kg (625,500 lb)	338.9 m^{2} (3,648 sq ft)	837	171
Boeing 777-300ER	Airliner (wide-body)	2004	351,533 kg (774,998 lb)	436.8 m^{2} (4,702 sq ft)	805	165
Airbus A340-500/600	Airliner (wide-body)	2002	365,000 kg (805,000 lb)	437.3 m^{2} (4,707 sq ft)	835	171
Boeing 747-400	Airliner (wide-body)	1988	396,830 kg (874,860 lb)	525 m^{2} (5,650 sq ft)	756	155
Airbus A380	Airliner (wide-body)	2007	575,000 kg (1,268,000 lb)	845 m^{2} (9,100 sq ft)	680	140

== Effect on performance ==
Wing loading is a useful measure of the stalling speed of an aircraft. Wings generate lift owing to the motion of air around the wing. Larger wings move more air, so an aircraft with a large wing area relative to its mass (i.e., low wing loading) will have a lower stalling speed. Therefore, an aircraft with lower wing loading will be able to take off and land at a lower speed (or be able to take off with a greater load). It will also be able to turn at a greater rate.

=== Effect on takeoff and landing speeds ===
The lift force L on a wing of area A, traveling at true airspeed v is given by
$$L = \tfrac{1}{2} \rho v^2 A C_L,$$
where ρ is the density of air, and C_{L} is the lift coefficient. The lift coefficient is a dimensionless number that depends on the wing cross-sectional profile and the angle of attack. At steady flight, neither climbing nor diving, the lift force and the weight are equal. With L/A = Mg/A = W_{S}g, where M is the aircraft mass, W_{S} = M/A the wing loading (in mass/area units, i.e. lb/ft^{2} or kg/m^{2}, not force/area) and g the acceleration due to gravity, this equation gives the speed v through
$$v^2 = \frac{2gW_S}{\rho C_L}.$$
As a consequence, aircraft with the same C_{L} at takeoff under the same atmospheric conditions will have takeoff speeds proportional to $\sqrt{W_S}$. So if an aircraft's wing area is increased by 10% and nothing else is changed, the takeoff speed will fall by about 5%. Likewise, if an aircraft designed to take off at 150 mph grows in weight during development by 40%, its takeoff speed increases to $150 \sqrt{1.4}$ ≈ 177 mph.

Some flyers rely on their muscle power to gain speed for takeoff over land or water. Ground nesting and water birds have to be able to run or paddle at their takeoff speed before they can take off. The same is true for a hang-glider pilot, though they may get assistance from a downhill run. For all these, a low W_{S} is critical, whereas passerines and cliff-dwelling birds can get airborne with higher wing loadings.

=== Effect on turning performance ===
To turn, an aircraft must roll in the direction of the turn, increasing the aircraft's bank angle. Turning flight lowers the wing's lift component against gravity and hence causes a descent. To compensate, the lift force must be increased by increasing the angle of attack by use of up elevator deflection, which increases drag. Turning can be described as "climbing around a circle" (wing lift is diverted to turning the aircraft), so the increase in wing angle of attack creates even more drag. The tighter the turn radius attempted, the more drag induced; this requires that power (thrust) be added to overcome the drag. The maximum rate of turn possible for a given aircraft design is limited by its wing size and available engine power: the maximum turn the aircraft can achieve and hold is its sustained turn performance. As the bank angle increases, so does the g-force applied to the aircraft, this having the effect of increasing the wing loading and also the stalling speed. This effect is also experienced during level pitching maneuvers.

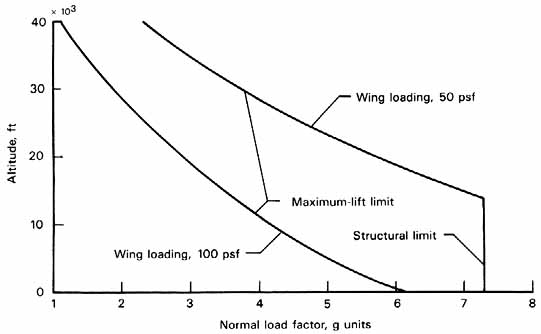
Load factor varying with altitude at 50 or 100 lb/ft^{2}

As stalling is due to wing loading and maximum lift coefficient at a given altitude and speed, this limits the turning radius due to maximum load factor. At Mach 0.85 and 0.7 lift coefficient, a wing loading of 50 lb/sq ft (240 kg/m^{2}) can reach a structural limit of 7.33g up to 15,000 feet (4,600 m) and then decreases to 2.3g at 40,000 feet (12,000 m). With a wing loading of 100 lb/sq ft (490 kg/m^{2}) the load factor is twice smaller and barely reaches 1g at 40,000 ft (12,000 m).

Aircraft with low wing loadings tend to have superior sustained turn performance because they can generate more lift for a given quantity of engine thrust. The immediate bank angle an aircraft can achieve before drag seriously bleeds off airspeed is known as its instantaneous turn performance. An aircraft with a small, highly loaded wing may have superior instantaneous turn performance, but poor sustained turn performance: it reacts quickly to control input, but its ability to sustain a tight turn is limited. A classic example is the F-104 Starfighter, which has a very small wing and high 723 kg/m^{2} (148 lb/sq ft) wing loading.

At the opposite end of the spectrum was the large Convair B-36: its large wings resulted in a low 269 kg/m^{2} (55 lb/sq ft) wing loading that could make it sustain tighter turns at high altitude than contemporary jet fighters, while the slightly later Hawker Hunter had a similar wing loading of 344 kg/m^{2} (70 lb/sq ft). The Boeing 367-80 airliner prototype could be rolled at low altitudes with a wing loading of 387 kg/m^{2} (79 lb/sq ft) at maximum weight.

Like any body in circular motion, an aircraft that is fast and strong enough to maintain level flight at speed v in a circle of radius R accelerates towards the center at $v^2/R$. This acceleration is caused by the inward horizontal component of the lift, $L sin\theta$, where $\theta$ is the banking angle. Then from Newton's second law,
$$\frac{Mv^2}{R} = L \sin\theta = \frac{1}{2} v^2\rho C_L A \sin\theta.$$
Solving for R gives
$$R = \frac{2Ws}{\rho C_L \sin\theta}.$$
The lower the wing loading, the tighter the turn.

Gliders designed to exploit thermals need a small turning circle in order to stay within the rising air column, and the same is true for soaring birds. Other birds, for example, those that catch insects on the wing, also need high maneuverability. All need low wing loadings.

=== Effect on stability ===
Wing loading also affects gust response, the degree to which the aircraft is affected by turbulence and variations in air density. A small wing has less area on which a gust can act, both of which serve to smooth the ride. For high-speed, low-level flight (such as a fast low-level bombing run in an attack aircraft), a small, thin, highly loaded wing is preferable: aircraft with a low wing loading are often subject to a rough, punishing ride in this flight regime. The F-15E Strike Eagle has a wing loading of 650 kg/m^{2} (130 lb/sq ft) (excluding fuselage contributions to the effective area), whereas most delta-wing aircraft (such as the Dassault Mirage III, for which W_{S} = 387 kg/m^{2}) tend to have large wings and low wing loadings.

Quantitatively, if a gust produces an upward pressure of G (in N/m^{2}, say) on an aircraft of mass M, the upward acceleration a will, by Newton's second law be given by
$$a = \frac{GA}{M} = \frac{G}{W_S},$$
decreasing with wing loading.

=== Effect of development ===
A further complication with wing loading is that it is difficult to substantially alter the wing area of an existing aircraft design (although modest improvements are possible). As aircraft are developed they are prone to "weight growth"—the addition of equipment and features that substantially increase the operating mass of the aircraft. An aircraft whose wing loading is moderate in its original design may end up with very high wing loading as new equipment is added. Although engines can be replaced or upgraded for additional thrust, the effects on turning and takeoff performance resulting from higher wing loading are not so easily reconciled.

=== Water ballast use in gliders ===
Modern gliders often use water ballast carried in the wings to increase wing loading when soaring conditions are strong. By increasing the wing loading the average speed achieved across country can be increased to take advantage of strong thermals. With a higher wing loading, a given lift-to-drag ratio is achieved at a higher airspeed than with a lower wing loading, and this allows a faster average speed across country. The ballast can be ejected overboard when conditions weaken or prior to landing.

== Design considerations ==
=== Fuselage lift ===
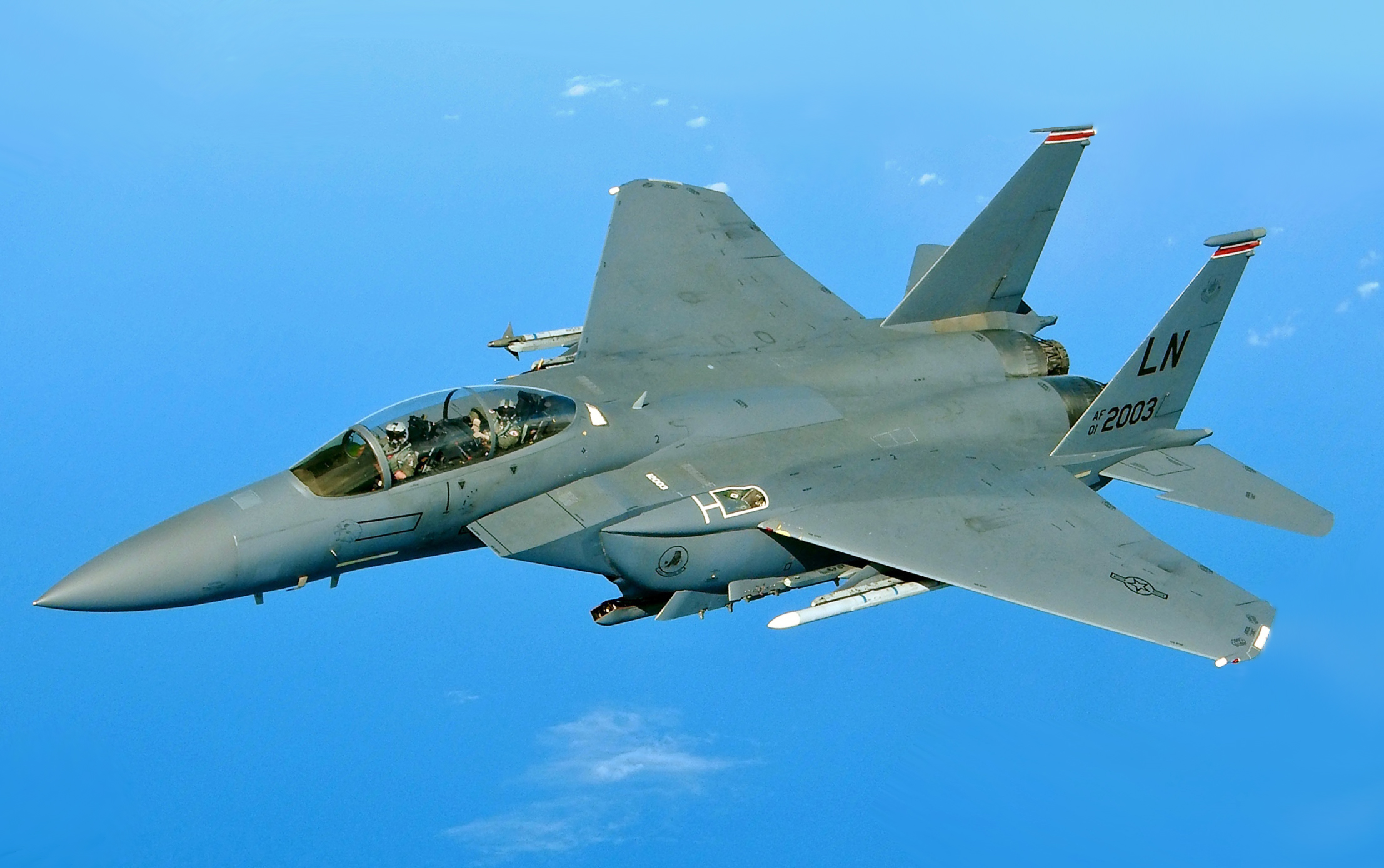
The F-15E Strike Eagle has a large relatively lightly loaded wing

A blended wing-fuselage design such as that found on the General Dynamics F-16 Fighting Falcon or Mikoyan MiG-29 Fulcrum helps to reduce wing loading; in such a design the fuselage generates aerodynamic lift, thus improving wing loading while maintaining high performance.

=== Variable-sweep wing ===
Aircraft like the Grumman F-14 Tomcat and the Panavia Tornado employ variable-sweep wings. As their wing area varies in flight so does the wing loading (although this is not the only benefit). When the wing is in the forward position takeoff and landing performance is greatly improved.

=== Flaps ===
Like all aircraft flaps, Fowler flaps increase the camber and hence the maximum value of lift coefficient (C_{Lmax}) lowering the landing speed. They also increase wing area, decreasing the wing loading, which further lowers the landing speed.

High lift devices such as certain flaps allow the option of smaller wings to be used in a design in order to achieve similar landing speeds compared to an alternate design using a larger wing without a high lift device. Such options allow for higher wing loading in a design. This may result in beneficial features, such as higher cruise speeds or a reduction in bumpiness at high speed low altitude flight (the latter feature is very important for close air support aircraft roles). For instance, Lockheed's Starfighter uses internal Blown flaps to achieve a high wing loading design (723 kg/m^{2}) which allows it a much smoother low altitude flight at full throttle speeds compared to low wing loading delta designs such as the Mirage 2000 or Mirage III (387 m^{2}). The F-16 which has a relatively high wing loading of 689 m^{2} uses leading-edge extensions to increase wing lift at high angles of attack.

== See also ==
- Disk loading
- Lift coefficient
- Wing warping
