= Robert J. Hogan =

Robert J. Hogan may refer to:

- Robert Hogan (actor) (1933–2021), American actor
- Robert J. Hogan (author) (1897–1963), American author
