= G-8 (character) =

Publication information
- Publisher: Popular Publications
- First appearance: G-8 and His Battle Aces #1
- Created by: Robert J. Hogan

In-story information
- Alter ego: Unknown
- Supporting character of: Battle; Nippy Weston; Bull Martin

G-8 was a heroic aviator and spy during World War I in pulp fiction. He starred in his own title G-8 and His Battle Aces, published by Popular Publications. All stories were written by Robert J. Hogan, under his own name. The title lasted 110 issues, from October 1933 to June 1944. Many of the novels have been reprinted by a wide range of publishers including comic books.

While not as dramatic a pulp character as Doc Savage or the Shadow, his stories were often outlandish, with many supernatural or science fiction elements. G-8's true identity was never revealed. He had a girlfriend, a nurse who aided his group, and her name as well was never revealed. His English manservant was named Battle. His wing-men were the short Nippy Weston, who flew an aircraft numbered 13, and the tall and muscular but superstitious Bull Martin, whose aircraft was numbered 7. Both of them were Americans. His adventures entailed fighting against the lethal super technology that was constantly created by the Kaiser's mad scientists. Reoccurring villains included Herr Doktor Krueger, the Steel Mask, and Grun.

A character based on G-8 made two appearances in the comic book Planetary alongside many other pulp analogues as part of a society for the betterment of humankind.

== List of G-8 and His Battle Aces titles ==
1. The Bat Staffel
2. Purple Aces
3. Ace of the White Death
4. The Midnight Eagle
5. The Vampire Staffel
6. The Skeleton Patrol
7. Squadron of Corpses
8. The Invisible Staffel
9. The Dynamite Squadron
10. The Dragon Patrol
11. The Hurricane Patrol
12. The Panther Squadron
13. The Spider Staffel
14. The Mad Dog Squadron
15. The Blizzard Staffel
16. The X-Ray Eye
17. Squadron of the Scorpion
18. The Death Monsters
19. The Cave Man Patrol
20. The Gorilla Staffel
21. The Sword Staffel
22. Wings of the Juggernaut
23. The Headless Staffel
24. Staffel of Beasts
25. Claws of the Sky Monster
26. Staffel of Invisible Men
27. Staffel of the Floating Heads
28. The Blood Bat Staffel
29. Skeletons of the Black Cross
30. The Patrol of the Dead
31. Scourge of the Sky Beast
32. The Wings of Satan
33. Patrol of the Cloud Crusher
34. Curse of the Sky Wolves
35. Vultures of the Purple Death
36. Wings of Invisible Doom
37. Skies of Yellow Death
38. Death Rides the Ceiling
39. Patrol of the Mad
40. Scourge of the Steel Mask
41. Patrol of the Murder Masters
42. Fangs of the Sky Leopard
43. Vultures of the White Death
44. Flight of the Dragon
45. Flight from the Grave
46. Patrol of the Purple Clan
47. Vengeance of the Vikings
48. Flight of the Green Assassin
49. The Hand of Steel
50. The Flight of the Hell Hawks
51. The Drome of the Damned
52. Satan Paints the Sky
53. Wings for the Dead
54. Patrol of the Phantom
55. The Black Aces of Doom
56. The Flames of Hell
57. Patrol of the Iron Hand
58. Fangs of the Serpent
59. Aces of the Damned
60. Patrol of the Sky Vulture
61. The Condor Rides with Death
62. Flying Coffins of the Damned
63. The Bloody Wings of the Vampire
64. Raiders of the Silent Death
65. The Sky Serpent Flies Again
66. The Black Wings of the Raven
67. Death Rides the Last Patrol
68. Three Fly with Satan
69. Flight of the Death Battalion
70. Wings of the Black Terror
71. Patrol of the Iron Scourge
72. Wings of the White Death
73. The Black Buzzard Flies to Hell
74. Red Fangs of the Sky Emperor
75. The Falcon Flies with the Damned
76. Sky-Guns for the Murder Master
77. White Wings for the Dead
78. Sky Coffins for Satan
79. Wings of the Dragon Lord
80. The Green Scourge of the Sky Raiders
81. Red Wings for the Death Patrol
82. The Damned Will Fly Again
83. Death Rides the Midnight Patrol
84. Bloody Wings for a Sky Hawk
85. Red Skies for the Squadron of Satan
86. Here Flies the Hawk of Hell
87. Squadron of the Damned
88. Death To the Hawks of War
89. Hordes of the Wingless Death
90. Raiders of the Red Death
91. Wings of the Doomed
92. Fangs of the Winged Cobra
93. Death is My Destiny
94. Squadron of the Flying Dead
95. Horde of the Black Eagle
96. The Death Divers
97. Raiders of the Death Patrol
98. The Mark of the Vulture
99. The Death Master's Last Patrol
100. Wings of the Gray Phantom
101. The Squadron of Death Flies High
102. The Patrol to the End of the World
103. Wings of the Hawks of Death
104. Scourge of the Sky Monster
105. Winged Beasts of Death
106. Bombs from the Murder Wolves
107. Wings of the Iron Claw
108. The Devil's Sky Trap
109. Wings of the Death Monster
110. Wings of the Death Tiger

== Reprints ==
During the craze for hero pulp reprints in the 1970s started by the success of Doc Savage reprints, Berkley Books reprinted 8 G-8 novels. The first 3 had covers by Jim Steranko and a logo inspired by Doc Savage's. After that, the covers reprinted the original pulp covers.

In more recent years, some G-8 novels were reprinted by small presses like Adventure House. Adventure House recently started a reprint series of G-8 in similar size to the original pulps, including covers and interior artwork. So far, they have reprinted over 40 issues.
