= Dime Mystery Magazine =

American weird menace pulp magazine

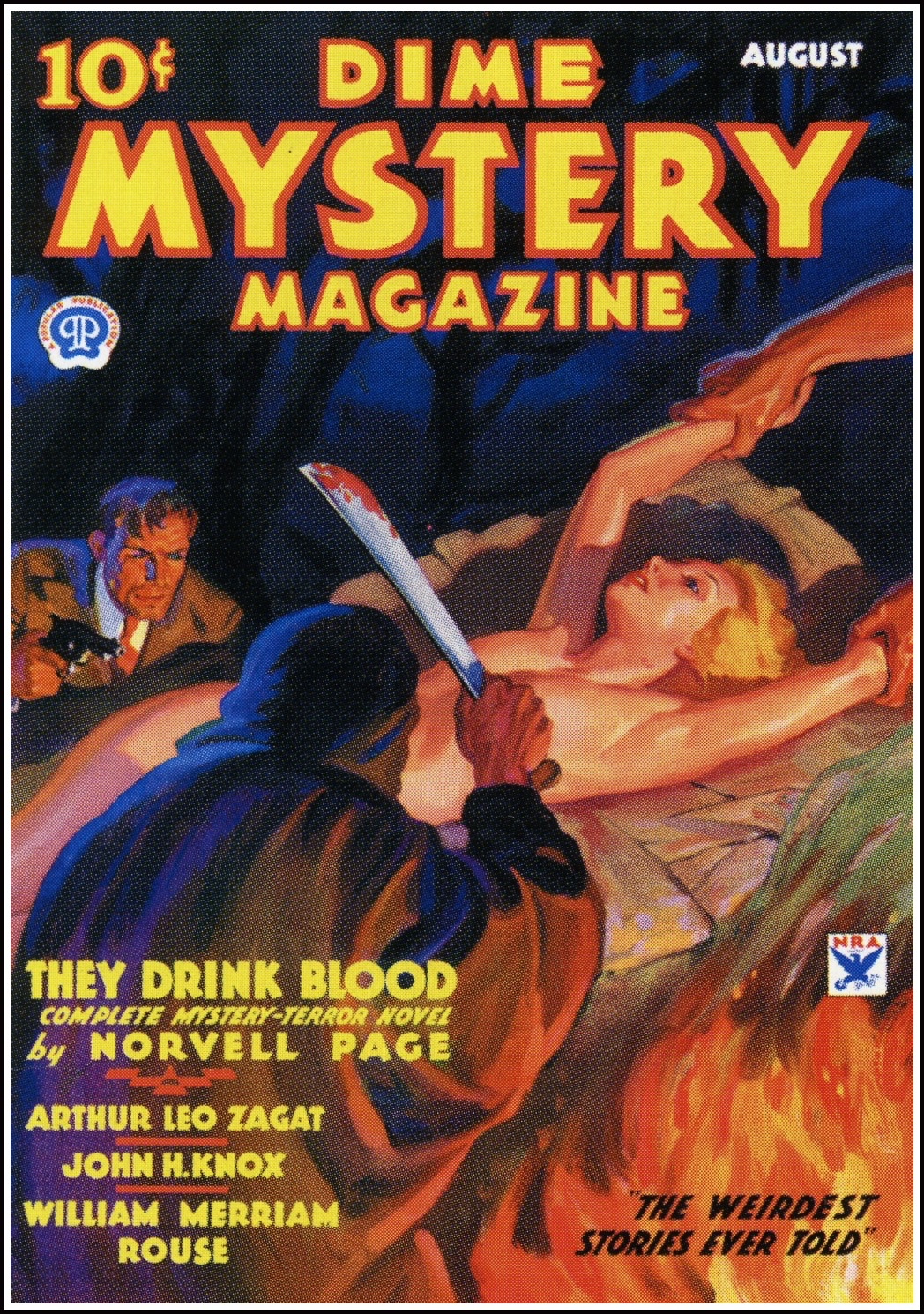
Cover of the August 1934 issue

Dime Mystery Magazine was an American pulp magazine published from 1932 to 1950 by Popular Publications. Titled Dime Mystery Book Magazine during its first nine months, it contained ordinary mystery stories, including a full-length novel in each issue, but it was competing with Detective Novels Magazine and Detective Classics, two established magazines from a rival publisher, and failed to sell well. With the October 1933 issue the editorial policy changed, and it began publishing horror stories. Under the new policy, each story's protagonist had to struggle against something that appeared to be supernatural, but would eventually be revealed to have an everyday explanation. The new genre became known as "weird menace" fiction; the publisher, Harry Steeger, was inspired to create the new policy by the gory dramatizations he had seen at the Grand Guignol theater in Paris. Stories based on supernatural events were rare in Dime Mystery, but did occasionally appear.

Popular Publications soon started more magazines in the same genre, and weird menace magazines began to appear from other publishers as well. In 1937 the emphasis on sex and sadism in Dime Mystery's stories increased, but in 1938 the editorial policy switched back to detective stories. These stories now focused on detectives with some unusual handicap such as amnesia or hemophilia. There was a brief return to weird menace stories, after which more ordinary detective stories filled the magazine until it ceased publication in 1950. Most of the stories in Dime Mystery were considered low-quality pulp fiction by critics, but some well-known authors also appeared in the magazine, including Edgar Wallace, Ray Bradbury, Norvell Page, and Wyatt Blassingame. The last few issues appeared under the title 15 Mystery Stories.

== Publishing history ==
In 1929, Harry Steeger was employed at Dell Publishing as a magazine editor, and Harold Goldsmith was at Ace Publications, working as a business manager. Steeger persuaded Goldsmith to partner with him in starting a pulp magazine publishing company, and the new company, Popular Publications, was launched the following year. The pulp market at the time was changing focus, with detective stories increasing in popularity, so two of the first four magazines launched by Popular were in the detective genre: Gang World and Detective Action. These were followed in 1932 by Dime Detective, which quickly became one of Popular's most successful pulps, focusing on lurid crimes. Dime Mystery Book Magazine was begun at the end of 1932 as a sister magazine to Dime Detective, with a novel in each issue. The new magazine's sales were weak, but rather than cancel Dime Mystery, Steeger decided to change it to focus more on a particular kind of horror story: ones which appeared to be about supernatural events but had rational explanations.

The new policy, which began with the October 1933 issue, was a success, and the magazine stayed on a monthly schedule for the next seven years. Popular soon launched more titles in the same genre, which has since become known as "weird menace" fiction. The first was Terror Tales, launched in September 1934; it was followed by Horror Stories, in January 1935. Popular's competitors soon followed suit, with Thrilling Mystery appearing in October 1935 from Thrilling Publications.

In a 1977 interview, Steeger recalled paying between three-quarters of a cent and a cent per word for fiction during the 1930s, although there were a handful of authors who could command higher rates. These rates, and Popular's policy of paying on acceptance, helped separate Popular from the smaller companies, who might pay half a cent per word, and only on publication, not on acceptance. The rate increased in the 1940s, going up by at least a half-cent per word, and more for some writers. The schedule changed from monthly to bimonthly starting in early 1941. World War II brought paper shortages, but Steeger later recalled that the effect was to increase the percentage of each print run that sold and that as a result, Popular's sales were higher during the war than at any other time in the company's life.

Pulp magazines began to lose readership after the war, and sales declined over the next few years. Dime Mystery's run ended in 1950; the last issue was dated October/November of that year.

== Contents and reception ==
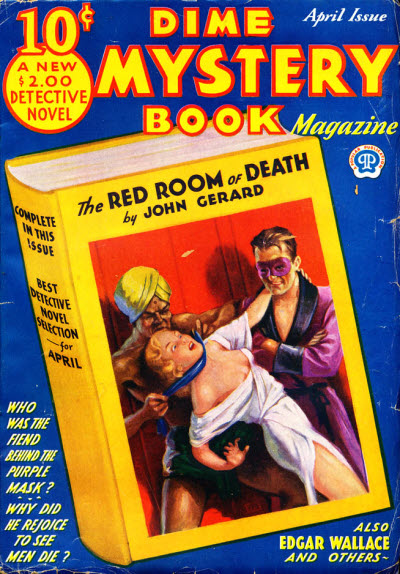
Cover of the April 1933 issue, by Rafael DeSoto, showing the book cover motif used for the first year

For the first year, Dime Mystery focused on straightforward detective and mystery fiction. The title was initially Dime Mystery Book Magazine, and the selling point, as the cover declared, was "A New $2.00 Detective Novel". The novels were complete in each issue, rather than serialized. The cover art reinforced this message by depicting a hardcover book, with the detective or mystery scene painted as the cover of the book. The short fiction included abridged reprints of stories by Edgar Wallace in his "J.G. Reeder" series. The lead character, Reeder, had been a prosecutor in London in the stories' original publication in Flynn's magazine in the 1920s, but for Dime Mystery all the British references were eliminated, and Reeder became a district attorney.

Dime Mystery competed with two magazines that also published a complete novel in each issue: Detective Novels Magazine and Detective Classics. Both were published by Fiction House and, although both cost twice as much as Dime Mystery, at 20 cents, they were well-established, reprinting long stories by well-known writers such as Edgar Wallace, Leslie Charteris, and Ellery Queen. By comparison, according to Jess Nevins, a historian of horror fiction, Dime Mystery's fiction was "slow, boring, and unpopular". Rather than giving up on the magazine, which would have meant losing its second-class mailing permit, (Note: Keeping the permit meant Steeger could continue to publish the magazine without delay. Starting a new magazine would have meant waiting for approval of a new permit.) Steeger decided to change its focus to horror. Steeger was inspired by performances he had seen at the Grand Guignol Theater in Paris, which provided gory dramatizations of murder and torture. The title was changed to Dime Mystery Magazine in July 1933, and the new policy took effect with the October 1933 issue. There were no more complete novels; the word "Book" had already been dropped from the cover two issues earlier. Rogers Terrill, the editor, now wanted lead stories no longer than about thirty-five thousand words, instead of about fifty-five thousand words. Terrill outlined what he was looking for in the August 1933 issue of Writer's Digest, which was read by many of the writers he was trying to attract: apparently supernatural mysteries, but "no matter how grotesque, there must be a logical explanation". Terrill also gave his authors a working definition of the terms he was using: "Horror is what a girl would feel if, from a safe distance, she watched the ghoul practice diabolical rites upon a victim. Terror is what the girl would feel if, on a dark night, she heard the steps of the ghoul coming toward her and knew she was marked for the next victim. Mystery is the girl wondering who done it and why."

Terrill had a novel he wanted to use, but it had been written for the old policy, and Terrill asked the author to cut it down from sixty thousand words in only a few days to be used in the first issue under the new policy. The author complained to Norvell Page, a fast and prolific pulp writer, about Terrill's request, and Page produced a new thirty-five thousand-word novel, Dance of the Skeletons, by the deadline. The plot of Dance of the Skeletons satisfied Terrill's requirements for terror, mystery, and a mundane explanation for mysterious events: Wall Street financiers are disappearing, and their skeletons, stripped of flesh, mysteriously appear on the streets of Manhattan. The explanation is that the villain in the story is killing key businessmen to depress stock prices, and to distract attention from his financial operations he gives the bodies to piranhas. The piranhas reduce the corpses to skeletons, which are secretly left on the city streets. Page later published an article in Writer's Yearbook explaining how he wrote the story and chose the plot elements: "the maximum of terror would be obtained by converting living men into nice white skeletons within a few minutes and concealing the means by which this was done... To have the horror of the story to the full, these skeletons must be flaunted in the face of the city, they must appear at the festive board, thud at the feet of the police commissioner entering headquarters." The lead novel continued to get shorter over the life of the magazine, the shortest novels only running 25 pages (between 15,000 and 18,000 words).

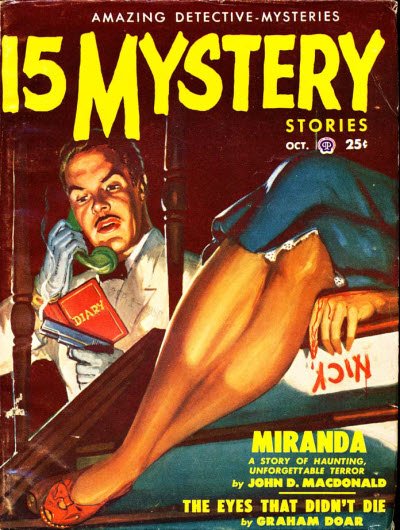
Cover of the last issue, under the title 15 Mystery Stories, October 1950

This was the start of what became known as the "weird menace" genre, and Dime Mystery thus became the first magazine to specialize in horror fiction. An article by Richard Tooker in the writers' magazine Author & Journalist described the requirements of weird menace stories later in the decade: "A fearful menace, apparently due to supernatural agencies, must terrify the characters (and reader, but not the writer) at the start, but the climax must demonstrate convincingly that the menace was natural after all." The stories grew more extreme over time, and the monsters and perils deadlier and more bizarre. Pulp historian Robert Jones quotes a typical description of a monster: "Grey-green was the face, with hollow cheeks and lank, lean jaws. The lips were red with blood as if the teeth they hid had crunched on unmentionable things. But the eyes—dear God, the eyes—were bottomless pits of darkness, from whose stygian depths Death peered and leered." The cover art for the magazine took full advantage of the new policy, with the heroines depicted in every possible kind of danger. Terrill would change the titles of stories he published to suit the weird menace policy, and pulp historian Robert Weinberg comments that, unusually for the pulps, stories with titles such as "The Corpse Factory" and "Our Host, the Madman" were frequently even more bizarre than their titles implied.

Magazine historian Michael Cook singles out three authors as having "[risen] above the purple prose conventions" to produce worthwhile stories for the magazine: John H. Knox, Hugh B. Cave, and Wyatt Blassingame, whom Cook describes as "the most consistently satisfying" weird menace writer. Jones lists "The Corpse-Maker", from the November 1933 issue, as one of Cave's best stories: "A criminal who was horribly disfigured when making his escape from prison ... directs the murder of the jurors who convicted him. They are brought to him to be tortured to death."

Blassingame began selling to the pulps in 1933 and wrote an article for the trade press about how to plot a weird menace story. He listed the two plot devices he used: in the first, the hero is pursued by the villain, and repeatedly fails to escape, finally overcoming the villain when all seems lost; in the second, the hero is trapped and menaced on all sides, and must escape. Jones gives two examples of the way Blassingame would vary these basic plots. In "Three Hours to Live", which appeared in the October 1934 Dime Mystery, the hero's family is cursed, and his relatives die, each death preceded by a mysterious bumping noise. When the curse is about to strike, a friend intervenes to reveal that the curse is actually the hero's uncle, who was killing off other family members to get their money. The second plot device is used in Blassingame's "The Black Pit", from the June 1934 Dime Mystery. The hero visits a deserted house and finds a girl there, and the two are attacked by a dangerous escapee from an asylum, who batters down doors to get at them, and climbs down the chimney when foiled. The hero finally manages to kill the attacker by pushing him into a pit. Blassingame also argued that each story could not be completely impossible: "A single definite fact can be stretched to amazing proportions and will be accepted, but you must make your explanation sound and convincing." This advice was not always followed: Weinberg comments that although the stories always tried to explain away any apparently supernatural events, "the explanations often left major holes in the plot glaringly revealed... But no one seemed to care." The villain was often a madman, though this was usually feigned for plot purposes. Often their plan was to drive the hero or heroine mad, in revenge for a romantic slight or to gain control of their money.

The prohibition on supernatural explanations was not absolute, and a few fantasy stories did appear during the weird menace era. These included a series by Chandler Whipple about a family curse, with stories set in different periods of history. Popular rarely published serials, and this was one of the few times a series of connected stories appeared in the magazine. Paul Ernst also sold a few fantasies to Dime Mystery, including "The Devil's Doorstep" in the October 1935 issue, about a couple who buy a house with a doorway into hell. Some non-fiction material appeared as well, including "History's Gallery of Monsters", a series of ten articles by John Kobler.

In 1937, weird menace magazines began to feature more sexual images and more sadistic villains. Jones cites Bruno Fischer's "Burn—Lovely Lady!" as an example of the genre's "sex-sadistic phase". It appeared in the June 1938 Dime Mystery, and featured a young married couple being tortured. The wife must agree to endure the pain for two hours to win their freedom: needles are inserted in her breast and "other tender parts of her body", and she is stretched on a rack and woken by drugs when she faints. (Note: The story was published under one of Fischer's pseudonyms, Russell Gray.)

During the weird menace period, the stories were a mixture of mystery and horror, but the protagonist was never a detective. In 1937, Strange Detective Mysteries, another Popular title, began running stories featuring unusual detectives, and in October 1938 Dime Mystery's policy changed away from weird menace to "defective detective" fiction: stories with a horror element, about detectives with unusual problems or disabilities. One detective protagonist had hemophilia and had to avoid even the slightest scratch; another was an insomniac when working on a mystery; another was deaf and had to lip-read; another was an amnesiac. There was a brief return to weird menace stories in the early 1940s, but this did not last long. After the July 1941 issue, Dime Mystery printed ordinary detective fiction along with some fantasy, including some early stories by Ray Bradbury.

The covers during the weird menace phase were painted by Walter M. Baumhofer until 1936, with interior art contributed by Amos Sewell. Baumhofer was succeeded by Tom Lovell for 1936 and much of 1937, and Sewell by Paul Orban, David Berger, and Ralph Carlson.

== Bibliographic details ==
Issue data for Dime Mystery Magazine
	Jan	Feb	Mar	Apr	May	Jun	Jul	Aug	Sep	Oct	Nov	Dec
1932												1/1
1933	1/2	1/3	1/4	2/1	2/2	2/3	2/4	3/1	3/2	3/3	3/4	4/1
1934	4/2	4/3	4/4	5/1	5/2	5/3	5/4	6/1	6/2	6/3	6/4	7/1
1935	7/2	7/3	7/4	8/1	8/2	8/3	8/4	9/1	9/2	9/3	9/4	10/1
1935	10/2	10/3	10/4	11/1	11/2	11/3	11/4	12/1	12/2	12/3	12/4	13/1
1937	13/2	13/3	13/4	14/1	14/2	14/3	14/4	15/1	15/2	15/3	15/4	16/1
1938	16/2	16/3	16/4	17/1	17/2	17/3	17/4	18/1	18/2	18/3	18/4	19/1
1939	19/2	19/3	19/4	20/1	20/2	20/3	20/4	21/1	21/2	21/3	21/4	22/1
1940	22/2	22/3	22/4	23/1	23/2		23/3	23/4	24/1	24/2	24/3	24/4
1941	25/1	25/2	25/3		25/4		26/1		26/2		26/3	
1942	26/4		27/1		27/2		27/3		27/4		28/1	
1943	28/3		28/3		28/4		29/1		29/2		29/3	
1944	29/4		30/1		30/2		30/3		30/4		31/1	
1945	31/2		31/3		31/4		32/1		322/2		32/3	
1946	32/4	33/1			33/2		33/3		33/4		34/1	
1947	34/2		34/3		34/4		35/1		35/2	35/3	35/4	36/1
1948	36/2	36/3		36/4		37/1		37/2		37/3		37/4
1949		38/1		38/2		38/3		38/4		39/1		39/2
1950		39/3		39/4		40/1		40/2		40/3		
Issues of Dime Mystery Magazine, showing volume and issue number. The sequence of editors is not well-documented.

Dime Mystery Magazine was published by Popular Publications, and produced 159 issues between December 1932 and October 1950. It was pulp format for all issues, with a page count between 128 and 144 pages. The price began at 10 cents, increased to 15 cents in November 1944, to 20 cents in December 1948, and finally to 25 cents in February 1950. It was originally titled Dime Mystery Book Magazine, changing to Dime Mystery Magazine in July 1933. It stayed under that title until 1950 when it changed to 15 Mystery Stories for its last five issues. The volume numbering was regular, with each volume having four issues; the final issue was volume 40, number 3. It began as a monthly magazine, and stayed on that schedule till March 1941, omitting only the June 1940 issue. From March 1941 to September 1947 it was bimonthly, except that in 1946 a February issue appeared instead of a March issue. A brief monthly sequence ran from September 1947 until February 1948, followed by another bimonthly sequence that lasted to the end of the run.

The sequence of editors is not well-documented. Pulp historian Robert Kenneth Jones lists Rogers Terrill as the first editor, with the editorship passing to Chandler Whipple in about 1941, and to Loring Dowst in about 1943. He also lists Henry Sperry as an editor, with Leon Byrne as associate editor; he does not give dates, but notes that both Sperry and Byrne died in 1939. Bibliographer Phil Stephensen-Payne gives the sequence of editors as Rogers Terrill, Henry Sperry, Leon Byrne, Chandler Whipple, and Loring Dowst, but gives no dates for the transitions. Weinberg lists Terrill as the editor of all the weird menace issues, from October 1933 to September 1938, and describes Sperry and Dowst as associate editors. An article in Writer's Digest in December 1942 about publishing staff who had left to serve in the military listed John Bender as the editor of Dime Mystery.

Dime Mystery is collectible, with issues selling for $100 or more as of 2007 depending on condition. Its companion titles, Horror Stories and Terror Tales, usually command higher prices.

== Sources ==
- Ashley, Mike (1985a). "Dime Mystery Magazine". In Tymn, Marshall B.; Ashley, Mike (eds.). Science Fiction, Fantasy and Weird Fiction Magazines. Westport, Connecticut: Greenwood Press. pp. 180–183. ISBN 0-3132-1221-X.
- Ashley, Mike (1985b). "Horror Stories (1935–1941)". In Tymn, Marshall B.; Ashley, Mike (eds.). Science Fiction, Fantasy and Weird Fiction Magazines. Westport, Connecticut: Greenwood Press. pp. 326–328. ISBN 0-3132-1221-X.
- Ashley, Mike (1985c). "Terror Tales". In Tymn, Marshall B.; Ashley, Mike (eds.). Science Fiction, Fantasy and Weird Fiction Magazines. Westport, Connecticut: Greenwood Press. pp. 660–661. ISBN 0-3132-1221-X.
- Ashley, Mike (1985d). "Thrilling Mystery". In Tymn, Marshall B.; Ashley, Mike (eds.). Science Fiction, Fantasy and Weird Fiction Magazines. Westport, Connecticut: Greenwood Press. pp. 666–667. ISBN 0-3132-1221-X.
- Goulart, Ron (1988). The Dime Detectives. New York: Mysterious Press. ISBN 0892961910.
- Hardin, Nils (July 1977). "An Interview with Henry Steeger". Xenophile (33): 3–18.
- Hulse, Ed (2013). The Blood'n'Thunder Guide to Pulp Fiction. Morris Plains, New Jersey: Murania Press. ISBN 978-1491010938.
- Jones, Robert Kenneth (1975). The Shudder Pulps. West Linn, Oregon: FAX Collector's Editions. ISBN 0913960047.
- Jones, Robert Kenneth (1983). "Dime Mystery Book". In Cook, Michael L. (ed.). Mystery, Detective, and Espionage Magazines. Westport, Connecticut: Greenwood Press. pp. 170–173. ISBN 0313233101.
- Locke, John (2020). Pulp Fictioneers: Adventures in the Storytelling Business. Silver Spring, Maryland: Adventure House. ISBN 978-1440862069.
- Nevins, Jess (2020). Horror Fiction in the 20th Century: Exploring Literature's Most Chilling Genre. Santa Barbara, California: ABC-CLIO. ISBN 978-1440862069.
- Robinson, Frank; Davidson, Lawrence (2007). Pulp Culture. Portland, Oregon: Collectors Press. ISBN 978-1933112305.
- Sampson, Robert (1987). Yesterday's Faces Volume 4: The Solvers. Bowling Green, Ohio: Bowling Green State University Popular Press. ISBN 0879724153.
- Weinberg, Robert (1981). "The Horror Pulps: 1933–1940". In Tymn, Marshall B. (ed.). Horror Literature: A Core Collection and Reference Guide. New York: R.R. Bowker Company. pp. 370–397. ISBN 0835213412.
