= Wyatt Rainey Blassingame =

American novelist (1909–1985)

- Born: February 6, 1909; Demopolis, Alabama, U.S.
- Died: January 9, 1985 (aged 75); Bradenton, Florida, U.S.
- Other name: W.B. Rainey
- Occupation: Writer
- Spouse: Gertrude Olsen (m. 1936)
- Children: 2

Wyatt Rainey Blassingame (February 6, 1909 – January 9, 1985), also known as W. B. Rainey, was an American writer and the author of many short stories and articles for national magazines, four adult novels and dozens of juvenile nonfiction books. After graduating from the University of Alabama he served as a Navy lieutenant during World War II.

== Early years ==
Blassingame was born in Demopolis, Alabama, on February 6, 1909, to Wyatt Childs Blassingame and Maude (Lurton) Blassingame. He was educated at Howard College, now Samford University, in Birmingham, Alabama, the University of Alabama, and New York University, graduating in 1952. He served in the United States Navy during World War II and received a Bronze Star and a Presidential Unit Citation. After moving to Anna Maria, Florida, he taught at Manatee Junior College and Florida Southern College.

== Career ==
In the 1930s, Blassingame wrote for the "Weird menace" horror pulps such as Terror Tales and Dime Mystery.

His short stories have recently been republished in three collections edited by John Pelan, published by Dancing Tuatara Press. Four of his juvenile nonfiction books were written for the Landmark book series: The French Foreign Legion, The U.S. Frogmen of World War II, Combat Nurses of World War II, and Medical Corps Heroes of World War II. He made every effort to make his books as accurate as possible, and disapproved of fictionalizing juvenile history merely for the benefit of drama. Many of his books were chosen as Junior Book-of-the-Month selections, Junior Literary Guild selections and other honors.

== Death ==
Blassingame died in Bradenton, Florida, in 1985, aged 75. His papers are housed at the University of Southern Mississippi in Hattiesburg and the University of South Florida.

== Family ==
He married Gertrude Olsen in 1936; they had two daughters, Peggy and April.
