= Dr. Yen Sin =

Short-lived pulp science fiction magazine

- Cover of Pulp Classics #9 (1975), containing a facsimile reprint of the first issue of Dr. Yen Sin

Publication information
- Publisher: Popular Publications
- First appearance: Dr. Yen Sin
- Created by: Donald E. Keyhoe

Dr. Yen Sin was a short-lived pulp science fiction magazine published by the New York City-based Popular Publications during 1936. It superseded a similar magazine from the same publishers entitled The Mysterious Wu Fang, which had ceased publication in February 1936. The title characters of both magazines, Wu Fang and Yen Sin, were Yellow Peril villains in the mold of Fu Manchu.

Only three issues of Dr. Yen Sin appeared, with cover dates May/June 1936, July/August 1936 and September/October 1936. Each issue contained a lead novel, written by Donald E. Keyhoe (who later became famous as the author of The Flying Saucers Are Real), together with additional material. The titles of the three novels, in chronological order of publication, are as follows:

- The Mystery of the Dragon's Shadow
- The Mystery of the Golden Skull
- The Mystery of the Singing Mummies

The first novel was reprinted in Robert Weinberg's Pulp Classics #9 (1975), while the second and third novels were reprinted in High Adventure issues 32 (1997) and 39 (1998) respectively.

The novels are set in a dark, fog-shrounded version of Washington, D.C. resembling the Limehouse of Sax Rohmer's Fu Manchu books. Yen Sin, described as the "Yellow Doctor" and the "Invisible Emperor", combines the mysticism of the East with the latest devices of the West with diabolical results. He uses blow guns, Dacoit stranglers, death rays and science laboratories to achieve his evil ends. He is opposed by Michael Traile, a man who is incapable of natural sleep (owing to a bungled brain operation) and who has to resort to periodic yoga-like relaxation sessions in order to recharge his vitality.

== See also ==
- List of defunct American periodicals
