= Robert J. Hogan (writer) =

American writer (1897–1963)

Robert Jasper Hogan (1897–1963) was an American writer, mainly of pulp fiction and later western fiction. He is notable as the creator of G-8, published by Popular Publications. Unlike other pulp authors, all his works appeared under his own name rather than house pseudonyms.

== Life and writing ==
Robert Jasper Hogan was born in Buskirk, New York on 4 June 1897. The son of a Dutch Reformed Minister, the family name was changed from Van Hoogen. His education began in Schenectady and led through Blair Academy prep school in New Jersey to graduation from St. Lawrence University. His first job after graduating was riding range for several ranches on the west slope of the Rockies. After that he tried amateur boxing and playing piano for silent movies and hoedown dances. In the summer of 1917, he and a friend trekked west to Colorado for some cow-punching and ranch life. The name of that ranch was the G-8.

Before he became a writer he also had built houses, manufactured leather goods and designed planes. While in Denver, Hogan was photographed in the newspaper as being the first man in the area to take the new Air Service examination. After enlistment in January 1918, he took ground school at Cornell and was sent to Eberts Field, near the small town of Lonoke, Arkansas, for flight training. He later taught flying.

Discharged after the Armistice, Hogan took post graduate work at Harvard and eventually reentered aviation. The late 1920s found him a sales manager and airplane demonstrator for the Curtiss-Wright Corp. in Syracuse. Operations manager of that branch office was Harold O. Nevin. While an Air Service squadron commander in France, Nevin had done some intelligence work due to a facility in French acquired during boyhood near the Canada–US border. He had picked up the sobriquet “Bull” for his football fame at Syracuse.

Nevin was also a good story-teller and often enthralled the imaginative Hogan with tales of his wartime adventures. When visiting Nevin's home, Hogan and his wife were both impressed by a photograph on the wall showing three American officers striding abreast along a Paris boulevard. With their Sam Browne belts, boots and swagger sticks, there was an essence of brotherhood and elan that was inspiring, despite the casual agent of war. One of the three was Bull Nevin; and another was named “Nippy” Westover — prototypes of the soon-to-be-created “Bull” Martin and “Nippy” Weston.

Airplane salesmen were expendable after the 1929 collapse, and Hogan soon found himself placed upon his mettle. To fill a leisure moment, he read one of the new aviation pulp magazines. Afterwards, he is reported to have said, “Hell, I can write better than that!” and a short while later he sold his first story to WINGS for $65.00.

Moving from Florida to Manhattan, to be near the pulp markets, he found a jungle of competition. Nearly 300 writers lived around New York and an estimated 1000 others mailed in manuscripts from around the world. Hogan's main effort was among the half-dozen air story magazines, although he did write sport and western stories to broaden his earning stance. Noting the quality of Popular Publications air magazines, he was determined to become one of their regular writers. In 1932 he succeeded with Smoke Wade, mostly printed in Battle Birds from 1932 to 1934.

And so in mid-1933, as he contemplated the proposal to do a book length series, he was quite pleased with his progress in three years. Discussions with Henry Steeger jelled, and a name was sought for the new issue. Reaching back to his ranching days, Hogan suggested “G-8″, principally because “G” had a government and intelligence connotation. Steeger liked that but added “…and his Battle Aces,” the idea being to drop BATTLE ACES, Popular's first air magazine, and get some carryover identification in the name of its successor....G-8 AND HIS BATTLE ACES.

Bob Hogan's story formula was for a secret diary of never-before-revealed wartime adventures to be opened to him by a former master spy. There would be an intimacy with high command that hinted at real events, but with the admission that literary license would be freely practiced. Hogan also determined to avoid similarity and dullness with a healthy injection of fantasy.

Using this basic structure, 110 issues were fleshed out with amazing variation in detail for the situational limitations of World War I. The first story, “The Bat Staffel” appeared in September, 1933. Print orders eventually peaked at about 200,000 and things went very well until early 1936 when the price per issue was reduced from 15¢ to 10¢ in an effort to hold circulation. Five years later, the April 1941 issue was the last of the monthly series; thereafter it appeared every two months. The end came with the June 1944 number. The old readership was having their own War; and for the younger, the excitement of daily realities overpowered the antiquity of Spads and Fokkers.

Post-pulp work included several full length western novels, Howl at the Moon, and work adapted for television. He wrote four full length pulp stories about The Secret 6 between 1934 and 1935, which were not aviation or western based, and 9 uncredited short stories between 1935 and 1937 and one under the alias Greaseball Joe.

He wrote many of his pulp stories while living in a small private house in New Jersey with his wife and daughter. Nick Carr in his book described him as: "Bob Hogan was tall, thin, blond, very outgoing and a voracious worker." He died 17 December 1963 in Florida.

== Bibliography ==
- "Red Falcon" (pulp series from Popular Publications in Daredevil Aces, reprinted by Age of Aces)
- "Smoke Wade" (pulp series from Popular Publications, reprinted by Age of Aces)
- G-8 and His Battle Aces (110 issue pulp from Popular Publications, reprinted by Adventure House and Berkeley Medallion)
- The Mysterious Wu Fang (7 issue pulp from Popular Publications)
- Secret Six (4 issue pulp from Popular Publications, reprinted by Altus Press)
- G-8 and his Battles Aces, Bombs From the Murder Wolves Berkeley Medallion Book
- G-8 and his Battle Aces, Vulures of the White Death Berkeley Medallion Books
