= The Western Raider =

American pulp magazine

The Western Raider was an American pulp magazine. The first issue was dated August/September 1938; it was followed by two more issues under that title, publishing Western fiction, and then was changed to a crime fiction pulp for two issues, titled The Octopus and The Scorpion. Both these two issues were named after a supervillain, rather than after a hero who fights crime, as was the case with most such magazines. Norvell Page wrote the lead novels for both the crime fiction issues; the second was rewritten by Ejler Jakobsson, one of the editors, to change the character from The Octopus to The Scorpion.

== Bibliographic details ==
The Western Raider was published by Popular Publications. There were a total of five issues; three under the title The Western Raider, one as The Octopus, and one as The Scorpion. There was one volume of four numbers; with the final issue the numbering was restarted at volume 1 number 1. It was in pulp format, with 128 pages, priced at 15 cents for the three Western issues; the last two issues were 112 pages and 10 cents. The schedule was bimonthly, starting with August/September 1938 and ending with April/May 1939. The co-editors for the two crime fiction issues were Ejler Jakobsson and Edith Jakobsson.

== Sources ==
- Sampson, Robert (1983). "The Octopus". In Cook, Michael L. (ed.). Mystery, Detective, and Espionage Magazines. Westport, Connecticut: Greenwood Press. pp. 391–394. ISBN 0-313-23310-1.
- Weinberg, Robert (1985a). "The Octopus". In Tymn, Marshall B.; Ashley, Mike (eds.). Science Fiction, Fantasy and Weird Fiction Magazines. Westport, Connecticut: Greenwood Press. pp. 440–441. ISBN 0-3132-1221-X.
- Weinberg, Robert (1985b). "The Scorpion". In Tymn, Marshall B.; Ashley, Mike (eds.). Science Fiction, Fantasy and Weird Fiction Magazines. Westport, Connecticut: Greenwood Press. pp. 565–566. ISBN 0-3132-1221-X.
