= Exploitation fiction =

Novels and magazines that exploit sex, violence, drugs, or other prurient elements

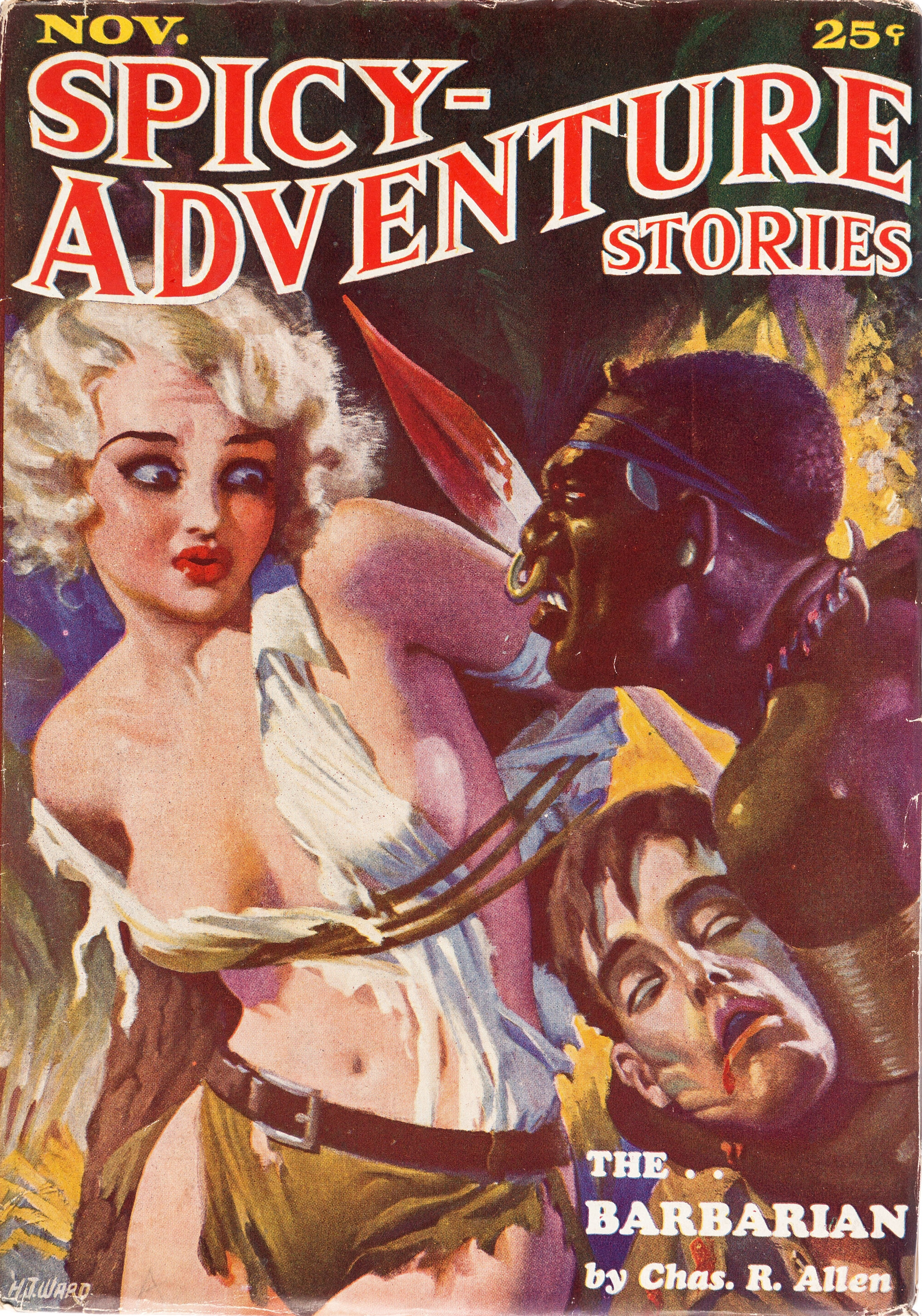
Spicy-Adventure Stories was an exploitative fiction magazine published in the 1930s and 1940s.

Exploitation fiction is a type of literature that includes novels and magazines that exploit sex, violence, drugs, or other elements meant to attract readers primarily by arousing prurient interest without being labeled as obscene or pornographic.

== History ==
Exploitation fiction grew out of pulp fiction of the 1930s and 1940s. It was popular "trash fiction" in the form of mass market paperbacks in the 1950s and 1960s, when genuine, sexually explicit material could be seized as obscene. In the United States, material that went by U.S. mail was subject to federal obscenity laws that greatly curtailed the distribution of materials that were sexually explicit or featured graphic violence. These cheap novels exploited violence, drugs, and sex—especially promiscuity and lesbianism—but rarely delivered the kind of salacious detail their cover art implied and generally tacked on moralistic endings to satisfy critics who accused them of having "no redeeming social value." They were often repackaged under new titles with different cover art, to resell to the unsuspecting public looking for cheap thrills.

As film production codes loosened in the early 1960s, exploitation fiction led to exploitation cinema (parallel to the development of Italian giallo cinema), typified by Russ Meyer films.

== See also ==
- Bizarro fiction
- Exploitation film
- Giallo
- Pulp fiction
- Transgressive art
- Weird menace
