= Harry Steeger =

American publisher (1903–1990)

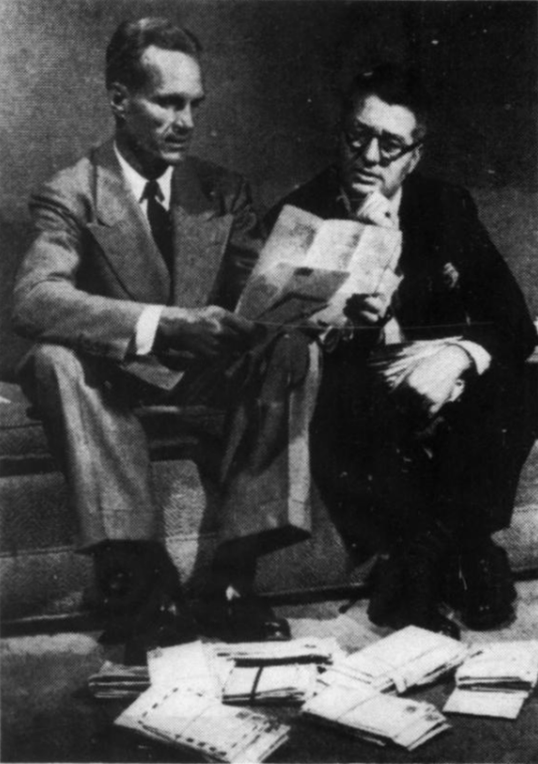
Harry Steeger (left) with Jerry Mason, the editor of Argosy, in 1949

Henry Steeger III (May 26, 1903 – December 25, 1990) was an American magazine editor and publisher.

== Career ==
Steeger co-founded Popular Publications in 1930, one of the major publishers of pulp magazines, with former classmate Harold S. Goldsmith. Steeger handled editorial matters while Goldsmith took care of the business side. Both were veterans of the pulp magazine business. Steeger had edited war pulps at Dell Publishing while Goldsmith had served as an editor at A. A. Wyn's Magazine Publishers.

Steeger's new firm launched four titles which debuted on the newsstands with cover dates of October 1930. Battle Aces was devoted to aviation war stories and enjoyed a two-year run before changing titles. Detective Action Stories, one of Popular Publications' most successful titles, enjoyed a run of seven years. The first issue featured an Erle Stanley Gardner story: "The Key to Room 537." Gang World, a crime fiction magazine featuring characters "in conflict with each other and the law" ran from 1930 through 1935. The fourth title, for the lucrative western market, was titled Western Rangers. It was the shortest-lived of the original line-up, lasting for nineteen issues through April, 1932. The lead story of the first issue was "The Red Ranger," by J. Allan Dunn, "featuring a Texas ranger who runs up against a bunch of Mexican smugglers and eventually saves the captured American girl from their clutches."

With Horror Stories and Terror Tales, Steeger started the "shudder pulp" (or "weird menace") genre. Although short lived, this genre was responsible for some of the most striking cover art of the Pulp Era. The over-the-top stories of torture and titillation however, led the public to look down on the fiction found in the pulp magazines.

Steeger created the long-running pulp character The Spider and published it as a Popular Publications pulp magazine from 1933 to 1943. The series was published monthly and ran for 118 issues. (A 119th issue was published years later.) Steeger also edited (anonymously) the last issues of Black Mask.

He died on Christmas Day, 1990 at age 87.
