= The Mysterious Wu Fang =

American pulp magazine

Cover of the first issue; artwork is by Jerome Rozen

The Mysterious Wu Fang was a pulp magazine which published seven issues in 1935 and 1936. Sax Rohmer's Fu Manchu, an oriental villain, was a "yellow peril" stereotype, and Popular Publications wanted to take advantage of the public's interest. The author of all seven lead novels was Robert J. Hogan, who was simultaneously writing the novels for G-8 and His Battle Aces, producing 130,000 to 150,000 words per month; Hogan was told not to rewrite, but to deliver his first drafts. The hero of the novels was a man named Val Kildare; other characters included a young assistant to Kildare, who was probably added to attract younger readers. The artist John Richard Flanagan, who had experience illustrating Fu Manchu, was hired, but in the opinion of pulp historian Robert Weinberg, "an imitation was an imitation, and the magazine did not sell well". There were short stories along with the lead novel in each issue, also with a "yellow peril" theme; the authors included Steve Fisher, Frank Gruber, O.B. Meyers, and Frank Beaston. The magazine was cancelled after seven issues in favor of a similar magazine with a different villain: Dr. Yen Sin. According to pulp historian Joseph Lewandowski, the decision to switch titles may have been because Wu Fang was too juvenile, and Dr. Yen Sin was supposed to be more mature.

== Bibliographic details ==
The publisher was Popular Publications, who were based in Chicago with editorial offices in New York. The magazine was monthly, running from September 1935 to March 1936, with one volume of four numbers and a second of three numbers. The price was 10 cents throughout the run; issues varied from 112 to 128 pages. The editor was Edith Seims. Unpublished in the magazine was an eighth novel, V2#4, advertised for April 1936, "The Case of the Living Poison."

== Sources ==
- Weinberg, Robert (1985). "The Mysterious Wu Fang". In Tymn, Marshall B.; Ashley, Mike (eds.). Science Fiction, Fantasy and Weird Fiction Magazines. Westport, Connecticut: Greenwood Press. pp. 414–416. ISBN 0-3132-1221-X.
- Lewandowski, Joseph (1983). "The Mysterious Wu Fang". In Cook, Michael L. (ed.). Mystery, Detective, and Espionage Magazines. Westport, Connecticut: Greenwood Press. pp. 341–343. ISBN 0-313-23310-1.
