= Horror Stories (magazine) =

American pulp magazine

Magazine cover

Horror Stories was an American pulp magazine that published tales of the supernatural, horror, and macabre.

== Publications ==
The first issue was published in January 1935, three years after the weird menace genre had begun with Dime Mystery Magazine. Horror Stories was a sister magazine to Terror Tales, whose first issue came out a year earlier. The title went on to become one of the major pulp magazines of the 1930s.

Horror Stories was published by Popular Publications, founded by Harry Steeger and Harold Goldsmith. The magazine was issued with luridly illustrated covers featuring the theme of the damsel in distress, mostly executed by artist John Newton Howitt (1885-1958). Only one original cover painting has survived.

Horror Stories ceased publication in 1941, because of the paper shortage after the United States entered World War II which also affected other pulp publications.

== Legacy ==
Due to the nature of its content and its relatively short run of 47 issues, Horror Stories is now one of the most sought-after collectible pulp titles. In 2005, Black Mask published a facsimile of issue 1.

Magazines of this sort set a benchmark in macabre storytelling that inspired many of the U.S. horror comics from their appearance in 1947.

== See also ==
- Science fiction magazine
- Fantasy fiction magazine
- Horror fiction magazine
