= Weird menace =

Subgenre of horror and detective fiction

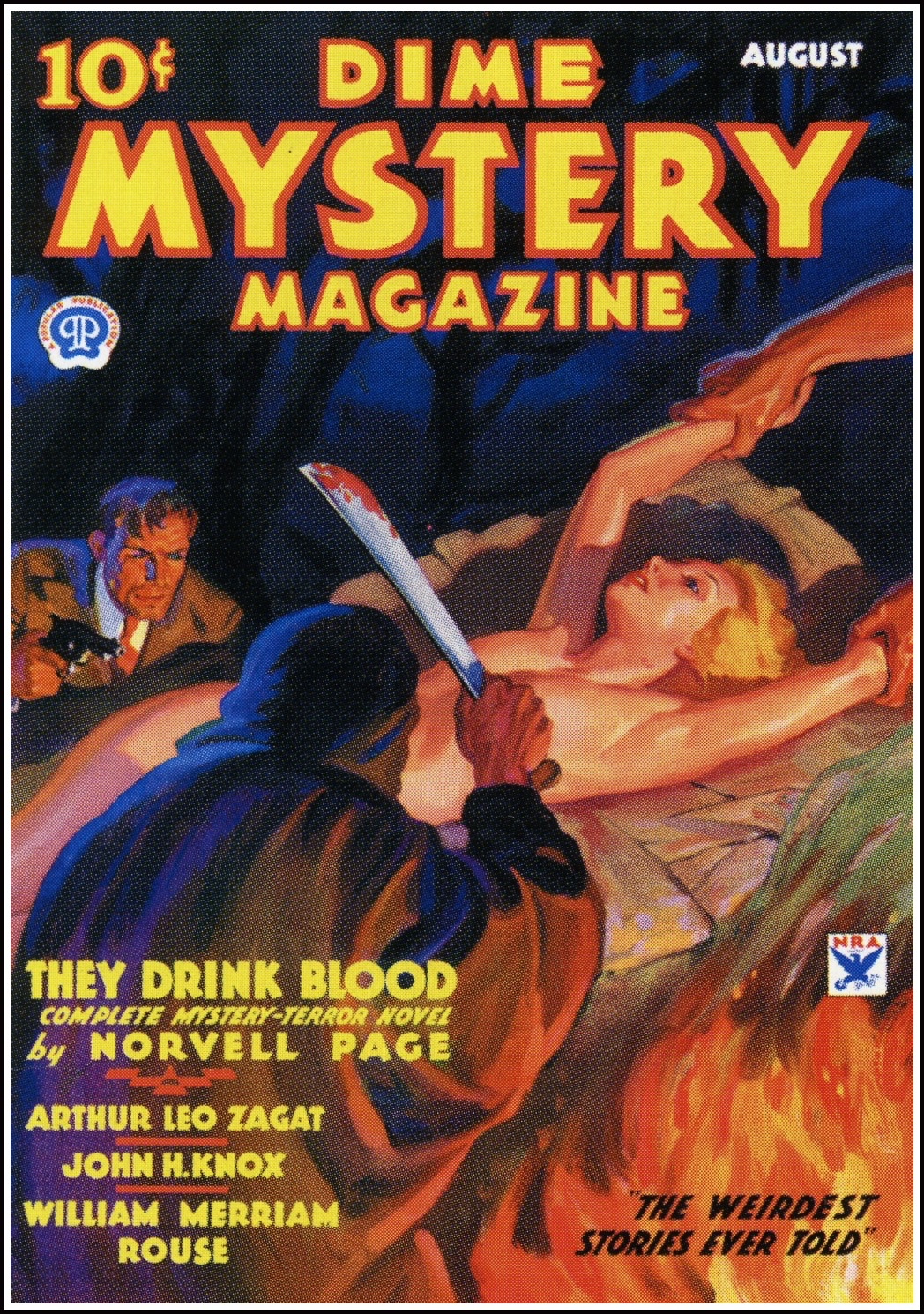
Cover of the August 1934 issue of Dime Mystery Magazine

Weird menace is a subgenre of horror fiction and detective fiction that was popular in the pulp magazines of the 1930s and early 1940s. The weird menace pulps, also known as shudder pulps, generally featured stories in which the hero was pitted against sadistic villains, with graphic scenes of torture and brutality.

== Background ==
In the early 1930s, detective pulps like Detective-Dragnet, All Detective, Dime Detective, and the short-lived Strange Detective Stories, began to favor detective stories with weird, eerie, or menacing elements. Eventually, the two distinct genre variations branched into separate magazines; the detective magazines returned to stories predominantly featuring detection or action, while the eerie mysteries found their own home in the weird menace titles. Some magazines, for instance Ten Detective Aces (the successor to Detective-Dragnet), continued to host both genre variations.

== Popularity and demise ==
The first weird menace title was Dime Mystery Magazine, which started out as a straight crime fiction magazine but began to develop the new genre in 1933 under the influence of Grand Guignol theater. Popular Publications dominated the genre with Dime Mystery, Terror Tales, and Horror Stories. After Popular issued Thrilling Mysteries, Standard Magazines, publisher of the "Thrilling" line of pulps, claimed trademark infringement. Popular withdrew Thrilling Mysteries after one issue, and Standard issued their own weird menace pulp, Thrilling Mystery. In the 1930s, the Red Circle pulps, with Mystery Tales, expanded the genre to include increasingly graphic descriptions of torture.

This provoked a public outcry against such publications. For example, The American Mercury published a hostile account of the terror magazines in 1938, "This month, as every month, the 1,508,000 copies of terror magazines, known to the trade as the shudder group, will be sold throughout the nation... They will contain enough illustrated sex perversion to give Krafft-Ebing the unholy jitters."

In 1938, a group of Catholic bishops founded the National Organization for Decent Literature (NODL). In addition to their own efforts, the NODL encouraged citizens to pressure publishers and newsstand operators to remove magazines deemed offensive. The biggest targets were the horror and “spicy” magazines.

In June 1940, when the NODL insisted that Popular Publications address their five weird menace pulps—Dime Mystery Magazine, Horror Stories, Terror Tales, Sinister Stories, and Startling Mystery Magazine—Popular reacted immediately. The latter two titles were canceled while the other three were toned down. In 1941, Horror and Terror were canceled, as well, while Dime Mystery became a straight crime-fiction magazine.

In early 1940, Red Circle canceled Mystery Tales. In 1941, Standard announced that Thrilling Mystery had changed policy from a “horror-terror book” to a “straight detective magazine.”

The “Spicy” titles from Culture Publications resisted NODL pressure, presumably because they could profit from selling only 30% of their print run, making them less vulnerable to boycott threats. In January 1943, however, they rebranded their Spicy titles to Speed. With Spicy Mystery becoming Speed Mystery, and the announcement that the Speed magazines would have “almost no girl interest . . . from now on,” the weird menace genre had ended for good.

== See also ==
- Exploitation fiction
- Marvel Science Stories
