= Aviation in World War II =

Use of aircraft during the Second World War

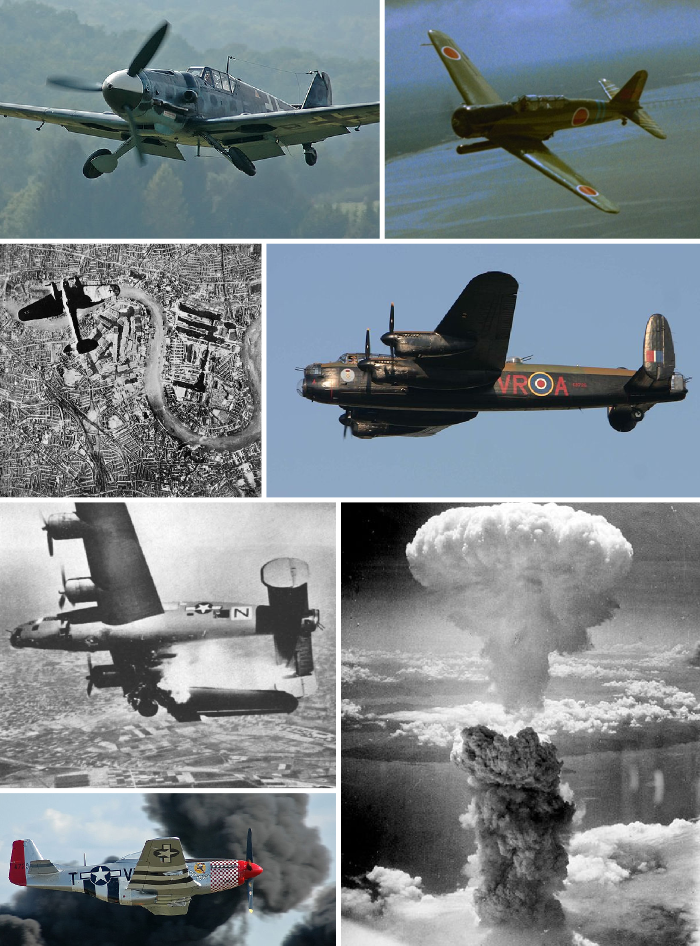
Clockwise from top: a Messerschmitt Bf 109; a Nakajima B5N; an Avro Lancaster; the Nagasaki atomic bomb; a North American P-51 Mustang; a Consolidated B-24 Liberator; a Heinkel He 111.

During World War II, aviation firmly established itself as a critical component of modern warfare from the Battle of Britain in the early stages to the great aircraft carrier battles between American and Japanese Pacific fleets and the final delivery of nuclear weapons. The major belligerents, Germany and Japan on one side and Britain, the United States and the USSR on the other, manufactured huge air forces which engaged in pitched battles both with each other and with the opposing ground forces. Bombing established itself as a major strategic force, and this was also the first war in which the aircraft carrier played a significant role.

As with Aviation in World War I, military investment during World War II drove aviation forward in leaps and bounds. The streamlined cantilever monoplane quickly proved its worth in almost every role, although a few older biplanes remained in niche roles for much of the war. Engine power and aircraft performance increased steadily, with jet and rocket engines beginning to make their appearance by the end of the war. Power-assisted flight control systems increased in sophistication and became more widespread, as did avionics systems including blind flying instrumentation, radio communications and radar tracking.

The development of civil aviation stagnated until peace could be restored, and in the combatant countries many existing civilian aircraft were pressed into military service. However military technologies developed during the war would revolutionise postwar aviation. In particular, the widespread construction of aerodromes with serviceable runways would provide the basis for a postwar move of long-range passenger flights from flying boats to land planes.

== Aircraft ==
=== Airframes ===
The streamlined cantilever monoplane (an airplane with one pair of wings) quickly proved its worth in almost every role, although a few older biplanes and other obsolescent types remained in niche roles for much of the war. Key design features during this period included:

- Stressed-skin semi-monocoque construction, typically of aluminium light alloy but sometimes of wooden or mixed construction.
- A clean, unbraced cantilever monoplane wing.
- Conventional tail or empennage, with bombers often adopting twin tail fins, believed to improve stability during the bombing run.
- Retracting landing gear of conventional configuration with a tailwheel or tailskid.
- Landing flaps.
- Variable-pitch propellers in tractor configuration.
- Fully enclosed cockpit.

The retracting undercarriage gave landplanes a significant performance advantage over the equivalent seaplane, whose floats caused additional drag. In other respects, the evolution of seaplane design paralleled landplane developments. Seaplanes, typically flying boats, remained in use for long-range maritime operations. Smaller craft, typically floatplanes, remained in other niche areas such as mountain lakes where a runway was not feasible.

Experiments on other configurations continued throughout the war, especially in Germany.

A small number of twin tailboom types entered production, and some slower types designed for roles such as Army observation retained the older fixed undercarriage.

Towards the end of the war the first jet aircraft entered service; the Arado Ar 234 reconnaissance bomber, Messerschmitt Me 262 Schwalbe (Swallow) fighter and Gloster Meteor fighter. The Messerschmitt Me 163 Komet (Comet) interceptor was both rocket powered and of tailless configuration. Both of the Messerschmitt types had swept wings to delay the onset of small shock waves and the accompanying drag at transonic speeds. Other German types delivered to front-line units in the last days of the war included the rocket-powered vertical-takeoff Bachem Ba 349 Natter (Adder) interceptor — the very first manned, rocket-powered aircraft to launch vertically as designed — and the jet-powered Heinkel He 162 Spatz (sparrow) light fighter.

Other variations were flown but never entered production, sometimes independently by different countries. These included the canard or tail-first configuration in combination with a pusher propeller, the flying wing, the slip-wing which took off as a biplane and then discarded the upper wing, and twin centrally mounted engines in push-pull configuration with a tractor installation at the front and a pusher installation in the rear.

==== Gliders ====
Military gliders such as the British Airspeed Horsa and specialised tugs such as the German Heinkel He 111Z were developed by a number of countries during World War II, for landing assault troops and equipment behind enemy lines. These gliders were characterised by a steep gliding angle and short landing run, allowing a short time in the air and precision landing. However they were highly vulnerable and their dependence on surprise severely limited their success. The British used them extensively in the battle of Arnhem and suffered huge losses.

==== Rotorcraft ====
Rotorcraft had been produced before the war in the form of the autogyro and many, such as the Avro Rota, a license-built Cierva design, continued in use throughout the war.

The Focke-Achgelis Fa 330 Bachstelze (Wagtail) unpowered rotor kite was towed behind submarines for use as an observation platform.

In 1942 the Flettner Fl 282 Kolibri (Hummingbird) observation platform became the first true helicopter with a power-driven rotor to enter production. Two years later it was followed in Germany by the twin-rotor Focke Achgelis Fa 223 Drache (Kite) transport helicopter and in America by the Sikorsky R-4. The R-4 was far the most-produced type and was introduced into RAF service as the Hoverfly I, where it was progressively replacing the Avro Rota autogyro by the end of hostilities.

=== Engines ===
Engine power and aircraft performance increased steadily throughout the war, with liquid-cooled inline and vee engines competing with air-cooled radials much as they had competed with air-cooled rotary types in the First War. As an example, at the start of the war the Rolls-Royce Merlin III liquid-cooled V-12 engine developed just 1,000 hp while at the end its derivative the Rolls-Royce Griffon 61 offered 2,035 hp.

In the early stages of the war German fighters, especially the Messerschmitt Bf 109, were very fast and maneuverable and had the advantage over the British types of a fuel-injected engine. This allowed them to fly upside-down or to perform other negative-G manoeuvres without fear of the engine cutting out, as happened to the British types fitted with carburetors. On the other hand, the carburetor combined with a turbocharger gave better performance at altitude. However, as the war wore on, Germany's critical inability to produce piston aviation engines of at least 1,500 kW (2,000 PS) maximum power and above that possessed proven front-line reliability, prevented them from fully developing more advanced strategic and tactical combat aircraft designs that would require such powerplants.

Meanwhile, jet and rocket engines had been under steady development, the rocket especially in Germany and the jet both there and in Britain. By the end of the war they were beginning to make their appearance in operational types. The German and British jet technologies differed significantly. The axial-flow jet, in which air passes continuously backwards through the engine, was recognized as the most efficient design but required highly advanced new technologies in both materials and precision manufacture. While the Germans opted for this approach, the British chose the simpler and more robust centrifugal compressor in which the air is first flung outwards, using centrifugal force to help compress it, before being burned and returned to the axial-flow turbine stage. This resulted in a shorter but wider engine for the same airflow and output power. The Hungarian Jendrassik Cs-1, in 1940 the world's first turboprop, was of axial-flow design with similarly reversed-flow combustion but was cancelled due to other priorities. The pulse jet was a crude jet engine which produced too much vibration to be usable for manned aircraft but found a niche in the V-1 flying bomb.

=== Armament ===
At the start of the war, the British Hawker Hurricane and Supermarine Spitfire fighters had eight machine guns against typically four on the Messerschmitt Bf 109, giving them far greater firepower. The early marks of Spitfire and Hurricane had machine guns that were, however, of the .30 calibre (7.62mm) class, with less hitting power than heavier calibre weapons firing non-explosive bullets - the Germans' MG 131 machine gun, the Japanese Ho-103 machine gun, the Soviets' Berezin UB and particularly the "light-barrel" AN/M2 version of the American Browning M2 machine gun, all of the .50 calibre (12.7mm) size, became very widely used as primary offensive and defensive aircraft armament by the end of World War II.

The Bf 109 could also be fitted with a cannon, and later variants with up to three. These guns have exploding shells instead of solid bullets but are larger and heavier than ordinary machine guns. Opinions differed on both sides as to which type was better. Some aircraft were made in both variants, while others could be modified in the field to fit either or both types. As the war progressed, higher aircraft speeds, cockpit armour and stronger airframes led to a steadily increasing preference for cannon.

Later in the war the British and American forces made extensive use of unguided rockets for ground attack, while the German Bachem Natter point-defence interceptor had a battery of rockets in the nose intended to be fired into an oncoming bomber formation.

=== Avionics ===
Avionics systems increased in sophistication and became more widespread, including power-assisted flight controls, blind flying instrumentation, radio communications and radar tracking.

== Ground activities ==
=== Manufacturing ===
Aircraft manufacturing remained a high priority throughout the war for all the key combatants and was a major part of their economic output. Women, and in Germany slave labour, were extensively employed due to the military call-up of able-bodied men.

Due to the threat of bombing, especially in Europe, manufacturing became progressively more dispersed. When British and American bombing raids started in earnest, Germany moved much of its production into underground factories.

Strategic materials such as aluminium for airframes and petroleum oil for fuel were in limited supply and soon became scarce. Many manufacturers, especially in the Soviet Union and, later on, in Germany turned to more readily-available raw materials such as timber and coal. The de Havilland Mosquito fighter-bomber was a rare British example of a wooden aeroplane.

=== Airfields ===
At the outbreak of war there were relatively few aerodromes capable of supporting military aircraft operations. Land-based aircraft with retracting undercarriage had superior performance to the equivalent seaplanes, leading to the widespread construction of aerodromes throughout all theatres of campaign. After the war many of these would become civil airports, providing the basis for a move of long-range passenger flights from flying boats to landplanes.

The increasing sophistication of warplanes meant that ground facilities also became more sophisticated. The high-powered engines in use could no longer be started by hand-swinging the propeller, but powered starting systems had to be provided, whether mechanical as with the Hucks starter or electrical as with the wheeled battery pack or trolley accumulator used for aircraft such as the Spitfire, which had an inbuilt electric starter motor.

== Military aviation ==
Aviation during this period was dominated by the conduct of the war, and the war in turn by air power. Aviation was heavily involved in the development of military technologies, strategies, tactics and events throughout the war.

At the outbreak of the war in Europe in 1939, the German Luftwaffe had amassed an attack force of modern all-metal cantilever monoplanes designed to support the Blitzkrieg style of warfare at relatively short range and manufactured by a large and organised industry. Pilots had been well-trained, both in flying clubs and in some cases the Spanish Civil War. Other European air forces, especially the British RAF were struggling to re-equip with similarly modern types and to train up aircrew. Early German successes, with the notable assistance of the Junkers Ju 87 Stuka dive-bomber, overran Europe and left Britain open to attack.

During the ensuing Battle of Britain, the British fighter squadrons had to quickly relearn the old tactical lessons from the first war. Initially the RAF fighters flew in a tight three-fighter arrowhead formation, soon changing to the looser four-aircraft arrangement which the Germans called the "finger-four." They soon also relearned the value of climbing above your opponent before attacking. At the same time, the development of an early radar warning system by the British provided a new way to track German attack formations as they gathered over the European coast and flew across the English Channel. The radio communications, provided to every pilot to support the Dowding system of coordination, also required new protocols such as radio silence before engaging the enemy.

Later on, the British and Americans developed large long-range heavy bombers, causing great damage to the German war effort and substantial casualties. While the British favoured unescorted night bombing, the Americans preferred to mount daytime raids, escorted by long-range fighters.

In the Pacific war, both sides made extensive use of aircraft carriers and carrier-to-carrier engagements became pivotal turning points in several campaigns.

== See also ==
- Aviation in World War I
- List of aircraft of World War II

== Civil aviation ==
Civil aviation continued in non-combatant countries.

In countries engaged in warfare, many civilian aircraft were pressed into military service. Some civilian operations were maintained, for example BOAC continued making overseas passenger flights, often camouflaging its aircraft.

Civil aviation is one of two major categories of flying, representing all non-military aviation, both private and commercial.
