= Popular Publications =

Pulp magazine publisher

- Founded: 1930
- Founder: Henry "Harry" Steeger
- Defunct: 1972
- Country of origin: United States
- Headquarters location: New York City
- Publication types: Pulp magazines

Popular Publications was one of the largest publishers of pulp magazines during its existence, at one point publishing 42 different titles per month. Company titles included detective, adventure, romance, and Western fiction. They were also known for the several 'weird menace' titles. They also published several pulp hero or character pulps.

== History ==
The company was formed in 1930 by Henry "Harry" Steeger, a former editor at Dell Magazines, and Harold S. Goldsmith, former managing editor of the Magazine Publishers group. It was the time of the Great Depression, and Steeger had just read The Hound of the Baskervilles where he ran Ace Publications. The original intention was for Steeger to mostly run the editorial side of the publishing company while Goldsmith would operate the business side. Steeger realized that people wanted escapist fiction, allowing them to forget the difficulties of daily life. Steeger wrote "I realised that a great deal of money could be made with that kind of material. It was not long before I was at it, inventing one pulp magazine after another, until my firm had originated over 300 of them."

In the late 1930s Steeger was under pressure to lower his rate of pay to below one cent a word, which he felt was the minimum decent rate he could offer. He didn't want to have Popular pay less than one cent per word, so a new company, Fictioneers, was started; it was essentially a fictional company, with an address (205 East 42nd St) that corresponded to the rear entrance of Popular's offices at 210 East 43rd St. It was given a separate phone number, and the switchboard girl was instructed to put calls through to staff working on Fictioneers titles only if the calls came to the Fictioneers number. Many staff were working on magazines for both companies at the same time, which made it difficult to maintain the pretense of separation. Science fiction writer Frederik Pohl, on the other hand, was hired specifically to edit two Fictioneers titles: Astonishing Stories and Super Science Stories.

The first four magazines published, all cover dated October 1930, were Battle Aces, featuring war stories consisting of dog-fights between squadrons of airplanes, Gang World, "dealing with tough and ready characters in conflict with each other and the law," Detective Action Stories, featuring true mystery and action type stories with the emphasis more on action than deduction, and Western Rangers, containing stories with "gun fighting, battles from ambush, and bandits running wild." The emphasis was on the action, not the "woman interest", which, if any, was to be kept "incidental".

In 1934, Popular acquired Adventure from the Butterick Company. Around the same time, they purchased a number of titles from Clayton Publications such as Ace-High Magazine and Complete Adventure Novelettes. In 1940, they purchased Black Mask from The Pro-Distributors, Inc. In 1942 the firm acquired the properties of the Frank A. Munsey Company. The company reached its peak of production right at the end of the second world war when Steeger recalls counting the magazine titles being put out one month and reaching the figure of 42 to 45. In 1949, they acquired all of the pulp titles Street & Smith had recently cancelled, with the exceptions of The Shadow (due to the radio show) and their other hero pulps, and Astounding, although Popular did not publish revivals of them all.

Other imprints used included Fictioneers, Inc. (1939–58), All-Fiction Field, Inc. (1942–58), New Publications, Inc. (1936–60), Recreational Reading (1936–60), and Post Periodicals, Inc. (1936–60). By the early 1950s the entire industry of pulp fiction imploded. In a 1973 interview, Steeger stated that to the best of his knowledge Popular Publications published no magazine in the old pulp size format after 1953. He believed that "the Pocketbooks were probably the main factor that contributed to the ultimate fading of pulps from the publishing field--then television came along and administered the 'coup de grace'."

In 1972, the company was sold to Brookside Publications, a company owned by advertising magnate David Geller. At the time it was still publishing Argosy, Railroad, recently ending Adventure and True Adventure. In c. 1977, Geller sold Popular to French publisher Hachette. In 1981, they sold the rights to Joel Frieman who established Blazing Publications, which in 1988 renamed itself Argosy Communications, Inc. Under those names, it published a few comic-book versions of characters, as well as allowed the reprinting of several of their properties. In 2014 most of its titles–including all copyrights and associated intellectual property–were acquired by Steeger Properties, LLC, with Argosy Communications retaining only a few pulp heroes such as The Spider, G-8, and Operator #5.

== Character magazines ==
- Captain Combat
- Captain Satan
- Captain V
- Captain Zero (considered the last hero pulp)
- Dr. Yen Sin (a Fu Manchu clone)
- Dusty Ayres and His Battle Birds
- G-8
- Wu Fang (a Fu Manchu clone)
- The Octopus (one-shot villain pulp)
- Operator No. 5
- Secret 6
- The Scorpion (one-shot villain pulp)
- The Spider

== Other titles ==
- Ace-High Detective Magazine
- Ace-High Magazine
- Ace-High Novels Monthly
- Ace-High Western Magazine
- Ace-High Western Stories Magazine
- Adventure
- All Aces Magazine
- All-American Fiction
- All-Star Love Magazine
- All-Story Detective
- All-Story
- All-Story Love
- All-Story Love Stories
- All-Story Love Tales
- All-Story Western
- A. Merritt’s Fantasy Magazine
- Argosy
- Argosy All-Story Weekly
- Astonishing Stories
- Battle Aces
- Battle Birds
- Big-Book Detective Magazine
- Big-Book Western Magazine
- Big Chief Western
- Black Mask
- Blue Steel Magazine
- Bulls-Eye Western Stories
- Candid Confessions
- Cavalier Classics
- Complete Mystery Novelettes
- Confession Novel of the Month
- Cowboy Movie Thrillers
- Crack-Shot Western
- Dare-Devil Aces
- Daring Confessions
- Detective Action Stories
- Detective Dime Novels
- Detective Fiction
- Detective Fiction Weekly
- Detective Story Magazine
- Detective Tales
- Dime Adventure Magazine
- Dime Detective Magazine
- Dime Mystery Magazine
- Dime Mystery Book Magazine
- Dime Sports Magazine
- Dime Western Magazine
- Dr. Yen Sin
- Double Detective Magazine
- Dusty Ayres and His Battle Birds
- Everybody’s
- Famous Fantastic Mysteries
- Famous Spy Stories
- Fantastic Novels Magazine
- Fantasy Fiction
- Fantasy Stories
- F.B.I. Detective Stories
- Fifteen Detective Stories
- Fifteen Love Stories
- 15 Mystery Stories
- Fifteen Range Romances
- Fifteen Sports Stories
- 15 Story Detective
- Fifteen Western Tales
- Fifth Column Stories
- Fighting Aces
- Flynn’s
- Flynn’s Detective
- Flynn’s Detective Fiction
- Flynn’s Weekly
- Flynn’s Weekly Detective Fiction
- Focus Magazine
- Foreign Legion Adventures
- .44 Western Magazine
- Four Star Love Magazine
- Fun for All
- Fun for One
- Gang World
- G-8 and His Battle Aces
- Glamorous Love Stories
- Horror Stories
- Knockout Magazine
- The Live Wire
- Love Book Magazine
- Love-Crime Detective
- Love Novel of the Month
- Love Novelettes
- Love Novels
- Love Revelations
- Love Romantic Magazine
- Love Short Stories
- Love Story Magazine
- Lovers Magazine
- Mavericks
- Max Brand’s Western Magazine
- Men’s Pictorial
- Munsey’s Magazine
- The Mysterious Wu Fang
- New Detective Magazine
- The New Fiction Library
- New Love Magazine
- New Sports Magazine
- New Western Magazine
- The Octopus
- The Pecos Kid Western
- Pioneer Western
- Railroad Magazine
- Rangeland Love Stories
- Rangeland Romances
- Rangeland Sweethearts
- Red Star Detective
- Red Star Love Revelations
- Red Star Mystery
- Red Star Secret Confessions
- Red Star Western
- Romance Western
- Romance Western Roundup
- The Scorpion
- Sea Novel Magazine
- The Secret 6
- Shock
- Silver Buck Western
- Sinister Stories
- The Spider
- Sports Novels Magazine
- Star Western
- Startling Mystery Magazine
- Story Digest
- Strange Detective Mysteries
- Super Science Stories
- Sweetheart Love Stories
- 10 Story Mystery Magazine
- 10 Story Western Magazine
- Terror Tales
- Thrilling Mysteries
- True Adventures
- True Love
- True Love Affairs
- Underworld Love Stories
- Underworld Romances
- Walt Coburn’s Western Magazine
- Western Ace High Stories
- Western Dime Novels
- Western Love Romances
- The Western Raider
- Western Rangers
- Western Rangers Stories
- Western Story Magazine
- Western Story Roundup
- Western Tales
