= Terror Tales =

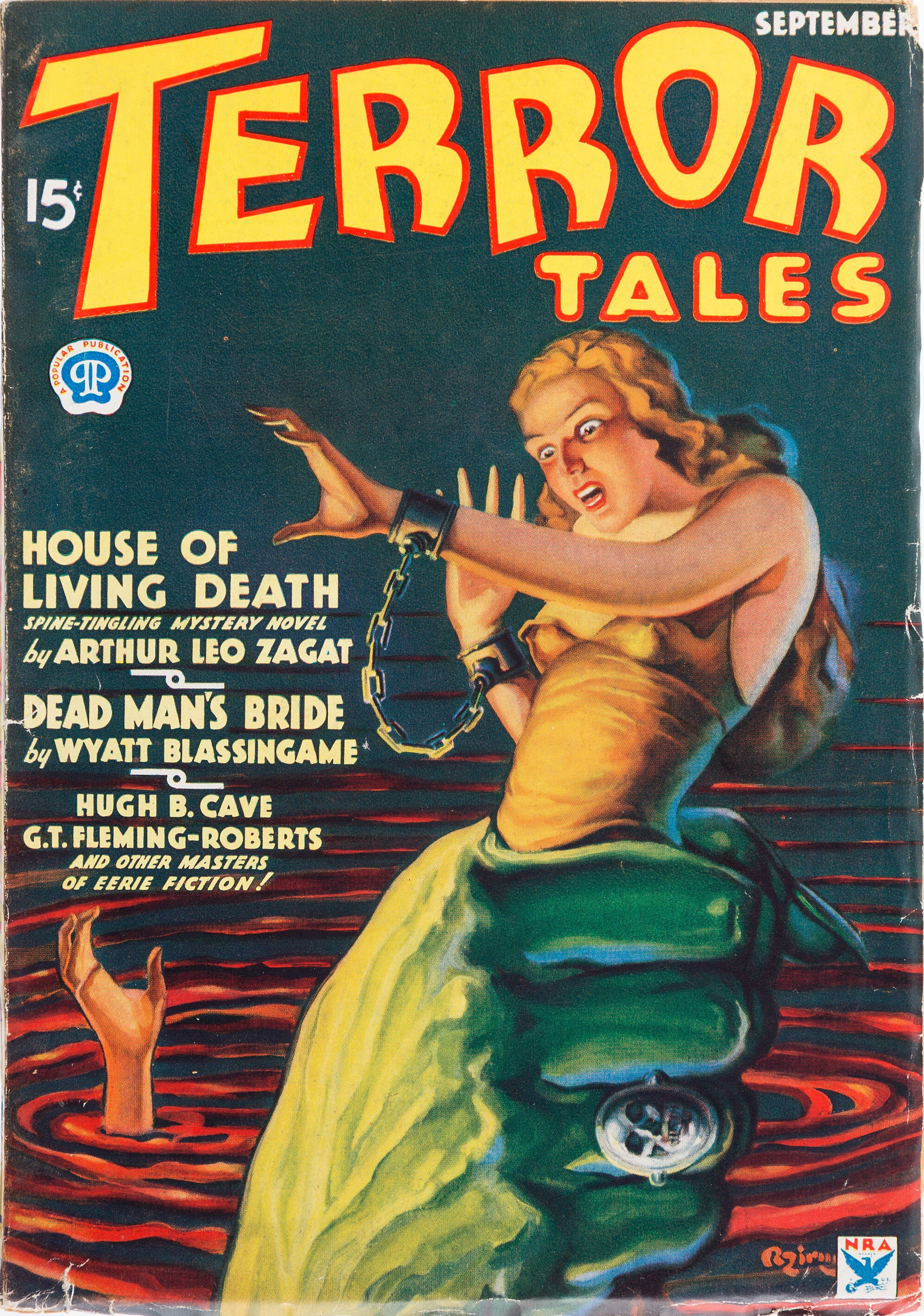

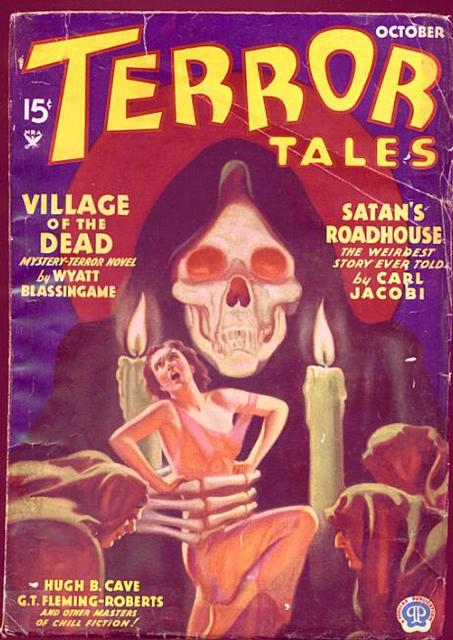

Terror Tales was the name of two American publications: a pulp magazine of the weird menace genre of the 1930s, and a horror comic in the 1960s and 1970s.

== Pulp magazine ==
Terror Tales was originally published by Popular Publications. The first issue was published in September 1934 One of the most successful horror magazines, it was joined shortly afterwards (1935) with its sister horror pulp, Horror Stories, also from the same publisher. Some of the writers whose work appeared in Terror Tales included E. Hoffmann Price, Wayne Rogers, Wyatt Blassingame (who later wrote nonfiction books for children), Ray Cummings, Paul Ernst, Arthur Leo Zagat and Arthur J. Burks. Rudolph Belarski provided several covers for the magazine. Terror Tales ceased publication in March 1941.

== Horror comics magazine ==
A later publication also called Terror Tales was a black-and-white horror comics magazine published by Eerie Publications. There were 46 issues, from March 1969 to January 1979.

Terror Tales followed many of the conventions of the horror comic genres, such as the use of scantily-clad damsel in distress covers.
