= Robbins (name) =

Robbins is an English language surname. People with the name include:

== A ==
- Aaron Robbins (born 1983), American football player
- Aidan Robbins (born 2000), American football player
- Alan Robbins (born 1943), American politician
- Alexandra Robbins (born 1976), American journalist and author
- Alfred Farthing Robbins (19th c.), British journalist and political biographer
- Alwyn Robbins (1920–2002), British geodesist
- Amy Robbins (born 1971), British stage, film and TV actress
- Amy Robbins (philanthropist) (born 1970), American businesswoman and philanthropist
- Andrea Robbins (born 1963), American artist
- Andrew Bonney Robbins (1845–1910), American entrepreneur, civil war veteran, real estate developer
- Apollo Robbins (born 1974), American security consultant and magician
- Arthur Robbins (1920–2010), Australian rules football player
- Asher Robbins (1757–1845), US Senator from Rhode Island
- Austin Robbins (born 1971), American football player
- Avalon Robbins (born 2001), American model and actress
- Ayn Robbins (late 20th c.), lyricist

== B ==
- Barbara Robbins (1943–1965), first American woman killed in the Vietnam War and first female CIA employee to die in action
- Barret Robbins (1973–2026), American football player
- Ben Robbins (born 1976), Australian rules football player
- Benjamin Robbins (1857–1953), New Zealand politician
- Benjamin Robbins Curtis (1809–1874), US attorney and Supreme Court Justice
- Bernie Robbins (early 21st c.), American businessman
- Betty Robbins (1924–2004), American cantor
- Brad Robbins (American football) (born 1998), American football player
- Brad Robbins (basketball) (born 1985), Australian basketball player
- Brent Robbins (early 21st c.), American psychology professor
- Brian Robbins (born 1963), American actor and producer
- Brian Robbins (born 1984), American Music Producer, Mixer and Engineer.
- Bruce Robbins (born 1959), American baseball player

== C ==
- Calvin H. Robbins (1840–1900), American physician and politician
- Carla Robbins (born c. 1952), American journalist
- Caroline Robbins (1903–1999), British historian
- Chandler Robbins (1810–1882), American minister
- Chandler Robbins (1918–2017), American ornithologist
- Charles Robbins (Royal Navy officer) (1782–1805), charted coast of southern Australia
- Charles Robbins (athlete), (1921–2006), American long-distance runner
- Charles Albert Robbins (1874–1930), American botanist and lichenologist
- Christopher Robbins (1946–2012), British writer and journalist
- Christopher Robbins (artist) (born 1973), American artist
- Chuck Robbins (late 20th/early 21st c.), American businessman
- Cindy Robbins (born 1937), American television actress and producer/writer
- Clifton Robbins (1890–1964), British journalist, writer, and executive of the International Labour Organization
- Clive Robbins (1927–2011), British music therapist
- Clyde Robbins (born 1931), United States Coast Guard vice admiral and senior civil servant
- Clyde W. Robbins (1926–2001), American farmer and politician
- Colin Robbins (born 1964), British software engineer
- Corky Robbins (mid 20th c.), American singer and songwriter
- Cory Robbins (born 1957), American record executive

== D ==
- Daniel Robbins (art historian) (1932–1995), American art historian
- Daniel Robbins (computer programmer) (early 21st c.), American computer programmer
- Darren Robbins (late 20th/early 21st c.), American singer-songwriter
- Dave Robbins (trombonist) (1923–2005), American trombonist, composer, and teacher
- Dave Robbins (late 20th/early 21st c.), American keyboardist with country music band Blackhawk
- Dave Robbins (basketball) (born 1942), American basketball coach
- David L. Robbins (Oregon writer) (born 1950)
- David L. Robbins (Virginia writer) (born 1954)
- David P. Robbins (1942–2003), American mathematician
- David Robbins (composer) (born 1955), American composer of film soundtracks
- David Robbins (artist) (born 1957), American artist
- Derek Robbins (born 1952), Canadian skier
- Dennis Robbins (late 20th c.), American musician
- DeAnna Robbins (born 1959), American actress
- Don Robbins (born c. 1934), American football coach
- Doren Robbins (born 1949), American poet, writer, artist, educator, and cultural activist
- Doug Robbins (late 20th c.), founder of Robbinex, a consultative business intermediary firm
- Doug Robbins (baseball) (born 1966), former baseball catcher

== E ==
- Edith Hyde Robbins, better known as Edith Hyde Robbins Macartney (1895–1978), first holder of the Miss America title
- Edmund Yard Robbins (1867–1942), American philosopher and professor
- Edward Robbins (1758–1837), Lieutenant Governor of Massachusetts and great-great-grandfather of Franklin Delano Roosevelt
- Edward E. Robbins (1860–1919), US Congressman from Pennsylvania
- Ellen Robbins (1828–1905), American botanical illustrator
- Everett Robbins (early 20th c.), American musician

== F ==
- Frank Robbins (1917–1994), American comic strip artist and writer
- Franklin Robbins (mid 20th c.), American tennis player
- Fred Robbins (born 1977), American football player
- Fred Robbins (broadcaster) (1919–1992), American radio personality and television host
- Fred A. Robins (early 20th c.), American football and baseball coach
- Frederick Chapman Robbins (1916–2003), American pediatrician and virologist

== G ==
- Gale Robbins (1921–1980), American actress and singer
- Garry Robbins (1957–2013), Canadian actor and professional wrestler
- Gaston A. Robbins (1858–1902), US Congressman from Alabama
- George R. Robbins (1808–1875), U.S. Representative from New Jersey
- George Collier Robbins (1823–c. 1907/1908), mayor of Portland, Oregon, U.S., 1860–1861
- George Robbins (footballer) (1903–1998), Australian rules footballer
- Gil Robbins (1931–2011), American singer, musician, and actor
- Gilbert F. Robbins (1838–1889), Mayor of Providence, Rhode Island
- Glen Robbins (early 20th c.), Canadian cyclist
- Glenn Robbins (born 1957), Australian comedian, writer, actor and radio personality
- Graham Robbins (born 1949), Australian rules football player
- Greg Robbins, American wrestler and silver medalist at 1987 Pan American Games

== H ==
- Hanmer Robbins (1815–1881), American politician
- Hargus "Pig" Robbins (1938–2022), American musician
- Harold Robbins (1916–1997), American author
- Harvey Frank Robbins (late 20th/early 21st c.), American cattle rancher
- Heidi Robbins (born 1991), American rower
- Herbert Robbins (1915–2001), American mathematician
- Hillman Robbins (1932–1981), American golfer
- Hollis Robbins (born 1963), American academic and scholar
- Horace Wolcott Robbins (1842–1904), American landscape painter

== I ==
- Ira Robbins (late 20th c.), editor and publisher of music magazine Trouser Press
- Irv Robbins (1917–2008), founder of the Baskin-Robbins ice cream parlor chain

== J ==
- Jake Robbins (born 1976), American baseball player
- James Robbins (journalist) (born 1954), BBC journalist
- James Robbins (shipbuilder), (died 1680), Danish shipbuilder
- James S. Robbins (born 1962), American author, professor, and special assistant to the US Undersecretary of Defense
- James Watson Robbins (1801–1879), American physician and botanist
- Jane Robbins (born 1962), British sculptor
- Jane D. Robbins (1919–12008) American Compton City councillor
- Jane Elizabeth Robbins (1860–1946), American physician and social worker
- J. Robbins (born 1976), American rock musician
- Jay M. Robbins (born 1945), American racehorse trainer
- Jay T. Robbins (1919–2001), U.S. Air Force General
- Jeff Robbins (born 1969), American musician and businessman
- Jennifer Niederst Robbins (late 20th/early 21st c.), American web designer
- Jerome Robbins (1918–1988), American choreographer, director, dancer, and theater producer
- Jess Robbins (1886–1973), American film director, writer and producer
- Jesse Robbins (born 1978), American entrepreneur and firefighter
- Jimmy Robbins (born 1989), American singer-songwriter and producer
- JoAnne Robbins (late 20th/early 21st c.), American speech-language pathologist, academic, researcher and entrepreneur
- John Robbins (author) (born 1947), American author, known for his books on food and health
- John Robbins (congressman) (1808–1880), American congressman from Pennsylvania
- John Robbins (illustrator) (died 2016), host of the public television program Cover to Cover
- John B. Robbins (1932–2019), American medical researcher
- John Everett Robbins (1903–1995), Canadian educator, encyclopedia editor and diplomat
- Jack Robbins (1916–1983), American football player
- Jack W. Robbins (1919–2005), American prosecutor at Nuremberg trials
- Joel Robbins (born 1961), American socio-cultural anthropologist
- Joni Robbins (late 20th c.), American voice actress
- Joseph E. Robbins (1901–11989), American film technician
- Josh Robbins (born 1983), American activist, blogger, talent agent, writer, and social media marketer

== K ==
- Kate Robbins (born 1958), English actress, comedian, singer and songwriter
- Kelly Robbins (born 1969), American golfer
- Kenneth X. Robbins (late 20th/early 21st c.), American psychiatrist, art collector, and author
- Kent Robbins (1947–1997), American songwriter
- Keith Robbins (1940–2019), British historian and university Vice-Chancellor

== L ==
- Larry Robbins (born 1969), American hedge fund manager
- Lee Robbins (1922–1968), American basketball player
- Lindy Robbins (late 20th/early 21st c.), American songwriter
- Lionel Robbins (1898–1984), British economist
- Lorcan Robbins (1885–1939), Irish politician
- Louise S. Robbins (late 20th/early 21st c.), American academic and librarian
- Lynn G. Robbins (born 1952), American general authority of the Church of Jesus Christ of Latter-day Saints

== M ==
- Marc Robbins (1868–1931), American actor
- Marcus Robbins (1851–1924), US Army Medal of Honor recipient
- Marty Robbins (1925–1982), American country singer
- Matthew Robbins (footballer) (born 1977), Australian rules footballer
- Matthew Robbins (screenwriter) (born 1945), American screenwriter, producer and director
- Merle Robbins (c. 1912–1984), inventor of the card game UNO
- Michael Robbins (1930–1992), British actor
- Missy Robbins (born 1971), American chef
- Monte Robbins (born 1964), American football player

== N ==
- Naomi B. Robbins, American expert in data visualization
- Neil Robbins (1929–2020), Australian long-distance runner
- Noah Robbins, American actor

== O ==
- Obedience Robbins (1600–1662), Virginia burgess
- Oliver Robbins (born 1975), British civil servant and Permanent Secretary of the Department for Exiting the European Union
- Ormond Robbins (1910–1984), American author
- Otho S. Robbins (1855–1927), American politician

== P ==
- Paddy Robbins (1914–1986), Irish footballer
- Pete Robbins (born 1978), American saxophonist and composer
- Peter Robbins (actor) (1956–2022), voice of Charlie Brown
- Peter Robbins (author) (born 1946), British author
- Peter Robbins (rugby union) (1933–1987), England rugby union player
- Phillips Robbins (born 1930), American biochemistry professor
- Prospect K. Robbins (1788–1847), American surveyor

== R ==
- Randy Robbins (American football) (born 1962), American football player
- Randy Robbins (director) (late 20th/early 21st c.), American television director
- Raymond Francis Robbins (1912–1980), American artist
- Red Robbins (1944–2009), American basketball player
- Rex Robbins (1935–2003), American actor and singer
- Richard Robbins (anthropologist) (born 1940), American anthropology professor
- Richard Robbins (artist) (1927–2009), British sculptor
- Richard Robbins (composer) (1940–2012), American film score composer
- Richard Robbins (poet) (late 20th/early 21st c.), American poet
- Richard E. Robbins (early 21st c.), American filmmaker and documentarian
- Robert D. Robbins (born 1944), American politician
- Rockie Robbins (late 20th c.), American singer
- Royal Robbins (1935–2017), American climber
- Royal Robbins (minister) (1788–1861), American minister
- Ryan Robbins (born 1972), Canadian actor
- Ryan Robbins (footballer) (born 1988), English football player

== S ==
- Sally Robbins (born 1981), Australian rower
- Samuel Robbins Brown (1810–1880), American missionary
- Samuel K. Robbins (1853–1926), New Jersey state politician
- Sarah Robbins (born 1992), Canadian soccer player
- Sarah Fraser Robbins (1911–2002) American natural history writer, educator and environmentalist
- Saul Robbins (1922–2010), American toy manufacturer, co-founder of Remco
- Silas Robbins (1857–1916), American lawyer
- Silas Webster Robbins (1785–1871), American lawyer and judge
- Stanley L. Robbins (1915-2003), American physician and pathologist.
- Stephen Robbins (born 1953), British Army Chaplain-General
- Stuart Robbins (1976–2010), British basketball player

== T ==
- Ted Robbins (born 1955), English actor, television presenter and radio broadcaster
- Terence Robbins (1934–2015), Welsh rugby player
- Terry Robbins (1947–1970), American activist
- Terry Robbins (footballer) (born 1965), English footballer
- Thomas Robbins (minister) (1777–1856), American teacher, minister, and librarian
- Thomas Robbins (sociologist) (1943–2015), American scholar and author
- Thomas H. Robbins, Jr. (1900–1972), American admiral
- Tim Robbins (born 1958), American actor, director and activist
- Tod Robbins (1888–1949), American author
- Todd Robbins (born 1958), American magician, lecturer, actor, and author
- Tom Robbins (1932–2025), American author
- Tom Alan Robbins (early 21st c.), American actor
- Tony Robbins (born 1960), American motivational speaker and life coach
- Tootie Robbins (1958–2020), American football player
- Trevor Robbins (born 1949), British professor of cognitive neuroscience
- Trina Robbins (1938–2024), American cartoonist and author
- Tristan Robbins (born 1996), British cyclist

== V ==
- Vernon K. Robbins (born 1939), American bible scholar and historian

== W ==
- Walter Robbins (1910–1979), Welsh football player
- Warren Delano Robbins (1885–1935), American diplomat
- Warren M. Robbins (1923–2008), American art collector
- Wayne Robbins (1914–1958), American author
- Wendy Robbins (born 1963), British radio and television presenter and producer
- William Robbins (actor) (died 1645), comic actor in the Jacobean and Caroline eras
- William Robbins (athlete) (1885–1962), American Olympic runner
- William D. Robbins (1874–1952), Mayor of Toronto
- William Jacob Robbins (1890–1978), American botanist and physiologist
- William M. Robbins (1828–1905), US Congressman from North Carolina
