= Charles Robbins =

Charles Robbins may refer to:

- Charles Robbins (Royal Navy officer) (1782–1805), charted coast of southern Australia
- Charles Robbins (athlete) (1921–2006), American long-distance runner
- Chuck Robbins (born 1965 or 1966), American businessman
- Charles Burton Robbins (1877–1943), American military officer
- Charles Albert Robbins (1874–1930), American amateur botanist and lichenologist

== See also ==
- Charles Robins (born 1935), English cricketer
- C. A. Robins (1884–1970), American politician
