= KSWB =

KSWB may refer to:

- KSWB (AM), a radio station (840 AM) licensed to serve Seaside, Oregon, United States
- KSWB-TV, a television station (channel 26, virtual 69) licensed to serve San Diego, California, United States
