= Richard Robbins =

Richard Robbins may refer to:

- Richard Robbins (anthropologist) (born 1940), teaching professor of anthropology at SUNY Plattsburgh
- Richard Robbins (composer) (1940–2012), American film score composer
- Richard Robbins (character), fictional character from the Another Code video games
- Richard Robbins (poet), American poet
- Richard E. Robbins, American filmmaker and documentarian
- Richard Robbins (artist) (1927–2009), British artist, sculptor and art teacher
- C. Richard Robins (1928–2020), American ichthyologist
