= Culture of capitalism =

Overview of the culture of a capitalist system

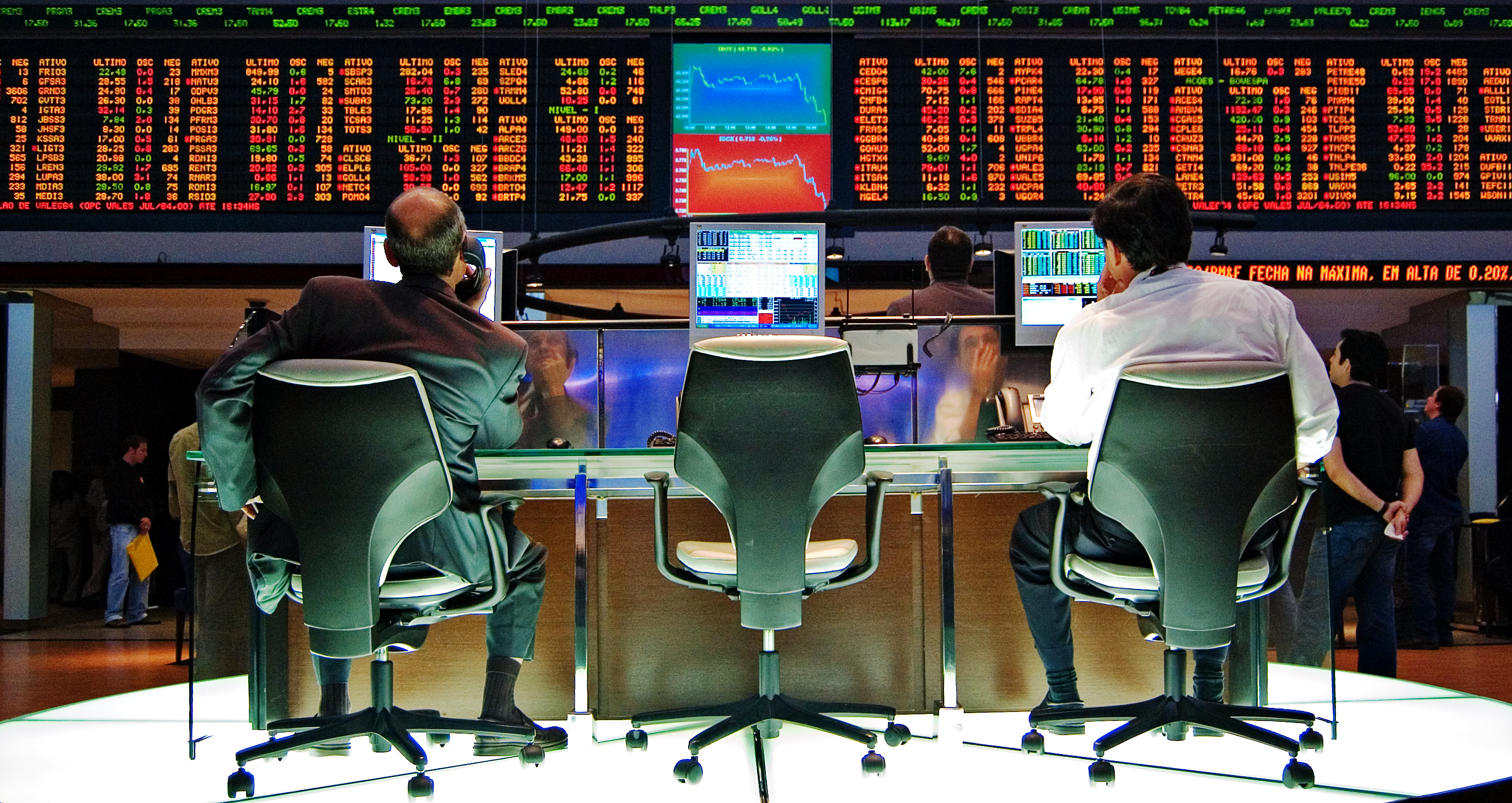
São Paulo Stock Exchange

The culture of capitalism or capitalist culture is the set of social practices, social norms, values and patterns of behavior that are attributed to the capitalist economic system in a capitalist society. Capitalist culture promotes the accumulation of capital and the sale of commodities, where individuals are primarily defined by their relationship to business and the market. The culture is composed of people who, behaving according to a set of learned rules, act as they must act in order to survive in capitalist societies.

Elements of capitalist culture include the mindset of business and corporate culture, consumerism and working class culture.

== Capitalist culture and ideology ==
While certain political ideologies, such as neoliberalism, assume and promote the view that the behavior that capitalism fosters in individuals is natural to humans, anthropologist Richard Robbins opines that there is nothing natural about this behavior - people are not naturally dispossessed to accumulate wealth and driven by wage-labor.

Political ideologies such as neoliberalism abstract the economic sphere from other aspects of society (politics, culture, family etc., with any political activity constituting an intervention into the natural process of the market, for example) and assume that people make rational exchanges in the sphere of market transactions. However, applying the concept of embeddedness to market societies, the sociologist Granovetter demonstrates that rational economic exchanges are actually heavily influenced by pre-existing social ties and other factors.

In a capitalist system, society and culture revolve around exploitative business activity (the accumulation of capital derived from the surplus generated by the labor of workers). As such, proponents of capitalism would have us believe that business activity and the market exchange are absolute, or "natural", in that all other human social relations revolve around these processes (or should exist to facilitate one's ability to perform these processes).

== See also ==
- Capital accumulation
- Capitalism
- Capitalist mode of production
- Capitalist state
- Consumerism
- Cultural capital
- Cultural economics
- Economic sociology
- Neoliberalism
- Organizational culture
- Protestant work ethic
