= Gallery Lodge =

Masonic lodge

The Gallery Lodge is one of two Masonic lodges within the UK Parliament. The core of its membership are journalists accredited to Parliament. It is the only lodge that is exclusively for journalists.

== See also ==
- Alfred Farthing Robbins
