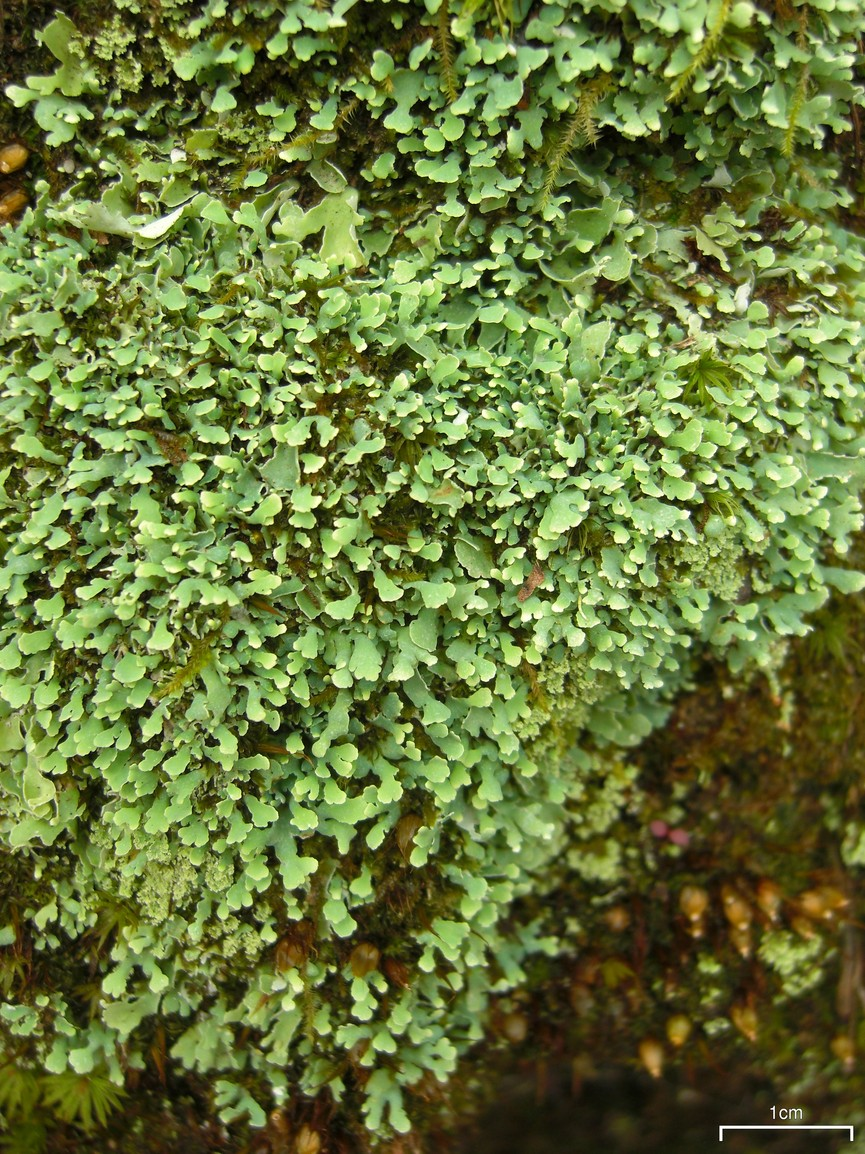

Conservation status
- Apparently Secure (NatureServe)

Scientific classification
- Kingdom: Fungi
- Division: Ascomycota
- Class: Lecanoromycetes
- Order: Lecanorales
- Family: Cladoniaceae
- Genus: Cladonia
- Species: C. apodocarpa

Binomial name
- Cladonia apodocarpa Robbins (1925)

= Cladonia apodocarpa =

Species of lichen

Cladonia apodocarpa, also known as the stalkless cladoniais or the stalkless cup lichen, is a species of cup lichen in the Cladoniaceae family. Found in North America, it was described as a new species by Charles Albert Robbins in 1925.

== See also ==
- List of Cladonia species
