= KSWB (AM) =

- Seaside, Oregon; United States
- Broadcast area: North Oregon Coast
- Frequency: 840 kHz
- Branding: 98.1 FM and 840 AM KSWB

Programming
- Format: Classic hits
- Affiliations: AP Radio

Ownership
- Owner: Jacobs Radio Programming, LLC
- Sister stations: KCYS; KEUB

History
- First air date: July 12, 1968 (at 930)
- Former frequencies: 930 kHz (1968–1984)

Technical information
- Licensing authority: FCC
- Facility ID: 43580
- Class: B
- Power: 1,000 watts (day); 500 watts (night)
- Transmitter coordinates: 45°58′54.4″N 123°55′6.5″W
- Translator: 98.1 K251CD (Seaside)

Links
- Public license information: Public file; LMS
- Webcast: Listen live
- Website: jacobsradiollc.com/stations/kswb/

KSWB (840 AM) is an American radio station licensed to serve Seaside, Oregon, United States. The station, which began broadcasting in 1968, is owned and operated by Jacobs Radio Programming, LLC.

== Programming ==
KSWB broadcasts a classic hits music format. In addition to its usual music programming this station also airs hourly newscasts from the Associated Press.

== History ==
=== Launch on 930 ===
This station began broadcasting on July 12, 1968, as a daytime-only station with 1,000 watts of power on a frequency of 930 kHz. The Seaside Broadcasting Corporation, with Gerald B. "Jerry" Dennon as president, held the license for the station which was assigned the KSWB call sign by the Federal Communications Commission (FCC). Dennon, founder of Jerden Records, co-owned Seaside Broadcasting and KSWB with American folk group The Brothers Four.

KSWB licensee Seaside Broadcasting Corporation was acquired by new owners on June 20, 1972. The station aired a contemporary music format throughout the 1970s.

=== Move to 840 ===
In March 1981, this station applied to the FCC for authorization to change the broadcast frequency from 930 kHz to 840 kHz and add nighttime service with 500 watts of power. A construction permit to make these changes was finally issued on May 29, 1984.

Seaside Broadcasting Corporation encountered financial difficulties and in March 1991 applied to the FCC to transfer the broadcast license for KSWB to Kenneth S. Eiler, acting as trustee. The transfer was approved by the FCC on June 3, 1991. In December 1991, trustee Kenneth S. Eiler reached an agreement to sell this station to the Monte Corporation. The deal was approved by the FCC on January 15, 1992, and the transaction was consummated on April 17, 1992.

In January 1995, the Monte Corporation reached an agreement to sell this station to Kenneth B. Ulbricht. The deal was approved by the FCC on October 5, 1995, and the transaction was consummated on the same day.

In February 1998, Ken Ulbricht reached an agreement to sell this station to Dolphin Radio, Inc. The deal was approved by the FCC on May 11, 1998, and the transaction was consummated on June 26, 1998.

In June 1999, Dolphin Radio, Inc., reached an agreement to sell this station to New Northwest Broadcasters through their New Northwest Broadcasters II, Inc., subsidiary. The deal was approved by the FCC on August 24, 1999, but the transaction was not consummated and the license remained with Dolphin Radio. In October 1999, Dolphin Radio, Inc., reached a new agreement to sell this station, this time to Cannon Beach Radio, LLC. The deal was approved by the FCC on January 6, 2000, and the transaction was consummated on March 10, 2000.

=== KSWB today ===
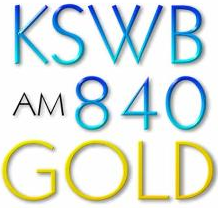
KSWB's logo under previous "840 Gold" branding

In January 2005, Cannon Beach Radio, LLC, reached an agreement to sell this station to KSWB Licensee, LLC. The deal was approved by the FCC on March 23, 2005, and the transaction was consummated on April 1, 2005.

In November 2016 KSWB began simulcasting on FM translator K251CD (98.1) and rebranded as "Radio Clatsop".

In July 2024 Jacobs Radio Programming, which already owned KCYS and KEUB in the Seaside area, agreed to buy KSWB from John Chapman's KSWB Productions; the $50,000 deal was accompanied by a local marketing agreement that started on July 1. That August, Jacobs rebranded the station "Classic Hits KSWB".

== Translator ==
KSWB is also broadcast on the following FM translator:

Broadcast translator for KSWB
Call sign	Frequency	City of license	FID	ERP (W)	Class	FCC info
K251CD	98.1 FM	Seaside, Oregon	157036	250	D	LMS
