= Ormond Robbins =

American novelist

Ormond Orlea Robbins
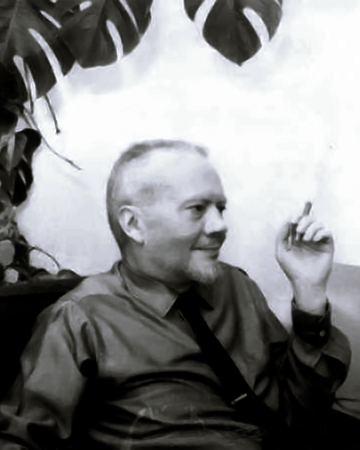
- Born: March 14, 1910; Stillwater, Oklahoma
- Died: July 21, 1984 (aged 74); Seaside, Oregon
- Education: University of Washington
- Occupation: Author
- Writing career
- Pen name: Dane Gregory, Breck Tarrant
- Language: American English
- Genres: Pulp Detective and Horror fiction
- Subject: Horror
- Movements: Hardboiled, Weird menace

Ormond Orlea Robbins (March 14, 1910 – July 21, 1984) was an American author of hardboiled detective fiction and weird fiction. His work was primarily published in the Popular Publications catalog of pulp fiction. The most part of his work for Popular Publications was attributed to his pen names Dane Gregory and, occasionally, Breck Tarrant.

In The Shudder Pulps, Robert Kenneth Jones places Dane Gregory's detective fiction in the vogue of the "defective detective" in the late nineteen-thirties and early forties. Recurring characters in Dane Gregory's fiction included Rocky Rhodes, ex-convict turned private investigator, and Satan Jones.

Ormond Robbins' brother Wayne Robbins also wrote fiction for the pulps. The two brothers even collaborated on a western story, Murder Boss Of The Poverty Pool that was featured in 10 Story Western Magazine in September 1941.

== Biography ==
Francis, Wayne, Ormond, and Lorimer Robbins

Ormond Robbins was born on March 14, 1910, in Stillwater, Oklahoma, to Charles L. and Clara (Brooks) Robbins. His family moved to Sunnyside, Washington, in 1919, where Ormond completed elementary and high school, class of 1928.

He began writing short stories, humor, and poetry at about age 12. By the age of 15, he regularly contributed to the pulp magazine College Humor. The Saturday Evening Post published a poem in their December 1, 1934, issue, and another in March of the following year. He saw another printed in the June 1935 issue of Country Gentleman. In 1936, the newly established Yakima Independent newspaper carried his daily column for about a year.

He married Jane Eshom on October 8, 1937, in Yakima, Washington. Their daughter, Alta Jane Robbins, was born on 15 April 1951. After a divorce, he married Wanda M. Falls at Bettles Field, Alaska on September 20, 1957. They had no children.

Ormond was unable to serve in World War II due to a 4f classification, but he and Jane were accepted by the Civil Aeronautics Administration (now the FAA) for outpost positions in Alaska. Ormond served as station manager, while Jane was a communications operator. Their first assignment was Nome, then Kotzebue in 1945, and then Bettles Field in 1951. He transferred with Wanda to Northway, and became district manager at Kenai. In 1969, he transferred to Anchorage, where he retired and became city manager at Kenai on January 20, 1970.

In 1974, Ormond and Wanda returned to Sunnyside, Washington to be near his father, his mother having died that year. After his father died in 1978, they moved to Seaside, Oregon, where Ormond died in 1984. He had survived both his first wife Jane and his daughter, and left no descendants.

== Bibliography ==
=== Published Short Stories and Novelettes ===
(Attributed to "Ormond Robbins.")
- Eternal, Complete Stories - August 1929 #2 (poem)
- Detective Novel, The Saturday Evening Post - December 1, 1934 (poem)
- Spirited Plea for a Return to the Old Order, The Saturday Evening Post - March 30, 1935 (poem)
- Unknown Title, Country Gentleman - June 1935 (poem)
(Attributed to "Dane Gregory" except where noted.)
- Dead Hands Seek My Bride, Terror Tales - January 1939
- Golden Lady of Death, Dime Mystery Magazine - April 1939
- When the Black Dolls Die, Dime Mystery Magazine - September 1939
- I Steal Your Blood!, Horror Stories - October 1939
- Society of Corpses, Dime Mystery Magazine - November 1939
- Prison-Made Justice, Detective Tales - December 1939
- Girls for the Corpse Clan, Horror Stories - December 1939
- Monsters Made for Murder, Dime Mystery Magazine - January 1940
- Hardly Thicker Than Water, Detective Tales - January 1940
- Last Mile, Detective Tales - February 1940
- Scalps for the Butcher, Dime Mystery Magazine - March 1940
- Dead Men Laugh Last, Detective Tales - April 1940
- Golden Lady of Death, Dime Mystery Magazine - April 1940 (a Rocky Rhodes novelette)
- Little Men from Hell, Dime Mystery Magazine - May 1940
- The Man with Two Souls, Terror Tales - May 1940
- Dopes Die Hard, Detective Tales - October 1940
- Death Winds the Clock, Dime Mystery Magazine - October 1940
- The Doomsday Book, Terror Tales - November 1940
- Peace McCabe's Bullet Mortgage, 10 Story Western - December 1940
- Dead Men Don't Need Alibis, Detective Tales - December 1940
- Beware the Crying Dead, Dime Mystery Magazine - January 1941
- Unknown Title, Detective Tales - February 1941
- Why Couldn’t She Stay Dead?, Dime Mystery Magazine - March 1941
- Remembrance of Horror, Horror Stories - April 1941
- Jackie Won’t Be Home, Detective Tales - June 1941
- The Man in the Murder Mask, Dime Mystery Magazine - July 1941
- My Night to Kill, Detective Tales - August 1941
- Murder Boss Of The Poverty Pool (with W. Wayne Robbins), 10 Story Western - September 1941 (correspondence from 3/4/1941, 4/24/1941)
- The Colonel Writes in Blood, Dime Western Magazine - September 1941
- Her Friend, the Killer, Strange Detective Mysteries - October 1941
- Her Friend, the Killer, Strange Detective Mysteries (Canada) - November 1941
- Murder Boss Of The Poverty Pool (with W. Wayne Robbins), 10 Story Western (Canada) - December 1941
- The Silver Bell of San Gee, Detective Tales - December 1941
- All at Once—No Wednesday!, Dime Mystery Magazine - January 1942
- Pride of the Fighting O'Malleys, Dime Western Magazine (Canada) - September 1942
- One Lucky Corpse, Detective Tales - February 1943
- If Thy Right Hand Offend Thee, Detective Tales - April 1943
- Human Interest Story, Argosy - March 1944
- Save a Grave for Me!, Detective Tales - October 1944
- El Libro del Juicio Final, Narraciones Terrorificas - June 1945 (translated and published by Editorial Molino, Argentina)
- The Mystery of Curly Bill, .44 Western Magazine - July 1951
- Death Song, 10 Story Western - August 1952
- No Town for a Tinhorn, Dime Western Magazine - September 1952
- Soronado Deadline (AKA Gun-Medicine Cures Texas Fever; as Breck Tarrant), 10 Story Western - October 1952
- Gun-Medicine Cures Texas Fever, (AKA Soronado Deadline; as Breck Tarrant), unknown issue
- Silvertip Courage, 10 Story Western - February 1953
- Wilderness Trap, 15 Western tales - March 1953
- Somebody Dies Tonight!, Dime Western Magazine - March 1953
- Unknown Title, Detective Tales - April 1953
- The Way of the Fighting O’Malleys (Pride of the Fighting O'Malleys), 10 Story Western - August 1953
- Last Deadline, Fifteen Western Tales - November 1953
- Silent Be My Grave, Fifteen Detective Stories - April 1954
- Unknown Title, Invincible Detective Magazine - April 1954 (Volume 5, Issue 53, Invincible Press, Sydney, Australia)
- Last Kill, Western Story Magazine - April 1955

=== Other Works Accepted by Popular Publications ===
- Judgment Seat, January 20, 1941

=== Anthologized works ===
- Jackie Won’t Be Home, 100 Crooked Little Crime Stories, Robert Weinberg, Stefan R. Dziemianowicz, & Martin H. Greenberg, Barnes & Noble Books, 1994, ISBN 1-56619-556-X
- Jackie Won’t Be Home, 100 Crooked Little Crime Stories, Robert Weinberg, Stefan R. Dziemianowicz, & Martin H. Greenberg, Sterling Pub. Co. Inc., 2004, ISBN 1-4027-1100-X
- The Mandarin’s Thirty-Third Tooth, It's Raining More Corpses in Chinatown, Don Hutchison, Adventure House, 2001, ISBN 1-886937-55-9
- Unknown Title, Tales of Mystery, Bill Pronzini, Bonanza Books, 1986, ISBN 0-517-61819-2 (includes selections by Hammett, Daly, McCoy, Nebel, Paul Cain, John D. MacDonald, Woolrich, Norbert Davis, Dane Gregory, D. L. Champion, Gault, Fredric Brown, and John Jakes)
- Unknown Title, Mal de ojo y otros relatos de terror, 1973, ISBN 978-84-272-1228-2

== See also ==
- Arctic Bush Pilot: From Navy Combat to Flying Alaska's Northern Wilderness, Jim Rearden, Epicenter Press, 2000, ISBN 978-0-945397-83-0.
- Cheechako on Wings, Brian Fortier, Trafford publishing, 2004, ISBN 1-4120-1727-0.
- List of horror fiction writers
- Category:Pulp fiction writers
