= Seaside, Oregon =

- City
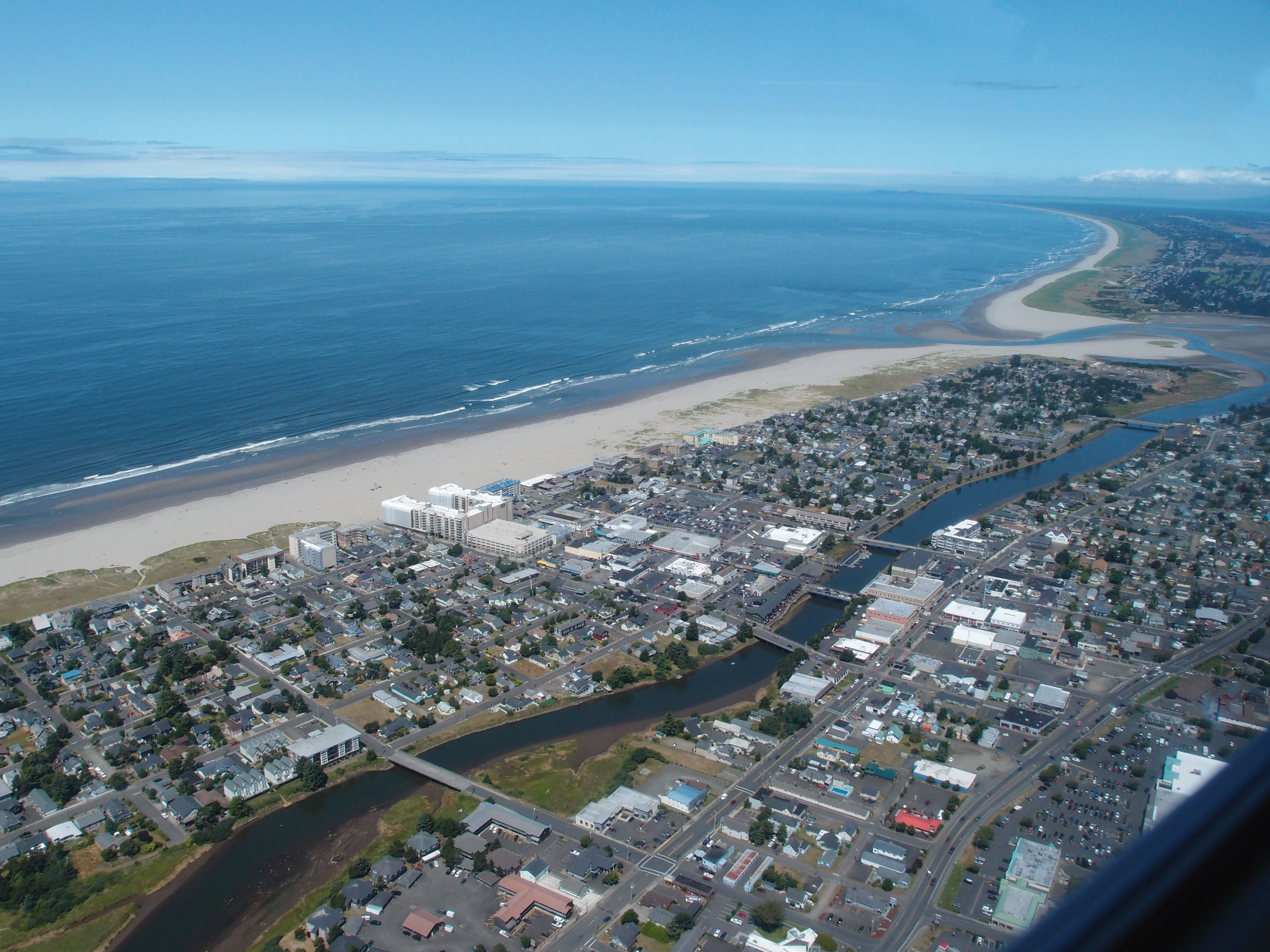
- Aerial view of Seaside, 2011

- Location in Clatsop County, Oregon
- Coordinates: 45°59′44″N 123°54′50″W
- Country: United States
- State: Oregon
- County: Clatsop
- Incorporated: 1899

Government
  - Type: Council-Manager
  - Mayor: Steve Wright

Area
  - Total: 4.05 sq mi (10.49 km^{2})
  - Land: 3.90 sq mi (10.09 km^{2})
  - Water: 0.16 sq mi (0.41 km^{2})
- Elevation: 23 ft (7.0 m)

Population (2020)
  - Total: 7,115
  - Density: 1,827/sq mi (705.4/km^{2})
- Time zone: UTC−08:00 (Pacific)
  - Summer (DST): UTC−07:00 (Pacific)
- ZIP Code: 97138
- Area codes: 503 and 971
- FIPS code: 41-65950
- GNIS feature ID: 2411854
- Website: www.cityofseaside.us

Seaside is a city in Clatsop County, Oregon, United States, on the coast of the Pacific Ocean. The name Seaside is derived from Seaside House, a historic summer resort built in the 1870s by railroad magnate Ben Holladay. The city's population was 7,115 at the 2020 census.

== History ==
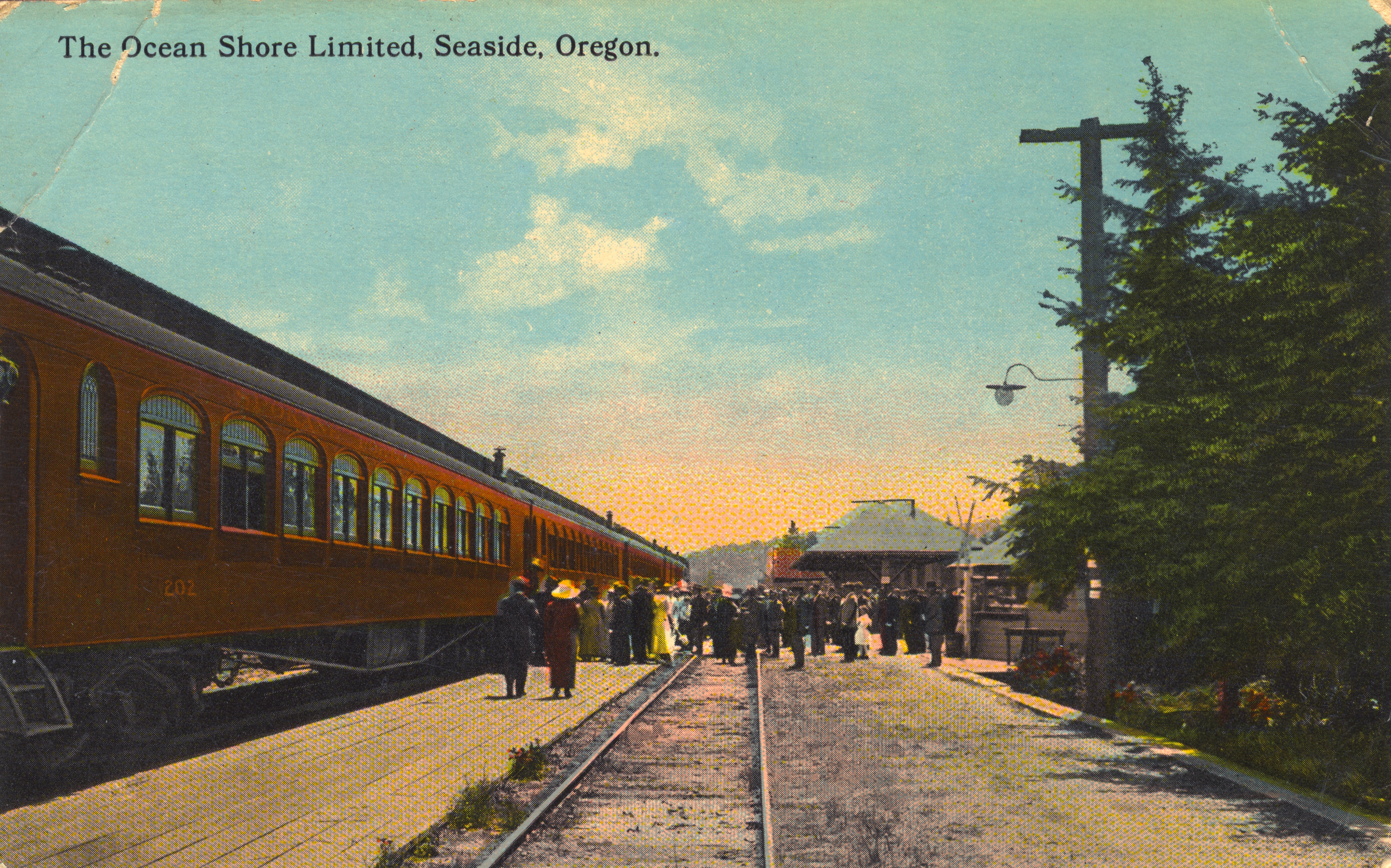
Ocean Shore Limited railroad at Seaside, circa 1910

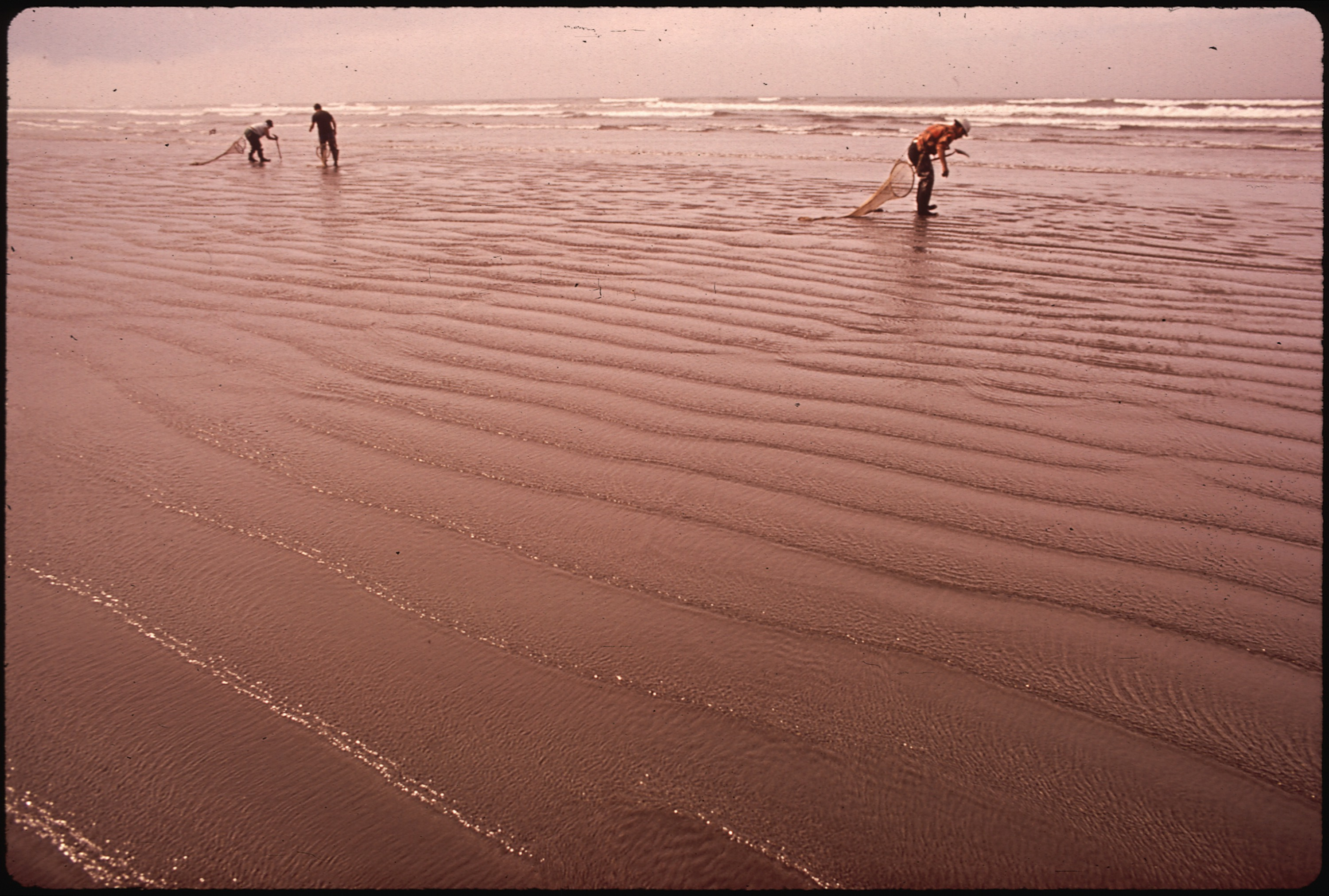
Harvesting razor clams

Around on January 1, 1806, a group of men from the Lewis and Clark Expedition built a salt-making cairn at the site later developed as Seaside. The city was not incorporated until February 17, 1899, when coastal resort areas were being settled. It is about 79 miles (127 km) by car northwest of Portland, Oregon, a major population center.

In 1912, Alexandre Gilbert (1843–1932) was elected Mayor of Seaside. Gilbert was a French immigrant, a veteran of the Franco Prussian War (1870–1871). After living in San Francisco, California and Astoria, Oregon, Gilbert moved to Seaside where he had a beach cottage (built in 1885). Gilbert was a real estate developer who donated land to the City of Seaside for its one-and-a-half-mile-long Promenade, or "Prom", along the Pacific beach.

In 1892, he added to his beach cottage. Nearly 100 years later, what was known as the Gilbert House was operated commercially as the Gilbert Inn since the mid-1980s. Both it and the "Gilbert Block" office building he built on Broadway still survive.

Gilbert died at home in Seaside and is interred in Ocean View Abbey Mausoleum in Warrenton.

== Geography ==
According to the United States Census Bureau, the city has a total area of 4.14 square miles (10.72 km^{2}), of which 3.94 square miles (10.20 km^{2}) is land and 0.20 square miles (0.52 km^{2}) is water.

Seaside lies on the edge of the Pacific Ocean, at the southern end of the Clatsop Plains, about 29 km (18 mi) south of where the Columbia River empties into the Pacific. The city is developed on both sides of the Necanicum River, which flows to the ocean at the city's northern edge. Tillamook Head towers over the southern edge of the city.

The geography associated with the gradual slope of the broad sandy beaches of Clatsop Spit provide excellent conditions for the formation of beds of millions of Pacific razor clams annually. The razor clams attract thousands of visitors to Seaside Beach each year. Waves attract surfers all year round to the sandy shores.

U.S. Route 101 passes through the city.

=== Climate ===
Seaside has an oceanic climate (Köppen Cfb), typical Pacific Northwest climate, bordering very closely on a warm-summer Mediterranean climate (Köppen Csb). It receives rainy winters and mild-to-cool summers. Mean high temperature in the warmest month, August, is roughly 68 °F (20 °C). The warmest heat waves, however, occur in September. The hottest day on record was 95 °F (35 °C), which occurred on both September 23, 1943 and September 24, 1974. The coldest temperature ever recorded was 5 °F (−15 °C) which occurred on December 8, 1972.

Climate data for Seaside, Oregon (1991–2020 normals, extremes 1930–present)
Month	Jan	Feb	Mar	Apr	May	Jun	Jul	Aug	Sep	Oct	Nov	Dec	Year
Record high °F (°C)	73 (23)	77 (25)	78 (26)	86 (30)	86 (30)	85 (29)	87 (31)	89 (32)	95 (35)	92 (33)	79 (26)	71 (22)	95 (35)
Mean maximum °F (°C)	61.6 (16.4)	63.0 (17.2)	66.5 (19.2)	70.4 (21.3)	73.9 (23.3)	69.8 (21.0)	73.6 (23.1)	76.1 (24.5)	82.1 (27.8)	75.2 (24.0)	63.4 (17.4)	60.3 (15.7)	86.0 (30.0)
Mean daily maximum °F (°C)	51.8 (11.0)	52.6 (11.4)	54.1 (12.3)	56.2 (13.4)	59.7 (15.4)	62.1 (16.7)	65.0 (18.3)	66.4 (19.1)	66.6 (19.2)	61.6 (16.4)	55.1 (12.8)	51.2 (10.7)	58.5 (14.7)
Daily mean °F (°C)	45.6 (7.6)	45.5 (7.5)	46.8 (8.2)	49.0 (9.4)	53.0 (11.7)	56.2 (13.4)	59.0 (15.0)	60.0 (15.6)	58.3 (14.6)	53.6 (12.0)	48.4 (9.1)	44.8 (7.1)	51.7 (10.9)
Mean daily minimum °F (°C)	39.3 (4.1)	38.4 (3.6)	39.5 (4.2)	41.8 (5.4)	46.3 (7.9)	50.4 (10.2)	53.0 (11.7)	53.5 (11.9)	50.1 (10.1)	45.6 (7.6)	41.7 (5.4)	38.5 (3.6)	44.8 (7.1)
Mean minimum °F (°C)	27.6 (−2.4)	26.5 (−3.1)	28.9 (−1.7)	32.2 (0.1)	36.3 (2.4)	41.9 (5.5)	45.6 (7.6)	45.9 (7.7)	40.3 (4.6)	33.5 (0.8)	28.9 (−1.7)	27.0 (−2.8)	23.0 (−5.0)
Record low °F (°C)	11 (−12)	9 (−13)	21 (−6)	24 (−4)	26 (−3)	36 (2)	35 (2)	32 (0)	30 (−1)	24 (−4)	14 (−10)	5 (−15)	5 (−15)
Average precipitation inches (mm)	11.03 (280)	8.05 (204)	9.42 (239)	6.56 (167)	3.87 (98)	2.66 (68)	0.95 (24)	1.20 (30)	2.91 (74)	6.63 (168)	12.01 (305)	11.42 (290)	76.71 (1,947)
Average precipitation days (≥ 0.01 in)	21.3	18.1	20.7	17.2	13.6	11.1	6.7	7.2	8.6	14.5	20.3	21.8	181.1
Average relative humidity (%)	81	82	81	81	81	82	83	84	82	81	82	81	82
Mean daily sunshine hours	3.9	3.9	5.6	7.4	8.3	8.9	9.8	10.0	8.8	5.2	4.4	4.2	6.7
Mean daily daylight hours	9.1	10.4	12.0	13.6	15.0	15.7	15.3	14.1	12.5	10.9	9.5	8.7	12.2
Average ultraviolet index	3	2	3	3	4	4	4	4	4	3	2	2	3
Source 1: NOAA
Source 2: Weather Atlas (UV and humidity)

=== Tsunami inundation zone ===
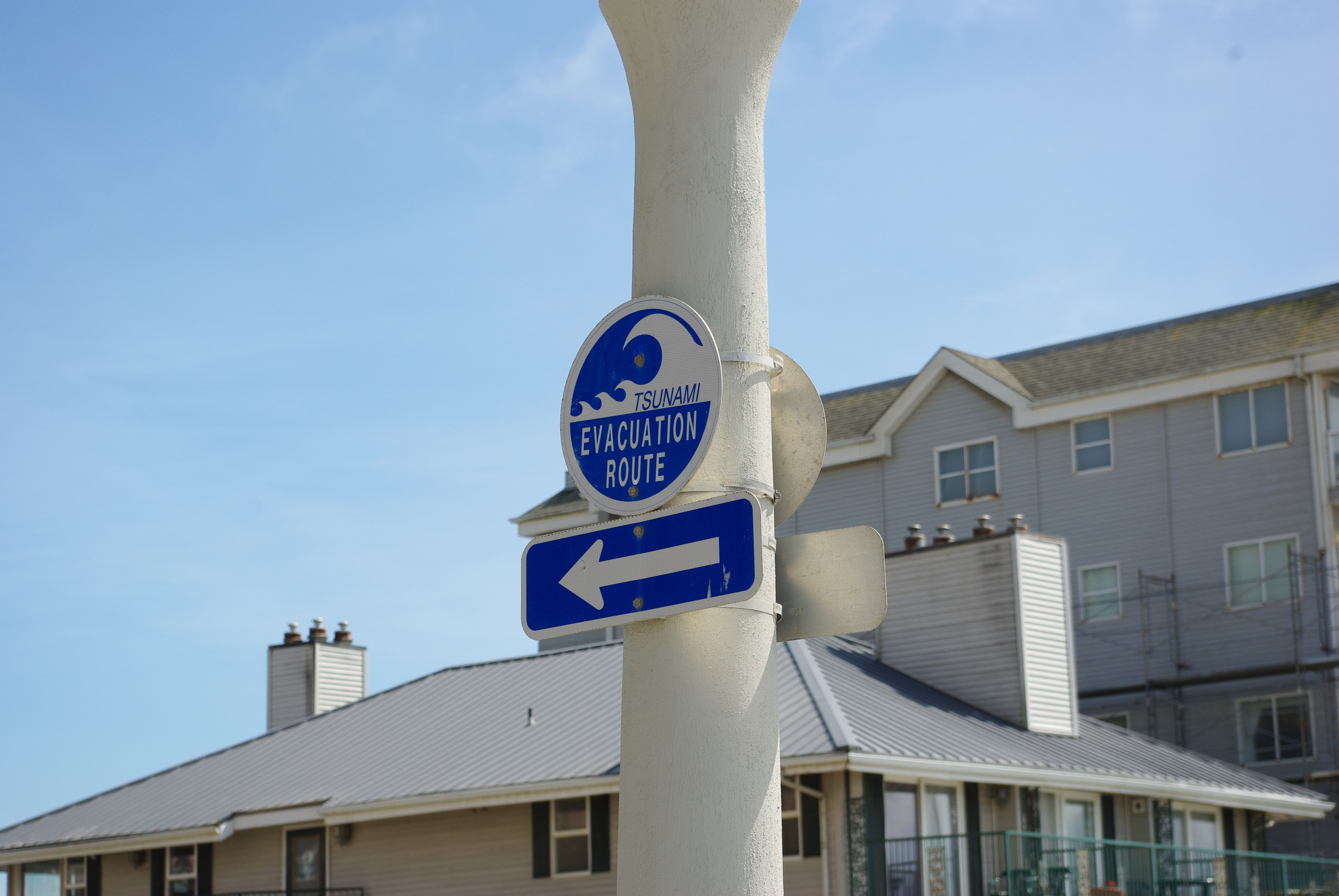
A tsunami evacuation sign in Seaside.

Part of Seaside is located in a tsunami inundation zone. Among other preparations, the City of Seaside has embarked on a program in which residents above the zone are asked to volunteer to store within their homes barrels of medical supplies, water purification systems, emergency rations, tarps, and radios, with each barrel having enough supplies to last 20 individuals for at least three days. As of January 2017, there are 119 barrels within volunteer households and a waiting list of interested households.

In 2016, Seismologists estimate that there is a one in three chance that Seaside will be hit by an earthquake and tsunami within the next fifty years. On Tues. Nov. 8, 2016, Seaside citizens voted 65% to 35% to issue $99.7 million in bonds to move the remaining three schools out of the tsunami inundation zone.

== Demographics ==
Historical population
Census	Pop.	Note	%±
1880	75		—
1890	87		16.0%
1900	191		119.5%
1910	1,121		486.9%
1920	1,802		60.7%
1930	1,565		−13.2%
1940	2,902		85.4%
1950	3,886		33.9%
1960	3,877		−0.2%
1970	4,402		13.5%
1980	5,193		18.0%
1990	5,359		3.2%
2000	5,900		10.1%
2010	6,457		9.4%
2020	7,115		10.2%

=== 2020 census ===
As of the 2020 census, Seaside had a population of 7,115. The median age was 45.0 years. 18.6% of residents were under the age of 18 and 24.3% of residents were 65 years of age or older. For every 100 females there were 93.4 males, and for every 100 females age 18 and over there were 90.5 males age 18 and over.

99.0% of residents lived in urban areas, while 1.0% lived in rural areas.

There were 3,215 households in Seaside, of which 23.5% had children under the age of 18 living in them. Of all households, 35.3% were married-couple households, 22.5% were households with a male householder and no spouse or partner present, and 33.2% were households with a female householder and no spouse or partner present. About 37.4% of all households were made up of individuals and 18.4% had someone living alone who was 65 years of age or older.

There were 4,818 housing units, of which 33.3% were vacant. Among occupied housing units, 45.5% were owner-occupied and 54.5% were renter-occupied. The homeowner vacancy rate was 2.5% and the rental vacancy rate was 8.2%.

Racial composition as of the 2020 census
Race	Number	Percent
White	5,626	79.1%
Black or African American	97	1.4%
American Indian and Alaska Native	74	1.0%
Asian	126	1.8%
Native Hawaiian and Other Pacific Islander	12	0.2%
Some other race	523	7.4%
Two or more races	657	9.2%
Hispanic or Latino (of any race)	1,115	15.7%

=== 2010 census ===
As of the census of 2010, there were 6,457 people, 2,969 households, and 1,565 families residing in the city. The population density was 1,638.8 inhabitants per square mile (632.7/km^{2}). There were 4,638 housing units at an average density of 1,177.2 units per square mile (454.5 units/km^{2}). The racial makeup of the city was 88.1% White, 0.6% African American, 0.8% Native American, 1.4% Asian, 0.1% Pacific Islander, 5.8% from other races, and 3.1% from two or more races. Hispanic or Latino of any race were 12.4% of the population.

There were 2,969 households, of which 24.2% had children under the age of 18 living with them, 35.4% were married couples living together, 11.5% had a female householder with no husband present, 5.8% had a male householder with no wife present, and 47.3% were non-families. 38.6% of all households were made up of individuals, and 15.4% had someone living alone who was 65 years of age or older. The average household size was 2.16 and the average family size was 2.83.

The median age in the city was 41.5 years. 20% of residents were under the age of 18; 9.3% were between the ages of 18 and 24; 24.7% were from 25 to 44; 28.6% were from 45 to 64; and 17.4% were 65 years of age or older. The gender makeup of the city was 48.3% male and 51.7% female.

== Arts and culture ==
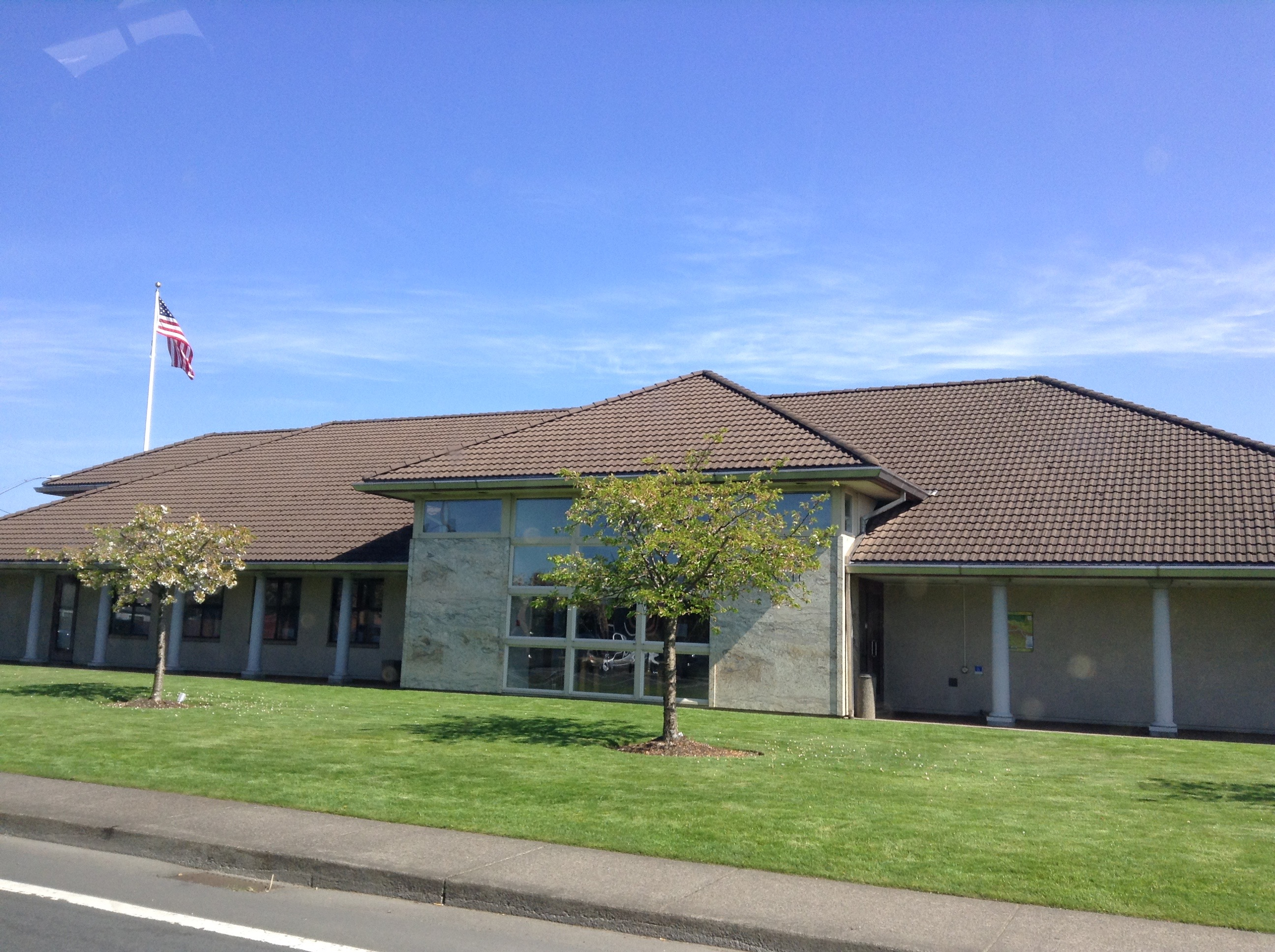
Seaside City Hall

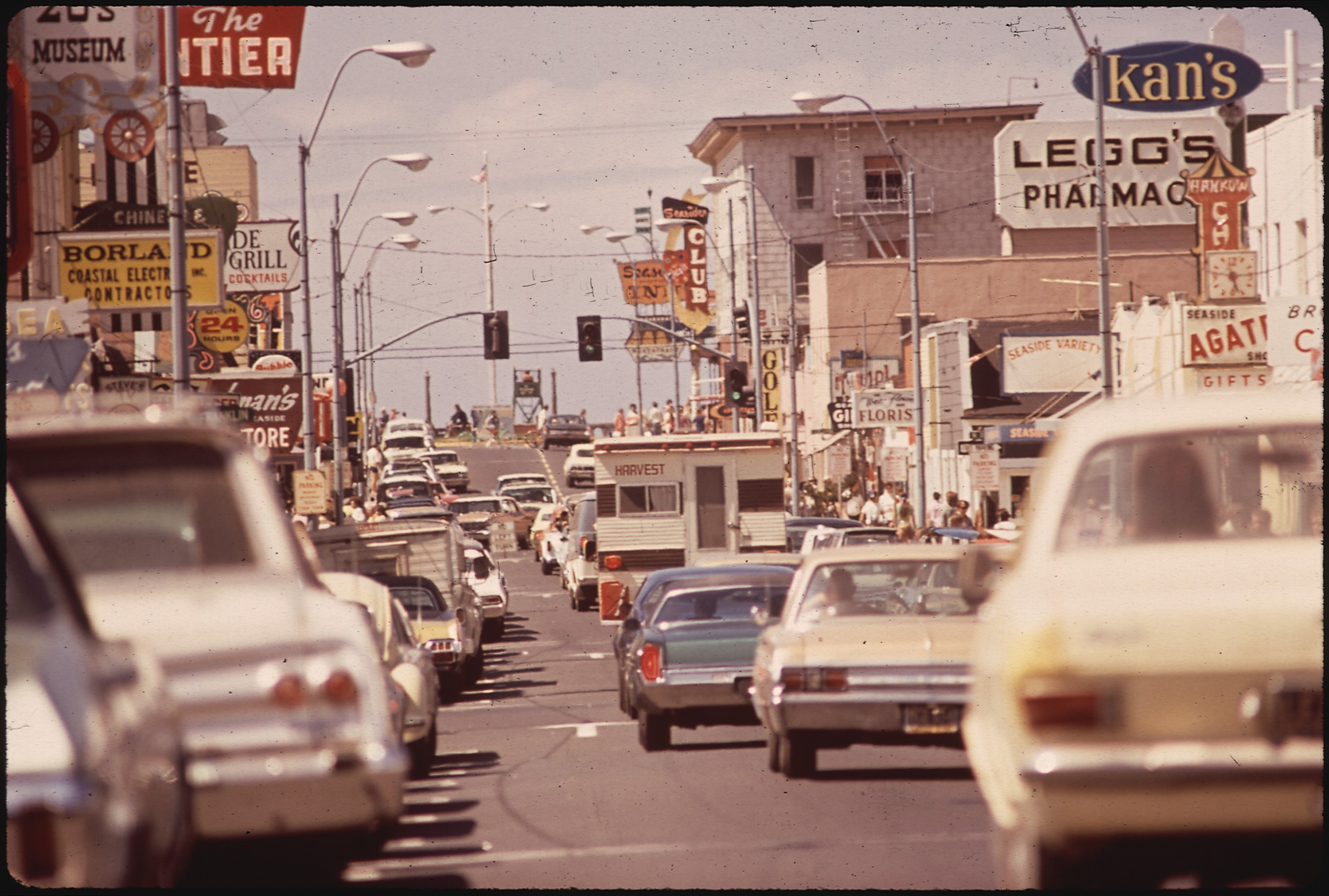
Seaside in 1972

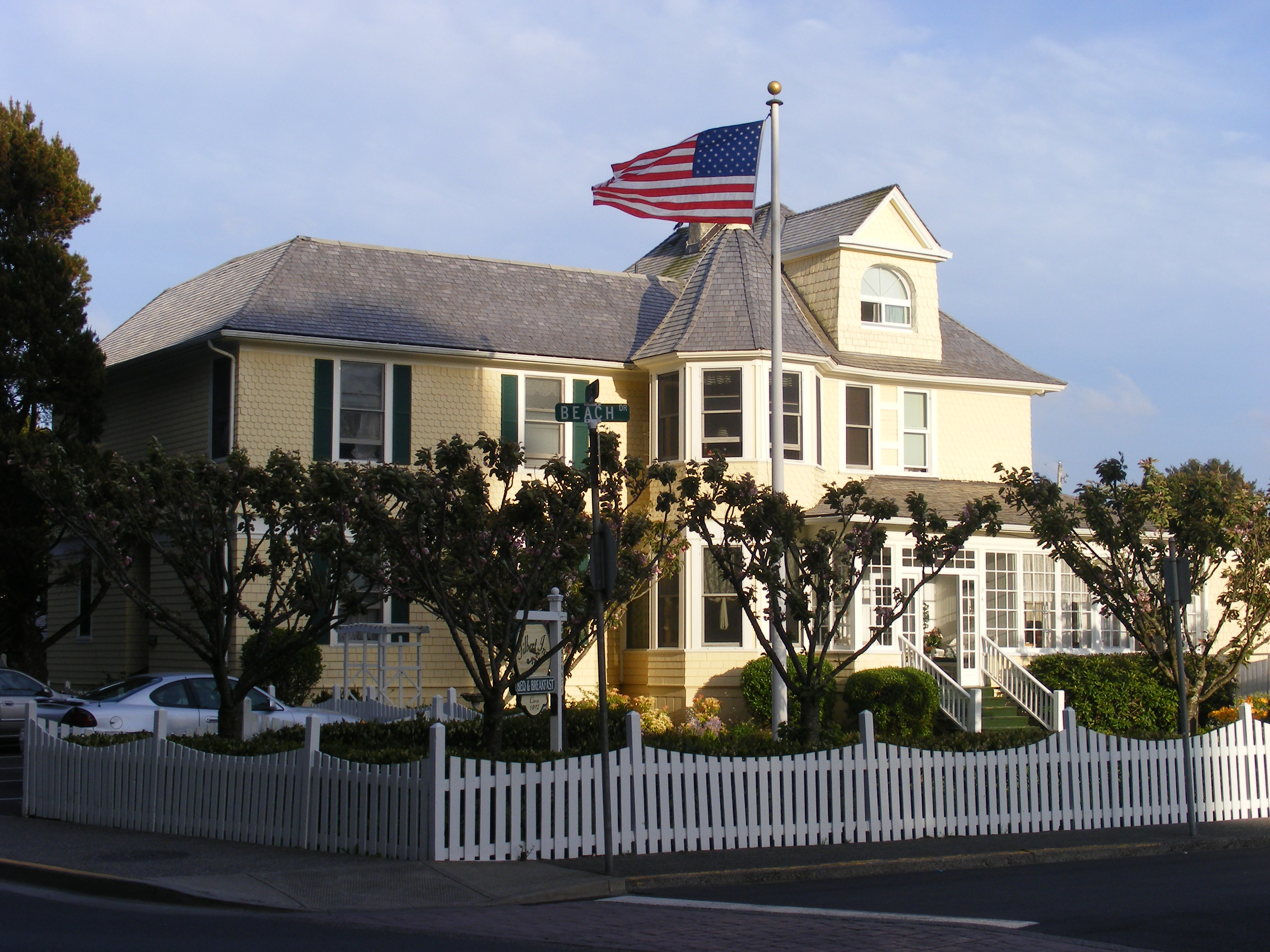
Gilbert House in Seaside

Seaside holds an art walk the first Saturday of each month from March through December. Several galleries are located along Broadway street in the historic Gilbert District.

The Seaside Jazz Festival (formerly the Oregon Dixieland Jubilee) was a long-running annual festival that featured some of the most popular Trad Jazz and Swing bands in the US and Canada.

=== Annual cultural events ===
Seaside hosts an annual 4th of July celebration which includes a parade, outdoor concerts, and one of the largest fireworks displays on the west coast.

Every spring until 2016 Seaside hosted the Dorchester Conference, a convention of Oregon political activists, typically conservative, independent, or center-right. This convention was founded in 1964 by then-state representative Bob Packwood as a forum for all Republicans statewide.

In the 1990s, it became dominated by members of the conservative branch of the party. Over the years the conference has attracted visits from presidential candidates, debates between Republican primary candidates, and discussions of wider political and social issues. It is run by an independent board and is not formally affiliated with the Oregon Republican Party.

The Miss Oregon Pageant, the official state finals to the Miss America Pageant, takes place annually at the Seaside Civic and Convention Center.

Seaside Beach Volleyball, the 2nd largest Beach Volleyball Tournament in the world takes place annually on the 2nd weekend of August. Started in 1982 the tournament has grown each year. In 2022 Seaside Beach Volleyball had over 1,800 teams and 192 courts for the four days of tournament play.

The annual Salt Maker's Return is held in September. The themed event celebrates Seaside history. Five men of the Lewis and Clark expedition needed nearly two months to make the equivalent of 28 US gallons (110 L) of salt; it was critical for them to be able to preserve meat for the winter and their several thousand-mile journey home to the East.

== Media ==
=== Newspaper ===
- Seaside Signal

=== Radio ===
- KSWB — 840 AM (Classic Hits)
- KBGE — 94.9 FM (AAA)
- KCYS — 96.5 FM (Country)
- KCRX — 102.3 FM (Classic Rock)
- KMUN — 91.9 FM

== Education ==
It is in the Seaside School District 10. The comprehensive high school of that district is Seaside High School.

Clatsop County is in the boundary of Clatsop Community College.

== Infrastructure ==
- Seaside has two major highways, U.S. Route 101 and U.S. Route 26.
- Seaside is served by an intercity bus system.
- Seaside Municipal Airport
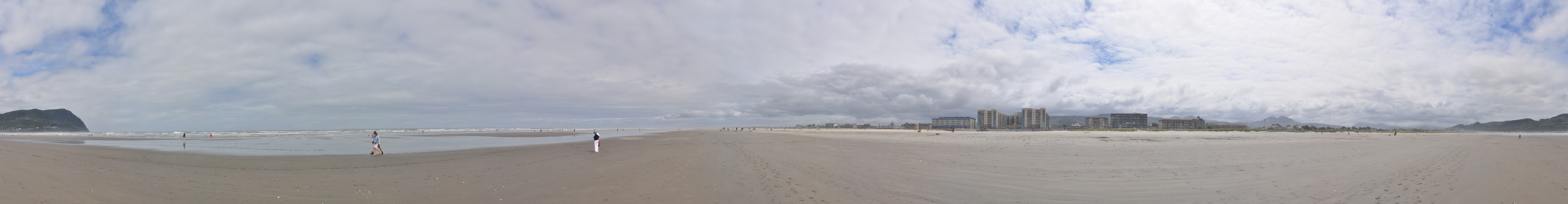
Panoramic view from the beach at Seaside; Tillamook Head at left

== Notable people ==
- Deborah Boone (born 1951), member of Oregon's House of Representatives
- Ken Carpenter (1926–2011), American football player
- Betsy Eby (born 1967), painter
- Charles Irving Elliott (1892–1972), Aviation Pioneer
- Karl Marlantes (born 1944), author, businessman and decorated Marine veteran.
- Ruth Radelet (born 1982), singer and musician of Chromatics
- Ormond Robbins (1910–1984), author
- John Schlee (1939–2000), golfer
- Norton Simon (1907–1993), industrialist and philanthropist
- E. E. Smith (1890–1965), author
- Tsin-is-tum (c. 1814 – 1905), Native American folklorist
- Mark Wiebe (born 1956), golfer
