= Silas Webster Robbins =

American judge (1785–1871)

- Born: August 24, 1785; Wethersfield, Connecticut, U.S.
- Died: June 19, 1871 (aged 85); Springfield, Illinois, U.S.
- Occupations: Lawyer; judge
- Spouse: Caroline Tracy (m. 1812; died 1837)
- Children: 1

Silas Webster Robbins (August 24, 1785 – June 19, 1871) was an American justice of the Supreme Court of Kentucky.

== Early life ==
Silas Webster Robbins was born on August 24, 1785, to Eunice (née Webster) and Jacob Robbins in Wethersfield, Connecticut. His father was from Rocky Hill. Robbins graduated from Yale University in 1808. Following graduation, Robbins entered the Law School at Litchfield under Judge Reeve.

== Career ==
In 1811, Robbins emigrated to Kentucky and began practicing law in Winchester. Robbins was appointed judge of the Supreme Court of Kentucky. He was conspicuous as an "Old Court Judge" in the Old Court – New Court controversy.

In 1838, Robbins moved to Springfield, Illinois, where he continued to practice law. He retired in 1858 and had a farm in the Springfield township.

== Personal life ==
In 1812, Robbins married Caroline Tracy, youngest daughter of U.S. senator Uriah Tracy in Litchfield. His wife died in 1837. He married again and had one daughter.

Robbins died on June 19, 1871, at his home in Springfield township.
