= Wayne Robbins =

American author (1914–1958)

Windom Wayne Robbins
- Born: July 22, 1914; Stillwater, Oklahoma
- Died: January 18, 1958 (aged 43); Spokane, Washington
- Occupations: Author, Artist, Propagandist
- Writing career
- Pen name: Wayne Robbins, W. Wayne Robbins, Wyndham Brooks
- Language: American English
- Genres: Pulp fiction, Sci fi, Horror
- Subject: Horror
- Movement: Weird menace

Windom Wayne Robbins (July 22, 1914 – January 18, 1958) was an American author of horror fiction and weird menace. Such stories often dealt with standard themes required by the publisher; those involving "Inescapable Doom" were supplied by Donald Dale (Mary Dale Buckner). Mindret Lord handled the "Woman Without Volition". Ray Cummings delivered stories about the "Girl Obsessed". Many of Robbins' stories portrayed the "Man Obsessed" and a subsequent descent into madness. His work was primarily published in the Popular Publications catalog of pulp magazines, starting with Horror's Holiday Special in the July 1939 issue of Dime Mystery Magazine.

Robert Kenneth Jones reported that Robbins "excelled in explosive chaos" and called Test Tube Frankenstein from the May 1940 issue of Terror Tales, a tale of biological mimicry along the lines of Don A. Stuart's Who Goes There?, "credible". 'This story is billed in Sheldon Jaffery's anthology Sensuous Science Fiction of the Weird and Spicy Pulps as "one of the best of its kind to be published".

Robbins' published works are usually attributed to Wayne Robbins or W. Wayne Robbins, but he occasionally used the pen name Wyndham Brooks, a variation on his given name and his mother's maiden name. His brother, Ormond Robbins, also wrote horror, hardboiled, and western fiction for Popular Publications, as Dane Gregory or Breck Tarrant.

== Biography ==
Francis, Wayne, Ormond, and Lorimer Robbins

Wayne Robbins was born in Pawnee/Stillwater, Oklahoma to Charles L. Robbins and Clara Pauline Robbins née Brooks on July 22, 1914. The family moved from Stillwater to Sunnyside, Washington in March 1919. He graduated (valedictorian) from Washington High School in May 1932. He was something of a polymath, showing ability in music, sculpture, painting, and writing.

During the Depression, he painted signs and posters with his brother Francis, first in Sunnyside, then in Yakima, Washington. He married Margaret Elizabeth Marlin on July 16, 1936 in Prosser, Washington, bearing a son and daughter.

In late 1930s, he became a successful freelance writer for pulp magazines. Popular Publications was one of the more attractive pulp publishers to work with since they offered at least a penny or more per word accepted.

During World War II, Robbins wrote speeches and propaganda for the United States Department of Agriculture at Bozeman, Montana and Pullman, Washington. When his brother Francis returned from the North African Campaign of World War II to Spokane, Washington in 1943, he shortly relocated there himself. He found employment with the Naval Supply Depot near Spokane where he painted signs. He and Francis pooled their resources to buy a house in Spokane. When the war ended, Wayne and a partner, Vic B. Linden, opened a sign painting shop in Spokane called Post Street Signs. The business was sold about 1951 and the family relocated to Ephrata, Washington where he worked in a neon sign shop. In the spring of 1952 the family returned to their home in Spokane (which had been rented out). He found employment at Valley Neon Company in Spokane Valley where he worked until shortly before his death. He was a member of the Sign and Pictorial Artists' Union.

The death of Robbins' brother Francis in 1949 was a great shock to him and may have contributed to his own death in 1958, following a three-month illness. He is buried at Riverside Memorial Park Cemetery in Spokane, Washington.

== Works ==
=== Published ===
- Horror’s Holiday Special (Blood Will Soothe My Madness), Dime Mystery Magazine - July 1939
- Guide to Horror House (Minion of Madness), Horror Stories - October 1939
- Bride for the Butcher (Bride of the Butcher), Dime Mystery Magazine - November 1939
- Evil Lives in My Hands, Dime Mystery Magazine - December 1939
- Their Flesh Is Soft and Tender, Terror Tales - January 1940
- I Am the Madman! (as Wyndham Brooks), Terror Tales - January 1940
- The Thing in Search of a Body (Her Heritage is Hate), Dime Mystery Magazine - February 1940
- Author! Author!, Dime Mystery Magazine - February 1940
- They Seek Your Skin!, Dime Mystery Magazine - March 1940
- Mates for the Passion Flower (Terror From the Tropics), Terror Tales - March 1940
- The Unborn Horror (The Senseless Horror; as Wyndham Brooks), Terror Tales - March 1940
- Mad is the Flesh-Master!, Dime Mystery Magazine - April 1940
- The Soul-Thief, Horror Stories - May 1940
- Test-Tube Frankenstein, Terror Tales - May 1940
- The Zombie Master, Terror Tales - July 1940
- Asylum for Murder, Dime Mystery Magazine - July 1940
- The Thing from Beyond, Horror Stories - August 1940
- The Last Horror (as Wyndham Brooks), Horror Stories - August 1940
- The Nightmare Dreamer (as Wyndham Brooks), Horror Stories - August 1940
- A Beast Is Born, Horror Stories - October 1940
- Seal Tight His Grave!, Terror Tales - November 1940
- Mistress of the Dead, Horror Stories - December 1940
- At Home in Hell (as Wyndham Brooks), Horror Stories - December 1940
- The Sealed Jar Horror, Terror Tales - January 1941
- Brother of the Beast, Horror Stories - April 1941
- Murder Boss of The Poverty Pool (with Dane Gregory), 10 Story Western - September 1941
- Gunman’s Honor (Vengeance by Proxy), Big-Book Western Magazine - April 1942
- The Nightmare Dreamer (as Wyndham Brooks), Horror Stories (UK) - January 1952

=== Accepted by Popular Publications ===
- The Black Brain, October 1939
- I Am the Stalker, October 1939
- The Lunatics Stand In, December 1939
- Red Hands Seek Her Body, December 1939
- Death Watches the Calendar, February 1940
- Slaves of the Grey Ghoul, April 1940
- Satan Sends a Beast, May 1940
- All These Must Die, July 1940
- Frankenstein Island, November 1940

=== Rejected by Popular Publications ===
- This Door to Hell, July 1939
- The Doom Beyond the Door, October 1939
- The Corpse Has a Plan, October 1939
- Terror Creeps Behind, October 1939
- The Crimson Vampire, May 1940
- For Peace -- Smoke Your Guns!, October 1941
- Johnson, Rypert and Me, December 1954
- Traitor's Hot Lead Reckoning, ?
- Trouble With Wind, ?

=== Anthologies ===
- Test-Tube Frankenstein, Sensuous Science Fiction from the Weird and Spicy Pulps, ed. Sheldon Jaffery, Bowling Green State University Popular Press, 1984, ISBN 0-87972-305-X, ISBN 0-87972-306-8
- A Beast Is Born, The Weirds, ed. Sheldon Jaffery, Starmont House Inc., 1987, ISBN 0-930261-92-5

=== Unpublished ===
- For Peace -- Smoke Your Guns! (Popular Publications rejection letter dated October 23, 1941)
- Chain of Command (manuscript only, no letter, but envelope addressed to Popular Publications and postmarked December 12, 1954)
- Johnson, Rypert and Me (Argosy rejection letter dated December 23, 1954)
- Booking at Clyde's Fork (manuscript, no letter attached, undated)
- I Bring You Death (manuscript only, no date or letter, written in Sunnyside, WA)
- Is The Ant Willing? (humor, manuscript only, 1950s)
- The Flesh Builders (incomplete)
- The Secret of the Room (manuscript only, no date or letter, written in Yakima, WA)
- Traitor's Hot Lead Reckoning (rejection letter from Popular Publications)
- Trouble With Wind (Yakima Valley farmers struggle against tumbleweed-clogged irrigation canals, submitted to Argosy in the 1950s, rejected, no letter found)

== See also ==
- List of horror fiction writers
