= KCYS =

- Seaside, Oregon; United States
- Broadcast area: Astoria, Oregon
- Frequency: 96.5 MHz
- Branding: C-96

Programming
- Format: Country
- Affiliations: Compass Media Networks

Ownership
- Owner: Jeff Huffman; (Jacobs Radio Programming, LLC)

History
- First air date: 1997 (at 98.1)
- Former frequencies: 98.1 MHz (1997–2012)

Technical information
- Licensing authority: FCC
- Facility ID: 78427
- Class: A
- ERP: 6,000 watts
- HAAT: 100 meters (328 feet)
- Transmitter coordinates: 45°57′11″N 123°56′14″W

Links
- Public license information: Public file; LMS
- Website: c96kcys.com

KCYS (96.5 FM) is a radio station licensed to serve Seaside, Oregon, United States. The station is owned by Jeff Huffman, through licensee Jacobs Radio Programming, LLC. KCYS broadcasts a country music format.

The state of Oregon has designated KCYS as the primary, also called "P-1", provider to Clatsop County of bulletins about weather and other emergencies issued by state agencies and officials.

== History ==
This station received its original construction permit from the Federal Communications Commission on September 5, 1996. The new station was assigned the KCYS call sign by the FCC on November 25, 1996. KCYS received its license to cover from the FCC on April 1, 1998.
