= Clifton Robbins =

English journalist and writer

- Born: 22 October 1890; Brixton, London.
- Died: 9 December 1964 (aged 74); Cambridge
- Education: City of London School
- Alma mater: Queens' College, University of Cambridge
- Occupations: Author and international civil servant
- Known for: Detective fiction
- Spouse: Edith A. Hodgson
- Children: Jeannette Wensley

Clifton Robbins (22 October 1890 – 9 December 1964) was an English journalist, writer of golden age detective fiction in the 1930s, and executive of the International Labour Organization. His stories of amateur detectives involved murder and international drug smuggling and he is best known for his series featuring Clay Harrison, a London barrister turned amateur detective, and his clerk Henry. He worked for the International Labour Organization from 1920, ultimately becoming director of the ILO London office in 1945 before retiring in 1950 to become principal of the Y.M.C.A. College for Adults in Kingsgate, Kent, for eight years.

== Early life and family ==
Clifton Robbins was born in Brixton, London, on 22 October 1890 to Alfred Farthing Robbins, the journalist and writer, and his wife Ellen. He had brothers Alfred G., Alan Pitt, and Grenville, and a sister Helen. He was educated at the City of London School and Queens' College, Cambridge. He became a freemason, like his father and his brother Alan. Robbins married Edith Archer Hodgson (born 3 August 1893 in Camberwell) in Lambeth in 1915 and they had one child, Jeannette (born 1917), who married George Leonard Wensley of the Royal Warwickshire Regiment in 1941. They had three children - John Robin Clifton Wensley, Roger Nicholas Wyckham Wensley and Anthony Kevin Pitt Wensley. Edith died on 10 December 1946.

== Career ==
Robbins joined The Daily Mail in 1913 where he was responsible for the literary page until the outbreak of the First World War. He served in the Admiralty in the Royal Navy Volunteer Reserve during the war as a Paymaster Sub Lieutenant and was awarded the British War Medal. He returned to The Daily Mail where he was briefly the film correspondent. He may have studied for the bar, or been admitted as a barrister. He joined the International Labour Organization (ILO) (founded by the League of Nations) as Assistant Director in 1920 for whom he spent several years in Geneva. In 1931, he broadcast on the BBC about the International Labour Conference. By 1934 he was the deputy director of London office of the ILO. He spent two years on secondment to the Ministry of Information during the Second World War, returning to the ILO in 1942 and became acting director in 1943 and director in 1945. He retired from the ILO in 1950.

At the ILO, Robbins campaigned against unemployment, telling a group of engineering employers at the Waldorf Hotel in 1944 that "full employment" were two "luscious words" and "If you could just ride off on them you would have a cheerful time" but warning that you could not have full employment in one country at the expense of unemployment in another and if there was one man unemployed today it was a danger to everyone who was employed. He praised the passing of the ILO charter in Philadelphia as a development of first rate significance for post-war prosperity.

Robbins was elected a fellow of the Royal Society of Arts in 1951.

Robbins was very active in speaking on behalf of the Young Men's Christian Associations and the Christian Student Movement, and after his retirement from the ILO became principal of the Y.M.C.A. College for Adults in Kingsgate, Kent from 1950 to 1958.

== Writing ==
Robbins' first novel was Dusty Death (1931), the start of a series of five novels featuring Clay Harrison, a London barrister turned amateur detective, and his clerk Henry. In that first novel, an apparent suicide in suburban London leads Harrison to a drugs cartel and ultimately to the League of Nations in Geneva. The title was drawn from a phrase in William Shakespeare's Macbeth. In Death on the Highway, the murder of a tramp on the road leads to the exposure of an international gang.

In 1933, Robbins lectured The Booklovers' Circle on "Censorship of Crime", arguing that the detective novel was here to stay, it being more respectable now than it had been in his youth to be interested in crime, but warned that one must not confuse crime with sin and that the detective novel must not teach people how to commit crime. Robbins' novels were mostly published by Ernest Benn in London and Appleton in New York. They were praised for their intricacy and cleverness but criticised for their length. In 2016, it was announced that Canelo, a digital-only publisher, would begin republishing the Clay Harrison series.

Robbins also wrote two novels featuring Captain George Champion Staveley, an amateur detective who is unable to leave his room due to war injuries but manages to solve cases with the help of his wife and friends in his village. In the first Staveley novel, Six Sign-Post Murder, the death of a play-girl leads to a sinister crime lord and a drug-smuggling rugby player. Among Robbins' other works is The Devil's beacon, a novel about a Mr. Vasco, who is an anti-smoking campaigner and forms the League Against Tobacco which enjoys success due to the support of the owner of the fiction newspaper the Daily Flight before fizzling out. In Murder by 25 in the Thornton Butterworth "Crime Circle" series, a secretary turns amateur detective to solve the mystery of his employer's murder. The dust-jacket was designed by Bip Pares.

The start of the Second World War marked the end of Robbins' literary career and his last novel was the Stavely story Death Forms Threes, published in early 1940 and probably written in 1939.

== Death ==
Robbins died on 9 December 1964. His death was registered in Cambridge, and he left an estate of £7,465 after taxes. He received obituaries in The Times and the Journal of the Royal Society of Arts.

== Selected publications ==
Clay Harrison novels

- Dusty Death. Ernest Benn, London, 1931.
- The Man Without a Face. Ernest Benn, London, 1932. (Published in the United States as The Mystery of Mr. Cross. D. Appleton & Co., New York, 1933.)
- Death on the Highway. Ernest Benn, London, 1933.
- The Clay Harrison Omnibus. Containing Dusty Death, The Man Without a Face, Death on the Highway. Ernest Benn, London, 1933.
- Smash and Grab. Ernest Benn, London, 1934.
- Methylated Murder: A New Clay Harrison Adventure. Thornton Butterworth, London, 1935.

George Staveley novels

- Six Sign-Post Murder. Rich & Cowan, London, 1939.
- Death Forms Threes. Rich & Cowan, London, 1940.

Others

- The Devil's Beacon. Ernest Benn, London, 1933.
- Murder by 25. Thornton Butterworth, London, 1936.
