= Darren Robbins =

American singer

Background information
- Born: Dowagiac, Michigan, United States
- Genres: Rock, new wave, alternative rock
- Occupation: Singer-songwriter
- Years active: 1988–present
- Labels: Like Records (1988–1989); A&M Records (1989–1993); Chequered Requerds (1997–2000); Home Taping Is Killing Music Records (2006–2008)

Darren Robbins (born April 14, 1966) is a singer-songwriter from Chicago, Illinois. Robbins released the seminal power pop CD "Darren Robbins Steals Your Girlfriend" in 1988 with production and musical backing by CBS/Portrait act The Elvis Brothers.

Trouser Press publisher Ira Robbins (no relation) called Robbins' debut effort "as much a showcase for the star’s solid skills as an indication of the Elvis Brothers’ talent, 'Steals Your Girlfriend' is a delight."

Robbins released two CDs under the name Time Bomb Symphony. Most recently, he has released his first CD of new material in seven years under yet another pseudonym, Destroy The Heart. The self-titled CD was produced by Adam Schmitt.

In 2008, Robbins reformed Time Bomb Symphony with former Material Issue members Mike Zelenko and Ted Ansani.

According to a feature in The New York Times, Robbins formed the company Big D Custom Tour Merch in 2011, providing full-service tour merchandising to many major rock acts as well as custom screen printing services.

In 2014, Robbins, now a prolific street artist working under the pseudonym "Lemmy Cornhole", made headlines after his arrest for malicious destruction to a building in his hometown of Dowagiac, Michigan. Charges were later dropped. His hand-made street art-style cornhole boards are now in high demand and sell for upwards of $2,500 on the secondary market.

== Discography ==
- Darren Robbins Steals Your Girlfriend, 1988 (Like Records).
- Time Bomb Symphony/If You See Kay, 1997 (Chequered).
- Time Bomb Symphony/Rules Get Broken, 2000 (Chequered).
- Destroy The Heart/Destroy The Heart, 2007 (Home Taping Is Killing Music Records).
