= Alfred Farthing Robbins =

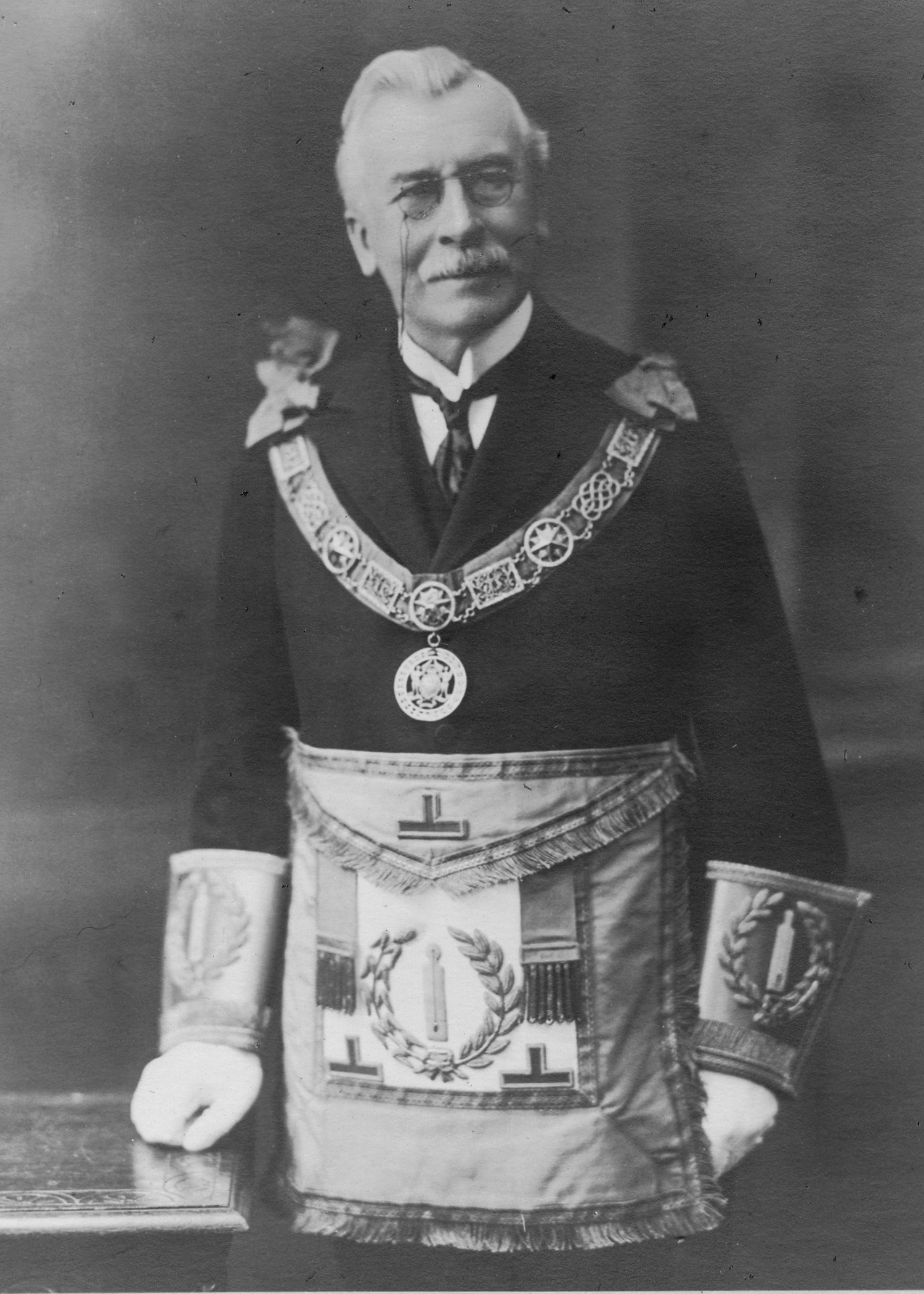
Sir Alfred Farthing Robbins

Sir Alfred Farthing Robbins (Launceston 1 August 1856 - 9 March 1931) was a British journalist, political biographer and freemason.

== Career ==
He was initiated in 1888 in Gallery Lodge No. 1928, which catered for members of the Press Gallery of the House of Commons, and in 1901 became Master of that lodge. As President of the Board of General Purposes from 1913 until his death, he was described as "the Prime Minister of English Freemasonry". London correspondent of the Birmingham Daily Post since 1888, he was president of the Institute of Journalists in 1908, and has been chairman of its Orphan Fund since 1911. He received a knighthood in 1917.

His portrait, painted by Philip Tennyson Cole, presented by the Institute of Journalists in 1931, is kept at Launceston Guildhall and Town Hall. He was a member of the National Liberal Club.

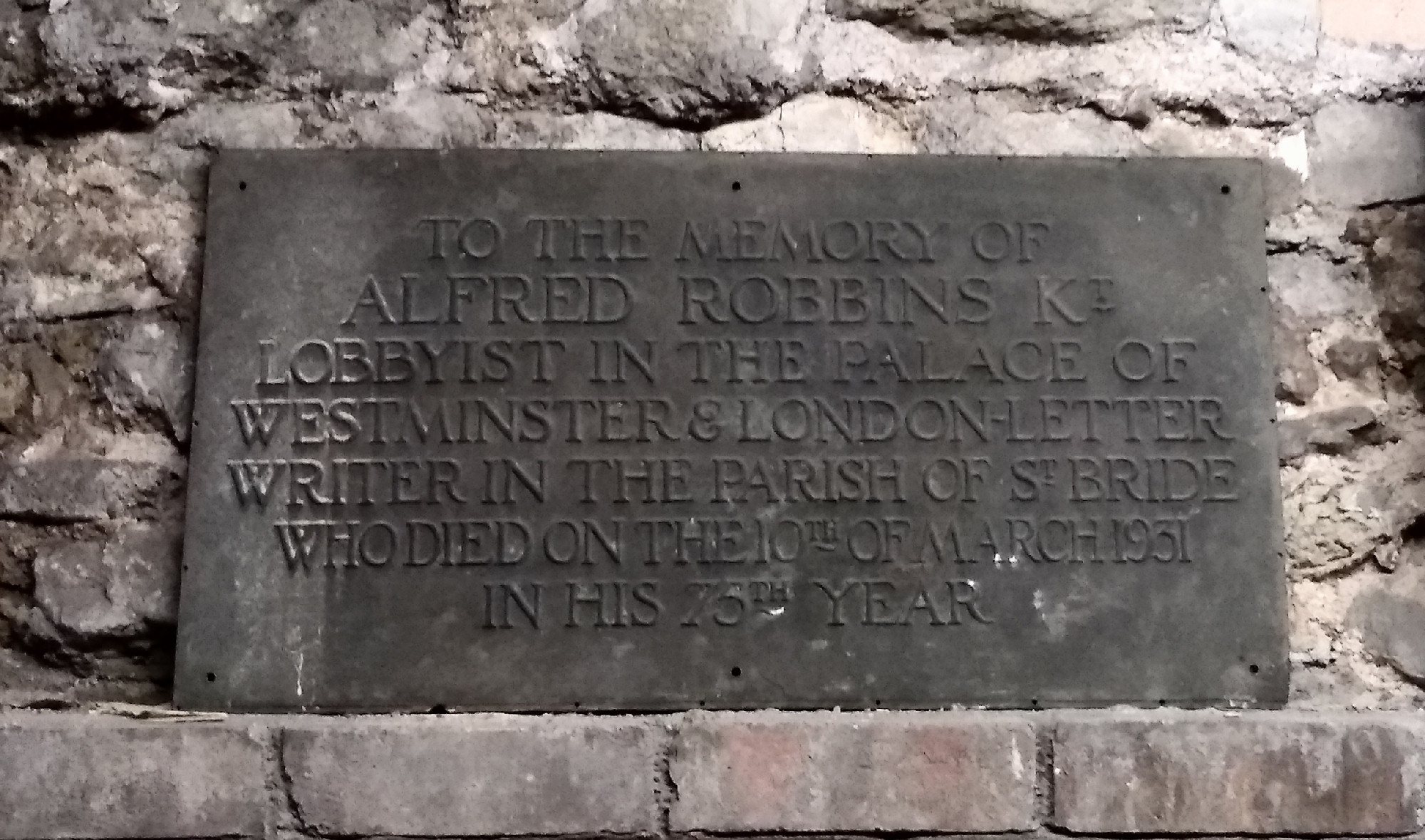
Memorial in St Bride's Church, Fleet Street, London

He married Ellen Pitt (born 1862 in Hitchin) in 1882, and was the father of Alfred Gordon Robbins, Helen Robbins, Alan Pitt Robbins, Grenville Robbins and Clifton Robbins (1890-1964), the journalist, barrister, and writer of golden age detective fiction.

His wife Ellen was the daughter of Ann and John Pitt who ran the White Horse Pub, 19 High St, in Hitchin, Hertfordshire.

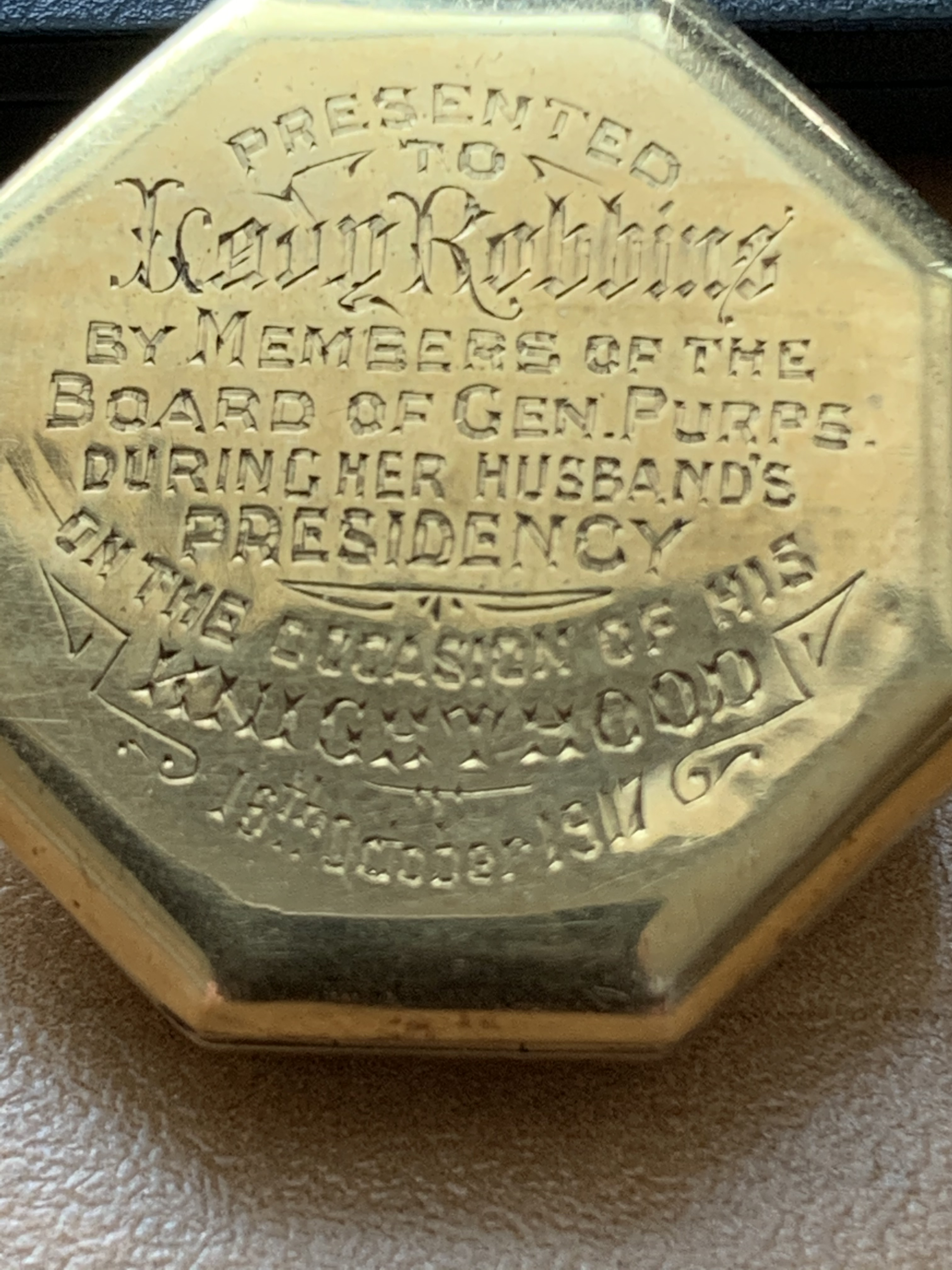
Watch given to his wife Ellen for his knighthood by the Board of General Purposes

== Works ==
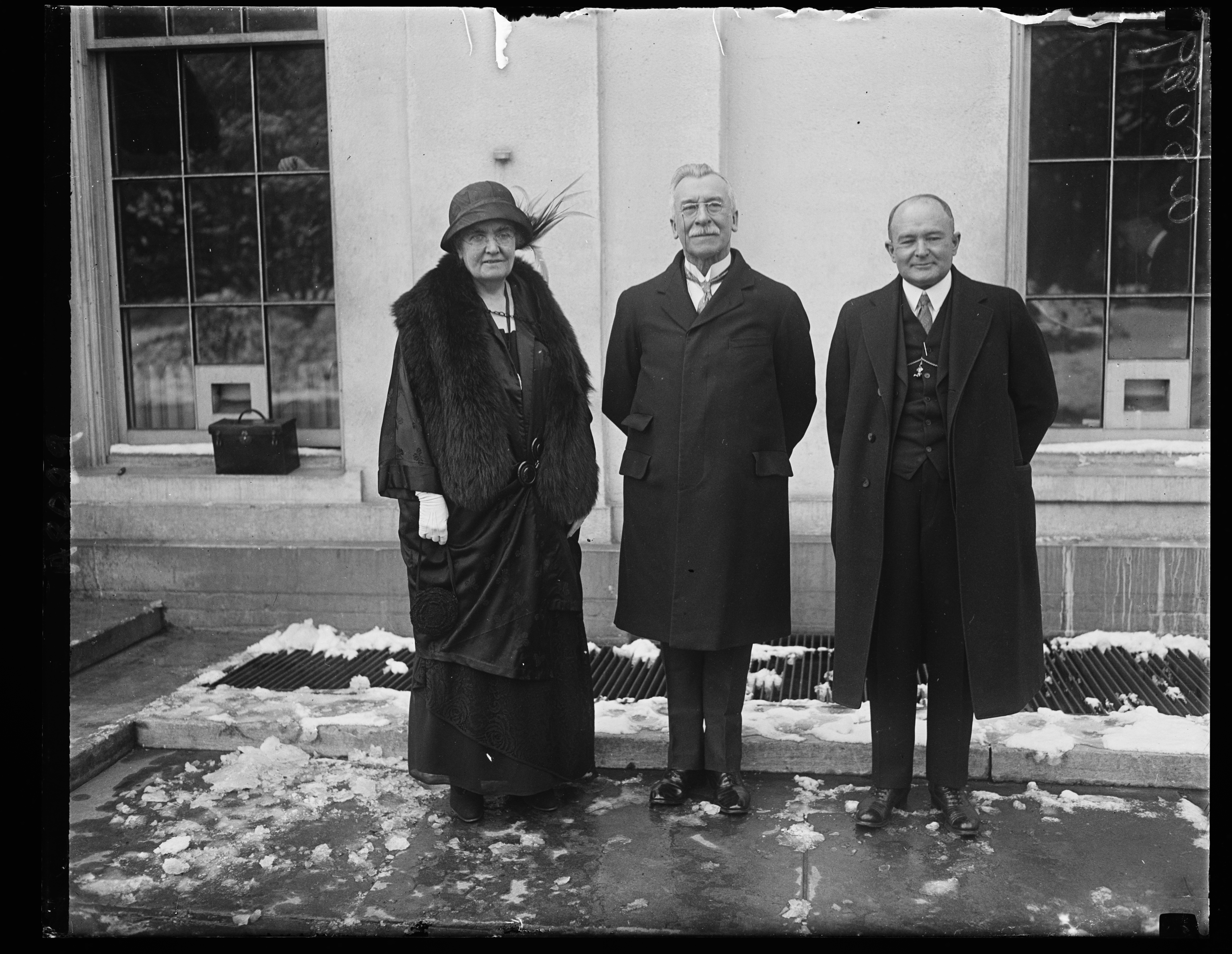
Lady Robbins, Sir Alfred and John H. Cowles

- Five Years of Tory Rule: A Lesson and a Warning (1879)
- "Morice, Humphry" . Dictionary of National Biography. London: Smith, Elder & Co. 1885–1900.
- Practical politics; or, The liberalism of to-day (1888)
- Launceston, Past and Present (1888)
- The early public life of William Ewart Gladstone: four times prime minister (1894)
- English-Speaking Freemasonry (1930)
