= List of places in Alaska (B) =

This list of cities, towns, unincorporated communities, counties, and other recognized places in the U.S. state of Alaska also includes information on the number and names of counties in which the place lies, and its lower and upper zip code bounds, if applicable.

Name of place	Number of counties	Principal county	Lower zip code	Upper zip code
Badger	1	Fairbanks North Star Borough	99711	
Baker	1	Yukon-Koyukuk Census Area		
Baranof	1	City and Borough of Sitka	99833	
Barrow	1	North Slope Borough	99723	
Barrow-Point Hope	1	North Slope Borough		
Barter Island	1	North Slope Borough		
Barter Island DEW Station	1	North Slope Borough	99701	
Bartlett Cove	1	Skagway-Hoonah-Angoon Census Area	99826	
Bear Creek	1	Kenai Peninsula Borough		
Beaver	1	Yukon-Koyukuk Census Area	99724	
Beaverhouse Hill	1	Bethel Census Area		
Beechey Point	1	North Slope Borough		
Belkofski	1	Aleutians East Borough	99612	
Bell Island	1	Prince of Wales-Outer Census Area		
Bell Island Hot Springs	1	Prince of Wales-Outer Census Area	99901	
Beluga	1	Kenai Peninsula Borough		
Berg	1	Yukon-Koyukuk Census Area		
Bering Land Bridge National Monument	2	Nome Census Area	99501	
Bering Land Bridge National Monument	2	Northwest Arctic Borough	99501	
Bering Strait Regional Educational Attendance Area	1	Nome Census Area		
Bering Straits	1	Nome Census Area		
Berry	1	Fairbanks North Star Borough		
Bethel	1	Bethel Census Area	99559	
Bethel Airport	1	Bethel Census Area	99559	
Bettles	1	Yukon-Koyukuk Census Area	99726	
Bettles Field	1	Yukon-Koyukuk Census Area	99726	
Big Delta	1	Southeast Fairbanks Census Area	99737	
Big Horn	1	Fairbanks North Star Borough		
Big Lake	1	Matanuska-Susitna Borough	99652	
Big Mountain Radio Relay Site	1	Dillingham Census Area	99501	
Bill Moores	1	Kusilvak Census Area		
Bill Moore's	1	Kusilvak Census Area		
Biorka	1	Aleutians West Census Area		
Birch Creek	1	Yukon-Koyukuk Census Area	99740	
Birches	1	Yukon-Koyukuk Census Area		
Birch Lake	1	Fairbanks North Star Borough		
Birchwood	1	Municipality of Anchorage		
Bird	1	Municipality of Anchorage		
Bjerremark	1	Fairbanks North Star Borough	99701	
Black	1	Kusilvak Census Area		
Black Dome	1	Nome Census Area		
Bluff	1	Fairbanks North Star Borough		
Bluff	1	Nome Census Area		
Bodenburg Butte	1	Matanuska-Susitna Borough		
Bonibrook	1	Municipality of Anchorage		
Border	1	Southeast Fairbanks Census Area	99780	
Bornite	1	Northwest Arctic Borough		
Boswell Bay	1	Valdez-Cordova Census Area	99574	
Boundary	1	Southeast Fairbanks Census Area	99701	
Brevig Mission	1	Nome Census Area	99785	
Bristol Bay	2	Bristol Bay Borough		
Bristol Bay	2	Dillingham Census Area		
Bristol Bay	1	Bristol Bay Borough		
Bristol Bay Borough School District	1	Bristol Bay Borough		
Broadmoor	1	Fairbanks North Star Borough	99701	
Broad Pass	1	Matanuska-Susitna Borough		
Browerville	1	North Slope Borough	99723	
Browne	1	Yukon-Koyukuk Census Area		
Buckland	1	Northwest Arctic Borough	99727	
Buffalo Soapstone	1	Matanuska-Susitna Borough		
Butte	1	Matanuska-Susitna Borough	99645	
