= Charles Albert Robbins =

American amateur botanist and lichenologist (1874–1930)

- Born: 9 February 1874; Stoughton, Massachusetts
- Died: 22 January 1930 (aged 55)
- Scientific career
- Fields: Botany, lichenology
- Author abbrev. (botany): Robbins

Charles Albert Robbins (February 9, 1874 – January 22, 1930) was an American amateur botanist and lichenologist, known for his extensive work on the genus Cladonia. Despite lacking formal scientific training, Robbins made contributions to the field of botany, particularly in the study of lichens.

== Life and career ==
Born on February 9, 1874, in Stoughton, Massachusetts, Robbins was the son of Charles Orlando and Rosella Robbins. After receiving a primary school education, he entered the grocery business. In the early 1890s, he moved to Onset, a summer resort area in Wareham, Massachusetts, where he spent the remainder of his life. For nearly three decades, Robbins operated a grocery and provision business in partnership with Arthur B. Hammond.

Robbins developed an interest in natural history around the age of 30, initially focusing on ornithology. His passion for botany, particularly the study of lichens, emerged later in life. By 1915, he began seriously collecting lichens, with a growing emphasis on the genus Cladonia.

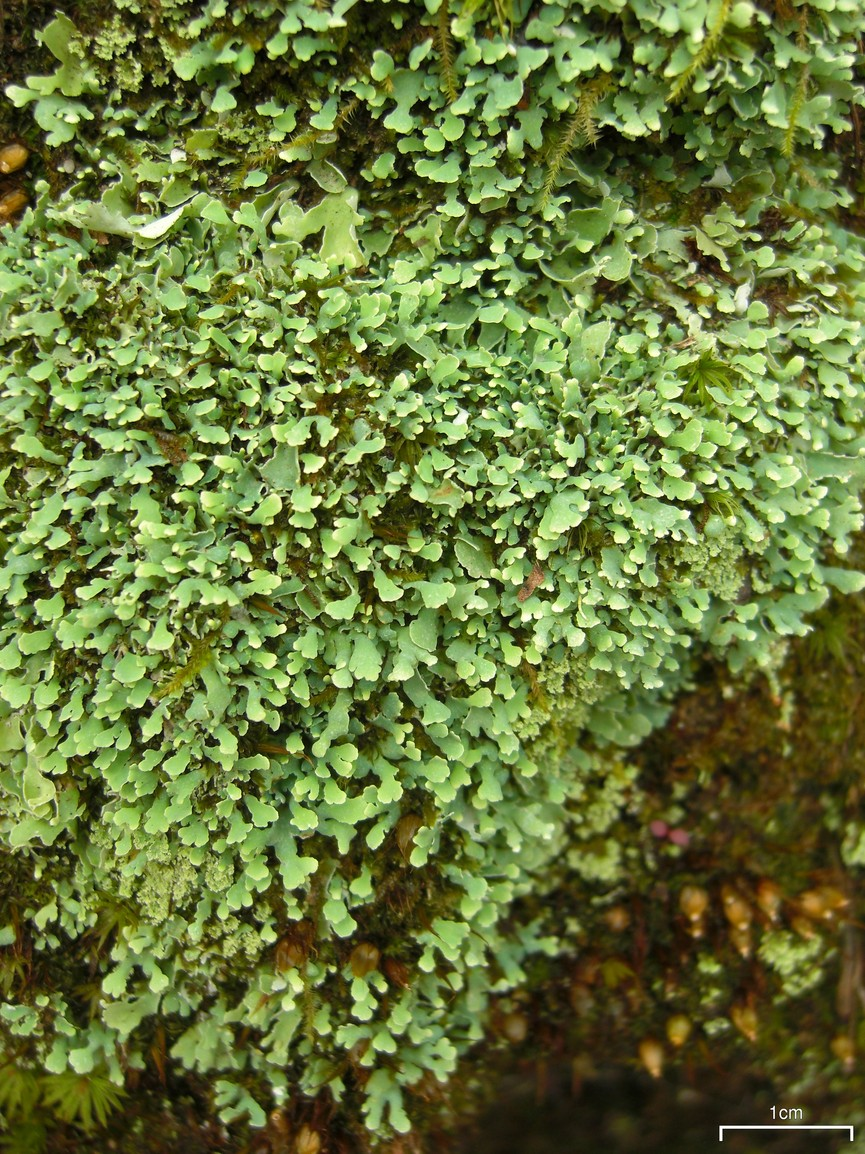
Cladonia apodocarpa was described by Robbins in 1925.

Despite his lack of formal training, Robbins became recognized as one of America's foremost experts on Cladonia. His work included:

- Assembling what was likely the largest private collection of Cladonia in the United States at the time.
- Describing three new species and numerous forms of Cladonia.
- Collaborating with prominent lichenologists, including Alexander William Evans and Heinrich Sandstede.
- Contributing specimens to Sandstede's exsiccata series, Cladoniae exsiccatae.

Robbins conducted extensive field studies in the Wareham area, documenting approximately 46 species of Cladonia in the region. He was known for his meticulous approach to specimen collection and identification.

In addition to his work on lichens, Robbins studied flowering plants, with a particular focus on asters and goldenrods. He discovered several previously undocumented plant populations in Massachusetts, including Aster concolor and Luzula campestris var. acadiensis.

== Personal life and legacy ==
Robbins married Nellie Barnard of Onset in 1897. He died on January 22, 1930, shortly after retiring from his business. His Cladonia herbarium was donated to the Farlow Herbarium at Harvard University, with some materials going to Yale University. In 1972, Lawrence Mish recorded a list of the Cladonias of southeastern Massachusetts, making special reference to Robbin's collection; the publication cites 116 taxa and their distribution. Two of his personal daily diaries that he kept from the ages of 13 through 15 (1886–1888) are housed at the University of Michigan library,

Although his death prevented the completion of his planned treatment of Cladonia in New England, Robbins' work significantly advanced the understanding of this genus in North America. According to Sidney Fay Blake, Robbins exemplified the important contributions that dedicated amateur botanists can make to scientific knowledge. Alexander William Evans dedicated the species Cladonia robbinsii in his honor in 1944.

== Selected publications ==
- Robbins, C.A. (1919). "A colony of Cape Cod piping plover". Auk. 36 (3): 351–355. doi:10.2307/4073103.
- Robbins, C.A. (1924). "Some new Cladonias". Rhodora. 26 (307): 145–148. JSTOR 23298179.
- Robbins, C.A.; Blake, S.F. (1931). "Cladonia in the District of Columbia and vicinity". Rhodora. 33 (391): 145–159. JSTOR 23300745.
- Robbins, C.A. (1932). "The advantage of crossed mandibles: a note on the American red crossbill". Auk. 49 (2): 159–165. doi:10.2307/4077027. JSTOR 4077027.
