= Richard Robbins (anthropologist) =

American anthropologist

Richard Howard Robbins (born 30 March 1940) is a Distinguished Teaching Professor of anthropology at the State University of New York at Plattsburgh.

== Education ==
He received a Bachelor of Arts in psychology from Rutgers University, a Master of Arts in anthropology from New York University, and a Ph.D. in anthropology from the University of North Carolina, Chapel Hill.

== Awards and honors ==
- 2005: American Anthropological Association AAA/McGraw-Hill Teacher of the Year Award
- 2002: SUNY Distinguished Teaching Professor
- 1977: SUNY Chancellor's Award for Excellence in Teaching

== Selected publications ==
- 2012: Cultural Anthropology: A Problem Based Approach (6th edition), Cengage Publishers
- 2012: Neoliberalism, Race and Racism. In: Encyclopedia of Race and Racism, 2nd edition. Edited by Patrick Mason. Cengage Publishers
- 2009: Anthropologizing Economics: Lessons from the Latest Crisis, Anthropology News, 50:11-12
- 2009: Darwin and the Bible: The Cultural Confrontation. Edited (with Mark Nathan Cohen). Allyn & Bacon Publishers
- 2005: Global Problems and the Culture of Capitalism (3rd Edition), Allyn & Bacon, Publishers, Boston, Mass.
- 2005: The History of Technology: The Western Tradition. In: Sal Restivo (Eds.): The Oxford Encyclopedia of Science, Technology and Society, Oxford University Press
- 1999: Ethnic Violence and the Question of Political Sovereignty. In: Richard Deutsch (Eds:) Perspectives Anthropology, Coursewise Publishing Inc., St. Paul, MN
- 1988: The Belief Machine. Published on the web at https://web.archive.org/web/20130819082116/http://faculty.plattsburgh.edu/richard.robbins/belief/belief-machine.htm
- 1975: Canadian Native Peoples: A Review, The American Review of Canadian Studies, Volume 1, #5
- 1969: Economic Change and Ecological Adaptation among the Schefferville Naskapi. McGill Subarctic Research Laboratory Reports, Volume 4

=== Online ===
- 1996–present: Global Problems and the Culture of Capitalism, A multi-purpose site that includes, among other things, course material, an Internet course, support materials for the Global Problems and the Culture of Capitalism, a "global update" feature, and an extensive collection of links to Internet resources on global issues.
