= List of Doc Savage novels =

Doc Savage
- Doc Savage Magazine, March 1933, "The Man of Bronze", illustrated by Walter M. Baumhofer.

This is a comprehensive list of the books written about the fictional character Doc Savage originally published in American pulp magazines during the 1930s and 1940s. He was created by publisher Henry W. Ralston and editor John L. Nanovic at Street & Smith Publications, with additional material contributed by the series' main writer, Lester Dent. The illustrations were by Walter Baumhofer, Paul Orban, Emery Clarke, Modest Stein, and Robert G. Harris.

== Description ==
Doc Savage stories, 181 in total, first appeared in Conde Nast's Doc Savage Magazine pulps. The original series has sold over 20 million copies in paperback form. The first entry was The Man of Bronze, in March, 1933 from the house name "Kenneth Robeson". John L. Nanovic was editor for 10 years, and planned and approved all story outlines. The early stories were pure pulp "supersagas", as dubbed by Philip José Farmer, with rampaging dinosaurs and lost races, secret societies led by dastardly villains, fantastic gadgets and weapons, autogyros and zeppelins, death-dealing traps and hair-raising escapes, and plots to rule the earth. In the first few stories, Doc and his aides killed enemies without compunction. An editorial decision made them kill only when necessary for a more adventurous kid-friendly magazine, unlike the bloodthirsty competitor The Shadow.

Doc Savage was the lead story, often illustrated with line drawings. Exciting covers were painted in bold colors by Walter M. Baumhofer. Other adventure stories filled up the back, and there was a letters column. Kids could join the Doc Savage Club complete with badge, or follow "The Doc Savage Method Of Self-development" to build muscle and memory. In Depression America, 10-cent pulps with hundred of pages were handed around barracks or bunkhouses or schoolyards, a popular form of entertainment when people were unemployed and poor, and fantastic stories were a pleasant diversion from real life. Lester Dent wrote most of the stories, with fill-ins by Harold A. Davis, Alan Hathway, and William Bogart that were overseen or rewritten by Dent.

By 1938, as the economy improved, pulps were on the wane and faced competition from comic books. During World War II, ordinary men and women performed fantastic deeds daily in exotic corners of the world, and fantastic pulp adventures seemed childish. Charles Moran became editor in 1943 and changed the format to suspense and realism. Doc used fewer gadgets and standard detective tropes. By 1946, in Measures for a Coffin, Doc is busting crooked investment bankers. Doc pared down his team, working mainly with Monk and Ham, and sometimes alone. Successive editors carried this format, and Babette Rosmond retitled the magazine Doc Savage, Science Detective in 1947.

By this time, the Doc stories were shorter than other stories in the magazine. Covers rarely showed Doc anymore, becoming detective-generic, abstract or illustrating non-Doc stories. Dent may have recycled some generic detective stories as Doc tales; King Joe Cay features Doc working alone, in disguise, with no aides, gadgets, or headquarters, and an interest in the ladies. Alan Hathway's grisly The Mindless Monsters reads like a rejected Spider story. Experimenting with new formats, during 1947 Dent wrote five stories with a first-person narrator, an innocent person caught up in a Doc Savage adventure, with one story narrated by Pat Savage, I Died Yesterday. Sales continued to fall.

The magazine went bi-monthly in 1947, then quarterly in 1949. Editor William de Grouchy was brought back to revive the magazine, and asked Dent to return to larger-than-life stories. Dent took a new direction, with Doc infiltrating Russia and outwitting "the Ivans". This story, eventually titled The Red Spider in the Bantam run, was killed and shelved by editor Daisy Bacon. She oversaw three pulp-style adventures for the last three issues, but the magazine was cancelled in 1949. In the last story, Up from Earth's Center, Doc delves into a cave in Maine and meets what may be actual demons, and runs screaming in terror. The saga had ended.

Into 1964 Bantam Books reprinted the original stories in paperback. A huge selling point were the striking photo-realistic covers of a vibrant, widow-peaked, shredded-shirted Doc painted by James Bama and later Bob Larkin, Boris Vallejo, and others. Bantam reprinted all the stories, concluding in 1990, but not in the original publication order, and retitling a few stories. The earlier volumes printed a single story; as the stories got shorter, Bantam combined double novels, and finally Doc Savage Omnibuses containing four or five stories. The rejected The Red Spider manuscript was discovered in 1975 by Will Murray and published during the Bantam Books print run as #95.

In recent years, Anthony Tollin's Sanctum Books, initially in association with Nostalgia Ventures for the first 16 releases, has reprinted all 182 (including the initially unpublished The Red Spider) of the Doc Savage stories from the thirties and forties, usually at least two to a volume, using Baumhofer covers, and some Bama covers for variant editions. The reprint project, 87 volumes in total, was completed in 2016.

== Doc Savage Magazine (1933) ==
Year	Month	Title / Bantam Retitle	Series #	Author	Cover Artist	Cast
1933	Mar	The Man of Bronze	1	Lester Dent	Walter M. Baumhofer	Doc, Monk, Ham, Renny, Johnny, Long Tom
1933	Apr	The Land of Terror	2	Lester Dent	Walter M. Baumhofer	Doc, Monk, Ham, Renny, Johnny, Long Tom
1933	May	Quest of the Spider	3	Lester Dent	Walter M. Baumhofer	Doc, Monk, Ham, Renny, Johnny, Long Tom
1933	Jun	The Polar Treasure	4	Lester Dent	Walter M. Baumhofer	Doc, Monk, Ham, Renny, Johnny, Long Tom
1933	Jul	Pirate of the Pacific	5	Lester Dent	Walter M. Baumhofer	Doc, Monk, Ham, Renny, Johnny, Long Tom
1933	Aug	The Red Skull	6	Lester Dent	Walter M. Baumhofer	Doc, Monk, Ham, Renny, Johnny, Long Tom
1933	Sep	The Lost Oasis	7	Lester Dent	Walter M. Baumhofer	Doc, Monk, Ham, Renny, Johnny, Long Tom
1933	Oct	The Sargasso Ogre	8	Lester Dent	Walter M. Baumhofer	Doc, Monk, Ham, Renny, Johnny, Long Tom
1933	Nov	The Czar of Fear	9	Lester Dent	Walter M. Baumhofer	Doc, Monk, Ham, Renny, Johnny, Long Tom
1933	Dec	The Phantom City	10	Lester Dent	Walter M. Baumhofer	Doc, Monk, Ham, Renny, Johnny, Long Tom, Habeas Corpus
1934	Jan	Brand of the Werewolf	11	Lester Dent	Walter M. Baumhofer	Doc, Monk, Ham, Renny, Johnny, Long Tom, Pat
1934	Feb	The Man Who Shook the Earth	12	Lester Dent	Walter M. Baumhofer	Doc, Monk, Ham, Renny, Johnny, Long Tom
1934	Mar	Meteor Menace	13	Lester Dent	Walter M. Baumhofer	Doc, Monk, Ham, Renny, Johnny, Long Tom
1934	Apr	The Monsters	14	Lester Dent	Walter M. Baumhofer	Doc, Monk, Ham, Renny, Johnny, Long Tom
1934	May	The Mystery on the Snow	15	Lester Dent	Walter M. Baumhofer	Doc, Monk, Ham, Renny, Johnny, Long Tom
1934	Jun	The King Maker	16	Lester Dent / Harold A. Davis	Walter M. Baumhofer	Doc, Monk, Ham, Renny, Johnny, Long Tom
1934	Jul	The Thousand-Headed Man	17	Lester Dent	Walter M. Baumhofer	Doc, Monk, Ham, Renny, Johnny, Long Tom
1934	Aug	The Squeaking Goblin	18	Lester Dent	Walter M. Baumhofer	Doc, Monk, Ham, Renny, Johnny, Long Tom
1934	Sep	Fear Cay	19	Lester Dent	Walter M. Baumhofer	Doc, Monk, Ham, Renny, Johnny, Long Tom, Pat
1934	Oct	Death in Silver	20	Lester Dent	Walter M. Baumhofer	Doc, Monk, Ham, Renny, Pat
1934	Nov	The Sea Magician	21	Lester Dent	Walter M. Baumhofer	Doc, Monk, Ham, Johnny
1934	Dec	The Annihilist	22	Lester Dent	Walter M. Baumhofer	Doc, Monk, Ham, Renny, Pat
1935	Jan	The Mystic Mullah	23	Lester Dent / Richard Sale	Walter M. Baumhofer	Doc, Monk, Ham, Renny, Johnny, Long Tom
1935	Feb	Red Snow	24	Lester Dent	Walter M. Baumhofer	Doc, Monk, Ham, Pat (phone call)
1935	Mar	Land of Always-Night	25	Lester Dent / W. Ryerson Johnson	Walter M. Baumhofer	Doc, Monk, Ham, Renny, Johnny, Long Tom
1935	Apr	The Spook Legion	26	Lester Dent	Walter M. Baumhofer	Doc, Monk, Ham
1935	May	The Secret in the Sky	27	Lester Dent	Walter M. Baumhofer	Doc, Monk, Ham, Renny, Johnny, Long Tom
1935	Jun	The Roar Devil	28	Lester Dent	Walter M. Baumhofer	Doc, Monk, Ham, Renny, Johnny
1935	Jul	Quest of Qui	29	Lester Dent	Walter M. Baumhofer	Doc, Monk, Ham, Renny, Johnny
1935	Aug	Spook Hole	30	Lester Dent	Walter M. Baumhofer	Doc, Monk, Ham, Johnny, (Long Tom,) Pat
1935	Sep	The Majii	31	Lester Dent / J. Allan Dunn	Walter M. Baumhofer	Doc, Monk, Ham, Long Tom
1935	Oct	Dust of Death	32	Lester Dent / Harold A. Davis	Walter M. Baumhofer	Doc, Monk, Ham, Long Tom, Habeas Corpus, Chemistry
1935	Nov	Murder Melody	33	Lawrence Donovan	Walter M. Baumhofer	Doc, Monk, Ham, Renny, Johnny, Long Tom
1935	Dec	The Fantastic Island	34	Lester Dent / W. Ryerson Johnson	Walter M. Baumhofer	Doc, Monk, Ham, Renny, Johnny, Long Tom, Pat
1936	Jan	Murder Mirage	35	Lawrence Donovan	Walter M. Baumhofer	Doc, Monk, Ham, Renny, Johnny, Long Tom, Pat
1936	Feb	Mystery Under the Sea	36	Lester Dent	Walter M. Baumhofer	Doc, Monk, Ham, Renny
1936	Mar	The Metal Master	37	Lester Dent	Walter M. Baumhofer	Doc, Monk, Ham, (Renny, Long Tom)
1936	Apr	The Men Who Smiled No More	38	Lawrence Donovan	Walter M. Baumhofer	Doc, Monk, Ham, Renny, Johnny, Long Tom, Pat
1936	May	The Seven Agate Devils	39	Lester Dent / Martin E. Baker	Walter M. Baumhofer	Doc, Monk, Ham
1936	Jun	Haunted Ocean	40	Lawrence Donovan	Walter M. Baumhofer	Doc, Monk, Ham, Renny, Johnny, Long Tom
1936	Jul	The Black Spot	41	Lawrence Donovan	Walter M. Baumhofer	Doc, Monk, Ham, Renny, Johnny, Long Tom, Pat
1936	Aug	The Midas Man	42	Lester Dent	Walter M. Baumhofer	Doc, Monk, Ham, Johnny
1936	Sep	Cold Death	43	Lawrence Donovan	Walter M. Baumhofer	Doc, Monk, Ham, Renny, Long Tom
1936	Oct	The South Pole Terror	44	Lester Dent	John Philip Falter	Doc, Monk, Ham, Renny, Johnny, Long Tom
1936	Nov	Resurrection Day	45	Lester Dent	Robert George Harris	Doc, Monk, Ham, Renny, Johnny, Long Tom
1936	Dec	The Vanisher	46	Lester Dent	Robert George Harris	Doc, Monk, Ham
1937	Jan	Land of Long Juju / Land of Long Ju Ju	47	Lawrence Donovan	Robert George Harris	Doc, Monk, Ham, (Renny,) Johnny, Pat
1937	Feb	The Derrick Devil	48	Lester Dent	Robert George Harris	Doc, Monk, Ham, Renny, Johnny, Long Tom
1937	Mar	The Mental Wizard	49	Lester Dent	Robert George Harris	Doc, Monk, Ham, Renny, Johnny, Long Tom
1937	Apr	The Terror in the Navy	50	Lester Dent	Robert George Harris	Doc, Monk, Ham, Renny, Johnny, Long Tom, Pat
1937	May	Mad Eyes	51	Lawrence Donovan	Robert George Harris	Doc, Monk, Ham, Renny, Johnny, Long Tom
1937	Jun	The Land of Fear	52	Lester Dent / Harold A. Davis	Robert George Harris	Doc, Monk, Ham
1937	Jul	He Could Stop The World	53	Lawrence Donovan	Robert George Harris	Doc, Monk, Ham, Johnny, Long Tom, Pat
1937	Aug	Ost / The Magic Island	54	Lester Dent	Robert George Harris	Doc, Monk, Ham, Renny, Johnny, Long Tom
1937	Sep	The Feathered Octopus	55	Lester Dent	Robert George Harris	Doc, Monk, Ham, (Renny, Johnny, Long Tom,) Pat
1937	Oct	Repel / The Deadly Dwarf	56	Lester Dent	Robert George Harris	Doc, Monk, Ham, (Renny, Johnny, Long Tom)
1937	Nov	The Sea Angel	57	Lester Dent	Robert George Harris	Doc, Monk, Ham, Renny, Johnny, Long Tom
1937	Dec	The Golden Peril	58	Lester Dent / Harold A. Davis	Robert George Harris	Doc, Monk, Ham, (Renny, Johnny,) Long Tom
1938	Jan	The Living-fire Menace / The Living Fire Menace	59	Lester Dent / Harold A. Davis	Emery Clarke	Doc, Monk, Ham, Renny, Johnny, Long Tom
1938	Feb	The Mountain Monster	60	Lester Dent / Harold A. Davis	Harold Winfield Scott	Doc, Monk, Ham, Long Tom
1938	Mar	Devil on the Moon	61	Lester Dent	Emery Clarke	Doc, Monk, Ham, Renny, Johnny, Long Tom, Pat
1938	Apr	The Pirate's Ghost	62	Lester Dent	Emery Clarke	Doc, Monk, Ham, Renny, Johnny, Long Tom
1938	May	The Motion Menace	63	Lester Dent / W. Ryerson Johnson	Emery Clarke	Doc, Monk, Ham, Long Tom
1938	Jun	The Submarine Mystery	64	Lester Dent	Emery Clarke	Doc, Monk, Ham
1938	Jul	The Giggling Ghosts	65	Lester Dent	Emery Clarke	Doc, Monk, Ham, Renny, Johnny, Long Tom
1938	Aug	The Munitions Master	66	Harold A. Davis	Emery Clarke	Doc, Monk, Ham, Long Tom
1938	Sep	The Red Terrors	67	Harold A. Davis	Emery Clarke	Doc, Monk, Ham, Renny, Johnny, Long Tom
1938	Oct	Fortress of Solitude	68	Lester Dent	Emery Clarke	Doc, Monk, Ham, Long Tom
1938	Nov	The Green Death	69	Harold A. Davis	Emery Clarke	Doc, Monk, Ham, Renny, Johnny
1938	Dec	The Devil Genghis	70	Lester Dent	Emery Clarke	Doc, Monk, Ham, (Renny, Johnny)
1939	Jan	Mad Mesa	71	Lester Dent	Emery Clarke	Doc, Monk, Ham, Renny, Johnny, Long Tom
1939	Feb	The Yellow Cloud	72	Lester Dent / Evelyn Coulson	Emery Clarke	Doc, Monk, Ham, Renny, Long Tom, Pat
1939	Mar	The Freckled Shark	73	Lester Dent	Emery Clarke	Doc, Monk, Ham, Johnny
1939	Apr	World's Fair Goblin	74	Lester Dent / William G. Bogart	Emery Clarke	Doc, Monk, Ham, Long Tom, Pat
1939	May	The Gold Ogre	75	Lester Dent	Emery Clarke	Doc, Monk, Ham
1939	Jun	The Flaming Falcons	76	Lester Dent	Emery Clarke	Doc, Monk, Ham
1939	Jul	Merchants of Disaster	77	Harold A. Davis	Emery Clarke	Doc, Monk, Ham, Renny, (Johnny, Long Tom)
1939	Aug	The Crimson Serpent	78	Harold A. Davis	Emery Clarke	Doc, Monk, Ham, (Renny)
1939	Sep	Poison Island	79	Lester Dent	Emery Clarke	Doc, Monk, Ham, Renny, Johnny, Pat
1939	Oct	The Stone Man	80	Lester Dent	Emery Clarke	Doc, Monk, Ham, Renny, Long Tom
1939	Nov	Hex	81	Lester Dent / William G. Bogart	Emery Clarke	Doc, Monk, Ham, (Renny,) Johnny, Pat
1939	Dec	The Dagger in the Sky	82	Lester Dent	Emery Clarke	Doc, Monk, Ham, Renny, Johnny, Long Tom
1940	Jan	The Other World	83	Lester Dent	Emery Clarke	Doc, Monk, Ham, Renny, Johnny, Long Tom
1940	Feb	The Angry Ghost	84	Lester Dent / William G. Bogart	Emery Clarke	Doc, Monk, Ham, Renny, Johnny, Long Tom
1940	Mar	The Spotted Men	85	Lester Dent / William G. Bogart	Emery Clarke	Doc, Monk, Ham, Renny, (Johnny, Long Tom,) Pat
1940	Apr	The Evil Gnome	86	Lester Dent	Emery Clarke	Doc, Monk, Ham, Renny, (Johnny)
1940	May	The Boss of Terror	87	Lester Dent	Emery Clarke	Doc, Monk, Ham, Long Tom
1940	Jun	The Awful Egg	88	Lester Dent	Emery Clarke	Doc, Monk, Ham, Renny, (Johnny,) Long Tom
1940	Jul	The Flying Goblin	89	William G. Bogart	Emery Clarke	Doc, Monk, Ham, (Renny, Johnny,) Long Tom
1940	Aug	Tunnel Terror	90	William G. Bogart	Emery Clarke	Doc, Monk, Ham, Renny
1940	Sep	The Purple Dragon	91	Lester Dent / Harold A. Davis	Emery Clarke	Doc, Monk, Ham, Renny
1940	Oct	Devils of the Deep	92	Harold A. Davis	Emery Clarke	Doc, Monk, Ham, Renny, (Johnny,) Long Tom
1940	Nov	The Awful Dynasty	93	William G. Bogart	Emery Clarke	Doc, Monk, Ham, Renny, (Johnny,) Long Tom, Pat
1940	Dec	The Men Vanished	94	Lester Dent	Emery Clarke	Doc, Monk, Ham, Johnny, Pat
1941	Jan	The Devil's Playground	95	Alan Hathway	Emery Clarke	Doc, Monk, Ham, Renny, Johnny, Long Tom
1941	Feb	Bequest of Evil	96	William G. Bogart	Emery Clarke	Doc, Monk, Ham, Renny, Long Tom
1941	Mar	The All-White Elf	97	Lester Dent	Emery Clarke	Doc, Monk, Ham, Renny, Johnny
1941	Apr	The Golden Man	98	Lester Dent	Emery Clarke	Doc, (Monk, Ham,) Renny, Johnny, Long Tom
1941	May	The Pink Lady	99	Lester Dent	Emery Clarke	Doc, Monk, Ham, Renny, Johnny, Long Tom
1941	Jun	The Headless Men	100	Alan Hathway	Emery Clarke	Doc, Monk, Ham, Renny, Long Tom
1941	Jul	The Green Eagle	101	Lester Dent	Emery Clarke	Doc, Monk, Ham, Renny, Johnny, Long Tom
1941	Aug	Mystery Island	102	Lester Dent	Emery Clarke	Doc, Monk, Ham, Renny, Johnny, Long Tom
1941	Sep	The Mindless Monsters	103	Alan Hathway	Emery Clarke	Doc, Monk, Ham, Renny, (Johnny,) Long Tom
1941	Oct	Birds of Death	104	Lester Dent	Emery Clarke	Doc, Monk, Ham, Renny, Johnny, Long Tom, Pat
1941	Nov	The Invisible Box Murders / The Invisible-Box Murders	105	Lester Dent	Emery Clarke	Doc, Monk, Ham, Renny, Johnny, Long Tom, Pat
1941	Dec	Peril in the North	106	Lester Dent	Emery Clarke	Doc, Monk, Ham, Renny, Johnny, Long Tom
1942	Jan	The Rustling Death	107	Alan Hathway	Emery Clarke	Doc, Monk, Ham, Renny, Johnny, Long Tom
1942	Feb	Men of Fear	108	Lester Dent / Evelyn Coulson	Emery Clarke	Doc, Monk, Ham, Renny, Johnny, Long Tom, Pat
1942	Mar	The Too-Wise Owl	109	Lester Dent	Emery Clarke	Doc, Monk, Ham, Renny, Johnny, Long Tom
1942	Apr	The Magic Forest	110	Lester Dent / William G. Bogart	Emery Clarke	Doc, Monk, Ham, Renny, (Johnny,) Long Tom
1942	May	Pirate Isle	111	Lester Dent	Emery Clarke	Doc, Renny, Johnny, Long Tom
1942	Jun	The Speaking Stone	112	Lester Dent	Emery Clarke	Doc, (Monk, Ham,) Renny, Johnny, Long Tom
1942	Jul	The Man Who Fell Up	113	Lester Dent	Charles deFeo	Doc, Monk, Ham, (Renny, Johnny, Long Tom,) Pat
1942	Aug	The Three Wild Men	114	Lester Dent	Emery Clarke	Doc, Monk, Ham
1942	Sep	The Fiery Menace	115	Lester Dent	Emery Clarke	Doc, Monk, Ham, Long Tom, Pat
1942	Oct	The Laugh of Death	116	Lester Dent	Emery Clarke	Doc, Monk, (Ham, Renny, Johnny, Long Tom,) Pat
1942	Nov	They Died Twice	117	Lester Dent	Emery Clarke	Doc, Monk, Ham, Renny, Johnny, Long Tom
1942	Dec	The Devil's Black Rock	118	Lester Dent	Emery Clarke	Doc, Monk, Ham, Renny, Johnny, Long Tom
1943	Jan	The Time Terror	119	Lester Dent	Emery Clarke	Doc, Monk, Ham, Johnny, Pat
1943	Feb	Waves of Death	120	Lester Dent	Emery Clarke	Doc, Monk, Ham, Renny, Johnny, Long Tom, Pat
1943	Mar	The Black, Black Witch	121	Lester Dent	Emery Clarke	Doc, Monk, Ham, Johnny, Pat
1943	Apr	The King of Terror	122	Lester Dent	Emery Clarke	Doc, Monk, Ham
1943	May	The Talking Devil	123	Lester Dent	Emery Clarke	Doc, Monk, Ham, Renny, Long Tom
1943	Jun	The Running Skeletons	124	Lester Dent	Emery Clarke	Doc, Monk, Ham, Renny, Johnny, (Long Tom)
1943	Jul	Mystery on Happy Bones	125	Lester Dent	Emery Clarke	Doc, Monk, Ham, Renny, Johnny
1943	Aug	The Mental Monster	126	Lester Dent	Emery Clarke	Doc, Monk, Ham, Johnny, Long Tom, Pat
1943	Sep	Hell Below	127	Lester Dent	Modest Stein	Doc, Monk, Ham, Renny, Johnny, Long Tom, Pat
1943	Oct	The Goblins	128	Lester Dent	Modest Stein	Doc, Monk, Ham
1943	Nov	The Secret of the Su	129	Lester Dent	Modest Stein.	Doc, Monk, Ham, Renny, Johnny, Long Tom
1943	Dec	The Spook of Grandpa Eben	130	Lester Dent	Modest Stein	Doc, Monk, Ham, Pat
1944	Jan	According to Plan of a One-Eyed Mystic / One-Eyed Mystic	131	Lester Dent	Modest Stein	Doc, Monk, Ham, Renny
1944	Feb	Death Had Yellow Eyes	132	Lester Dent	Modest Stein	Doc, Monk, Ham, Johnny
1944	Mar	The Derelict of Skull Shoal	133	Lester Dent	Modest Stein	Doc, Monk, Ham, Renny
1944	Apr	The Whisker of Hercules	134	Lester Dent	Modest Stein	Doc, Monk, Ham, Renny, Johnny, Long Tom
1944	May	The Three Devils	135	Lester Dent	Modest Stein	Doc, Monk, Ham, Renny, Johnny
1944	Jun	The Pharaoh's Ghost	136	Lester Dent	Modest Stein	Doc, Monk, Ham, (Johnny,) Long Tom
1944	Jul	The Man Who Was Scared	137	Lester Dent	Modest Stein	Doc, Monk, Ham
1944	Aug	The Shape of Terror	138	Lester Dent	Modest Stein	Doc, Monk, Ham
1944	Sep	Weird Valley	139	Lester Dent	Modest Stein	Doc, Monk, Ham
1944	Oct	Jiu San	140	Lester Dent	Modest Stein	Doc, Monk, Ham
1944	Nov	Satan Black	141	Lester Dent	Modest Stein	Doc, Monk, Ham, Renny
1944	Dec	The Lost Giant	142	Lester Dent	Modest Stein	Doc, Monk, Ham
1945	Jan	Violent Night / The Hate Genius	143	Lester Dent	Modest Stein	Doc, Monk, Ham, Pat
1945	Feb	Strange Fish	144	Lester Dent	Modest Stein	Doc, Monk, Ham
1945	Mar	The Ten Ton Snakes	145	Lester Dent	Modest Stein	Doc, Monk, Renny
1945	Apr	Cargo Unknown	146	Lester Dent	Modest Stein	Doc, Monk, Ham, Renny
1945	May	Rock Sinister	147	Lester Dent	Modest Stein	Doc, Monk, Ham
1945	Jun	The Terrible Stork	148	Lester Dent	Modest Stein	Doc, Monk, Ham
1945	Jul	King Joe Cay	149	Lester Dent	Modest Stein	Doc, alone
1945	Aug	The Wee Ones	150	Lester Dent	Modest Stein	Doc, Monk, Ham
1945	Sep	Terror Takes 7	151	Lester Dent	Modest Stein	Doc, Monk, Ham, Pat
1945	Oct	The Thing That Pursued	152	Lester Dent	Emery Clarke	Doc, alone
1945	Nov	Trouble on Parade	153	Lester Dent	Emery Clarke	Doc, alone
1945	Dec	The Screaming Man	154	Lester Dent	Emery Clarke	Doc, Monk, Ham, Johnny
1946	Jan	Measures for a Coffin	155	Lester Dent	Emery Clarke	Doc, Monk, Ham
1946	Feb	Se-Pah-Poo	156	Lester Dent	Emery Clarke	Doc, Monk, Ham
1946	Mar	Terror and the Lonely Widow	157	Lester Dent	Emery Clarke	Doc, Monk, Ham, Renny
1946	Apr	Five Fathoms Dead	158	Lester Dent	Emery Clarke	Doc, Ham, Renny
1946	May	Death is a Round Black Spot	159	Lester Dent	Emery Clarke	Doc, Monk, Ham, Pat
1946	Jun	Colors for Murder	160	Lester Dent	Emery Clarke	Doc, Monk, Ham
1946	Jul	Fire and Ice	161	Lester Dent / William G. Bogart	Emery Clarke	Doc, Monk, Ham
1946	Aug	Three Times a Corpse	162	Lester Dent	Charles J. Ravel	Doc, Monk, Ham
1946	Sep	The Exploding Lake	163	Lester Dent / Harold A. Davis	Charles J. Ravel	Doc, Monk, Ham, Renny
1946	Oct	Death in Little Houses	164	Lester Dent / William G. Bogart	Charles J. Ravel	Doc, Monk, Ham
1946	Nov	The Devil Is Jones	165	Lester Dent	Charles J. Ravel	Doc, Monk, Ham, Johnny
1946	Dec	The Disappearing Lady	166	William G. Bogart	Charles J. Ravel	Doc, Monk, Ham
1947	Jan	Target for Death	167	William G. Bogart	Walter Swenson	Doc, Monk, Ham, Renny, Pat
1947	Feb	The Death Lady	168	William G. Bogart	Walter Swenson	Doc, Monk, Ham, Long Tom
1947	Mar / Apr	Danger Lies East	169	Lester Dent	Walter Swenson	Doc, Monk, Ham
1947	May / Jun	No Light to Die By	170	Lester Dent	Walter Swenson	Doc, Monk, Ham
1947	Jul / Aug	The Monkey Suit	171	Lester Dent	Walter Swenson	Doc, Monk
1947	Sep / Oct	Let's Kill Ames	172	Lester Dent	Walter Swenson	Doc, Ham
1947	Nov / Dec	Once Over Lightly	173	Lester Dent	Walter Swenson	Doc, Monk
1948	Jan / Feb	I Died Yesterday	174	Lester Dent	Walter Swenson	Doc, Monk, Pat
1948	Mar / Apr	The Pure Evil	175	Lester Dent	Edd Cartier	Doc, Monk, Ham, Renny
1948	May / Jun	Terror Wears No Shoes	176	Lester Dent	Walter Swenson	Doc, Monk, Ham, Long Tom
1948	Jul / Aug	The Angry Canary	177	Lester Dent	Walter Swenson	Doc, Monk, Ham
1948	Sep / Oct	The Swooning Lady	178	Lester Dent	Walter Swenson	Doc, Monk, Ham
1949	Winter	The Green Master	179	Lester Dent	George Rozen	Doc, Monk, Ham
1949	Spring	Return From Cormoral	180	Lester Dent	George Rozen	Doc, Monk, Ham
1949	Summer	Up From Earth's Center	181	Lester Dent	George Rozen	Doc, Monk, Ham

== Doc Savage Magazine (1975) ==
Magazine Management Co, Inc, a Marvel imprint also called Curtis Magazines, published eight black-and-white illustrated magazines as a movie tie-in. The cover of the first issue was an elaboration of the poster for the 1975 film Doc Savage: The Man of Bronze painted by Roger Kastel, with all of the other covers painted by Ken Barr. So, for eight issues, a Doc Savage magazine reappeared on newsstands. The stories were reprinted in Showcase Presents: Doc Savage and again as Doc Savage Archives: Vol 1.

Year	Month	Series #	Title	Author	Artwork	Description
1975	Aug	1	Doom on Thunder Island	Doug Moench	John Buscema / Tony DeZuniga	The "Silver Ziggurat" destroys skyscrapers with lightning, and leads Doc's crew to a Pacific Island of electrically enhanced tigers and "manimals". Includes an article on the Doc Savage movie and interview with director George Pal.
1975	Oct	2	The Hell Reapers	Doug Moench	Tony DeZuniga	Includes an interview with Ron Ely about his role as Doc Savage.
1976	Jan	3	The Inferno Scheme	Doug Moench	John Buscema / Tony DeZuniga	Includes a solo tale starring Monk, A Most Singular Writ of Habeas Corpus, with art by Rico Rival.
1976	Apr	4	Ghost Pirates from the Beyond	Doug Moench	Tony DeZuniga / Marie Severin	
1976	Jul	5	The Earth-Wreckers!	Doug Moench	Tony DeZuniga	Includes articles "The Pulp Doc Savage" and "An Interview with Mrs. Lester Dent".
1976	Oct	6	The Sky-Stealers!	Doug Moench	Tony DeZuniga	Includes an article on "Renny" by Bob Sampson.
1977	Jan	7	The Mayan Mutations	Doug Moench	Val Mayerik / Tony DeZuniga	Includes an article on "Johnny" by Bob Sampson.
1977	Spring	8	The Crimson Plague!	Doug Moench / John Warner / John Whitmore	Ernie Chan	Final issue.

== Doc Savage novels ==
The list includes original Doc Savage and related novels either entirely new or developed from Lester Dent's stories and notes.

Year	Month	Title	Series #	Author	Notes
1979	Jul	In Hell, Madonna / The Red Spider	182	Lester Dent	Originally submitted on Monday, 3 May 1948 but not published until July 1979 as No. 95 in the Bantam Books paperback series. / Cover: Bob Larkin
1991	Aug	Escape from Loki	183	Philip José Farmer	Doc, Monk, Ham, Renny, Johnny, Long Tom / Cover: Steve Assel
1991	Oct	Python Isle	184	Lester Dent / Will Murray	Cover: Joe DeVito
1992	Mar	White Eyes	185	Lester Dent / Will Murray	Cover: Joe DeVito
1992	Jul	The Frightened Fish	186	Lester Dent / Will Murray	Cover: Joe DeVito
1992	Oct	The Jade Ogre	187	Lester Dent / Will Murray	Cover: Joe DeVito
1993	Mar	Flight into Fear	188	Lester Dent / Will Murray	Cover: Joe DeVito
1993	Jul	The Whistling Wraith	189	Lester Dent / Will Murray	Cover: Joe DeVito
1993	Nov	The Forgotten Realm	190	Lester Dent / Will Murray	Cover: Joe DeVito
2011	Jul	The Desert Demons	191	Lester Dent / Will Murray	Cover: Joe DeVito
2011	Nov	Horror in Gold	192	Lester Dent / Will Murray	Cover: Joe DeVito
2012	May	The Infernal Buddha	193	Lester Dent / Will Murray	Cover: Joe DeVito
2012	Sep	Death's Dark Domain	194	Lester Dent / Will Murray	Cover: Joe DeVito
2013	Mar	Skull Island	195	Will Murray	Cover: Joe DeVito
2013	Sep	The Miracle Menace	196	Lester Dent / Will Murray	Cover: Joe DeVito
2013	Dec	Phantom Lagoon	197	Lester Dent / Will Murray	Cover: Joe DeVito
2014	May	The War Makers	198	Ryerson Johnson / Will Murray	Cover: Joe DeVito
2014	Sep	The Ice Genius	199	Lester Dent / Will Murray	Cover: Joe DeVito
2015	June	The Sinister Shadow	200	Lester Dent / Will Murray	Cover: Joe DeVito
2015	Nov	The Secret of Satan's Spine	201	Lester Dent / Will Murray	Cover: Joe DeVito
2016	May	Glare of the Gorgon	202	Lester Dent / Will Murray	Cover: Joe DeVito
2016	Oct	Six Scarlet Scorpions	203	Lester Dent / Will Murray	Pat Savage Story / Cover: Joe DeVito
2017	Jan	Empire of Doom	204	Lester Dent / Will Murray	Cover: Joe DeVito
2018	Mar	Mr. Calamity	205	Lester Dent / Will Murray	Cover: Joe DeVito
2018	Mar	The Valley of Eternity	206	Lester Dent / Will Murray	Cover: Joe DeVito
2022	Nov	The Perfect Assassin	207	James Patterson / Brian Sitts	A story featuring Professor Brandt Savage, the great-grandson of the original Doc Savage
2024	Oct	Murder Island	208	James Patterson / Brian Sitts	A story featuring Professor Brandt Savage, the great-grandson of the original Doc Savage
