= Doc Savage (magazine) =

American pulp magazine (1933–1949)

- Cover of the March 1933 issue
- Categories: Pulp magazine
- Publisher: Street & Smith
- First issue: March 1933
- Final issue: Fall 1949

Doc Savage was an American pulp magazine that was published from 1933 to 1949 by Street & Smith. It was launched as a follow-up to the success of The Shadow, a magazine Street & Smith had started in 1931, based around a single character. Doc Savage's lead character, Clark Savage, was a scientist and adventurer, rather than purely a detective. Lester Dent was hired to write the lead novels, almost all of which were published under the house name "Kenneth Robeson". A few dozen novels were ghost-written by other writers, hired either by Dent or by Street & Smith. The magazine was successful, but was shut down in 1949 as part of Street & Smith's decision to abandon the pulp magazine field completely.

Dent's work was full of inventive ideas, and ranged across multiple genres. Science fictional gadgets were common, but there were also detective novels, westerns, fantasies, and straightforward adventures. Dent worked with Henry Ralston and (until 1943) John Nanovic, two editors at Street & Smith, to plot the novels, though in a few cases ghost-writers were given leeway to create their own plots without Dent's involvement. Early covers were painted by Walter Baumhofer; when Baumhofer left Street & Smith in 1936 he was replaced by R. G. Harris and then by Emery Clarke.

The magazine was very successful, reaching a circulation of 300,000. After the magazine ceased publication, the franchise continued; the novels were later reprinted as paperbacks, and new novels were eventually written by Philip José Farmer, pulp historian Will Murray, and James Patterson. The prose style was action-oriented and Dent had a low opinion of his work, describing his life's output as consisting mostly of "reams of saleable crap".

== Publishing history ==
=== Development ===
In 1930, CBS began broadcasting The Detective Story Hour, a radio program that used scripts from Detective Story Magazine, a pulp magazine published by Street & Smith. In every episode the narrator, named The Shadow, spoke the line: "Who knows what evil lurks in the hearts of men? The Shadow knows." in a sinister voice, and readers began asking at newsstands for "the Shadow magazine". Henry W. Ralston, Street & Smith's business manager, decided that this was an opportunity to revive the idea of a magazine based around a single character. This had been a common publishing approach during the era of the dime novel, with lead characters such as Nick Carter and Frank Merriwell, but had fallen out of fashion, because when readers tired of the lead character, they tired of the magazine. Instead, pulp magazines often featured series of stories about popular protagonists, but never relied solely on them to sell a magazine.

The new magazine, titled The Shadow, was an immediate success, and Ralston began looking for other opportunities to create "hero pulps", as the genre became known. An idea for a magazine titled The Phantom had to be abandoned when Standard Publications, a competing publisher that had also noticed the success of The Shadow, launched The Phantom Detective in early 1933. Ralston resurrected Carter in Nick Carter Magazine, with the first issue dated March 1933, but also began planning a magazine based on a new character, to be named Doc Savage. The name was inspired by Richard Henry Savage, an adventurer of the late 19th century; Doc Savage's first name, Clark, came from film star Clark Gable. Ralston began work on the idea for Doc Savage in early 1932, and when Street & Smith hired John Nanovic to edit The Shadow, the two of them collaborated on the concept. Nanovic wrote up the notes from his and Ralston's discussions as a 28-page short story titled "Doc Savage, Supreme Adventurer" which provided "the characters, the basic concept, the background" for the whole series. (Note: Sources variously describe "Doc Savage, Supreme Adventurer" as 70 pages or 30 pages long, but pulp historian Will Murray located a copy among Lester Dent's effects in 1978 and confirmed it was 28 pages long.)

In February 1932 Frank Blackwell, Street & Smith's editor-in-chief, contacted Lester Dent, a pulp writer in his twenties with a dozen or so published stories, asking him to submit one or more novels for The Shadow. (Note: Blackwell's letter was probably written at Ralston's request.) Dent had been hired by Dell Magazines the year before to write stories for Sky Riders and Scotland Yard, but both magazines had ceased publication within a few months of his arrival in New York. Nanovic's outline was probably not complete at the time Dent was first contacted; the concept for Doc Savage did not firm up quickly, and even the name for the new character was not settled for a long time. Dent's Shadow novel was rejected, partly through an unfortunate coincidence of plot with another Shadow novel submitted a few days earlier, but Dent was hired to write the Doc Savage novels regardless. Street & Smith may have been influenced to hire Dent by a story he wrote called "The Sinister Ray", the first of a series featuring Lynn Lash, a "gadget detective". The story appeared in the March 1932 issue of Detective-Dragnet, and featured the same scientific approach to detection that Ralston was seeking for Doc Savage.

=== Launch and magazine history ===
Issue data for Doc Savage
	Spring			Summer			Fall			Winter		
	Jan	Feb	Mar	Apr	May	Jun	Jul	Aug	Sep	Oct	Nov	Dec
1933			1/1	1/2	1/3	1/4	1/5	1/6	2/1	2/2	2/3	2/4
1934	2/5	2/6	3/1	3/2	3/3	3/4	3/5	3/6	4/1	4/2	4/3	4/4
1935	4/5	4/6	5/1	5/2	5/3	5/4	5/5	5/6	6/1	6/2	6/3	6/4
1936	6/5	6/6	7/1	7/2	7/3	7/4	7/5	7/6	8/1	8/2	8/3	8/4
1937	8/5	8/6	9/1	9/2	9/3	9/4	9/5	9/6	10/1	10/2	10/3	10/4
1938	10/5	10/6	11/1	11/2	11/3	11/4	11/5	11/6	12/1	12/2	12/3	12/4
1939	12/5	12/6	13/1	13/2	13/3	13/4	13/5	13/6	14/1	14/2	14/3	14/4
1940	14/5	14/6	15/1	15/2	15/3	15/4	15/5	15/6	16/1	16/2	16/3	16/4
1941	16/5	16/6	17/1	17/2	17/3	17/4	17/5	17/6	18/1	18/2	18/3	18/4
1942	18/5	18/6	19/1	19/2	19/3	19/4	19/5	19/6	20/1	20/2	20/3	20/4
1943	20/5	20/6	21/1	21/2	21/3	21/4	21/5	21/6	22/1	22/2	22/3	22/4
1944	22/5	22/6	23/1	23/2	23/3	23/4	23/5	23/6	24/1	24/2	24/3	24/4
1945	24/5	24/6	25/1	25/2	25/3	25/4	25/5	25/6	26/1	26/2	26/3	26/4
1946	26/5	26/6	27/1	27/2	27/3	27/4	27/5	27/6	28/1	28/2	28/3	28/4
1947	28/5	28/6	29/1		29/2		29/3		29/4		29/5	
1948	29/6		30/1		30/2		30/3		30/4			
1949	30/5			30/6			31/1					
Issues of Doc Savage, showing volume and issue number. Underlining indicates that an issue was titled as a quarterly (e.g."Fall 1949") rather than as a monthly. The colors identify the editors for each issue: John Nanovic Charles Moran Babette Rosmond William De Grouchy; Daisy Bacon

The first issue of the new magazine was dated March 1933, (Note: Street & Smith may have delayed the launch from 1932 because of poor market conditions during the Depression.) and the lead novel was The Man of Bronze. The author was Lester Dent, but the novel was published as by Kenneth Roberts, a pseudonym intended by Street & Smith to be used for all future Doc Savage novels. A house name, as corporate pseudonyms like this were known, gave readers the illusion of consistent authorship, even though the novels that used the house name might conceal several different writers over time. The house name was changed to Kenneth Robeson from the second issue to avoid confusion with a real writer named Kenneth Roberts. The magazine was quickly successful, soon reaching 200,000 in circulation, and eventually settling at 300,000, a very high figure for a pulp magazine.

Every issue featured a complete novel, and Dent wrote each of these for over a year. His contract with Street & Smith paid him $700 for each novel, (Note: The rate was increased to $750 per novel in July 1935.) but allowed him to hire ghost-writers if he wished, and in 1934 he began looking for another writer to take on some of the work. The first ghost-writer he hired was Harold A. Davis, an old colleague of Dent's from his days working on the Tulsa World. Davis's The King Maker appeared in the June 1934 issue; he wrote a total of fourteen of the magazine's lead novels, ending with The Exploding Lake in the September 1946 issue. Davis was followed by Ryerson Johnson, whose Land of Always-Night was written in late 1934 and was printed in March 1935. Johnson wrote two more novels, but only one saw print: The Fantastic Island, in December 1935. The other, The Motion Menace, was completely rewritten by Dent, who kept only the title and main plot idea; Dent's version saw print in May 1938. In about 1935 Street & Smith decided to commission a ghost-writer for Doc Savage independently of Dent; the reason why is unclear but they might have been trying to find a back-up for Dent, who was bored by his Doc Savage writing obligations and appeared likely to resign. The writer they hired, Laurence Donovan, produced nine novels in just nine months, beginning with Cold Death in April 1935. The first one published was Murder Melody, which appeared in the November 1935 issue of Doc Savage. The stories written by Donovan have sometimes been credited to another pulp writer, Norman A. Danberg, but this is an error, prompted by an editorial mistake that made it appear that "Laurence Donovan" was a pseudonym of Danberg's. Another possible ghost-writer was Martin E. Baker, Dent's secretary from late 1934 to late 1935. Baker was paid $300 by Dent for work on an unidentified Doc Savage manuscript, which Dent may have either abandoned or completely rewritten.

Donovan's rapid production meant that for two years Dent needed to spend much less time writing Doc Savage novels. The last of the backlog was published in 1937, and a new ghost-writer was recruited: William G. Bogart, who worked for Nanovic and wrote short stories as well. At some point in the late 1930s Bogart left Street & Smith to write full time, and it was at about this time he began to write Doc Savage novels. He wrote nine between 1938 and 1940, starting with World's Fair Goblin, which appeared in April 1939. Bogart's novels were subcontracted through Dent, but Street & Smith hired Alan Hathway as another ghost-writer in 1939, independently of Dent. By 1942 Hathway had produced four Doc Savage novels, all published between January 1941 and January 1942. Dent also offered ghost-writing work to Edmond Hamilton, but Hamilton declined, citing the pressure of writing lead novels for Captain Future.

Dent's need for ghost-writers over the first few years of Doc Savage diminished after 1941, as he traveled less because of the war. Wartime paper shortages forced Street & Smith to cease publication of many of their titles, but Doc Savage was one of the handful of survivors. Nanovic was dismissed by Street & Smith in 1943, and for six months the magazines were edited by Charles Moran. The format shrank from pulp to digest with the January 1944 issue. (Note: Pulp magazines were about 7 by 10 inches (18 by 25 cm); digest magazines are about 5 by 7.5 inches (13 by 19 cm).) Moran was succeeded by Babette Rosmond, who gave the day-to-day work of managing Doc Savage to a sub-editor, a woman who was unfamiliar with the magazine. As a result, one of Dent's novels appeared under his own name, rather than under the house name Kenneth Robeson: this was The Derelict of Skull Shoal, in the March 1944 issue. In 1946 Dent rehired Bogart to write two more Doc Savage novels; Dent was now writing mysteries for book publication and needed to make time in his writing schedule. Bogart followed this with another three Doc Savage novels contracted directly with Street & Smith, rather than via Dent.

The magazine's frequency dropped from monthly to bimonthly in early 1947. A year later Rosmond left Street & Smith. She was replaced for two issues by William de Grouchy, who was in turn replaced by Daisy Bacon, who took over as editor of The Shadow at the same time. Bacon persuaded Street & Smith to go back to the original pulp-sized format, and switched the magazine to a quarterly schedule. An issue was skipped because Bacon turned down the novel Dent had submitted, so the first quarterly issue was dated Winter 1949. In April, Bacon was told by her management to stop acquiring fiction and art, and on April 9 it was announced that almost every one of Street & Smith's fiction titles was being canceled. The last issue of Doc Savage was dated Fall 1949.

== Contents and reception ==
=== Characters and plot development ===
The lead novel for the first issue, titled The Man of Bronze, introduced Doc Savage and five companions who would feature throughout the series: "Renny" Renwick, an engineer; "Monk" Mayfair, an industrial chemist; "Ham" Brooks, a lawyer; "Long Tom" Roberts, an expert on electricity; and "Johnny" Littlejohn, an archaeologist and geologist. Savage himself was given an incredible array of skills: he was a surgeon and a brilliant inventor, and an expert in many scientific fields. He was also an impressive physical specimen: six feet four inches tall, with a permanent bronze tan, and enormous strength. His strength came in part from a daily routine of two hours of exercises that his father taught him. In The Man of Bronze Savage investigates the death of his father, and discovers a lost valley in Central America, where a tribe of Mayans live. Savage inherits from his father the gold that is mined from the valley, which funds his adventures for the rest of his career.

Each novel was initially outlined in meetings between Ralston, Nanovic, and Dent. Ralston would introduce an idea, such as the discovery of a land where dinosaurs still lived, and Dent would take notes. Murray describes Nanovic as a "referee" in these meetings, "pointing out strengths and weaknesses, or that such-and-such an idea [had] been used too much in a competitor's magazine or their own". From the initial notes would come the bones of a plot, with character names and miscellaneous details. The meetings would generate material for as many as three novels at a time. Dent and Nanovic would follow up the meetings with further discussion, and then Dent would write a summary, no more than a couple of pages long, for Nanovic to approve. The next step was the outline, several times longer, including background material and a paragraph of detail for each proposed chapter. Nanovic might make further changes at this point, after which Dent would write the novel. Dent would not always follow the plot outline exactly, and occasionally made substantial changes, if he ran into plotting issues. Not every novel was created in this way—occasionally Dent would write one without getting prior approval, and in some cases he then had to make changes to the completed novel if Nanovic wanted plot elements removed or changed for some reason. After Nanovic left Street & Smith the outlines became less detailed.

Occasionally a novel would get as far as an outline, or further, but did not appear in Doc Savage. One such novel was Python Isle, in which Dent planned to have Savage fighting pythons; Nanovic turned down the outline on the grounds that readers had objected to recent short stories by Richard Sale featuring snakes. Sale had been considered as a possible ghost-writer for the novel, but in the end it was shelved till after Dent's death, and eventually turned into a novel by Will Murray. Dent used plot elements from Python Isle in several other Doc Savage stories. Another was In Hell, Madonna, which was written while de Grouchy was editor and was set in Russia, with a cold war plot. Reader reaction to a recent Doc Savage novel with a Red Scare theme had been negative, and Bacon turned the novel down. It eventually appeared in paperback in 1979 under the title The Red Spider.

Dent used what he called his "Master Plot Formula" to plot his work. In 1936 he wrote an article about his approach that was reprinted by Writer's Digest and brought him hundreds of letters from would-be writers, many saying the formula had worked for them. Dent gave an example of how to plot a 6,000-word story by dividing it into four 1,500-word segments, in which the hero gets involved with the victim and escapes physical danger in the first quarter, with a surprise twist to the plot to start the second quarter. The hero must struggle throughout this segment, which ends with another scene where the hero is threatened. In the third segment it must seem that the villain is triumphing over the hero, and in the final 1,500 words the hero must overcome more difficulties to win the day, but with the suspense and menace delayed to as close to the end of the story as possible. Dent also recommended creating a list of characters with "tags": distinguishing characteristics that could be used to help the reader identify and remember the individuals in the story's cast.

At one time Ralston considered getting Dent and Walter Gibson, the author of the Shadow novels, to collaborate on an adventure featuring both Doc Savage and the Shadow. The project never came to fruition; one reason was that the resulting novel would probably not fit well into either The Shadow or Doc Savage since adventure and mystery were quite different genres; another was that the readers of one magazine might not be fans of the other hero.

=== Style ===
Dent drew on his own experience for the background; he had worked on a ranch and as a telegraph operator, prospected for gold, and (by the mid-1930s) acquired a boat in which he sailed the Caribbean and dove for treasure. He also learned how to fly a plane. There was no set genre for the novels: Murray lists examples of adventure, science fiction, cold war, detective, fantasy, western, and juvenile novels from the magazine. Science fiction was the most common genre, with almost every novel featuring some science fictional element or an invented gadget, though in some cases there turned out to be a mundane explanation for the apparently fantastic events. The science fiction ideas included a metal-destroying ray, a teleportation mechanism, and the ability to revive a dead person from history.

Pulp historian Lee Server describes Dent as "recklessly generous" with his plot ideas, and cites as an example The Lost Oasis, published in 1933, which included "a hijacked zeppelin, a gorgeous English aviatrix, trained vampire bats in New York harbor, a pair of Middle Eastern bad guys, a desert prison camp, Doc and gang in an autogiro dogfight, jewel-bearing vultures, car chases, man-eating plants, a slave revolt, and a lost African diamond mine". Murray describes the novels as becoming tamer by the 1940s, "in keeping with the less slam-bang trend in pulp fiction". War and espionage plots began to figure heavily after the US entered World War II, but by 1945, with the war's end in sight, the novels switched to detective plots, although these were more realistically written than the early novels had been. Murray describes Savage's character in 1946 as "little more than a high-powered detective whose cases might take him out of the country on occasion", also commenting that 1946 saw the "absolute nadir" of Dent's writing, with plots re-used from previous novels and unpublished material. When Rosmond took over as editor, she was unimpressed by Dent's work and for a while moved the Doc Savage novel to the back of the magazine, instead of running it as the lead story, and added a second novel in each issue, written by one of the new writers she was working with, such as John D. MacDonald. Rosmond wanted to change the magazine's image; the change to digest-size was part of this plan, as was a change in the covers from action scenes to more abstract artwork. Dent changed his writing style to suit Rosmond's preference, in an attempt to copy the higher prose standards of the slick magazines. The magazine did not do well under Rosmond's editorship, and when Bacon took over as editor she asked Dent to return to his older pulp style. The novels were originally 50,000 to 60,000 words long. This was reduced in the late 1930s to 45,000 words, then to 40,000 words for the ones that appeared in digest format. The last Doc Savage novels Dent wrote, for Bacon, were even shorter, at 30,000 words.

The ghost-writers each had their own style. Davis, like Dent, had been trained in the newspaper industry, and wrote prose that Dent did not need to revise much. Johnson's Land of Always-Night was heavily rewritten by Dent. Murray suggests that the revisions were needed because Johnson's prose was "in a rich, dense style that dwelt upon detail", unlike the action-oriented pulp prose of Dent's own work. Johnson learned enough from Dent's revisions that "when I tackled Fantastic Island I was able to get it more into his style, and he didn't change it much". However, Johnson also made continuity errors, such as changing the hair and eye color of characters, and though Dent corrected some of these, the ones that slipped through were sometimes picked up by other ghost-writers and perpetuated. Dent allowed Johnson to plot his own novels, rather than supplying him with plot outlines to work from; Dent did not give all his ghost-writers the same leeway.

Donovan's Doc Savage stories began with two novels, Cold Death and Murder Melody, that reworked the plot of Land of Always-Night, but thereafter the plot ideas are thought to be Donovan's own work. Murray describes them as "more complex in terms of plot and gadgetry", with even more bizarre science-fictional ideas than in Dent's own week. Murray cites "glowing globes that evaporate humans; a solar-powered submarine gliding through a world bereft of electricity; mind control; [and] human giants" as some of Donovan's inventions. Donovan was also the first Doc Savage author to give Savage a female antagonist. Bogart, whom Dent hired in the late 1930s, was given much less freedom than Donovan: it appears that Dent gave Bogart the plots for most of his novels, and revised the results himself before submitting them. Two of Bogart's novels, The Spotted Men and The Tunnel Terror, were written independently; Murray suggests that these stories were weak enough to convince Dent to go back to plotting the novels and rewriting Bogart's drafts.

Dent had no input into the novels written by Hathway, the last ghost-writer to be hired; Hathway worked directly for Street & Smith. However, it appears that Hathway took some direction from Davis; the two men were friends, and there are similarities of plot between some of their novels, and also some continuity errors that appear in work by each of them. Hathway's work is so similar to Davis's that Murray suggests the two men may have cowritten some of the novels credited to Davis.

=== Short stories and cover art ===
Despite the frequent appearance of science fiction ideas in the plots of the lead novels, Street & Smith considered Doc Savage to be an adventure magazine, not a science fiction magazine, so the short stories that accompanied the novel were straightforward adventure fiction. Writers who frequently contributed these stories included Steve Fisher, Laurence Donovan, and William Bogart. In 1936 Street & Smith launched The Skipper, another hero pulp with maritime settings; it failed after a year, but the stories featuring the lead character appeared in most Doc Savage issues until late in 1943. These appeared under the house name Wallace Brooker; the stories were mostly written by Donovan and Norman Daniels, with a handful contributed by Bogart and Davis.

The covers were initially all painted by Walter Baumhofer, and pulp historian Ed Hulse suggests that his "uniformly impressive" work played a significant part in the rapid success of the magazine. Baumhofer left Street & Smith in 1936; he was succeeded as Doc Savage's cover artist by R. G. Harris, and then in 1938 by Emery Clarke.

=== Reception and influence ===
Lee Server describes Doc Savage as "one of the supreme achievements in the history of the pulps". Server acknowledges that Dent's reliance on formulaic plots could lead to "mechanical" fiction, but comments that Dent "disguised it well with an endless supply of dazzling distractions". Hulse considers Dent "a fine writer of pulp fiction, owing to a remarkably fertile imagination and a keen sense of pacing". The magazine was a best-seller for Street & Smith. The franchise was never as successful as The Shadow, but there were comics and a radio serial, and after it ceased publication the franchise continued, with a paperback reprint series of the novels beginning in the 1960s, followed by new novels written by Will Murray. A 1975 film, Doc Savage: The Man of Bronze, produced by George Pal and starring Ron Ely as Savage, was a commercial failure. Despite the successes, Dent never felt that his work for Doc Savage was good writing, describing the bulk of his fiction over the years as "reams of saleable crap".

MacDonald sold many short stories to Doc Savage, and in 1947 Rosmond asked him if he would be interested in becoming one of the ghost writers of the lead novels. MacDonald had never read any of the Doc Savage novels, so he read two of them from back issues of the magazine, and told Rosmond he could not do it. "I could not fault [the novels] on the basis of action, or moving the people around, but I just could not bring myself to imitate a prose style so wooden, so clumsy, so inadvertently hilarious that it was like a parody of the style you might term Early Comic Book. I said that Doc seemed to me to be a truly great comic figure, and I was sorry to let her down ..."

== Bibliographic details ==
Doc Savage was published by Street & Smith, and produced 181 issues between March 1933 and Summer 1949. It was pulp format from the beginning until December 1943; it switched to digest format from January 1944 to the September/October 1948 issue, and then back to pulp for the 1949 issues. Doc Savage began as a monthly, and stayed on that schedule until February 1947; it was bimonthly from March–April 1947 until September–October 1948. The last three issues, in 1949, were quarterly. The title began as Doc Savage Magazine, and was abbreviated to just Doc Savage for the September 1937 issue. Between the September/October 1947 and September/October 1948 issues a subtitle was added: Doc Savage: Science Detective. The page count was 128 pages until the July 1938 issue; thereafter it varied between 114 and 164 pages. The price was initially 10 cents; this was increased to 15 cents in May 1943, and to 25 cents for the March–April 1947 issue. There were thirty volumes of six issues, and a final volume of one issue.

A Canadian reprint edition began in August 1933, and ran to at least December 1936, though it is not known whether an issue appeared in each month. Another Canadian reprint series began in July 1941, appearing monthly at least until February 1945. Bibliographic sources also record British and Spanish editions from the 1940s, but give no details.

== Sources ==
- Cox, J. Randolph (1983). "Nick Carter Magazine". In Cook, Michael L. (ed.). Mystery, Detective, and Espionage Magazines. Westport, Connecticut: Greenwood Press. pp. 379–381. ISBN 0-313-23310-1.
- Goulart, Ron (1973) [1972]. An Informal History of the Pulp Magazines. New York: Ace Books. ISBN 0-441-37070-5.
- Harmon, Jim (2011). Radio Mystery and Adventure and Its Appearances in Film, Television and Other Media. Jefferson, North Carolina: McFarland. ISBN 978-0-7864-8508-6.
- Hulse, Ed (2013). The Blood'n'Thunder Guide to Pulp Fiction. Morris Plains, New Jersey: Murania Press. ISBN 978-1491010938.
- Martin McCarey-Laird, M. (1994). Lester Dent: The Man, His Craft and His Market. Des Moines, Iowa: Hidalgo Publishing Company. ISBN 0-9641004-9-5.
- Murray, Will (1983). "Doc Savage". In Cook, Michael L. (ed.). Mystery, Detective, and Espionage Magazines. Westport, Connecticut: Greenwood Press. pp. 177–182. ISBN 0-313-23310-1.
- Murray, Will (2012). Writings in Bronze. Boston: Altus Press. ISBN 978-1-61827-045-0.
- Murray, Will; Weinberg, Robert (1985). "The Shadow". In Tymn, Marshall B.; Ashley, Mike (eds.). Science Fiction, Fantasy and Weird Fiction Magazines. Westport, Connecticut: Greenwood Press. pp. 570–573. ISBN 0-3132-1221-X.
- Powers, Laurie (2019). Queen of the Pulps: The Reign of Daisy Bacon and Love Story Magazine. Jefferson, North Carolina: McFarland. ISBN 978-1-4766-7396-7.
- Reynolds, Quentin (1955). The Fiction Factory or From Pulp Row to Quality Street. New York: Random House.
- Sampson, Robert (1983). "The Phantom Detective". In Cook, Michael L. (ed.). Mystery, Detective, and Espionage Magazines. Westport, Connecticut: Greenwood Press. pp. 408–414. ISBN 0-313-23310-1.
- Server, Lee (1993). Danger Is My Business: An Illustrated History of the Fabulous Pulp Magazines. San Francisco: Chronicle Books. ISBN 0-8118-0112-8.
- Server, Lee (2002). Encyclopedia of Pulp Fiction Writers. New York: Checkmark Books. ISBN 0-8160-4578-X.
- Sterling, Christopher H., ed. (2004). Encyclopedia of Radio. New York City: Fitzroy Dearborn. ISBN 978-1-135-45649-8.
- Weinberg, Robert (1985). "Doc Savage". In Tymn, Marshall B.; Ashley, Mike (eds.). Science Fiction, Fantasy and Weird Fiction Magazines. Westport, Connecticut: Greenwood Press. pp. 183–185. ISBN 0-3132-1221-X.
