= Death in Silver =

1934 novel by Lester Dent

- Cover of the original October 1934 issue of Doc Savage
- Author: Lester Dent
- Illustrator: Paul Orban
- Cover artist: Walter M. Baumhofer
- Language: English
- Series: Doc Savage
- Genre: Pulp Adventure
- Publisher: Street & Smith
- Publication date: October 1934
- Publication place: United States
- Media type: Pulp magazine
- Preceded by: Fear Cay
- Followed by: The Sea Magician

Death in Silver is a Doc Savage pulp novel by Lester Dent writing under the house name Kenneth Robeson. It was published in October 1934.

It was the first Doc Savage story not to include all of his aides, due to author Lester Dent having difficulties using all six characters in every story. Only Ham, Monk and Pat appeared in Death in Silver.

The other three, less popular, main characters are described as being away on private ventures: Johnny giving a lecture in London, Long Tom experimenting on an electrical pesticide in Europe, and Renny building a hydro-electric plant in South Africa.

The original intent was that all three would become the basis of the next three novels.

Johnny's story became The Sea Magician in the next issue of Doc Savage, but this did not happen with all of them.

The follow-up adventure involving Renny later became the basis for the 1991 retro novel Python Isle by Will Murray.

Death in Silver was the third appearance of Pat Savage.

== Summary ==
The Silver Death's-Heads, a gang of criminals who wear silver overalls and masks, have been committing seemingly random crimes for months. They become involved when they attack Paine L. Winthrop, a shipyard owner who has offices in the same building as Monk. When his office explodes, Monk and Ham investigate but are captured while reporting back to Doc Savage. With his other aides abroad, Doc Savage attempts to rescue them and solve the case alone. One of the first things he accomplishes is to deduce the nature of the explosion, which has eluded his aides and the police — it was caused by a three-inch shell.

Investigating the deaths of other witnesses to the attack (a fisherman on the river and an aviator flying that day) leads Doc to Winthrop's Shipyards. The Silver Death's-Heads steal some blueprints to hide their secrets while Doc runs into Winthrop's Secretary, Lorna Zane, and efficiency expert, Harry "Rapid" Pace (who has the annoying habit of repeating almost everything twice). Doc leaves Lorna with his cousin Pat at her new beauty salon/gymnasium. Harry leads the Doc to the home of Bedford Burgess Gardner (owner of Transatlantic Lines and Winthorp's chief rival) based on a comment from the gang overheard at the shipyard.

Again they run into the gang, and pick up Hugh McCoy, Gardner's Financial Relations Consultant (advising on the merger with Paine L. Winthrop's company) and Pace's rival for Lorna Zane's affections. By questioning an injured gang member, who had been poisoned by his own gang, they find that Monk and Ham are held at the "Indian's Head". Doc browses a telephone directory at an all-night drug store and picks out the "Indian Head Club". When asked he explains that its address is on the waterfront and the Silver Death's-Heads always seem to escape by the river. His deduction is correct and, through stealth and violence, he rescues his aides. They all only narrowly miss being killed when the gang demolish the club with a bomb to destroy evidence. Meanwhile, the Silver Death's-Heads kidnap Pat and Lorna from Pat's salon.

Based on a map of New York Harbor found at the club before it exploded and burned down, Doc and Monk go out onto the foggy river to investigate. Diving from the boat, Doc discovers a submerged radio-buoy at a point marked on the map. Further investigation is cut short by a shell apparently fired by an unseen submarine. Ull, the leader of the Death's-Heads (but not the "big brain" behind their plans) sets a trap for Doc with Pat and Lorna as bait. A fake snitch calls Doc with some information but is cut off by a mock attack in another all-night drug store. They make sure to leave clues, especially a trail of footprints in vaseline (from a jar "accidentally" broken in the store), to lead Doc to their hideout. Doc follows the trail using ultraviolet light (because Petroleum jelly glows under ultraviolet light) but approaches the hideout itself in disguise. He is able to penetrate the hideout and successfully avoid the traps set for him but does not manage to rescue Pat or Lorna (as they are not really there).

Moving back to the radio-buoys in the river, Doc and aides (along with Rapid Pace and Hugh McCoy) set out in the Helldiver (Doc's submarine). They follow a trail of hidden buoys out into the Atlantic where they are attacked by another submarine (the buoys are intended to guide the villains' submarine down the river to an abandoned sewer that connects to the Indian's Head Club). They are eventually boarded and Doc Savage is apparently killed (this is a common event in Doc Savage stories). The rest are taken in the villains' submarine to their base in an almost derelict rum row ship. Doc, hanging on to the side of the submarine, sneaks aboard the ship, rescues everyone, recovers a lot of stolen goods and escapes in a lifeboat. A fire he started as a diversion causes an explosion (speculated to be either from the fuel tanks or a stockpile of explosives) and the ship sinks as they leave.

The big brain behind the plot turns out to be Hugh McCoy, who was also Bedford Burgess Gardner (by using a fake beard). Ham's research showed that "Gardner" had made over $1 Billion in the past year by using the gang to kill off opponents and rivals under cover of random crimes. He would then buy out their companies and make his money through stock manipulation.

Rapid Pace, who becomes less cowardly throughout the story, ends up with Lorna Zane.

== Vehicles and gadgets ==
=== Doc Savage ===
Doc Savage wears a special pocket-filled waistcoat to carry assorted useful gadgets. The gadgets used by Savage within this story are:

- Anaesthetic gas in small glass balls
- Black "clover seeds" that detonate like firecrackers when stepped on
- Silk cord and grapple
- Cherry-sized microgrenades
- A thin periscope device
- A dark dust that glows under ultraviolet light
- An ultraviolet lantern
- Goggles to aid seeing ultraviolet in daylight
- Infrared beacons
- Infrared Goggles
- Special all-transparent diving helmet
- Diving suit with integral radio
- Small gas mask

Doc's shoes have special soles of soft rubber to make them even more silent than normal rubber soled shoes.

Several vehicles are used by Doc Savage during Death in Silver. From his hidden garage, he drives an "expensive but unostentacious [blue] roadster", carrying a radio tracking device and radio compass (as well as an automatic transmission and almost silent engine), and an armoured truck disguised as a "shabby laundry truck" complete with fake engine noise and artificially bad suspension.

From his collection stored in the Hidalgo Trading Company warehouse Doc uses a fast, silenced Motorboat, capable of self-righting itself after capsizing with a pop-up gun and tripod. The boat is described as being considered by the navy for the basis of "a fleet of light coastal defense speedsters" (similar to an armed Motor life boat in description). Last, and also from the warehouse, Doc again uses the Helldiver submarine (first seen in The Polar Treasure, June 1933). The Helldiver has many gadgets and experimental devices built into it. In this story the principle modifications are a mechanism to release a chemical similar to squid ink, external-viewing television screens and dial-based sonic devices allowing it to successfully navigate through New York harbor, and its traffic, while submerged.

=== Ham, Monk and Pat ===
Ham and Monk both have their normal equipment of Super Machine Pistols, firing tranquillising "Mercy Bullets," and bulletproof vests. Pat Savage only uses a trick phone that sprays tear gas when spoken into.

=== The Silver Death's-Heads ===
On a few occasions, the gang make use of a combination acid/contact poison in their attempts to kill Doc Savage.

The villains use a mini-submarine, apparently based on a Japanese design recently reported in the American media. It is equipped with a three-inch cannon and strong electromagnets for mooring to other craft. Several divers from this submarine carry electric lances similar to a cattleprod with a lethal voltage (but powered by a cable connected to the submarine).

The silver costumes themselves are described as being made from cloth interwoven with metal from molten silver dollars. The full-head masks cause shadows over the eyes and mouth which resulted in the name "Silver Death's-Heads" in the first place. Although not mentioned in the text of the story, the silver costumes are apparently used because their designer, the scientist Ull, lost his fortune in the Depression speculating on silver (and believes he is entitled to get it back by force).

== Setting ==
This Doc Savage novel is set entirely in New York, including New York City, Westchester County, the rivers and coastal waters. (Most Doc Savage novels started in New York but moved to a more exotic location in the second act.)

=== Chronology ===
- The chronology found in Doc Savage: His Apocalyptic Life by Philip José Farmer places the events of Death in Silver in mid-July 1934.
- The Complete Chronology of Bronze by Rick Lai sets this adventure in mid-May 1933.
- The Adventures of Doc Savage: A Definitive Chronology by Jeff Deischer sets Death in Silver in mid-October 1933

All chronologies concur that Death in Silver transpired over a two-day period.

== Other media ==
Death in Silver was re-published by Bantam Books in paperback in July 1968 with cover art by James Bama. Its backcover blurb reads as follows:

An awesome legion of master criminals launch a devastating series of raids that set the entire east coast of America aflame. Skyscrapers explode, ocean liners disappear, key witnesses are kidnapped and brutally murdered as the holocaust rages. In a desperate race against time Doc Savage attempts to discover the true identity of the twisted brain who rules the silver-costumed marauders -- while the mysterious Ull and his army of hooded assassins move closer to their grim objective of world domination.

Death in Silver was also re-published as a juvenile-market hardcover by Golden Press in 1975. This edition featured cover art by Ben Otero.

In 1973, Marvel Comics adapted Death in Silver as a two-part story in Doc Savage #3 and #4. The adaptation was scripted by Steve Englehart and drawn by Ross Andru, with inks by Tom Palmer. The cover for issue #3 was drawn by Jim Steranko. The first two issues of the Marvel Comics series placed Doc in a contemporary 1970s setting. With the adaptation of Death in Silver the series shifted to the original 1930s setting of the story.

Nostalgia Ventures re-published Death in Silver with The Golden Peril as a quality paperback in January 2007, with original pulp cover art by Paul Baumhofer and Robert Harris, interior illustrations by Paul Orban, and commentary by pulp expert Will Murray.

=== Doc Savage: The Arch Enemy of Evil ===
A sequel entitled Doc Savage: The Arch Enemy of Evil was announced at the conclusion of the first Doc Savage film, 1975's Doc Savage: The Man of Bronze, produced by George Pal.

According to the screenplay by Joe Morhaim that was posted on the Internet, this sequel was based very loosely on Death in Silver, which also featured a deformed, German-speaking supervillain and a man-eating octopus found in the September 1937 pulp novel The Feathered Octopus.

According to contemporary news accounts, this sequel had been filmed in the Lake Tahoe area simultaneously with the principal photography for the first Doc Savage. However, due to the poor reception of the first film, Doc Savage: The Arch Enemy of Evil was never completed or released.
