= The Man of Bronze =

1933 novel by Lester Dent

- Cover of the original March 1933 issue of Doc Savage
- Author: Lester Dent
- Cover artist: Walter M. Baumhofer
- Language: English
- Series: Doc Savage
- Genre: Pulp Adventure
- Publisher: Street & Smith
- Publication date: March 1933
- Publication place: United States
- Media type: Pulp magazine
- Preceded by: N/A
- Followed by: The Land of Terror

The Man of Bronze is a Doc Savage pulp novel by Lester Dent writing under the house name Kenneth Robeson. It was published in March 1933. It was the basis of the 1975 movie Doc Savage: The Man of Bronze starring Ron Ely.

== Summary ==
High above the skyscrapers of New York, Doc Savage engages in deadly combat with the red-fingered survivors of an ancient, lost civilization. Then, with his amazing crew, he journeys to the mysterious “lost valley” to search for a fabulous treasure and to destroy the mysterious Red Death.
