= Modest Stein =

Russian-born American illustrator

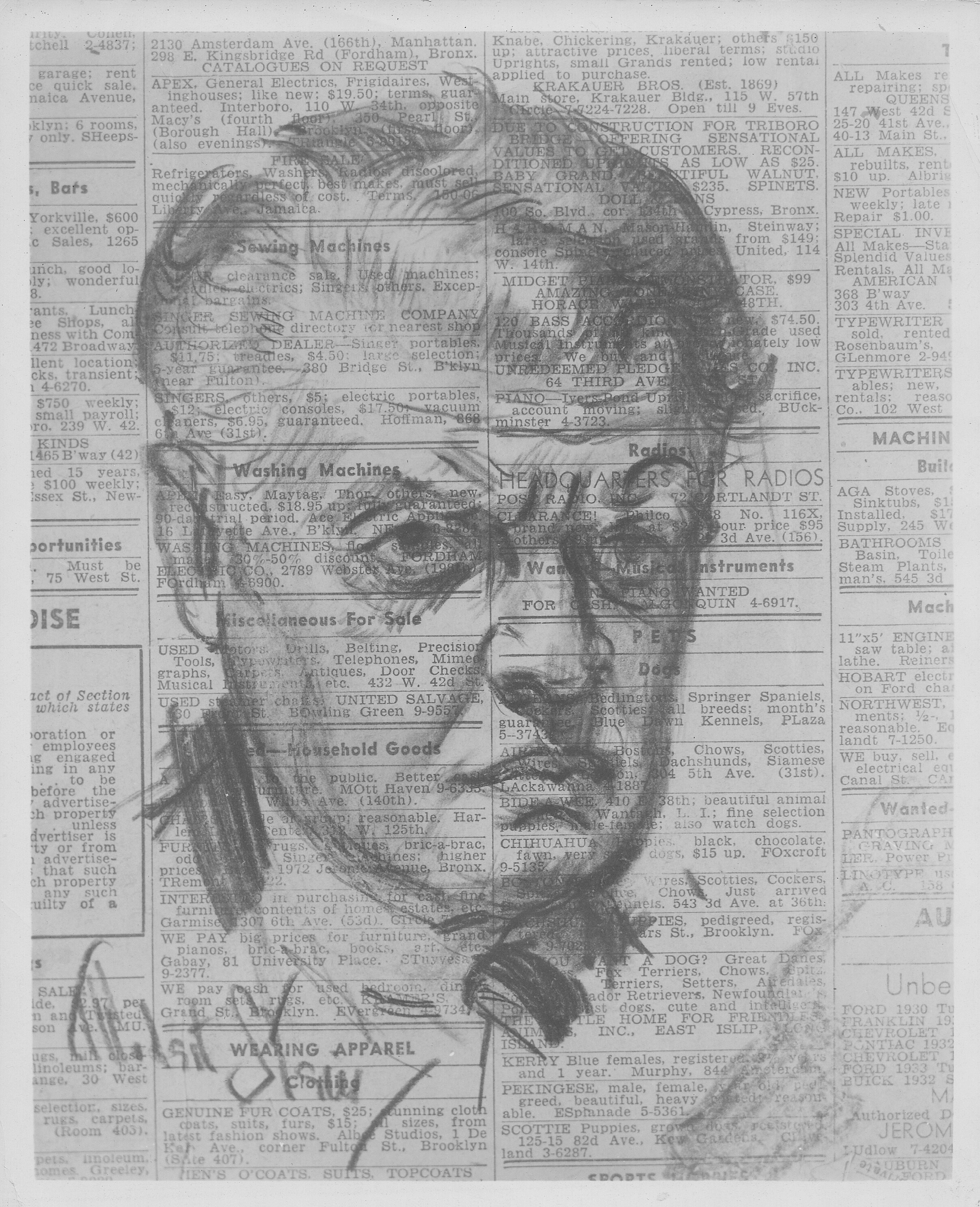
Signed sketch by Modest Stein, likely self-portrait.

Modest Stein (February 22, 1871 – February 26, 1958), born Modest Aronstam, was a Lithuanian Jewish and American illustrator and close associate of the anarchists Alexander Berkman and Emma Goldman. He was Berkman's cousin and intended replacement in the attempted assassination of Henry Clay Frick, an industrialist and union buster, in 1892. Later Stein abandoned active anarchism and became a successful newspaper, pulp magazine, and book illustrator, while continuing to support Berkman and Goldman financially.

== Early life ==
Stein was born Modest Aronstam in Kovno, Lithuania (then in the Russian Empire), on February 22, 1871, and was nicknamed "Modska". His father, Lazar Aronstam, was a pharmacist who moved to Kovno from Vilna. Stein was the cousin of Alexander Berkman (Stein's father and Berkman's mother were siblings), and attended the same gymnasium. The two were similar both physically, being short though muscular, and politically, supporting militant anarchism. Stein was driven to a career in art, which Lazar disapproved of, forcing Stein to sneak downstairs at night to practice drawing or painting when his parents were asleep. At the age of 17, in 1888, Stein left Russia for the United States to be able to pursue his art career; this was soon after Berkman had also left for the US.

Stein arrived in New York City on August 4, 1888, and met up with Berkman soon after arriving. He joined the same Jewish anarchist group, the Pioneers of Liberty. The two accompanied each other everywhere, their friends calling them "the Twins", and considering them "shining lights of the organization". The cousins shared an East Broadway apartment with a third Pioneer named Michelman, when their money allowed, or a park bench when it didn't.

In 1889, the two moved into a four-room apartment on 42nd Street with Berkman's lover Emma Goldman, and her friend Helene Minkin (who would later marry German-American anarchist Johann Most). They formed a commune inspired by Nikolai Chernyshevsky's novel What Is to Be Done?, trying to actualize their shared ideals of women's equality and cooperative living. While the other three worked making clothing in factories or at home, Stein continued trying to become a professional artist, occasionally selling pictures, but mostly funded by the other roommates, or by money sent by his parents in Russia. When he did sell one of his paintings, Stein would sometimes spend the money on "beautiful" luxuries, such as flowers, or fashionable clothes, which made Berkman fume. On one occasion when Stein overspent on a meal, Berkman actually struck him, calling this theft from the revolution.

Emma Goldman began to resent Berkman's strictness, and to be attracted to Stein's more relaxed and artistic character. One day, after posing nude for him, she and Stein became lovers. Goldman did not want to leave Berkman, though, and told him that she could care equally for both men. Though Berkman admitted to possessive tendencies, he attributed them to his "bourgeois background", and worked to overcome them, as the three formed a successful ménage à trois. Minkin was apparently not involved. Their romantic closeness brought the three closer as revolutionaries. Stein, strong enough to be nicknamed "Hercules", despite his shortness, became a strongman for the anarchist movement, and at least once beat up a movement member who had tried to embezzle funds.

For the next years, the group moved their commune several times, while the members worked at different jobs. In late 1890, the three lived in New Haven, Connecticut, with Helene and her sister Anna Minkin, while Berkman worked as a printer's apprentice, the women made dresses, while Stein continued drawing, but also tried making shirts, and his father's trade as a night clerk in a drug store, before all returned to New York. In 1891, Stein moved to Springfield, Massachusetts, where he drew crayon portraits from photos in a photographer's shop. This was relatively successful, so he invited Goldman to take orders, and in 1892, moved to Worcester, Massachusetts, to open the "French Art Studio", where Berkman also joined them to frame. The three continued to live together, passing Berkman and Goldman as a married couple and Stein as Goldman's brother. As their art studio gradually failed, they opened a luncheonette based around Goldman's cooking, which was more successful.

In late June 1892, the three read about the start of the Homestead Strike, an industrial lockout and strike at the Homestead Steel Works in the Pittsburgh area town of Homestead, Pennsylvania. They saw this as a matchless opportunity to spread their anarchist philosophy. Goldman and Berkman quickly shut down the luncheonette, left Stein behind to shut down the art studio, and returned to New York to plan with their fellow anarchists. Initially intending merely to give speeches and spread pamphlets, news of the July 6 riverbank battle between strikers and Pinkerton agents inspired them to more decisive action, to serve as propaganda of the deed, namely to assassinate Henry Clay Frick, main company representative. Berkman made some dynamite bombs, but testing showed them unreliable, so went to Pittsburgh intending to use a pistol and a knife. The dynamite was left behind in Worcester with Stein, "the twin", as a backup plan. Berkman's attempt, on July 23, failed, and he was captured, though Frick was wounded. On July 25, Stein followed to Pittsburgh to finish the job. However a conspirator among the New York anarchists was an informer for the Austrian consul, who informed the Pittsburgh police about the plot, which also leaked to the press in distorted form. So on his way to blow up Frick's house with pockets full of dynamite, Stein—then still called Aronstam—saw a newspaper with a headline warning against "Aaron Stamm" as a Berkman conspirator. He became frightened, dumped the explosives in an outhouse, and returned to New York.

To avoid police, Stein spent several months in Detroit with anarchists including Robert Reitzel, where he worked with an engraving firm, but returned to the New York in the fall of 1892, when prosecutors determined they did not have enough evidence to charge either Stein or Goldman.

== Artistic success ==
Berkman did not reveal his co-conspirators, and was sentenced to 22 years imprisonment. Even so, Goldman continued to give speeches advocating anarchism, and was imprisoned for a year in 1893. During this time, Stein turned away from active anarchism, though he regularly sent parcels to his friends in jail. Instead he became a successful pen and ink artist for the New York World, The Sun, and other New York newspapers. After Goldman was released in 1894, Stein moved in with her and her most recent lover, Austrian anarchist Edward Brady, for over a year, but did not resume his sexual relationship with her. In 1895, Stein was earning enough as an artist to be able to pay for Goldman's trip to Austria to become a nurse, send her regular money there, and pay for her ticket back. When she returned in 1896, he had completely stopped attending anarchist meetings, and only rarely wrote to Berkman in prison. His interests had become artistic rather than political; he spent all his leisure time at art auctions, and every few months would furnish a new studio with hangings, vases, canvases, or carpets, only to lose interest in another few months. The apartment Goldman shared with Brady was decorated with items originally from such studios.

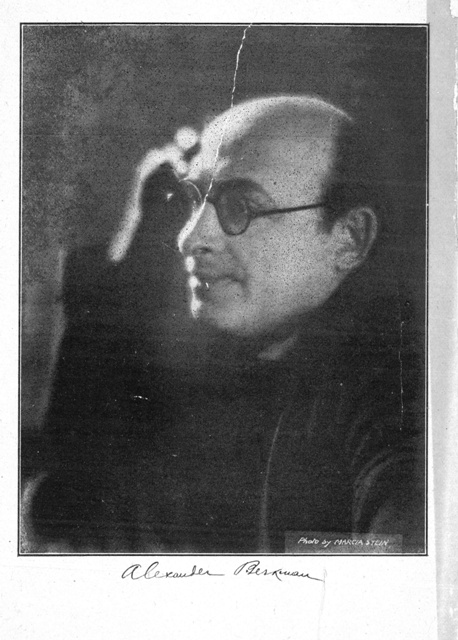
Photograph of Alexander Berkman, by Marcia Stein, c. 1920, signed by both.

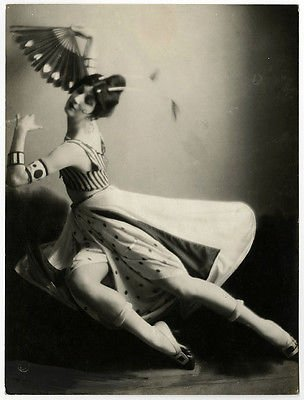
1918 photograph of American dancer Desiree Lubovska by Marcia Mishkin Stein

Stein married photographer Marcia Mishkin on June 18, 1899. She was born in Minsk, Russian Empire, on September 21, 1880, and emigrated to New York in 1885 along with her brother, Herman Mishkin. Both siblings became interested in the new art of photography, with Herman eventually becoming the official photographer for the Metropolitan Opera from 1905 to 1932. (In 1907, Herman Mishkin became father of the Steins' nephew Leo Mishkin, who became a renowned theater, film, and television critic.) Marcia began work as a commercial portrait photographer in the mid-1890s, before marrying Stein. Her career significantly expanded in 1919, when she was hired by the French government to publicize a season of New York art and theater. Magazines such as Theatre and Vanity Fair then began publishing her photos of stage performers.

The Steins' only child, a daughter, Luba, was born in 1902. In 1904, the three of them traveled to Kovno to visit Stein's family; the same year, the New York World sent Stein to East Asia as an illustrator to cover the Russo-Japanese War. Though he hosted Berkman at his home regularly from his release in 1906, in 1907, Stein changed his and his family's last name to Stein, to protect them from association with the attempt on Frick's life. To similarly protect Stein and his family, both Goldman and Berkman referred to him as "Fedya" in their memoirs, though Stein would try to dissuade Goldman from mentioning him even this way. Goldman would write that by 1908, "Fedya" "had married, had a child, and disappeared from [her] ken". In the 1910s, Stein found even greater success as an illustrator for periodicals such as Argosy, and drew numerous covers for other pulp magazines including The Cavalier, All-Story Weekly, and People's Favorite Magazine.

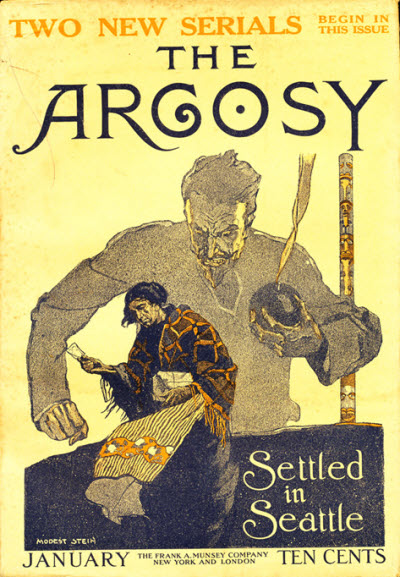
Argosy cover, January 1912, by Stein

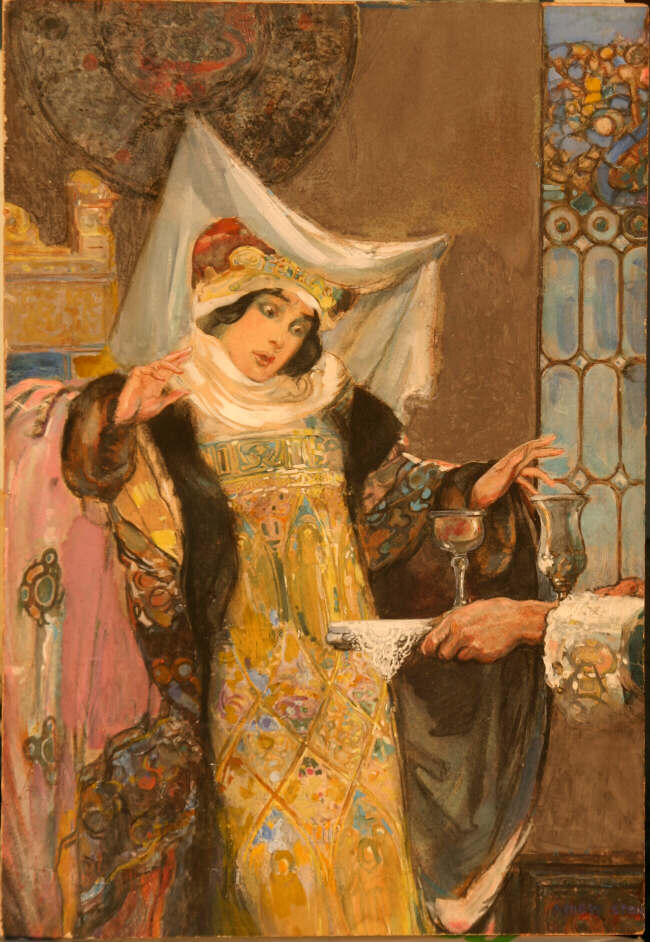
Stein painting for cover of The Cavalier magazine June 7, 1913

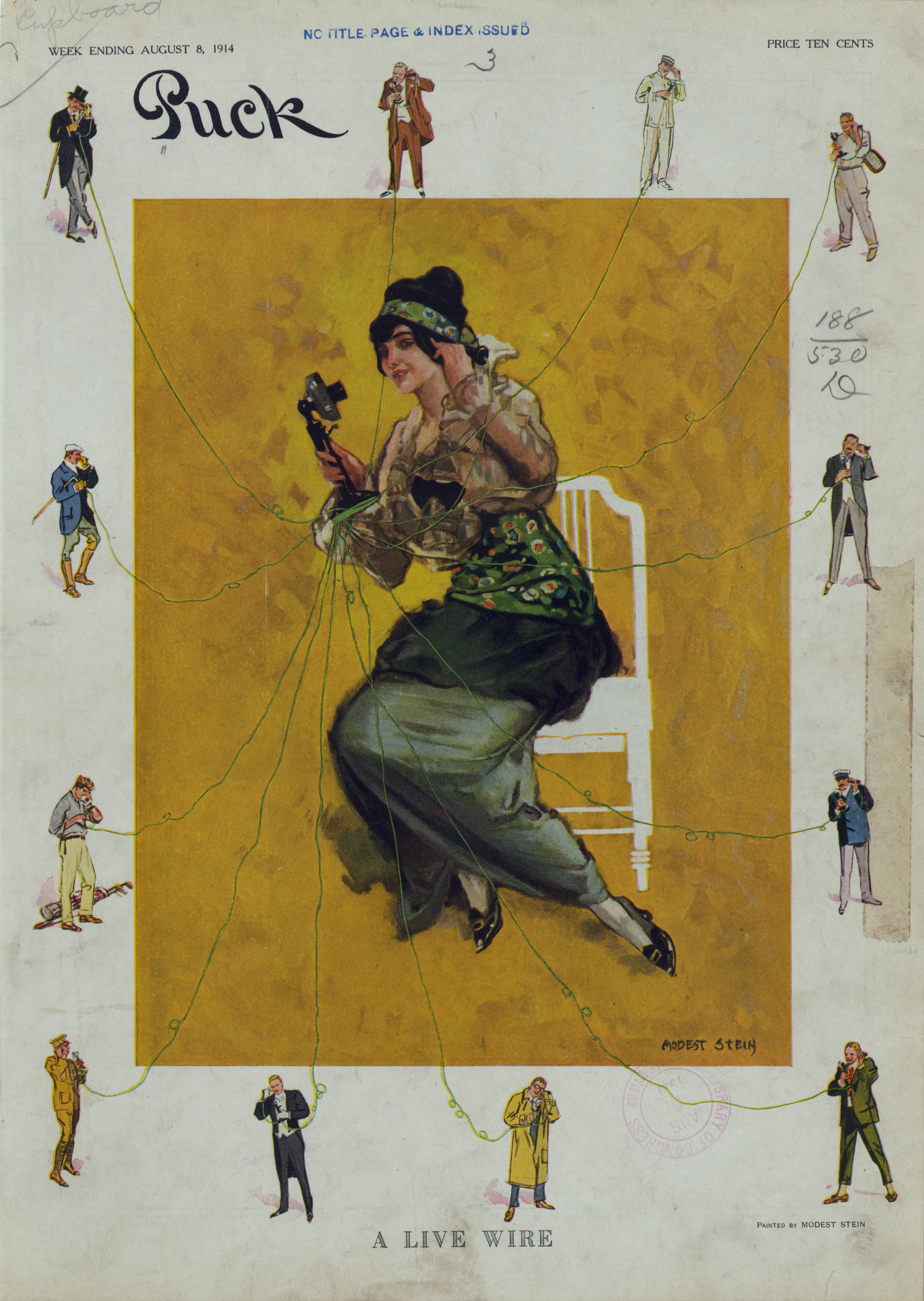
Puck cover, August 8, 1914, painted by Stein

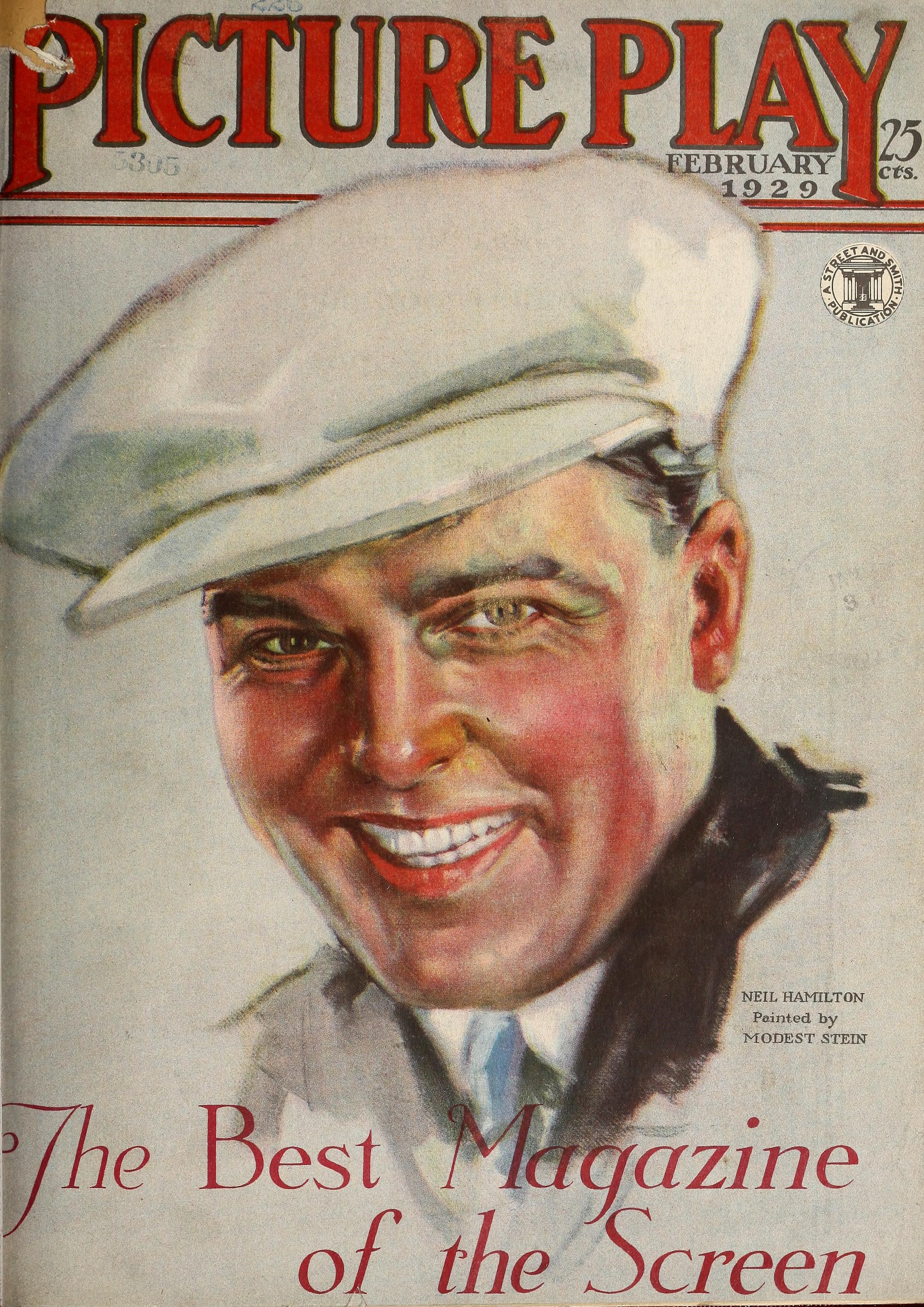
Neil Hamilton, Picture Play magazine cover, February 1929, painted by Stein

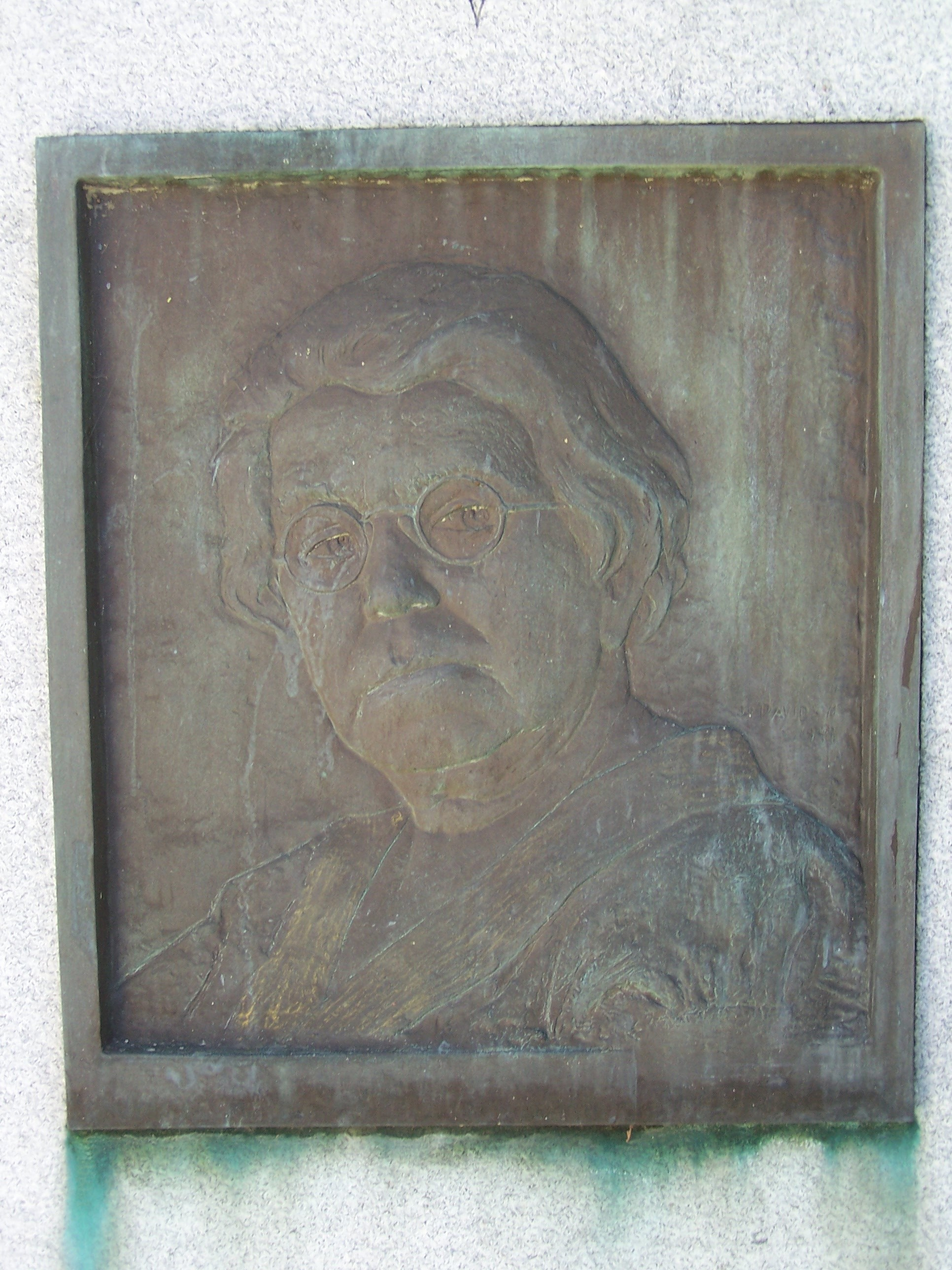
Emma Goldman's gravestone plaque, by Jo Davidson from likeness by Stein

Marcia Stein died February 5, 1927. In 1929, with his wife dead, and his daughter grown, Stein traveled to visit Berkman in Paris, and Goldman in St. Tropez, for her sixtieth birthday. In 1930, though, he refused to attend Berkman's symbolic sixtieth birthday celebration in New York (Berkman was legally barred from attending). In 1931, Stein visited the Soviet Union, which made him less sympathetic to the Bolshevik Revolution. Also in 1931 and 1932, Stein made multiple visits to southern France bringing large sums of money as gifts for Berkman and Goldman, essentially supporting them as their incomes decreased. From 1933 to 1934, Berkman refused Stein's support, but in 1935, Stein visited again, and Berkman was persuaded to accept a monthly stipend. When Berkman committed suicide in 1936, Stein continued supporting Berkman's last lover Emmy Eckstein.

When Goldman died in 1940, Stein drew a likeness of her for the bronze plaque on her monument, which was eventually sculpted by Jo Davidson. Stein continued to be a successful artist, of portraits and magazine covers for Street and Smith magazines, including Doc Savage, through the 1940s. He even spent a few years in Hollywood as a graphic artist. He died in Booth Memorial Hospital in Flushing, Queens, New York City, on February 26, 1958.
