= The Phantom Detective =

Pulp hero magazine

- Third issue of The Phantom Detective (June 1933)

Publication information
- Publisher: Thrilling Publications
- First appearance: The Phantom Detective
- Created by: D. L. Champion

In-story information
- Alter ego: Richard Curtis Van Loan
- Supporting character of: Frank Havens; Muriel Havens; Steve Huston; Chip Dorlan; Jerry Lannigan
- Abilities: Excellent detective, master of disguise and escape.

The Phantom Detective was the second pulp hero magazine published, after The Shadow. The first issue was released in February 1933, a month before Doc Savage, which was released in March 1933. The title continued to be released until 1953, with a total 170 issues. This is the third highest number of issues for a character pulp, after The Shadow, which had 325 issues, and Doc Savage, which had 181. In western titles, Texas Rangers would have around 212 issues of their main character, known as the Lone Wolf.

== Publication history ==
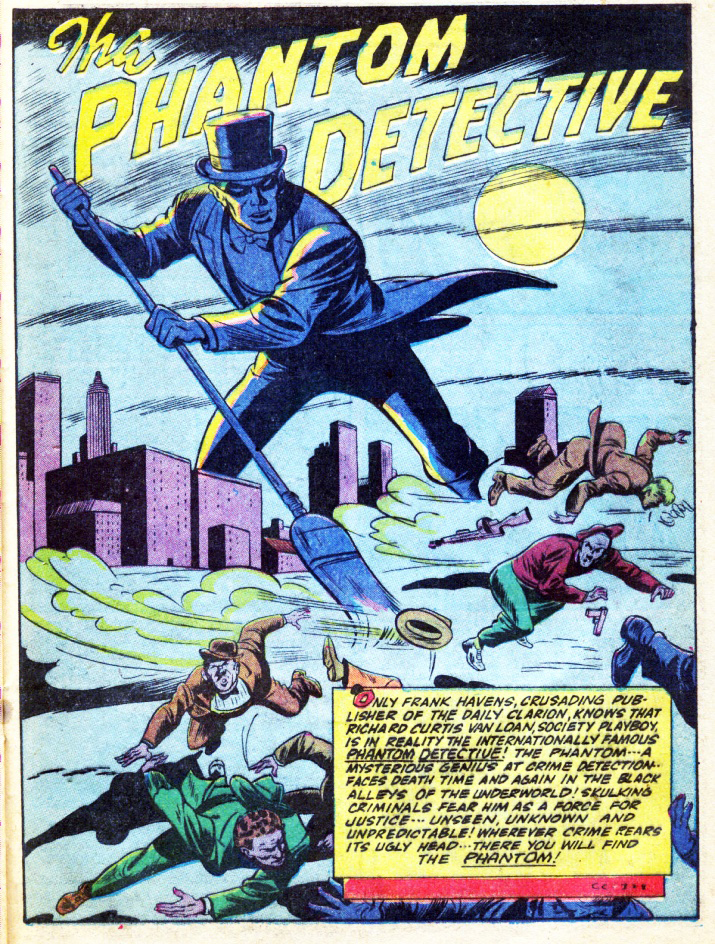
The Phantom Detective in America's Best Comics #26 (1948)

The series was published by Ned Pines' Thrilling (also known as Better or Standard) Publishing. Ned Pines had a comic book imprint, which collectors usually refer to as Nedor Comics, and The Phantom Detective had a series in their title Thrilling Comics #53-70 from 1946 to 1949 as well as America's Best Comics #26 in 1948.

Stories were credited to several pseudonyms. The first eleven Phantom Detective stories were published under the Better house pseudonym of "G. Wayman Jones", and were largely written by D. L. Champion, a.k.a. Jack D'arcy. The rest were published under the pseudonym "Robert Wallace". These were largely written by Edwin V. Burkholder, Norman A. Daniels (36+), Anatole F. Feldman, Charles Greenberg, George A. MacDonald, Laurence Donovan and C. S. Montanye. Less frequent contributors included Paul Chadwick, Norvell W. Page, Paul Ernst, Emile C. Tepperman, Henry Kuttner, Ray Cummings, Ralph Oppenheim and others. Ryerson Johnson is credited with #46, The Silent Death.

There have been several reprints of Phantom Detective stories over the years. Soft porn publisher Corinth Books released the most, with 20 titles.

== Character overview ==
The Phantom (as he was called in the stories) is actually the wealthy Richard Curtis Van Loan. In the first few issues of the title, the Phantom is introduced as a world-famous detective, whose true identity is only known by one man—Frank Havens, the publisher of the Clarion newspaper. Richard Curtis Van Loan is orphaned at an early age, but inherits wealth. Before World War I, he leads the life of an idle playboy, but during the war he becomes a pilot and downs many German planes.

After the war, Van Loan has a difficult time returning to his old life. At the suggestion of his father's friend, Havens, he sets out to solve a crime that had stumped the police. After solving it, he decides he has found his calling.

He trains himself in all facets of detection and forensics, and becomes a master of disguise and escape. He makes a name for himself as the Phantom, whom all police agencies around the world know and respect. When dealing with law enforcement officials he carries a platinum badge in the shape of a domino mask as proof of his true identity. The initial stories were less about a detective than an adventurer using disguise and lucky escapes to conclude his cases.

In one issue, Havens installs a red beacon on the roof of the Clarion building, which he turns on when he needs to see the Phantom. (This served as an inspiration for Batman's Bat-Signal; two early Batman editors, Jack Schiff and Mort Weisinger, got their start editing The Phantom Detective under editor-in-chief Leo Margulies.)

Other people in Van Loan's life include Muriel Havens, Frank Havens' daughter, with whom he is in love, and Clarion reporter Steve Huston. Laurence Donovan introduced a kid sidekick named Chip Dorlan in the 1939 novel, The Sampan Murders. After Pearl Harbor, Chip joins the Army as an Intelligence officer, returning briefly to the series after the war. Van Loan's former mechanic and pilot, Jerry Lannigan, assists him in several cases, as do others from time to time.

The Phantom employs several alternate identities, including Lester Cornwell and Dr. Paul Bendix, a chemist.

The pseudonym "Robert Wallace" was coined to evoke popular British thriller novelist Edgar Wallace, and was also used on short stories and novelettes not featuring the Phantom.

== Cultural references ==
The early episodes of Lee Falk's The Phantom newspaper strip strongly resemble the Phantom Detective. Abruptly, Falk abandoned this tack for the exotic adventure approach, abandoning his Manhattan locale and the Phantom's original identity of playboy Jimmy Wells.

== Reprints and continuations ==
The property slid into the public domain when the copyright was not renewed, allowing others to bring the character back into print.

From 2002, Adventure House has been reprinting the stories of The Phantom Detective. As of 2018, 133 of the 170 novels have been reprinted, 126 of them as replicas, including the cover and additional contents, of the original Phantom Detective pulp issues.

In 2006 Wildside Press LLC printed the "first new Phantom Story in 50 years": The Phantom's Phantom, which takes place in 1953 after the original pulp series ends. It was written in the first person, which allows an in-depth study of the Phantom's personality that never occurred in the pulps.

In 2016, Airship 27 Productions published a new anthology featuring five original Phantom Detective stories by Gary Lovisi, Gene Moyers, Whit Howland and Robert Ricci.
