= Western Story Magazine =

US magazine

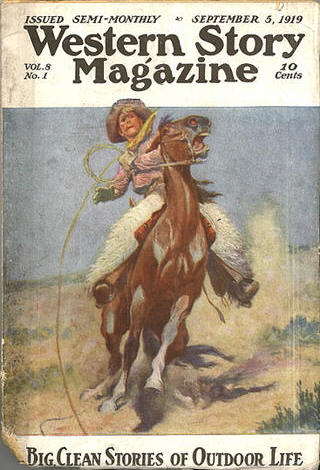
Cover of Western Story Magazine vol. 8, no. 1

Western Story Magazine was a pulp magazine published by Street & Smith, which ran from 1919 to 1949. It was the first of numerous pulp magazines devoted to Western fiction. In its heyday, Western Story Magazine was one of the most successful pulp magazines; in 1921 the magazine was selling over half a million copies each issue. The headquarters were located in New York City.

== History ==
Western Story Magazine began when Street & Smith executive Henry Ralston decided to convert one of the company's nickel weeklies, New Buffalo Bill Weekly, into a pulp. Ralston installed Frank Blackwell as editor of the new magazine. The magazine attracted a number of famous Western authors, including Charles Alden Seltzer, H. Bedford-Jones, Stewart Edward White, W. Ryerson Johnson and William MacLeod Raine. The November 25, 1920 issue was the first issue to carry the work of Max Brand (writing under the pseudonym George Owen Baxter). Brand's work would dominate the magazine in the next decade; he would write dozens of stories for Western Story Magazine both under his own name and several pseudonyms. Western Story Magazine was also prominent in publishing material by women writers, including B. M. Bower and Cherry Wilson.

In the 1930s, the publication's roster of authors expanded to include Walt Coburn, William Colt MacDonald and W. C. Tuttle, while noted pulp illustrator Walter M. Baumhofer contributed several covers.

In the late 1930s, Blackwell was succeeded as editor by John Burr, who edited the magazine until it ceased publication in 1949.
