= William G. Bogart =

American novelist

William Gibson Bogart (June 17, 1903 – July 20, 1977) was an American pulp fiction writer. He is best known for writing several Doc Savage novels, under the pseudonym Kenneth Robeson.

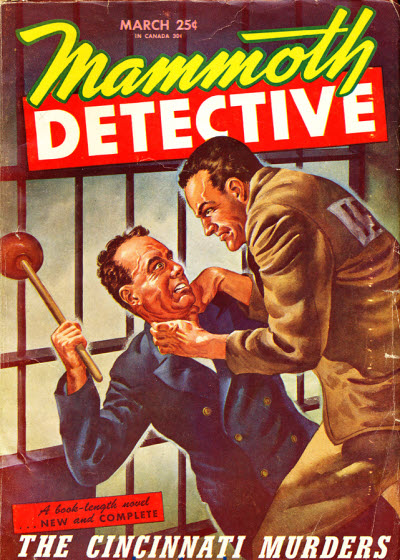
Bogart's "Johnny Saxon" novella "The Cincinnati Murders" was the cover story for the March 1946 issue of Mammoth Detective.

In addition to the Doc Savage novels, Bogart published works in many genres under his own name. He also created the detective Johnny Saxon, and featured him in several novels.

== Doc Savage novels ==
- World's Fair Goblin (co-written with Lester Dent)
- Hex
- The Angry Ghost (co-written with Lester Dent)
- The Spotted Men
- The Flying Goblin
- Tunnel Terror
- The Awful Dynasty (co-written with Lester Dent)
- Bequest of Evil (co-written with Dent)
- The Magic Forest
- Fire and Ice (co-written with Dent)
- Death in Little Houses
- The Disappearing Lady
- Target for Death
- The Death Lady (Doc Savage)
