= Leo Mishkin =

Leo Mishkin (January 22, 1907 – December 27, 1980) was an American film, theater, and television critic of the mid-20th century. He was also a long-time member of the New York Film Critics Circle and served at least one term as chair.

== Biography ==
He was born on January 22, 1907, to Herman Mishkin and Rose Kissin. His father was the photographer for the Metropolitan Opera from 1905 to 1932.

He worked as a publicity director for Rex Ingram, a silent film director, and as a journalist for the Chicago Tribune’s Paris outpost in the late 1920s, and covered Charles Lindbergh's arrival in Paris in 1927.

He was a critic for the New York Morning Telegraph from 1934 until 1971, when he retired.

He died on December 27, 1980, in Santa Monica, California.

== Legacy ==
The American Heritage Center at the University of Wyoming holds an archive of Mishkin's papers.
