= Herman Mishkin =

Russian-American photographer

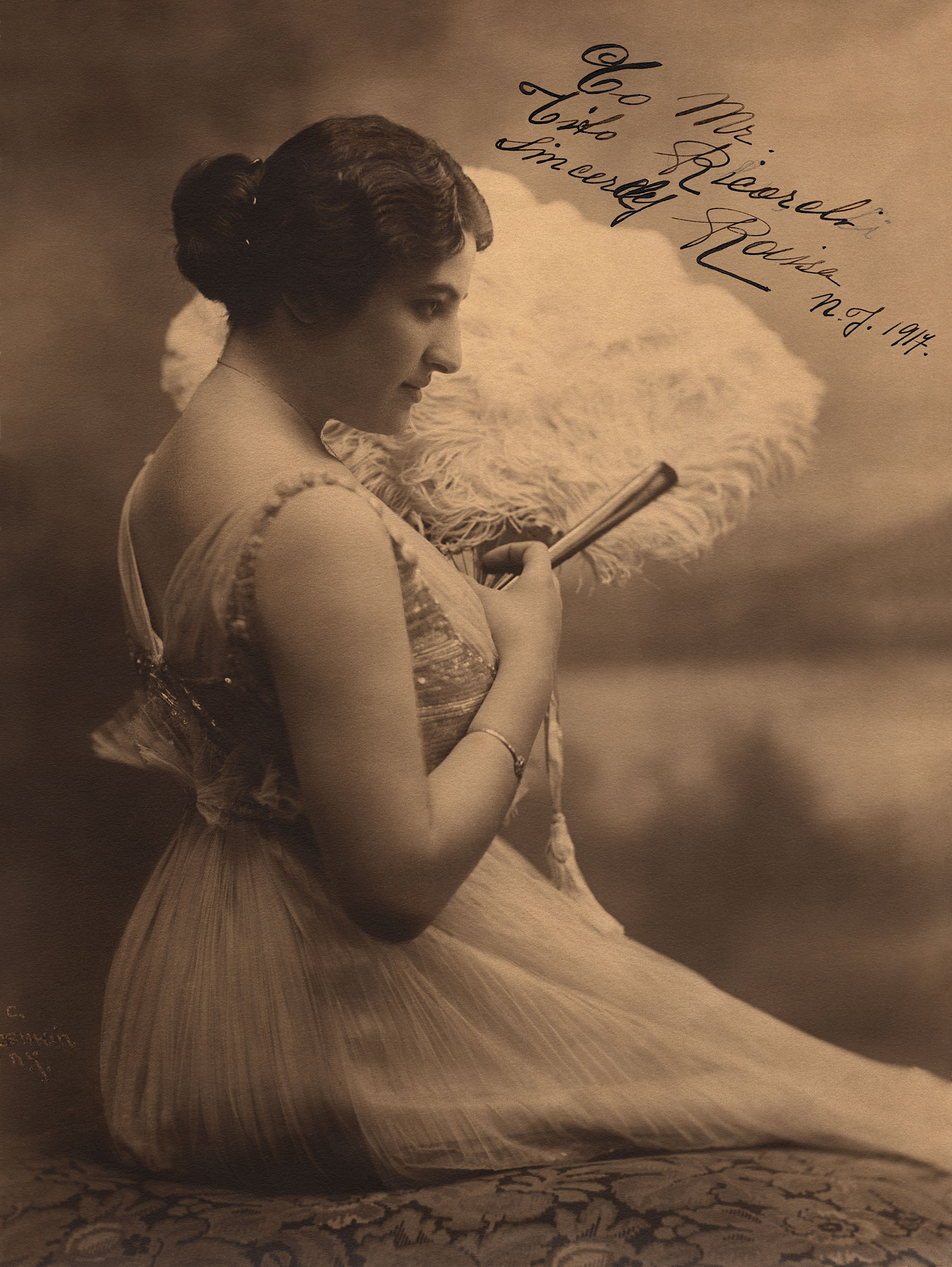
Photograph by Mishkin of Rosa Raisa, 1917

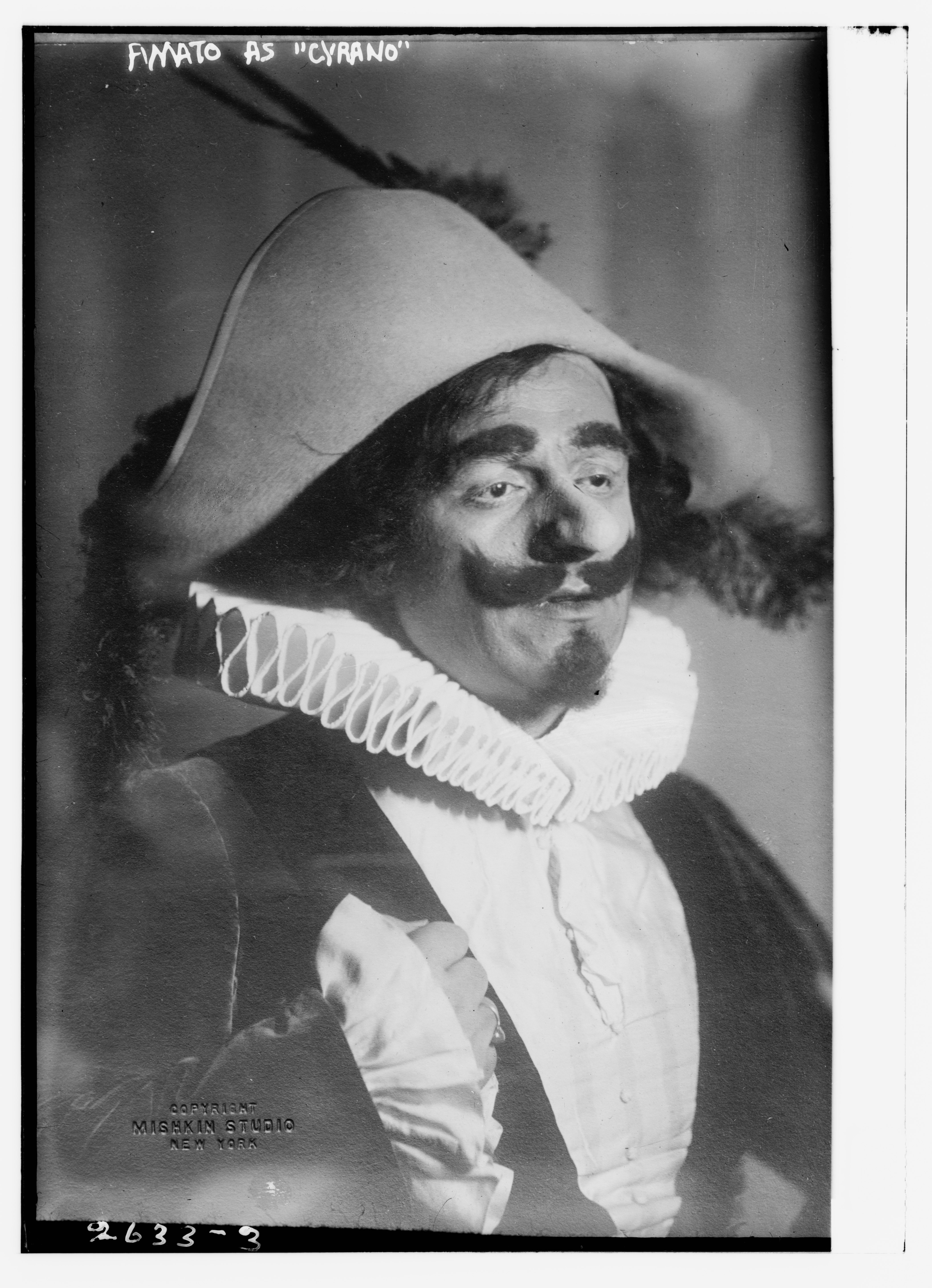
Pasquale Amato in Cyrano, circa 1913. Photo Herman Mishkin.

Herman Mishkin (March 1870 – February 6, 1948) was a Russian-American photographer in Manhattan, New York City. He specialized in photographing opera singers. Mishkin was born in Minsk, Russian Empire in March 1870. He migrated to the United States in 1885. He bought a camera and started taking photographs in the 1880s. He married and had a son, Leo Mishkin. He died on February 6, 1948.
