= John Nanovic =

Editor

John Lenord Nanovic (1906–2001) was an author and editor who was especially influential at Street & Smith where he edited The Shadow and wrote the initial outline for Doc Savage.
