= Alan Hathway =

American novelist

Alan Bonnell Hathway (May 22, 1906 – April 15, 1977) was an editor at Newsday, a daily newspaper for the Long Island suburbs of New York City, from the early 1940s until 1970. He began as city editor, then became managing editor and eventually executive editor. He was often characterized as an old-style newspaperman, similar to those in the play The Front Page.

In the 1930s and 1940s, Hathway was also a pulp fiction writer. He wrote several Doc Savage novels under the pseudonym Kenneth Robeson in the early 1940s.

During Hathway's tenure as Managing Editor at Newsday, the future Pulitzer prize-winning author Robert Caro worked in his newsroom. In his memoir, Caro credited Hathway for being a major positive influence on his research practice, particularly for his advice to “Turn every page. Never assume anything. Turn every goddam page.”

== Doc Savage novels ==
- The Devil's Playground (January 1941)
- The Headless Men (June 1941)
- The Mindless Monsters (September 1941)
- The Rustling Death (January 1942)
