= Lawrence Donovan =

American writer (1885–1948)

Lawrence Louis Donovan (July 1885 – March 11, 1948) was an American pulp fiction writer who wrote nine Doc Savage novels under the pseudonym Kenneth Robeson, a pen name that was used by other writers of the same publishing house. However, there are nine Doc Savage novels duly credited to Donovan, published between November 1935 and July 1937.

== Early life and career ==
Born in Cincinnati, Ohio in July 1885, he worked as a press feeder in Covington, Kentucky before becoming a newspaperman. Donovan later became a copyreader and journalist for the San Francisco Call-Bulletin and the Vancouver Sun, as well as city editor for the Spokane Chronicle. During the latter 20s, he began contributing to myriad pulp magazines ranging from the dignified Argosy to the bizarre Zeppelin Stories. Prior to that, he appears to have toiled in Hollywood. Family legend has it that Donovan was offered the chance to script the 1925 silent screen version of Ben Hur, but went off on one of his infamous drinking binges, blowing the chance forever. That same year, his vignette, "The Old Copy Desk", was published in The Saturday Evening Post.

== Novels & Other Writing ==
Donovan broke into pulps in 1929 via the story "Brick Sacrifices" written for Street & Smith's Sport Story Magazine. By 1933, he was writing for Street & Smith editor John L. Nanovic, contributing short stories to the back pages of The Shadow, Doc Savage, Nick Carter, Pete Rice and others, sometimes under the house name of Walter Wayne. In the pages of Street & Smith's Detective Story Magazine, Clues and Western Story Magazine, he employed the bylines "Patrick Everett" and "Patrick Lawrence"—both cobbled together from the names of his two sons. Donovan wrote virtually the entire first issue of Street & Smith's Movie Action, converting to novelettes such then-current film scripts as Tumbling Tumbleweeds, The Crime of Dr. Crespi, Bodyguard, Powder-Smoke Range, The Last Days of Pompeii, Drake the Pirate and Moonlight on the Prairie under his own name.

In 1935, Nanovic asked him to write Doc Savage novels under the house name of "Kenneth Robeson", alternating with originating author, Lester Dent. After producing nine Doc Savage novels, Donovan drew on his nautical background to create Captain John Fury for Street & Smith's The Skipper under the house name "Wallace Brooker", after which he also launched The Whisperer, writing as "Clifford Goodrich". When those magazines folded in the aftermath of the Recession of 1937–38, Donovan continued both characters in the back pages of The Shadow and Doc Savage, and began ghosting the adventures of Pete Rice in Wild West Weekly as "Austin Gridley". His "Boxcar" Reilly character began appearing in Crime Busters in 1937, as did postal inspectors Joe Bimbo and Howdy Hawks, whom he had originated for The Feds. After a liquor-induced falling out with John Nanovic in 1938, Donovan moved over to the rival Thrilling Publications, where he began ghosting the adventures of The Phantom Detective under the house name of "Robert Wallace". There he created The Phantom's teenage sidekick, Chip Dorlan. Donovan ultimately ghosted most of the Thrilling heroes, including G-man Dan Fowler in G-Men Detective, playboy Dewidd Darknell in The Masked Detective and blind district attorney Anthony Quinn in The Black Bat. One of his 1942 Black Bat novels, "The Murder Prophet, was a rewrite of “The Crime Prophet", an unpublished Whisperer novel.

His other pen names included "Don Lewis", "Don Lawrence" and "Larry Dunn", by which Donovan concealed his identity in the lurid Spicy Detective Stories and sister magazines like Spicy Western Stories. His John P. "Pa" Howdy stories ran in Detective Fiction Weekly and Clues in the 1930s, and in G-Men Detective a decade later. Joe Bunt appeared in Popular Detective, as did Wildcat Martin, who also ran in Exciting Detective. Strangely, three of his Doc Savage novels were "adapted" as early Superman comic book stories. Donovan is also believed to have written for radio.

== Personal life ==
Concrete information on Donovan's origins is sparse. He claimed to have been born in County Cork, Ireland, but although his parents were Irish, U. S. records do not support this assertion. Although he invariably spelled his first name as "Laurence", it might have been "Lawrence" at birth. Mysteriously, The Shadow author Walter B. Gibson remembered that Donovan changed his name from something like "Donegal".

Donovan married Ruth Johnson in 1924. They were living in Vancouver, British Columbia in 1927, when their son, Laurence Junior, was born. Another son, Patrick, came along a year later while the family was living in Spokane, Washington. The family moved often, residing in Flushing, New York; Southampton, Long Island; and Old Greenwich, Connecticut before relocating to Florida, where they lived in St. Augustine and later, Fort Pierce. Donovan deserted Ruth in the late 1930s, and subsequently divorced her. A reported earlier marriage produced a third son, name unknown. A seasoned sailor, Donovan may have belonged to the Merchant Marines in his youth.

Donovan died in seclusion in Manhattan, New York on Thursday, March 11, 1948. His last known published story was "Redheads Kill Easy" for Popular Publications' New Detective, February 1952. It was a final "Pa" Howdy story.

His son, Laurence L. Donovan. Jr. (1927–2001), continued the family tradition by teaching literature and creative writing at the University of Miami, and becoming one of Florida's foremost poets. His Dog Island and Other Florida Poems was published posthumously in 2003. He was also a renowned graphic artist and printmaker, whose work was prominent in the Coconut Grove art scene in the 1960s. His brother Patrick Donovan worked as a law enforcement officer in New Jersey.

== Doc Savage novels by Donovan ==
- Doc Savage, Vol. VI, No. 3, "Murder Melody" (Nov 1935) The sky over the Northwest is filled with strange floating men playing a weird melody of death.
- Doc Savage, Vol. VI, No. 5, "Murder Mirage" (Jan 1936) A blizzard in July and a dead woman etched in glass lead Doc and crew to Saharan tombs guarded by Bedouins.
- Doc Savage, Vol. VII, No. 2, "The Men Who Smiled No More" (Apr 1936) Even Doc Savage is stricken helpless by the terrifying menace of The Death's Head Grin.
- Doc Savage, Vol. VII, No. 4, "The Haunted Ocean" (Jun 1936) An awesome power haunts the sea, paralyzes New York City and brings the most powerful nations of the world to their knees.
- Doc Savage, Vol. VII, No. 5, "The Black Spot" (Jul 1936) All the guests were dressed as gangsters but their millionaire host was dead in the library with a black spot over his heart.
- Doc Savage, Vol. VIII, No. 1, "Cold Death" (Sep 1936) Doc Savage meets Var, who wields an unstoppable destructive ray: the deadly Cold Light.
- Doc Savage, Vol. VIII, No. 5, "Land of Long Juju" (Jan 1937) The ruthless power of The Shimba threatened to overthrow the good and gentle ruler of an African kingdom.
- Doc Savage, Vol. IX, No. 3, "Mad Eyes" (May 1937) In the space of twenty-four hours, the menace of the slithering madness struck in all its fury!
- Doc Savage, Vol. IX, No. 5, "He Could Stop the World" (Jul 1937) The world was imperiled by a terrifying, malevolent force that had the power to change men's minds.
