= Harold A. Davis =

American novelist

Harold Arvine Davis (January 16, 1903 – January 8, 1955) was a pulp fiction writer who wrote several Doc Savage novels under the pseudonym Kenneth Robeson.

== Doc Savage novels ==
- The King Maker
- Dust of Death
- The Land of Fear
- The Golden Peril
- The Living Fire Menace
- The Mountain Monster
- The Munitions Master
- The Green Death
- Merchants of Disaster
- The Crimson Serpent
- The Purple Dragon
- Devils of the Deep
- The Exploding Lake
