= W. Ryerson Johnson =

American novelist

- Born: Walter Ryerson Johnson; October 19, 1901; Divernon, Illinois
- Died: May 24, 1995 (aged 93); Florida
- Occupation: Author
- Known for: Western pulp fiction, Doc Savage novels, children's books

Walter Ryerson Johnson (October 19, 1901 – May 24, 1995) was a 20th-century American pulp fiction writer and editor. He wrote in many genres, but is probably best known at having been one of the men who wrote Doc Savage novels, under the pseudonym Kenneth Robeson. He also published works under the names "Matthew Blood" and "Peter Field".

== Biography ==
Johnson earned a degree in foreign commerce.

His first known published work was a short story in the February 1923 issue of Detective Tales. It wasn't until 1929 that he started appearing regularly in the pulps. He wrote numerous western stories for pulps like Western Story Magazine, Ace-High Magazine, Cowboy Stories, and Star Western. A number of the Star Western stories featured hero Len Siringo.

He wrote horror stories for Dime Mystery Magazine, Detective Tales and other pulps. He also wrote several crime novels, two under his own name, the others under various pseudonyms. These novels include Naked in the Streets (Red Seal, 1952), Lady in Dread (Gold Medal, 1955); under the joint pseudonym Matthew Blood (together with Davis Dresser) The Avenger (Gold Medal, 1952), Death Is a Lovely Dame (Gold Medal, 1954); under Dresser's pseudonym Brett Halliday Dolls Are Deadly (Torquil/Dodd, 1960), Killers from the Keys (Torquil/Dodd, 1961) and more under the house name Robert Wallace. Some of his crime novels were translated into French and German.

In 1963, he wrote a series of juvenile novels, the Bob Blake Adventures, which had 4 volumes: The Trail of the Moaning Ghost, The Trail of the Witchwood Treasure, The Trail of the Golden Feather, and The Trail of the Deadly Image. These appeared under his own name.

Johnson also wrote historical novels and contributed to Encyclopædia Britannica.

== Doc Savage novels ==
- Land of Always-Night
- The Fantastic Island
- The Motion Menace
