= Kenneth Robeson =

Kenneth Robeson was the house name used by Street & Smith publications as the writer of their popular characters Doc Savage and later Avenger. Lester Dent wrote most of the Doc Savage stories; others credited under the Robeson name included:

- William G. Bogart
- Evelyn Coulson
- Harold A. Davis
- Lawrence Donovan
- Philip José Farmer
- Alan Hathway
- W. Ryerson Johnson
- Will Murray
- Ron Goulart

All 24 of the Avenger stories were written by Paul Ernst, using the Robeson house name. Robeson was credited on the cover of The Avenger magazine as "the creator of Doc Savage."
