= Walter M. Baumhofer =

American illustrator (1904–1987)

- Born: Walter Martin Baumhofer; November 1, 1904; Brooklyn, New York, United States
- Died: September 23, 1987 (aged 82); United States
- Known for: Illustration, painting

Walter Martin Baumhofer (November 1, 1904 – September 23, 1987) was an American illustrator notable for his cover paintings seen on the pulp magazines of Street & Smith and other publishers.

Baumhofer's parents emigrated from Germany. His father Henry (Heinrich) came from Oldenburg, his mother Marie from Hanover. He was born and grew up in Brooklyn where his father had become a clerk at a local coffee company and then, in 1918, janitor at an apartment building, a situation which enabled the family to live rent free. Graduating from high school in 1922, Baumhofer went on a scholarship to Pratt Institute, where he studied under Dean Cornwell and H. Winfield Scott. On June 28, 1935, he married the equally accomplished illustration artist Alureda Leach Baumhofer (b Aug. 20, 1903; d. 1992), nicknamed Rita or Pete. She received a Certificate in Costume and Commercial Illustration from Pratt Institute in 1925, where she met Walter. She was most active with art déco fashion and commercial illustrations in the 1920s and 1930s

== Illustrations ==
In 1925, he began drawing interior illustrations for Adventure magazine. Scott suggested he submit cover paintings to pulps, and the following year his first pulp cover appeared on Danger Trail. He moved on to do covers for Doc Savage, Pete Rice, Dime Mystery, Dime Detective and The Spider. Joining the American Artists agency in 1937, he sold to slick magazines, including The American Magazine, The American Weekly, Collier's, Cosmopolitan, Esquire, McCalls, Redbook and Woman's Day. In the 1950s he worked for men's adventure magazines, such as Argosy, Sports Afield and True.

== Fine art ==
In 1945, Baumhofer and his wife Alureda moved to Long Island. Retiring from freelance magazine illustration, he created portraits, landscapes and Western scenes for fine art galleries. With the decline of pulps and reader's magazines in the late 1950s and early 1960s, due to the rise of the TV as evening entertainment, Baumhofer's illustrations lost its markets. Very few illustration work is known for the 1960s and 1970s. At the end of his life in the 1980s, he was rediscovered as a celebrated master of pulp and illustration art.

== Archives ==
His legacy, documents, correspondence, drawings, some artwork, is preserved in the D.B. Dowd Modern Graphic History Library of Washington University in St. Louis (West Campus).

== Gallery ==
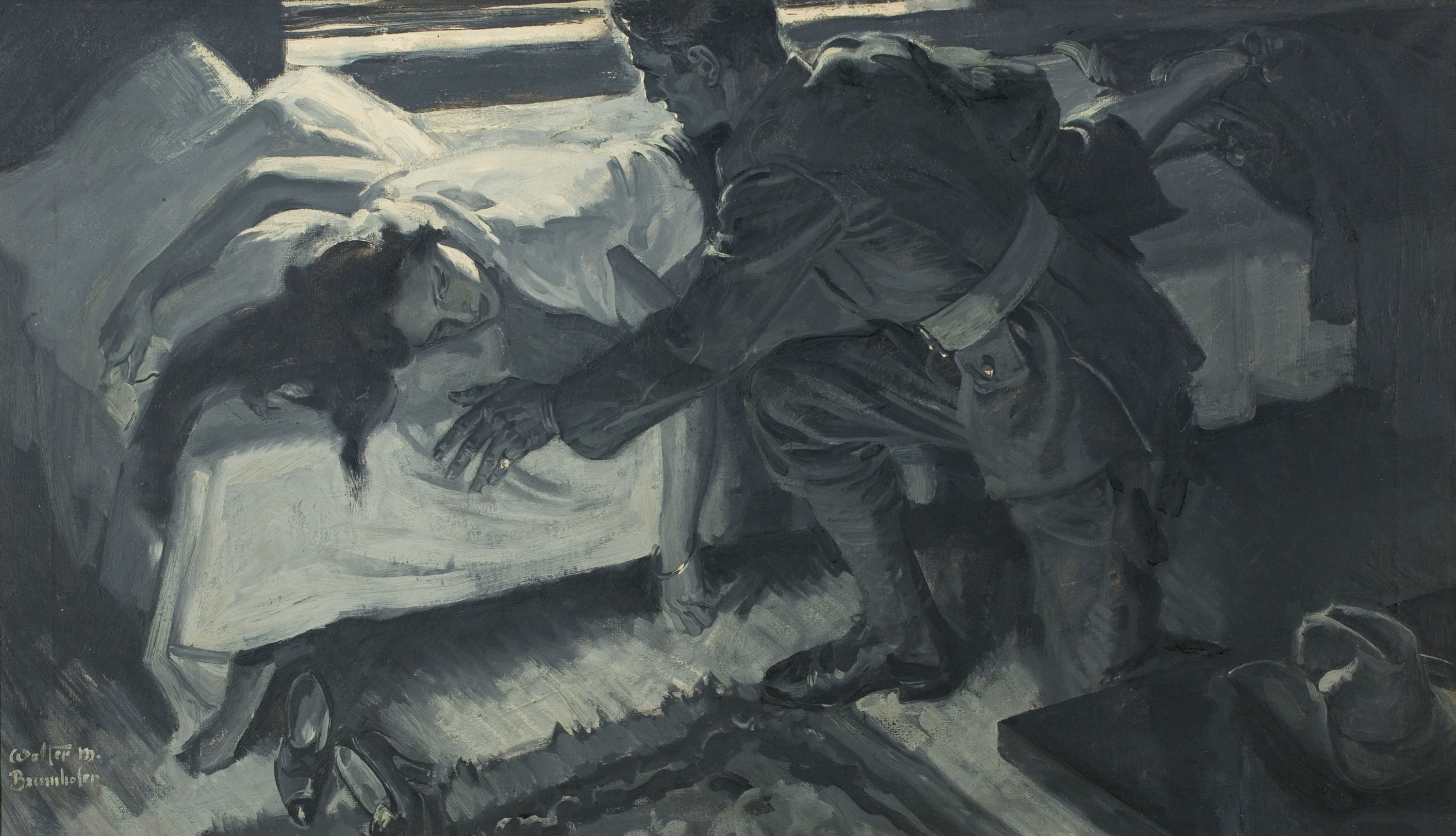
American Legion Monthly Illustration (1921) oil on canvas, 24.25 inch. x 38.75 inch.
