= List of The Shadow stories =

The following is a list of stories featuring The Shadow, a fictional vigilante.

== Pulp magazine novels ==
All of these pulp magazine novels featuring The Shadow were published under the name Maxwell Grant. Unless noted, all were written by Walter B. Gibson and originally appeared in The Shadow Magazine and its variants, published by Street & Smith. Novels that have been reprinted are noted accordingly: see "Reprint history" below for more information.

=== 1–100 ===
- 001. "The Living Shadow", published April 1, 1931: Bantam #1, Pyramid #1, Sanctum Books #47
- 002. "Eyes of the Shadow", published July 1, 1931: Bantam #2, Sanctum Books #48
- 003. "The Shadow Laughs", published October 1, 1931: Bantam #3, Sanctum Books #49
- 004. "The Red Menace", published November 1, 1931: Pyramid #7, Sanctum Books #91
- 005. "Gangdom's Doom", published December 1, 1931: Bantam #7, Sanctum Books #101
- 006. "The Death Tower", published January 1, 1932: Bantam #4, Sanctum Books #125
- 007. "The Silent Seven", published February 1, 1932: Pyramid #10, Sanctum Books #125
- 008. "The Black Master", published March 1, 1932: Pyramid #2, Sanctum Books Shadow Annual #2
- 009. "Mobsmen on the Spot", published April 1, 1932: Pyramid #3, Sanctum Books #129
- 010. "Hands in the Dark", published May 1, 1932: Pyramid #4, Sanctum Books #130
- 011. "Double Z", published June 1, 1932: Pyramid #5, Sanctum Books #141
- 012. "The Crime Cult", published July 1, 1932: Pyramid #6, Sanctum Books #145
- 013. "The Blackmail Ring", published August 1, 1932: Sanctum Books #34
- 014. "Hidden Death", published September 1, 1932: Bantam #6, Sanctum Books #121
- 015. "Green Eyes", published October 1, 1932: Pyramid #13, Sanctum Books #137
- 016. "The Ghost Makers", published October 15, 1932: Bantam #5, Sanctum Books #124
- 017. "The Five Chameleons", published November 1, 1932: Sanctum Books #57
- 018. "Dead Men Live", published November 15, 1932: Sanctum Books #38
- 019. "The Romanoff Jewels", published December 1, 1932: Pyramid #9, Sanctum Books #103
- 020. "Kings of Crime", published December 15, 1932: Pyramid #11, Sanctum Books #139
- 021. "Shadowed Millions", published January 1, 1933: Pyramid #12: Sanctum Books #128
- 022. "The Creeping Death", published January 15, 1933: Pyramid #14, Sanctum Books #134
- 023. "The Shadow's Shadow", published February 1, 1933: Pyramid #16, Sanctum Books Shadow Annual #2
- 024. "Six Men of Evil", published February 15, 1933: Nostalgia Ventures #13
- 025. "Fingers of Death", published March 1, 1933: Pyramid #17, Sanctum Books #132
- 026. "Murder Trail", published March 15, 1933: Pyramid #18, Sanctum Books #129
- 027. "The Silent Death", published April 1, 1933: Pyramid #22, Sanctum Books #127
- 028. "The Shadow's Justice", published April 15, 1933: Nostalgia Ventures #6
- 029. "The Golden Grotto", published May 1, 1933: Sanctum Books #101
- 030. "The Death Giver", published May 15, 1933: Pyramid #23, Sanctum Books Shadow Annual #2
- 031. "The Red Blot", published June 1, 1933: Nostalgia Ventures #3
- 032. "The Ghost of the Manor", published June 15, 1933: Sanctum Books #66
- 033. "The Living Joss", published July 1, 1933: Sanctum Books #51
- 034. "The Silver Scourge", published July 15, 1933: Sanctum Books #32
- 035. "The Black Hush", published August 1, 1933: Sanctum Books #47
- 036. "Isle of Doubt", published August 15, 1933: Sanctum Books #148
- 037. "The Grove of Doom", published September 1, 1933: Grosset and Dunlop, Tempo Books (both edited text), Nostalgia Ventures #14
- 038. "Master of Death", published September 15, 1933: Sanctum Books #28
- 039. "The Road of Crime", published October 1, 1933: Nostalgia Ventures #11
- 040. "The Death Triangle", published October 15, 1933: Sanctum Books #100
- 041. "The Killer", published November 1, 1933: Sanctum Books #107
- 042. "Mox", published November 15, 1933: Pyramid #8, Sanctum Books #116
- 043. "The Crime Clinic", published December 1, 1933: Sanctum Books #40
- 044. "Treasures of Death", published December 15, 1933: Sanctum Books #89
- 045. "The Embassy Murders", published January 1, 1934: Sanctum Books #56
- 046. "The Wealth Seeker", published January 15, 1934: Pyramid #21, Sanctum Books #136
- 047. "The Black Falcon", published February 1, 1934: Nostalgia Ventures #5
- 048. "Gray Fist", published February 15, 1934: Pyramid #15, Sanctum Books #137
- 049. "Circle of Death", published March 1, 1934: Sanctum Books #78
- 050. "The Green Box", published March 15, 1934: Sanctum Books #59
- 051. "The Cobra", published April 1, 1934: Nostalgia Ventures #7
- 052. "Crime Circus", published April 15, 1934: Sanctum Books #79
- 053. "Tower of Death", published May 1, 1934: Nostalgia Ventures #22
- 054. "Death Clew", published May 15, 1934: Sanctum Books #67
- 055. "The Key", published June 1, 1934: Sanctum Books #43
- 056. "The Crime Crypt", published June 15, 1934: Sanctum Books Shadow Annual #1
- 057. "Charg, Monster", published July 1, 1934: Pyramid #20, Sanctum Books #127
- 058. "Chain of Death", published July 15, 1934: Sanctum Books #41
- 059. "The Crime Master", published August 1, 1934: Sanctum Books #52
- 060. "Gypsy Vengeance", published August 15, 1934: Sanctum Books #65
- 061. "Spoils of The Shadow", published September 1, 1934: Sanctum Books #71
- 062. "The Garaucan Swindle", published September 15, 1934: Sanctum Books #69
- 063. "Murder Marsh", published October 1, 1934: Sanctum Books #130
- 064. "The Death Sleep", published October 15, 1934: Sanctum Books #69
- 065. "The Chinese Disks", published November 1, 1934: Nostalgia Ventures #2
- 066. "Doom on the Hill", published November 15, 1934: Sanctum Books #105
- 067. "The Unseen Killer", published December 1, 1934: Nostalgia Ventures #18
- 068. "Cyro", published December 15, 1934: Sanctum Books #62
- 069. "The Four Signets", published January 1, 1935: Sanctum Books #122
- 070. "The Blue Sphinx", published January 15, 1935: Nostalgia Ventures #20
- 071. "The Plot Master", published February 1, 1935: Nostalgia Ventures #21
- 072. "The Dark Death", published February 15, 1935: Sanctum Books #31
- 073. "Crooks Go Straight", published March 1, 1935: Nostalgia Ventures #11
- 074. "Bells of Doom", published March 15, 1935: Sanctum Books #42
- 075. "Lingo", published April 1, 1935: Nostalgia Ventures #9
- 076. "The Triple Trail", published April 15, 1935: Sanctum Books #61
- 077. "The Golden Quest", published May 1, 1935: Sanctum Books #54
- 078. "The Third Skull", published May 15, 1935: Sanctum Books #37
- 079. "Murder Every Hour", published June 1, 1935: Sanctum Books #81
- 080. "The Condor", published June 15, 1935: Sanctum Books #35
- 081. "The Fate Joss", published July 1, 1935: Nostalgia Ventures #17
- 082. "Atoms of Death", published July 15, 1935: Sanctum Books #44
- 083. "The Man From Scotland Yard", published August 1, 1935: Sanctum Books #70
- 084. "The Creeper", published August 15, 1935: Sanctum Books #88
- 085. "Mardi Gras Mystery", published September 1, 1935: Sanctum Books #99
- 086. "The London Crimes", published September 15, 1935: Nostalgia Ventures #8
- 087. "The Ribbon Clues", published October 1, 1935: Sanctum Books #64
- 088. "The House That Vanished", published October 15, 1935: Sanctum Books #46
- 089. "The Chinese Tapestry", published November 1, 1935: Sanctum Books #95
- 090. "The Python", published November 15, 1935: Sanctum Books #27
- 091. "Zemba", published December 1, 1935: Pyramid #19, Sanctum Books #70
- 092. "The Case of Congressman Coyd", December 15, 1935: Sanctum Books #43
- 093. "The Ghost Murders", published January 1, 1936: Sanctum Books #135
- 094. "Castle of Doom", published January 15, 1936: Nostalgia Ventures #8
- 095. "Death Rides the Skyway", published February 1, 1936: Sanctum Books #64
- 096. "The North Woods Mystery", published February 15, 1936: Sanctum Books #96
- 097. "The Voodoo Master", published March 1, 1936: Nostalgia Ventures #3
- 098. "The Third Shadow", published March 15, 1936: Nostalgia Ventures #7
- 099. "The Salamanders", published April 1, 1936: Nostalgia Ventures #5
- 100. "The Man From Shanghai", published April 15, 1936: Sanctum Books #50

=== 101–200 ===
- 101. "The Gray Ghost", published May 1, 1936: Sanctum Books #25
- 102. "City of Doom", published May 15, 1936: Nostalgia Ventures #10
- 103. "The Crime Oracle", published June 1, 1936: Dover Facsimile, Sanctum Books #146
- 104. "Murder Town", published June 15, 1936: Sanctum Books #148
- 105. "The Yellow Door", published July 1, 1936: Sanctum Books #89
- 106. "The Broken Napoleons", published July 15, 1936: Nostalgia Ventures #6
- 107. "The Sledge-hammer Crimes", published August 1, 1936: Sanctum Books #78
- 108. "Terror Island", published August 15, 1936: Sanctum Books #45
- 109. "The Golden Masks", published September 1, 1936: Nostalgia Ventures #18
- 110. "Jibaro Death", published September 15, 1936: Nostalgia Ventures #20
- 111. "City of Crime", published October 1, 1936: Nostalgia Ventures #16
- 112. "Death By Proxy", published October 15, 1936: Sanctum Books #114
- 113. "Partners of Peril" by Theodore Tinsley, published November 1, 1936: Nostalgia Ventures #9
- 114. "The Strange Disappearance of Joe Cardona", published November 15, 1936: Sanctum Books #33
- 115. "Seven Drops of Blood", published December 1, 1936: Sanctum Books #73
- 116. "Intimidation, Inc.", published December 15, 1936: Sanctum Books #72
- 117. "Vengeance Is Mine", published January 1, 1937: Sanctum Books #26
- 118. "Fox Hound" by Theodore Tinsley, published January 15, 1937: Sanctum Books #66
- 119. "Loot of Death", published February 1, 1937: Sanctum Books #114
- 120. "Quetzal", published February 15, 1937: Nostalgia Ventures #24
- 121. "Death Token", published March 1, 1937: Sanctum Books #112
- 122. "Murder House", published March 15, 1937: Sanctum Books #92
- 123. "Washington Crime", published April 1, 1937: Nostalgia Ventures #24
- 124. "The Masked Headsman", published April 15, 1937: Sanctum Books #54
- 125. "The Cup of Confucius" by Theodore Tinsley, published May 1, 1937: Sanctum Books #120
- 126. "Treasure Trail", published May 15, 1937: Sanctum Books #86
- 127. "Brothers of Doom", published June 1, 1937: Sanctum Books #93
- 128. "The Shadow's Rival", published June 15, 1937: Sanctum Books #29
- 129. "Crime, Insured", published July 1, 1937: Nostalgia Ventures #1
- 130. "House of Silence", published July 15, 1937: Sanctum Books #71
- 131. "The Shadow Unmasks", published August 1, 1937: Nostalgia Ventures #15
- 132. "The Yellow Band", published August 15, 1937: Nostalgia Ventures #15
- 133. "Buried Evidence", published September 1, 1937: Sanctum Books #44
- 134. "The Radium Murders", published September 15, 1937: Sanctum Books #111
- 135. "The Pooltex Tangle" by Theodore Tinsley, published October 1, 1937: Sanctum Books #87
- 136. "The Keeper's Gold", published October 15, 1937: Sanctum Books #115
- 137. "Death Turrets", published November 1, 1937: Sanctum Books #87
- 138. "Teeth of the Dragon", published November 15, 1937: Dover Facsimile, Sanctum Books #118
- 139. "The Sealed Box", published December 1, 1937: Sanctum Books #30
- 140. "Racket Town", published December 15, 1937: Sanctum Books #30
- 141. "The Crystal Buddha", published January 1, 1938: Sanctum Books #74
- 142. "Hills of Death", published January 15, 1938: Sanctum Books #56
- 143. "The Fifth Napoleon" by Theodore Tinsley, published February 1, 1938: Sanctum Books #52
- 144. "The Murder Master", published February 15, 1938: Nostalgia Ventures #4
- 145. "The Golden Pagoda", published March 1, 1938: Nostalgia Ventures #17
- 146. "Face of Doom", published March 15, 1938: Sanctum Books #39
- 147. "The Crimson Phoenix" by Theodore Tinsley, published April 1, 1938: Sanctum Books #86
- 148. "Serpents of Siva", published April 15, 1938:Nostalgia Ventures #12
- 149. "Cards of Death", published May 1, 1938: Sanctum Books#40
- 150. "The Hand", published May 15, 1938: Sanctum Books #33
- 151. "Voodoo Trail", published June 1, 1938: Nostalgia Ventures #19
- 152. "The Rackets King", published June 15, 1938: Sanctum Books #28
- 153. "Murder For Sale", published July 1, 1938: Sanctum Books #34
- 154. "The Golden Vulture" cowritten by Lester Dent, published July 15, 1938: Nostalgia Ventures #1
- 155. "Death Jewels", published August 1, 1938: Nostalgia Ventures #21
- 156. "The Green Hoods", published August 15, 1938: Sanctum Books #55
- 157. "The Golden Dog Murders" by Theodore Tinsley, published September 1, 1938: Sanctum Books #50
- 158. "Crime Over Boston", published September 15, 1938: Sanctum Books #83
- 159. "The Dead Who Lived", published October 1, 1938: Sanctum Books #144
- 160. "Vanished Treasure", published October 15, 1938: Sanctum Books #131
- 161. "The Voice", published November 1, 1938: Sanctum Books #123
- 162. "Chicago Crime", published November 15, 1938: Sanctum Books #35
- 163. "Shadow Over Alcatraz", published December 1, 1938: Nostalgia Ventures #16
- 164. "Double Death" by Theodore Tinsley, published December 15, 1938: Sanctum Books #104
- 165. "Silver Skull", published January 1, 1939: Sanctum Books #55
- 166. "Crime Rides the Sea", published January 15, 1939: Sanctum Books #36
- 167. "Realm of Doom", published February 1, 1939: Sanctum Books #37
- 168. "The Lone Tiger", published February 15, 1939: Sanctum Books #90
- 169. "River of Death" by Theodore Tinsley, published March 1, 1939: Sanctum Books #36
- 170. "The Vindicator", published March 15, 1939: Sanctum Books #74
- 171. "Death Ship", published April 1, 1939: Sanctum Books #76
- 172. "Battle of Greed", published April 15, 1939: Sanctum Books #26
- 173. "Death's Harlequin" by Theodore Tinsley, published May 1, 1939: Nostalgia Ventures #19
- 174. "The Three Brothers", published May 15, 1939: Sanctum Books #93
- 175. "Smugglers of Death", published June 1, 1939: Nostalgia Ventures #23
- 176. "City of Shadows", published June 15, 1939: Sanctum Books #84
- 177. "Noose of Death" by Theodore Tinsley, published July 1, 1939: Sanctum Books #79
- 178. "Death From Nowhere", published July 15, 1939: Sanctum Books #73
- 179. "Isle of Gold", published August 1, 1939: Sanctum Books #131
- 180. "Wizard of Crime", published August 15, 1939: Sanctum Books #46
- 181. "The Crime Ray", published September 1, 1939: Sanctum Books #39
- 182. "The Golden Master", published September 15, 1939: Mysterious Press, Sanctum Books #75
- 183. "Castle of Crime", published October 1, 1939: Sanctum Books #58
- 184. "The Masked Lady", published October 15, 1939: Nostalgia Ventures #14
- 185. "Ships of Doom", published November 1, 1939: Sanctum Books #135
- 186. "City of Ghosts", published November 15, 1939: Sanctum Books #45
- 187. "Shiwan Khan Returns", published December 1, 1939: Mysterious Press, Sanctum Books #80
- 188. "House of Shadows", published December 15, 1939: Sanctum Books #31
- 189. "Death's Premium", published January 1, 1940: Sanctum Books #41
- 190. "The Hooded Circle", published January 15, 1940: Nostalgia Ventures #22
- 191. "The Getaway Ring", published February 1, 1940: Sanctum Books #59
- 192. "Voice of Death", published February 15, 1940: Sanctum Books #49
- 193. "The Invincible Shiwan Khan", published March 1, 1940: Sanctum Books #80
- 194. "The Veiled Prophet", published March 15, 1940: Sanctum Books #65
- 195. "The Spy Ring", published April 1, 1940: Sanctum Books #82
- 196. "Prince of Evil" by Theodore Tinsley, published April 15, 1940: Sanctum Books #60
- 197. "Death in the Stars", published May 1, 1940: Sanctum Books #84
- 198. "Masters of Death", published May 15, 1940: Sanctum Books #85
- 199. "Scent of Death", published June 1, 1940: Sanctum Books #126
- 200. "Q", published June 15, 1940: Sanctum Books #94

=== 201–300 ===
- 201. "Murder Genius" by Theodore Tinsley, originally published July 1, 1940: Sanctum Books #61
- 202. "Gems of Doom", originally published July 15, 1940: Sanctum Books #98
- 203. "Crime at Seven Oaks", originally published August 1, 1940: Sanctum Books #97
- 204. "The Fifth Face", originally published August 15, 1940: Nostalgia Ventures #10
- 205. "Crime County", originally published September 1, 1940: Sanctum Books #116
- 206. "The Man Who Died Twice" by Theodore Tinsley, originally published September 15, 1940: Sanctum Books #62
- 207. "The Wasp", originally published October 1, 1940: Sanctum Books #57
- 208. "City of Fear" by Theodore Tinsley, originally published October 15, 1940: Sanctum Books #99
- 209. "Crime Over Miami", originally published November 1, 1940: Sanctum Books #83
- 210. "The Devil's Paymaster" by Theodore Tinsley, originally published November 15, 1940: Sanctum Books #63
- 211. "Xitli, God of Fire", originally published December 1, 1940: Sanctum Books #67
- 212. "The Shadow, The Hawk and the Skull", originally published December 15, 1940: Sanctum Books #27
- 213. "Forgotten Gold", originally published January 1, 1941: Sanctum Books #115
- 214. "The Green Terror" by Theodore Tinsley, originally published January 15, 1941: Sanctum Books Shadow Annual #1
- 215. "The Wasp Returns", originally published February 1, 1941: Sanctum Books #63
- 216. "The Chinese Primrose", originally published February 15, 1941: Sanctum Books #126
- 217. "Mansion of Crime", originally published March 1, 1941: Sanctum Books #150
- 218. "The White Column" by Theodore Tinsley, originally published March 15, 1941: Sanctum Books #82
- 219. "The Time Master", originally published April 1, 1941: Sanctum Books #81
- 220. "The House on the Ledge", originally published April 15, 1941: Sanctum Books #110
- 221. "The League of Death", originally published May 1, 1941: Sanctum Books #110
- 222. "Master of Flame" by Theodore Tinsley, originally published May 15, 1941: Sanctum Books #117
- 223. "Crime Under Cover", originally published June 1, 1941: Sanctum Books #103
- 224. "The Thunder King", originally published June 15, 1941: Sanctum Books #68
- 225. "The Star of Delhi", originally published July 1, 1941: Sanctum Books #68
- 226. "The Blur", originally published July 15, 1941: Sanctum Books #109
- 227. "The Crimson Death" by Theodore Tinsley, originally published August 1, 1941: Sanctum Books #100
- 228. "The Shadow Meets The Mask", originally published August 15, 1941: Sanctum Books #143
- 229. "Gems of Jeopardy" by Theodore Tinsley, originally published September 1, 1941: Sanctum Books #150
- 230. "The Devil Master", originally published September 15, 1941: Sanctum Books #29
- 231. "Garden of Death", originally published October 1, 1941: Sanctum Books #53
- 232. "Dictator of Crime", originally published October 15, 1941: Sanctum Books #38
- 233. "The Blackmail King", originally published November 1, 1941: Nostalgia Ventures #23
- 234. "Temple of Crime", originally published November 15, 1941: Sanctum Books #77
- 235. "Murder Mansion", originally published December 1, 1941: Sanctum Books #138
- 236. "Crime's Stronghold", originally published December 15, 1941: Sanctum Books #119
- 237. "Alibi Trail", originally published January 1, 1942: Sanctum Books #151
- 238. "The Book of Death", originally published January 15, 1942: Sanctum Books #32
- 239. "Death Diamonds", originally published February 1, 1942: Sanctum Books #119
- 240. "Blue Face" by Theodore Tinsley, originally published February 15, 1942: Sanctum Books #109
- 241. "Vengeance Bay", originally published March 1, 1942: Sanctum Books #108
- 242. "Formula for Crime", originally published March 15, 1942: Sanctum Books #94
- 243. "Room of Doom", originally published April 1, 1942: Sanctum Books #106
- 244. "The Jade Dragon", originally published April 15, 1942: Doubleday Crime Club; Sanctum Books #95
- 245. "The Northdale Mystery", originally published May 1, 1942: Sanctum Books #97
- 246. "Death's Bright Finger" by Theodore Tinsley, originally published May 15, 1942: Sanctum Books #75
- 247. "Twins of Crime", originally published June 1, 1942: Sanctum Books #150
- 248. "The Devil's Feud", originally published June 15, 1942: Sanctum Books #150
- 249. "Five Ivory Boxes", originally published July 1, 1942: Sanctum Books #142
- 250. "Death About Town", originally published July 15, 1942: Sanctum Books #96
- 251. "Legacy of Death", originally published August 1, 1942: Sanctum Books #113
- 252. "Judge Lawless", originally published August 15, 1942: Sanctum Books #51
- 253. "The Vampire Murders", originally published September 1, 1942: Sanctum Books #53
- 254. "Syndicate of Sin" by Theodore Tinsley, originally published September 15, 1942: Sanctum Books #133
- 255. "The Devil's Partner" by Theodore Tinsley, originally published October 1, 1942: Sanctum Books #113
- 256. "Clue for Clue", originally published October 15, 1942: Sanctum Books #105
- 257. "Trail of Vengeance", originally published November 1, 1942: Sanctum Books #147
- 258. "The Murdering Ghost", originally published November 15, 1942: Sanctum Books #42
- 259. "The Hydra", originally published December 1, 1942: Nostalgia Ventures #4
- 260. "The Money Master", originally published December 15, 1942: Sanctum Books #48
- 261. "The Museum Murders", originally published January 1, 1943: Sanctum Books #107
- 262. "Death's Masquerade", originally published January 15, 1943: Sanctum Books #88
- 263. "The Devil Monsters", originally published February 1, 1943: Nostalgia Ventures #13
- 264. "Wizard of Crime", originally published February 15, 1943: Sanctum Books #72
- 265. "The Black Dragon", originally published March 1, 1943: Sanctum Books #76
- 266. "Young Men of Death" by Theodore Tinsley, originally published April 1, 1943: Sanctum Books #138
- 267. "The Robot Master", originally published May 1, 1943: Sanctum Books #104
- 268. "Murder Lake", originally published June 1, 1943: Sanctum Books #140
- 269. "The Golden Doom" by Theodore Tinsley, originally published July 1, 1943: Sanctum Books #151
- 270. "Messenger of Death", originally published August 1, 1943: Sanctum Books #60
- 271. "House of Ghosts", originally published September 1, 1943: Doubleday Crime Club, Sanctum Books #124
- 272. "King of the Black Market", originally published October 1, 1943: Sanctum Books #102
- 273. "The Muggers", originally published November 1, 1943: Sanctum Books #90
- 274. "Murder by Moonlight", originally published December 1, 1943: Grosset and Dunlop (edited text), Sanctum Books #146
- 275. "The Crystal Skull", originally published January 1, 1944: Sanctum Books #111
- 276. "Syndicate of Death", originally published February 1, 1944: Sanctum Books #140
- 277. "The Toll of Death", originally published March 1, 1944: Sanctum Books #143
- 278. "Crime Caravan", originally published April 1, 1944: Sanctum Books #102
- 279. "Freak Show Murders", originally published May 1, 1944: Doubleday Crime Club, Sanctum Books #149
- 280. "Voodoo Death", originally published June 1, 1944: Grosset and Dunlop (edited text), Sanctum Books #85
- 281. "Town of Hate", originally published July 1, 1944: Sanctum Books #117
- 282. "Death in the Crystal", originally published August 1, 1944: Sanctum Books #92
- 283. "The Chest of Chu Chan", originally published September 1, 1944: Sanctum Books #106
- 284. "The Shadow Meets The Mask", originally published October 1, 1944: Sanctum Books #121
- 285. "Fountain of Death", originally published November 1, 1944: Sanctum Books #148
- 286. "No Time for Murder", originally published December 1, 1944: Sanctum Books #120
- 287. "Guardian of Death", originally published January 1, 1945: Sanctum Books #136
- 288. "Merry Mrs. Macbeth", originally published February 1, 1945: Sanctum Books #133
- 289. "Five Keys To Crime", originally published March 1, 1945: Sanctum Books #122
- 290. "Death Has Grey Eyes", originally published April 1, 1945: Sanctum Books #108
- 291. "Tear-Drops of Buddha", originally published May 1, 1945: Sanctum Books #98
- 292. "Three Stamps of Death", originally published June 1, 1945: Sanctum Books #112
- 293. "The Mask of Mephisto", originally published July 1, 1945: Doubleday Crime Club, Sanctum Books #140
- 294. "Murder By Magic", originally published August 1, 1945: Doubleday Crime Club, Sanctum Books #149
- 295. "The Taiwan Joss", originally published September 1, 1945: Sanctum Books #145
- 296. "A Quarter of Eight", originally published October 1, 1945: Doubleday Crime Club; Sanctum Books #142
- 297. "The White Skulls", originally published November 1, 1945: Sanctum Books #25
- 298. "The Stars Promise Death", originally published December 1, 1945: Sanctum Bools #139
- 299. "The Banshee Murders", originally published January 1, 1946: Sanctum Books #134
- 300. "Crime Out Of Mind", originally published February 1, 1946: Sanctum Books #149

=== 301–325 ===
- 301. "Mother Goose Murders", published March 1, 1946: Doubleday Crime Club, Sanctum Books #147
- 302. "Crime Over Casco", published April 1, 1946: Doubleday Crime Club, Sanctum Books #144
- 303. "The Curse of Thoth", published May 1, 1946: Sanctum Books #77
- 304. "Alibi Trail", published June 1, 1946: Sanctum Books #123
- 305. "Malmordo", published July 1, 1946: Nostalgia Ventures #2
- 306. "The Blackest Mail" by Bruce Elliott, published August 1, 1946: Sanctum Books #132
- 307. "Happy Death Day" by Bruce Elliott, published September 1, 1946: NEVER REPRINTED
- 308. "The Seven Deadly Arts" by Bruce Elliott, published October 1, 1946: Sanctum Books #100
- 309. "No Safety In Numbers" by Bruce Elliott, published November 1, 1946: Sanctum Books #128
- 310. "Death on Ice" by Bruce Elliott, published December 1, 1946: Sanctum Books #141
- 311. "Death Stalks the U.N." by Bruce Elliott, published January 1, 1947:NEVER REPRINTED
- 312. "Murder in White" by Bruce Elliott, published March 1, 1947: Sanctum Books #136
- 313. "Room 1313" by Bruce Elliott, published May 1, 1947: Sanctum Books #60
- 314. "Model Murder" by Bruce Elliott, published July 1, 1947: Sanctum Books #86
- 315. "Svengali Kill" by Bruce Elliott, published September 1, 1947: Sanctum Books #149
- 316. "Jabberwocky Thrust" by Bruce Elliott, published November 1, 1947: Sanctum Books #50
- 317. "Ten Glass Eyes" by Bruce Elliott, published January 1, 1948: Sanctum Books #142
- 318. "The Television Murders" by Bruce Elliott, published March 1, 1948: Sanctum Books #151
- 319. "Murder on Main Street" by Bruce Elliott, published May 1, 1948:NEVER REPRINTED
- 320. "Reign of Terror" by Bruce Elliott, published July 1, 1948: Sanctum Books #75
- 321. "Jade Dragon", published September 1, 1948: Doubleday Crime Club, Sanctum Books #118
- 322. "Dead Man's Chest", published Fall 1948: Sanctum Books #58
- 323. "The Magigals Mystery", published Winter 1949: Nostalgia Ventures #12
- 324. "The Black Circle", published Spring 1949: Sanctum Books #91
- 325. "The Whispering Eyes", published Summer 1949: Sanctum Books #151

== Belmont Books paperback novels ==
These original novels featuring The Shadow were published as paperback books by Belmont Books and have been numbered 326 to 334. The first of then, Return of the Shadow, was the only one to be written by Walter B. Gibson. The rest were pastiches written by Dennis Lynds (a.k.a. Michael Collins).

- 326. Return of The Shadow, published September 1, 1963 (a new novel written by Walter B. Gibson)
- 327. The Shadow Strikes by Dennis Lynds, published October 1, 1964
- 328. Shadow Beware by Dennis Lynds, published January 1, 1965
- 329. Cry Shadow! by Dennis Lynds, published April 1, 1965
- 330. The Shadow's Revenge by Dennis Lynds, published October 1, 1965
- 331. Mark of The Shadow by Dennis Lynds, published May 1, 1966
- 332. Shadow-Go Mad! by Dennis Lynds, published September 1, 1966
- 333. The Night of The Shadow by Dennis Lynds, published November 1, 1966
- 334. The Shadow-Destination: Moon by Dennis Lynds, published March 1, 1967

== Anthologies ==
Finally, these two short stories featuring The Shadow were published as anthology items. They have been numbered 335 and 336 and were written by Walter B. Gibson.

- 335. "The Riddle of the Rangoon Ruby", published June 1, 1979 in The Shadow Scrapbook fan publication
- 336. "Blackmail Bay", published February 1, 1980 in The Duende History of The Shadow Magazine fan publication

See also: http://www.shadowsanctum.net/index.html

== Reprint history ==
The first three Shadow novels were issued in small hardcover versions in 1935 by the Ideal Library.

There were three Shadow annuals: in 1942, 1943 and 1947. Each annual would reprint three earlier published novels. (The three novels in each annual were edited to shorter lengths to fit the prescribed size of the publications.)

The next reprints of the original pulp stories did not appear until after the original stories ended in 1949: The Weird Adventures of The Shadow was published in 1966 by Grosset and Dunlop. This anthology, however, considerably edited the three stories that it contained.

Grosset also published one story, "The Grove of Doom" (pulp #37), as a Tempo paperback (5320), crediting Walter Gibson as author rather than using the Maxwell Grant pseudonym.

From 1969 to 1970, Bantam Books published seven reprints of early Shadow stories (reprinting #'s 1, 2, 3, 5, 6, 14 and 16 from the original pulp series). The stories contained minor edits.

In 1974, Pyramid Books began reprinting early Shadow stories. The series, which consisted of 23 volumes, lasted through 1978. The reprints did not follow the original order of the pulp series. (The pulps reprinted were # 1, 4, 7, 8, 9, 10, 11, 12, 15, 19, 20, 21, 22, 23, 25, 26, 27, 30, 42, 46, 48, 57 and 91.)

In 1975, two Shadow stories were published in a facsimile magazine published by Dover (reprinting pulps #103 and #138).

Eight Shadow stories were reissued in hardcover anthologies by the Doubleday Crime Club in the 1970s (reprinting pulps # 244, 271, 279, 293, 294, 296, 301 and 302). These reprints give sole credit to Walter Gibson as the author, rather than using the Maxwell Grant pseudonym on the cover.

In 1984, Mysterious Press published The Shadow and the Golden Master, a hardcover anthology that reprinted the first two appearances of Shiwan Khan, "The Golden Master" (#182) and "Shiwan Khan Returns" (#187). Dover Books would later reprint the same content in paperback.

In 2006, Sanctum Books, in association with Nostalgia Ventures, began reprinting the original pulps in near-replica, unedited editions. Each issue contains the original interior illustrations from the pulps as well as the original covers on the front and back. In late 2008, Nostalgia Ventures chose to end their association. The first 24 books were published under the Nostalgia Ventures brand, then Sanctum Books continued on their own beginning with book #25. (Sanctum Books also released a variant edition of book #9 using an alternate cover.) As of January 2020, 151 volumes and two annuals have been published. Each volume reprints two novels except for volumes #50, 60, 75, 86, 100, 136, 140, 142, 148, and annual 2, which reprint three novels in each book. The final three volumes (#149, 150, and 151) contain four novels in each book.

An early termination of license at the last minute caused Sanctum Books to be unable to publish three Shadow novels by Bruce Elliott, leaving #307 ("Happy Death Day"), #311 ("Death Stalks the U. N.") and #319 ("Murder on Main Street") as the only three The Shadow pulp novels not to have ever been reprinted. Elliott's run of 15 novels in The Shadow magazine between 1946 and 1948 (issues #306 to 320) are held in low regard by Shadow fans because of his atypical handling of the character, which is best exemplified by those three particular stories not having the Shadow appear in his costumed identity.
