= The Shadow Strikes =

- Directed by: Lynn Shores
- Screenplay by: Al Martin
- Story by: Al Martin (Note: Adaptation); Rex Taylor
- Based on: "The Ghost of the Manor" by Walter B. Gibson
- Produced by: Arthur Alexander; Max Alexander
- Starring: Rod La Rocque
- Cinematography: Marcel Le Picard
- Edited by: Charles Henkel Jr.
- Distributed by: Grand National Pictures
- Release date: October 29, 1937
- Running time: 61 minutes
- Country: United States
- Language: English

The Shadow Strikes is a 1937 black and white American film based on the story "The Ghost of the Manor" written by Walter B. Gibson under the pen name Maxwell Grant. The Shadow was featured on a popular radio show and also as a pulp magazine crime fighter.

The film was directed by Lynn Shores and stars Rod La Rocque as Lamont Cranston, The Shadow. (The cast list at the beginning and a newspaper article toward the end of the film spell his surname Granston). This film is the first that features the character known as The Shadow, both this film and its sequel, International Crime, were produced by Colony Pictures and released by Grand National Pictures. The film was released on October 29, 1937.

== Plot ==
Lamont Granston assumes his secret identity as "The Shadow", to break up an attempted robbery at an attorney's office. When the police search the scene, Granston must assume the identity of the attorney, Chester Randall. Before he can leave, a phone call summons the attorney to the home of Caleb Delthiern, a wealthy client who wants a new will drawn up. As Granston meets with him, Delthiern is suddenly shot but not before he is able to state that his niece Marcia Delthiern "is to be completely disinherited if she marries Warran" (Berringer). The oldest nephew, Winstead Comstock is arrested as he is under suspicion since he stands to inherit half of Delthiern's entire estate, the remainder to be divided equally among the remaining heirs: Marcia, and two other nephews, Jasper Delthiern and Humphrey Comstock. Winstead is later cleared of suspicion as he was at the theater and a café at the time of the shooting.

Marcia discovers a pistol on Jasper's night stand, she and Humphrey phone "Randall" (Granston) at his private number and he agrees to come right over. After talking to Detective Kelly on the phone, Granston discovers the pistol is a different caliber than the one used in the Delthiern's murder. Marcia has Randall put the gun in the library desk drawer.

Chester Randall's secretary, Miss Hughes, phones Captain Breen to let him know she read that Randall is in town when in fact he is away on vacation. Breen finds Granston at the Delthiern's and inists he's an imposter. Granston/Randall has Breen phone his secretary to verify that he is who he says he is. Granston has his assistant, Henry Hendricks, disconnect the phone cord just before Granston talks to the secretary, but talks into the receiver as if she was still on the line. Breen is convinced and leaves.

Jasper owes casino club owner, Barney Brossett, ten thousand dollars for gambling debts. Jasper confronts Winstead and insists on an eleven thousand loan to pay off his gambling debts while holding the gun he finds in the desk drawer. A shot is fired and Winstead is killed, Granston asks Captain Breen to run a paraffin test to see if the pistol has been fired in the last two hours. Granston hands Marcia her uncle's will and asks her to keep it in a safe place.

Warran suspects that Granston is not really Randall after the telephone company repair the connection, he visits Randall's secretary and learns that Randall is supposed to be away on vacation and lets Captain Breen know. Marcia goes to Granston's home and warns him. Granston pays a visit to Brossett as Hendricks sets up a listening device in Brossett's window and overhears Brossett on the phone talking about getting the will from the Delthiern house to get Jasper to pay him to get the will back. Brossett's men go to the house and attempt to get Marcia to hand over the will, but The Shadow appears and forces them to hand it back.

Delthiern's butler, Wellington finds Granston's address on a piece of paper in Marcia's purse and goes to Granston's place and tells him he intends to kill him. Brossett now suspects that Granston is the Shadow, follows him to his residence and confronts him, while Wellington is hidden behind a curtain. Brossett and Wellington attempt to shoot Granston but instead kill each other as Granston ducks out of the way. A dying Wellington admits that he tried to get his son, Warran Berringer, some of the Delthiern money.

== Cast ==
- Rod La Rocque as Lamont Granston/The Shadow
- Agnes Anderson as Marcia Delthiern (as Lynn Anders)
- James Blakeley as Jasper Delthiern
- Walter McGrail as Winstead Comstock
- Bruce Kellogg as Humphrey Comstock
- Cy Kendall as Barney Brossett
- Kenneth Harlan as Captain Breen
- Norman Ainsley as Henry Hendricks
- John St. Polis as Caleb Delthiern
- Wilson Benge as Wellington
- John Carnivale as Warran Berringer
- James C. Morton as Detective Kelly

== Reception ==
Film Threat wrote: "The Shadow Strikes fails to build any meaningful thrills or anxiety in its audience."
