= Gold master =

Gold master may refer to:

- Golden master, a final version of software ready for release to manufacturing (The term is taken from the audio record making industry, specifically the process of audio mastering)
- a master recording from which copies can be made
- The Golden Master, a 1939 pulp novel featuring The Shadow written by Walter Gibson under the house name Maxwell Grant
