= The Golden Master =

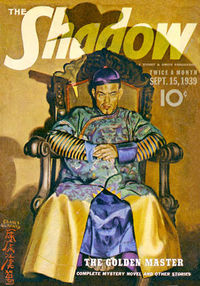
- Author: Walter Gibson
- Language: English
- Series: The Shadow
- Genre: Pulp Adventure
- Publisher: Street & Smith
- Publication date: September 1939
- Publication place: United States
- Media type: Pulp magazine
- Preceded by: The Crime Ray
- Followed by: Castle of Crime

The Golden Master (1939) is an American pulp novel featuring The Shadow, written by Walter Gibson under the house name Maxwell Grant. This was the 182nd Shadow story and it was published in The Shadow Magazine Vol. 31, No. 2 on 15 September 1939.

It has the first appearance of the hero's archenemy Shiwan Khan, and deals with a scheme by Khan to conquer the world by hypnotizing arms manufacturers.

== Plot summary ==
Shiwan Khan, heir to Genghis Khan, is in the United States to steal military technology in order to build his own army with the intent of conquering the world. He hypnotises Paul Brent of Globe Aircraft through the electronic lights of a nearby billboard. He orders him to create a larger production run of aircraft than originally intended, with the excess being sent on to Shiwan Khan. By similar methods, he also acquired engines and weapons.

The Shadow enters the story when Shiwan Khan attempts to dispose of Paul Brent. Working with Brent, The Shadow eventually tracks his opponent to his base of operations and apparently kills him when his escape plane crashes into the river.

== Publication history ==
The Golden Master was submitted 13 February 1939 and saw print in the pulp magazine The Shadow Magazine on 15 September of the same year.

The story was republished in the hard back book The Shadow and the Golden Master published in 1984 by Mysterious Press. This book also contained a second Shiwan Khan story, Shiwan Khan Returns. In addition to the standard edition, there was also a signed and numbered limited edition of 250 copies in a slipcover.

== Characters ==
- The Shadow
- Shiwan Khan: The Shadow's archenemy first appeared in this story and would return three more times in the pulps:
  - Shiwan Khan Returns (December 1939)
  - The Invincible Shiwan Khan (March 1940)
  - Masters of Death (May 1940)

Shiwan Khan is a direct descendant of Genghis Khan. As a youth, he travelled to Lhasa, Tibet and studied with the monks. However, while trying to later use his knowledge to help the people of Mongolia, he began to feel a lust for power and set out to rule the world as a new Khan.

He operates from the lost underground city of Xanadu, beneath the Sinkiang. He has access to the treasures of Kublai Khan and has been trained by the Tibetan monks to use telepathic powers - "the power of the distant mind." He can also appear invisible to most people by staying completely still and suspending his "action of thought."

- Paul Brent: Technical expert for Globe Aircraft. Recently back from South America, after arranging final order specs and hypnotized into providing equipment for Shiwan Khan's army, Brent is the viewpoint character for much of the story.
- Bob Ryndon: Stunt flier and adventurer; shot dead by Hoang Khu.
- Guy Chadbury: Has controlling interests in several munitions companies and is under Shiwan's control/influence.
- Lana Luan: Chinese/American woman. Mind-controlled by Shiwan Khan; real name Beatrice Chadbury.
  - Beatrice Chadbury: Niece of Guy Chadbury. Believes that she is really Lana Luan, due to Shiwan Khan's mind control.
  - Alice Haywood: A pseudonym for Beatrice Chadbury, although she believes she is really Lana Luan playing an American.
- Benjamin Twindell: A wealthy and eccentric New York jewel collector.
- Herbert Thorner: Twindell's representative.
- Dr. Roy Tam: An influential Chinese businessman who had often cooperated with The Shadow in the past.
- Loo Look: A Chinese merchant employed by Shiwan Khan.
- Mitchell Dorron: Manager of the Tropical Export Line and had worked for Shiwan Khan previously.
- Flash Gidley: Manhattan's cautious and strategic big shot.
- Herk Duvan: Gidley's lieutenant, prefers strong arm tactics to strategy.
- Brodie: Gunman killed by The Shadow.
- Hoang Khu: One of Shiwan Khan's Mongols; shot Bob Ryndon.
- Shan Juchi: One of Shiwan Khan's Mongols; killed by The Shadow.
- Dr. Rupert Sayre: Doctor and agent of the Shadow.
- Harper: Twindell's butler.

== Other media ==
The Golden Master was part of the basis for the 1994 film The Shadow which featured Shiwan Khan as the villain (played by John Lone).

== See also ==
- List of The Shadow stories
