= Michael Collins (American author) =

American mystery writer (1924–2005)

Michael Collins is the best-known pseudonym of Dennis Lynds (January 15, 1924 – August 19, 2005), an American author who primarily wrote mystery fiction.

Over four decades Lynds published some 80 novels and 200 short stories, in both mystery and literary themes. He was a recipient of the Edgar Award from the Mystery Writers of America (MWA), the Lifetime Achievement Award by the Private Eye Writers of America and the Marlowe Lifetime Achievement Award from MWA, Southern California Chapter.

== Early life ==
Lynds was born in St. Louis, Missouri, the only child of actors who were touring at the time. He grew up in New York City and fought in Europe during World War II, earning a Bronze Star and a Purple Heart. He studied chemistry (Bachelor's degree in 1949) and journalism (Master's degree in 1951). After working as a magazine editor in New York, he moved to California in 1965 to write full-time. Married to thriller author Gayle Lynds, he lived in California until his death.

== As Michael Collins ==
Written under the "Michael Collins" pen name, his Dan Fortune stories constitute one of the longest-running private detective series written, beginning in 1967 with Act of Fear, which earned a 1968 Edgar Award, for Best First Novel. As Collins, Lynds is largely credited with bringing the detective novel into the modern age:

"Many critics believe Dan Fortune to be the culmination of a maturing process that transformed the private eye from the naturalistic Spade (Dashiell Hammett) through the romantic Marlowe (Raymond Chandler) and the psychological Archer (Ross Macdonald) to the sociological Fortune (Michael Collins)"
- Private Eyes: 101 Knights (Robert Baker and Michael Nietzel)

"After naming Lynds the Best Suspense writer of the 1970s", Baker and Nietzel continue, the Crime Literature Association of West Germany praised him as follows:

"The break in private eye novels started with Michael Collins. At the end of the 1960s, he gave the form something new, a human touch needed for years. His novels are much more than entertainment. There is a philosophy behind the detective, and in each book we take a look at a special section of American society."

Baker and Nietzel point out a popular phenomenon that began with Collins's first book: "Act of Fear ... inspired the by-now monotonous chant by critics about each new hard-boiled author being 'the best since Hammett,' 'the new Chandler,' and 'the heir to Ross Macdonald.' Fortune enjoys a senior status among modern private eyes", predating Lawrence Block, Robert Parker, Elmore Leonard, Joseph Hansen, Joe Gores, Michael Lewin, and Bill Pronzini.

As Michael Collins, he also wrote two science fiction novels, Lukan War in 1969, and its sequel, The Planets of Death, in 1970. Both novels are about mercenaries in a future where they are despised and reviled by most people. When suddenly the society is attacked by a very dangerous enemy, they are called upon to fight and die to protect the same people who were treating them so badly not long before.

== As William Arden ==
Beginning in 1968 with The Mystery of the Moaning Cave and ending in 1989 with Hot Wheels, Lynds wrote fourteen novels under the pen name William Arden for the juvenile detective series The Three Investigators, which was originated by Robert Arthur, Jr. Under this same name, he also wrote five novels featuring private eye Kane Jackson, a former military policeman who has become an industrial security specialist after leaving the military. The first Jackson novel, A Dark Power, appeared in 1968. As Arden, Lynds also wrote the highly regarded espionage short story "Success of a Mission," which was a finalist for the 1968 Edgar Award for best short fiction.

== Other pseudonyms ==
Prolific, explaining that he had more ideas than he knew what to do with, in addition to his Collins name, he created additional series under the pseudonyms Mark Sadler, John Crowe, and Carl Dekker. For a few years, he published under three of these pseudonyms at the same time at three different publishing houses — Dodd Mead, Random House, and Bobbs-Merrill. For many years, The New York Times listed his books annually as among the nation's top mysteries. One year, two appeared on the same list, each written under a different pseudonym. He also penned 8 Belmont Books mass-market paperbacks of The Shadow from 1964 to 1967 under the Shadow's author by-line Maxwell Grant.

== Other works ==
As he was writing detective novels, he also published literary books and some 100 literary short stories. Five of the stories were honored in Best American Short Stories. He was twice short-listed for the Drue Heinz Literature Prize. His mystery and detective short stories have appeared in Best Crime & Mystery Stories of the Year many times. Twice he was the guest of honor at literary festivals in France honoring the American detective novel.

== New styles ==
In the late 1980s and into the 1990s, Lynds's work took another turn. He began lacing his detective novels with short stories, biographies, and symbolic vignettes, a literary technique that recent mystery writers have copied and expanded. Critic Richard C. Carpenter discussed it in Twentieth Century Crime and Mystery Writers:

"Powerful and memorable, [these new works] indicate that Collins has embarked on a new course after some 60 books. Truly he is a writer to be reckoned with."

== Selected bibliography ==
=== Science Fiction novels by Michael Collins ===
- Lukan War, 1969
- The Planets of Death, 1970

=== Dan Fortune novels by Michael Collins ===
- Act Of Fear, 1967
- The Brass Rainbow, 1969
- Night Of The Toads, 1970
- Walk A Black Wind, 1971
- Shadow Of A Tiger, 1972
- The Silent Scream, 1973
- Blue Death, 1975
- The Blood-Red Dream, 1976
- The Nightrunners, 1978
- The Slasher, 1980
- Freak, 1983
- Minnesota Strip, 1987
- Red Rosa, 1988
- Castrato, 1989
- Chasing Eights, 1990
- The Irishman's Horse, 1991
- Cassandra In Red, 1992
- Crime, Punishment, and Resurrection, 1992
- The Cadillac Cowboy, 1995

=== Kane Jackson novels by William Arden ===
- A Dark Power, 1968
- Deal in Violence, 1969
- The Goliath Scheme. 1970
- Die to a Distant Drum, 1972 (aka Murder Underground)
- Deadly Legacy, 1973

=== Detective short story collections by Michael Collins ===
- Crime, Punishment And Resurrection, 1992
- Fortune’s World, Crippen & Landru, 2000
- Spies and Thieves, Cops and Killers, 2002
- Slot-Machine Kelly: The Collected Private-Eye Cases of the "One-Armed Bandit,", Crippen & Landru, 2005

=== Paul Shaw novels by Mark Sadler ===
- The Falling Man, 1970
- Here To Die, 1971
- Mirror Image, 1972
- Circle of Fire, 1973
- Touch of Death, 1981
- Deadly Innocents, 1986

=== The Shadow novels as Maxwell Grant ===
- The Shadow Strikes (1965)
- Shadow Beware (1965)
- Cry Shadow! (1965)
- The Shadow's Revenge (1965)
- Mark of The Shadow (1966)
- Shadow-Go Mad! (1966)
- The Night of The Shadow (1966)
- The Shadow-Destination: Moon (1967)

=== Mainstream novels and short story collections by Dennis Lynds ===
- Combat Soldier, novel, 1962
- Uptown Downtown, novel, 1963
- Why Girls Ride Sidesaddle, short stories, 1980
- Talking To The World, novella and short stories, 1995
