= International Crime (1938 film) =

- Directed by: Charles Lamont
- Written by: Theodore A. Tinsley (story: "Foxhound"); Jack Natteford (screenplay); John W. Krafft (additional dialogue)
- Produced by: Arthur and Max Alexander (producers); Alfred Stern (associate producer)
- Starring: Rod La Rocque; Astrid Allwyn
- Cinematography: Marcel Le Picard
- Edited by: Charles Henkel Jr.
- Music by: Edward Kilenyi
- Production company: Grand National Pictures
- Release date: 22 April 1938
- Running time: 62 minutes
- Country: United States
- Language: English

International Crime is a 1938 American film featuring a loose version of The Shadow directed by Charles Lamont starring Rod La Rocque and Astrid Allwyn.

== Plot ==
Lamont Cranston is an amateur criminologist and detective, who hosts a daily radio program sponsored by the Daily Classic newspaper. He has developed a friendly but occasionally terse feud with Police Commissioner Weston. Cranston complains to his managing editor, Edward Heath, about his incompetent new assistant, Phoebe Lane. Heath advises him that because she is the publisher's niece, she cannot be fired. During his radio broadcast, Phoebe gives Cranston a note that the Metropolitan Theatre is to be robbed at eight o'clock. Afterwards, he learns she got the information from a man she met in a café. Cranston goes to the theatre; Weston and his men have already arrived, but there is no crime. Across town, international banker Gerald Morton is killed and his safe is robbed.

Cranston arrives there ahead of the police and gathers evidence. The irate Weston has him jailed as a material witness, but Phoebe gets him released with a writ of habeas corpus in time for his next broadcast. Honest John, a safe cracker whose release from prison was championed by Cranston, bursts into the studio and demands at gun point that Cranston exonerate him; the police suspect that he committed the Morton robbery. Weston rushes to the studio but Honest John escapes.

Cranston takes Phoebe on a tour of night clubs and she identifies the man who gave her the robbery warning. Cranston poses as a European visitor and introduces himself to the man, whose name is Flotow. Flotow recognizes Phoebe and invites them to join him and his companion, Starkov, at his apartment after the bar closes. They leave together, but Cranston suspects a trap. He makes excuses to allow Phoebe and himself to depart, but they make a lunch date for the next day.

While Flotow and Starkov are waiting for Cranston to join them for lunch, Cranston breaks into Flotow's apartment and discovers Phoebe has already done the same. Cranston answers Flotow's phone; Morton's butler, believing him to be Flotow, tells him there is a meeting at the Morton home that afternoon. Flotow and Starkov return and attempt to detain Cranston and Pheobe. Moe, Cranston's driver, rescues them by flashing his "gun", which is really a cigarette case. After they leave, Morton's butler calls back and Flotow knows he is suspected.

Cranston finishes a newspaper column designed to bait Flotow. As he leaves to act on the intercepted butler's call, Cranston is forced into Moe's cab at gun point by Honest John. Cranston gets the upper hand by using Moe's "gun". After John confesses that he only came back to town to get a fresh start, Cranston reveals the fake gun and forgives the "kidnapping". Commissioner Weston is angered by Cranston's column and sends a man to arrest Cranston for withholding information from the police. The policeman gets a tip that Cranston is going to Morton's house.

Flotow and Starkov arrive at the Morton house and are admitted by the duplicitous butler. They surprise Morton's brother and force him to open the safe. As they explain their motive for killing his brother, they force him to write a "suicide" note and give him a gun with one bullet. Cranston and Honest John intervene. John holds the malefactors at gun point, while Cranston lets in the police. As Weston's assistant tries to arrest Cranston, the butler tries to sneak out the front door. Cranston throws a potted plant to hit the butler but hits Commissioner Weston as he enters the door.

Cranston's broadcast reveals the details of the case and compliments the police for their conduct of the investigation; both Weston and Heath are pleased. Cranston closes the broadcast with the line, "Crime does not pay!"

== Cast ==
- Rod La Rocque as Lamont Cranston/The Shadow
- Astrid Allwyn as Phoebe Lane
- Thomas E. Jackson as Commissioner Weston
- Oscar O'Shea as Editor Heath
- Wilhelm von Brincken as Flotow
- William Pawley as Honest John
- Walter Bonn as Stefan, Flotow's driver
- Lew Hearn as Moe, Cranston's driver
- Tenen Holtz as Starkhov
- John St. Polis as Roger Morton
- Jack Baxley as Mathews
- Lloyd Whitlock as Attorney
- Paul Panzer as Morton's Butler
