= The Shadow (magazine) =

1931–49 American hero pulp magazine

- Cover of the July 15, 1939 issue; artwork by Graves Gladney
- Publisher: Street & Smith
- First issue: 1931
- Final issue: 1949

The Shadow was an American pulp magazine that was published by Street & Smith from 1931 to 1949. Each issue contained a novel about the Shadow, a mysterious crime-fighting figure who had been invented to narrate the introductions to radio broadcasts of stories from Street & Smith's Detective Story Magazine. A line from the introduction, "Who knows what evil lurks in the hearts of men? The Shadow knows", prompted listeners to ask at newsstands for the "Shadow magazine", which convinced the publisher that a magazine based around a single character could be successful. Walter Gibson persuaded the magazine's editor, Frank Blackwell, to let him write the first novel, The Living Shadow, which appeared in the first issue, dated April 1931.

Sales were strong, and Street & Smith quickly moved it from quarterly to monthly publication, and then to twice-monthly. John Nanovic was hired as editor in 1932, and the lead stories were outlined in meetings between Nanovic, Gibson, and Henry W. Ralston, Street & Smith's business manager. Gibson wrote every Shadow story for several years; from the mid-1930s he was assisted by Theodore Tinsley, who wrote almost thirty of the novels. Paper shortages during World War II forced Street & Smith to reduce the magazine's format from pulp to digest-sized. Pulp historians consider the quality of the fiction to have dropped after the 1930s. Gibson stopped writing the novels in 1946 over a contract dispute with Street & Smith, and the novels were written in his stead by Bruce Elliott; these stories, in which the Shadow is mostly a background figure, are held in low esteem by fans. Gibson returned to Street & Smith in 1948, but in 1949 Street & Smith ceased publication of their remaining pulp titles, including The Shadow. The final issue was dated Fall 1949.

The success of The Shadow made it very influential, and many other single-character pulps soon appeared, featuring a lead novel in every issue about the magazine's main character. Street & Smith quickly followed up with Doc Savage, and other publishers launched The Spider, The Phantom Detective, and titles in other genres such as Westerns and science fiction.

== Publication history ==
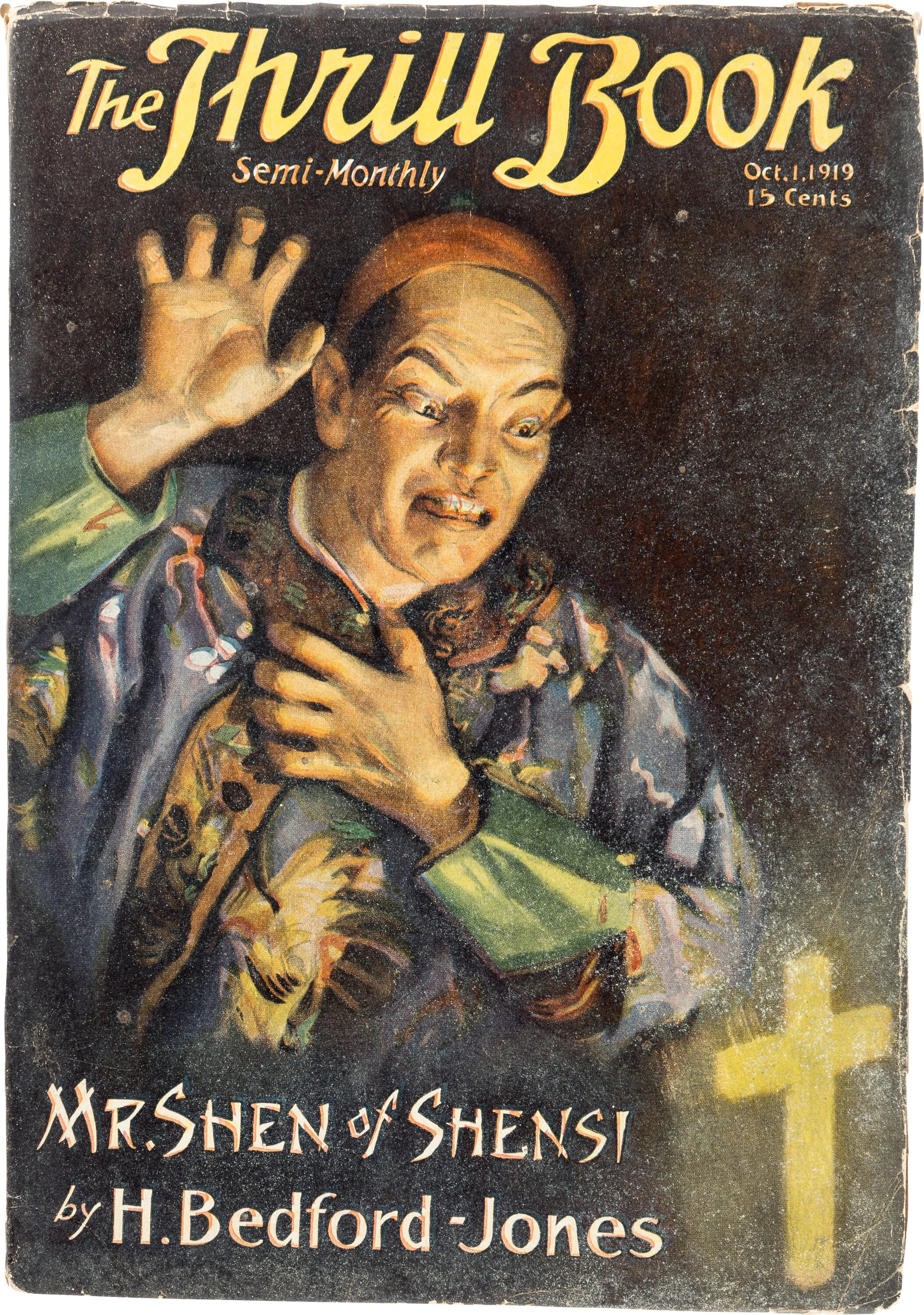
Cover of the first issue, by Modest Stein, showing the original appearance of the artwork on the October 1, 1919, issue of The Thrill Book at left. Gibson was forced to rewrite the lead novel to include a character resembling the cover image.

In 1915, New York City publishers Street & Smith began publication of Detective Story Magazine, the first specialist genre pulp magazine. In 1930, CBS began The Detective Story Hour (actually a half-hour), a radio program that used scripts based on stories from the magazine. The scriptwriter, Harry Engman Charlot, suggested that the show should be introduced by a mysterious character. In the first episode, at 9:30 p.m. on July 31, 1930, James La Curto spoke the line: "Who knows what evil lurks in the hearts of men? The Shadow knows." La Curto left after a few weeks for a role in a Broadway play, and was replaced in the role by Frank Readick Jr. The show only lasted for a year, but listeners started asking at newsstands for a copy of "the Shadow magazine", and though they were actually asking for Detective Story Magazine, Street & Smith realized there was a demand waiting to be filled.

Henry W. Ralston, Street & Smith's business manager, decided that this was an opportunity to revive the idea of a magazine based around a single character. This had been done in the days of the dime novels, with characters such as Nick Carter and Frank Merriwell, but had never been tried with pulp magazines. Ralston was also concerned that other publishers might try to cash in on the demand by creating magazines with similar characters. He asked Frank Blackwell, the editor of Detective Story Magazine, to launch The Shadow, and provided him with an old manuscript of a Nick Carter novel that had never been published. Walter Gibson, a professional magician who had done ghostwriting and worked as a reporter, happened to be visiting Blackwell's office one day in December 1930, and persuaded Blackwell to give him the job of rewriting the novel; Gibson was told that if the first issue did well, the magazine would continue publication and he would be commissioned to write three more novels. The publication date was only two months distant, so Gibson began work that night while on a train to Philadelphia.

Pulp historians Will Murray and Robert Weinberg suggest that Street & Smith's expectations for the magazine must have been low, because they reused old cover art, rather than commissioning something new. The cover showed a Chinese man, with his dark shadow visible behind him; according to pulp historian Ron Goulart it was the only cover art the Street & Smith staff had been able to find with a shadow, but in fact the original artwork had a dark background, rather than a clearly outlined shadow. Gibson had to quickly change the manuscript to add a Chinese character to the plot.

The first issue was dated April 1931, with the lead novel appearing under the byline "Maxwell Grant", a name invented by Gibson, but which Street & Smith owned; it was used as the byline for all the Shadow novels, including those by other writers. (Note: Despite the April 1931 cover date, in December 1930 the publication date was two months away, as noted in the discussion of Gibson and Blackwell's conversation, because cover dates for magazines represent the date a magazine comes off newsstands, not the date it goes on sale.) The schedule was initially quarterly, with the second issue dated July–September 1931, but both issues sold out and Street & Smith moved The Shadow to a monthly schedule starting with the third issue, dated October 1931. This lasted for a year, and in October 1932 a twice-monthly schedule began, with the issues dated on the 1st and 15th of each month. This meant Gibson had to write two complete novels each month. Starting with the April 1932 issue, Street & Smith assigned John Nanovic as the editor of The Shadow, and he, Ralston, and Gibson met regularly to plot the stories. Gibson would provide a detailed outline, and the three would agree on changes that Gibson would incorporate in the final draft. The pace that Gibson had to write at was so fast that his fingers sometimes bled.

Circulation rose quickly, reaching 300,000, a figure achieved by very few pulps. In 1935 Ralston and Nanovic began to vary the style of the novels, asking Gibson to write action-oriented rather than plot-centric fiction, and at the same time decided to bring in another author to write some of the novels and reduce Gibson's workload. The new author was Theodore Tinsley, whose first contribution appeared in the November 1, 1936 issue, titled Partners of Peril. Tinsley wrote nearly thirty of the lead novels over the next seven years.

In 1943 wartime paper shortages forced Street & Smith to reduce The Shadow from pulp format to digest size. Nanovic left at the end of the year, and his place was taken by Babette Rosmond in June 1944. Tinsley also left, and Gibson took over writing all the lead novels once again, but because of a contract dispute between him and Street & Smith, the task of writing the novels was turned over to Bruce Elliott starting with the August 1946 issue. The schedule changed to bimonthly during Elliott's tenure as writer, but the change did not help sales. Gibson finally returned for the August–September 1948 issue, with the dispute resolved. Rosmond was replaced at the end of 1948 by Daisy Bacon, who persuaded Ralston to return to the old pulp format for the next issue, now on a quarterly schedule, dated Winter 1948. Bacon claimed to a friend that circulation rose by a quarter for that issue, but only three more appeared. The last issue was dated Summer 1949: that year Street & Smith cancelled most of their remaining pulp magazines, including Detective Story, Western Story, and Doc Savage, as well as The Shadow, having decided that the future lay in their slick magazines such as Mademoiselle. The announcement came in April 1949. Bacon was let go, and her half-sister and editorial assistant, Esther Ford Robinson, was kept on to manage the final issues of Bacon's magazines, including The Shadow.

== Contents and reception ==
Issue data for The Shadow
	Spring			Summer			Fall			Winter		
	Jan	Feb	Mar	Apr	May	Jun	Jul	Aug	Sep	Oct	Nov	Dec
1931				1/1			1/2			1/3	1/4	1/5
1932	1/6	2/1	2/2	2/3	2/4	2/5	2/6	3/1	3/2	3/3, 3/4	3/5, 3/6	4/1, 4/2
1933	4/3, 4/4	4/5, 4/6	5/1, 5/2	5/3, 5/4	5/5, 5/6	6/1, 6/2	6/3, 6/4	6/5, 6/6	7/1, 7/2	7/3, 7/4	7/5, 7/6	8/1, 8/2
1934	8/3, 8/4	8/5, 8/6	9/1, 9/2	9/3, 9/4	9/5, 9/6	10/1, 10/2	10/3, 10/4	10/5, 10/6	11/1, 11/2	11/3, 11/4	11/5, 11/6	12/1, 12/2
1935	12/3, 12/4	12/5, 12/6	13/1, 13/2	13/3, 13/4	13/5, 13/6	14/1, 14/2	14/3, 14/4	14/5, 14/6	15/1, 15/2	15/3, 15/4	15/5, 15/6	16/1, 16/2
1936	16/3, 16/4	16/5, 16/6	17/1, 17/2	17/3, 17/4	17/5, 17/6	18/1, 18/2	18/3, 18/4	18/5, 18/6	19/1, 19/2	19/3, 19/4	19/5, 19/6	20/1, 20/2
1937	20/3, 20/4	20/5, 20/6	21/1, 21/2	21/3, 21/4	21/5, 21/6	22/1, 22/2	22/3, 22/4	22/5, 22/6	23/1, 23/2	23/3, 23/4	23/5, 23/6	24/1, 24/2
1938	24/3, 24/4	24/5, 24/6	25/1, 25/2	25/3, 25/4	25/5, 25/6	26/1, 26/2	26/3, 26/4	26/5, 26/6	27/1, 27/2	27/3, 27/4	27/5, 27/6	28/1, 28/2
1939	28/3, 28/4	28/5, 28/6	29/1, 29/2	29/3, 29/4	29/5, 29/6	30/1, 30/2	30/3, 30/4	30/5, 30/6	31/1, 31/2	31/3, 31/4	31/5, 31/6	32/1, 32/2
1940	32/3, 32/4	32/5, 32/6	33/1, 33/2	33/3, 33/4	33/5, 33/6	34/1, 34/2	34/3, 34/4	34/5, 34/6	35/1, 35/2	35/3, 35/4	35/5, 35/6	36/1, 36/2
1941	36/3, 36/4	36/5, 36/6	37/1, 37/2	37/3, 37/4	37/5, 37/6	38/1, 38/2	38/3, 38/4	38/5, 38/6	39/1, 39/2	39/3, 39/4	39/5, 39/6	40/1, 40/2
1942	40/3, 40/4	40/5, 40/6	41/1, 41/2	41/3, 41/4	41/5, 41/6	42/1, 42/2	42/3, 42/4	42/5, 42/6	43/1, 43/2	43/3, 43/4	43/5, 43/6	44/1, 44/2
1943	44/3, 44/4	44/5, 44/6	45/1	45/2	45/3	45/4	45/5	45/6	46/1	46/2	46/3	46/4
1944	46/5	46/6	47/1	47/2	47/3	47/4	47/5	47/6	48/1	48/2	48/3	48/4
1945	48/5	48/6	49/1	49/2	49/3	49/4	49/5	49/6	50/1	50/2	50/3	50/4
1946	50/5	50/6	51/1	51/2	51/3	51/4	51/5	51/6	52/1	52/2	52/3	52/4
1947	52/5	52/6		53/1		53/2		53/3		53/4		53/5
1948	53/5	53/6		54/1		54/2		54/3		54/4		
1949	54/5			54/6			55/1					
Issues of The Shadow, showing volume and issue number, with two designations per month for the period when the magazine was published twice per month; the first volume issue number is for the issue dated on the first of the month, and second for the issue dated on the fifteenth of the month. The issue at the end of 1947 was dated December 1947/January 1948 so is shown on two rows. Underlining indicates that an issue was titled as a quarterly (e.g."Fall 1949") rather than as a monthly. The colors identify the editors for each issue: Frank Blackwell & Lon Murray John Nanovic Charles Moran Babette Rosmond William De Grouchy Daisy Bacon

The Shadow established the format for the single-character pulps that followed it: every issue featured a novel about the main character, though the additional short stories accompanying it did not. The first novel, titled The Living Shadow, begins with a young man being saved from suicide by a stranger whose "face was entirely obscured by a broad-brimmed felt hat bent downward over the features". The young man swears allegiance to the mysterious crime fighter, and becomes the Shadow's assistant in his crusade. The second novel, Eyes of the Shadow, reveals that the Shadow's real identity is a millionaire, Lamont Cranston, but Street & Smith decided to retain the air of mystery that came with not knowing who the Shadow was, and in the third novel, The Shadow Laughs, the reader discovers that the Shadow impersonates Cranston at times, but keeps his true name secret. Over the succeeding novels Gibson provided the occasional hint to the Shadow's past, including a role as a spy during World War I, and eventually, in 1937, the Shadow's true name is revealed as Kent Allard. The Shadow's abilities included stage magic, hypnosis, marksmanship, and brilliant deductive powers. In the earlier novels, Gibson gave the Shadow supernatural abilities: for example, criminals who saw his face would die, but these capabilities disappeared after the revelation of the Shadow's identity. The Shadow's opponents were criminals too powerful to be effectively opposed by the police, and in some cases their powers were science fictional as well as criminal, with death rays appearing in more than one story, and robots and even supernatural forces as antagonists. Murray and Weinberg estimate that about 25 of the novels were science fiction—a small proportion of Gibson's output, but a remarkably high number of science fiction novels for a single author to have written.

The Shadow had a group of regular associates who were featured in many of the novels: Harry Vincent, a young man who acted as the Shadow's aide; Rutledge Mann, an investment broker; Cliff Marsland, a wrongly-imprisoned innocent man; Clyde Burke, a reporter; and Joe Cardona, a police detective.

Murray considers that Gibson's ability to vary the plots from novel to novel, with a wide range of backdrops, characters, and plot devices, was the key to attracting and retaining readers. Gibson's work varied in quality over the years: in Murray's view, after 1941 the novels became "repetitious, sometimes lifeless...even becoming inadvertent parodies of their former selves". According to pulp historian Ed Hulse, fans of the Shadow regard the magazine's best period as beginning in 1934, and Hulse himself considers 1935 the best year, singling out Zemba, from the December 1 issue, as a favorite of many readers, and identifying Lingo, in the April 1 issue, as his own candidate for Gibson's best work. Hulse agrees with Murray that the early 1940s saw the quality of the novels drop off, but identifies 1937, when the Shadow's identity is revealed, as the start of the decline. Another pulp historian, Lee Server, argues that Gibson was the perfect writer for The Shadow novels, because of his knowledge of magic and the history of magic: "The stories were the literary equivalent of a master illusionist's stage act, full of tricks, threats of sudden death, and mysterious atmosphere". Goulart suggests that initially Gibson took this too far, with the early Shadow stories containing too much in the way of tricks and surprises, and not enough of the Shadow himself: "The effect is something like a magic show with lots of tricks and no star magician".

Tinsley's work included more violence and more sexually oriented material than Gibson's, though Murray comments that Tinsley's first Shadow novels were essentially imitations of Gibson's style. One of Tinsley's novels, Satan's Signature, is described by Murray as having been too much of a "taboo-breaker" for Street & Smith to publish it in The Shadow; it eventually appeared in Clues, another Street & Smith magazine, after Tinsley rewrote it to eliminate the Shadow from the plot. Elliott's fifteen Shadow novels in the 1940s are "held in low esteem by pulp devotees, and not entirely without reason", according to Hulse. They featured Lamont Cranston as the main character, rather than the Shadow himself, and were short, and relegated to the back of the magazine by the editor, Rosmond, who was "not a fan of the hero pulps", in Hulse's words. Goulart is less critical of Elliott, describing his work as "less melodramatic...clearly an attempt to update the character".

Each issue included short stories, all in the detective genre, by writers such as Frank Gruber, Norman Daniels, and John D. MacDonald. There were also nonfiction departments such as a regular letter column and a club column. The first four covers for The Shadow (not including the reused art by Modest Stein pressed into service for the first issue) were painted by Jerome Rozen; with the January 1932 issue, Jerome's brother, George Rozen, took over, and became the magazine's best-known cover artist. Street & Smith's associate art editor, Bill Lawlor, is reputed to be the model for depictions of the Shadow: Lawlor is supposed to have kept a suitable cape and hat in his office. Graves Gladney became a frequent cover artist between 1938 and 1941, painting seventy covers. The interior art was often by Tom Lovell in the early years; he was followed by Edd Cartier and Earl Mayan, and then during the war by Paul Orban. Cartier returned as an illustrator after the war, as did Orban for the final few issues.

The Shadow was the first pulp magazine to try the "hero pulp" format, in which novels about a single character take the lead position in every issue, and its success made it very influential. Street & Smith followed it in 1933 with Doc Savage, in the adventure genre, though with many science-fictional plots. Other publishers quickly cashed in on the new genre: Ned Pines' Thrilling Group came out with The Phantom Detective in February 1933, and Popular Publications launched The Spider, also about a crime-fighter, in October 1933. Over the next few years, single-character pulps were tried in other genres, including Westerns (such as Pete Rice Magazine, from Street & Smith), science fiction (Captain Future, from Thrilling Group), and many more.

== Bibliographic details ==
Street & Smith published 325 issues of The Shadow between April 1931 and Summer 1949. The editor was initially Frank Blackwell, with the assistance of Lon Murray; John Nanovic took over with the April 1932 issue and stayed until November 1943. Charles Moran took over for five issues, from December 1943 to May 1944, and was replaced by Babette Rosmond. Rosmond's successor was William De Grouchy, who only edited a single issue, dated August/September 1948; the remaining four issues, from Winter 1948 to Fall 1949, were edited by Daisy Bacon.

It was pulp format for all issues except December 1943 to September 1948, which were digest-sized. All issues were 128 pages. The price began at 10 cents, switched to 15 cents in April 1943, and went to 25 cents with the February/March 1947 issue. The volume numbering was entirely regular, with six issues per volume; the last issue was volume 55, number 1. The first two issues were dated April 1931 and July–September 1931; it was then monthly from October 1931 to September 1932, and appeared on the 1st and 15th of each month from October 1932 until the March 1, 1943 issue, which was followed by April 1943, inaugurating a monthly sequence that ran until January 1947. It switched to bimonthly the following month, and then to quarterly from the Fall 1948 issue to the final issue, Summer 1949. The title was originally The Shadow, a Detective Magazine; this changed after two issues to The Shadow, a Detective Monthly, which also lasted for only two issues. With the December 1931 issue it became The Shadow Detective Monthly, and then when the schedule changed to twice a month, in October 1932, it became The Shadow Magazine. Beginning with the August 15, 1937 issue this was simplified to just The Shadow. Towards the end of the run there were two more changes: the February–March 1947 issue was titled Shadow Mystery; this lasted for ten issues, and then the last four issues, from Fall 1948 to Summer 1949, were changed back to The Shadow.

Many of the novels from The Shadow have been reprinted, and new novels featuring the Shadow began to appear in 1964. The character has also appeared in comics, and in the 1994 film The Shadow, with Alec Baldwin in the title role.

== Sources ==
- Ashley, Mike (2000). The Time Machines:The Story of the Science-Fiction Pulp Magazines from the beginning to 1950. Liverpool: Liverpool University Press. ISBN 0-85323-865-0.
- Ashley, Mike (2005). Transformations: The Story of the Science Fiction Magazines from 1950 to 1970. Liverpool: Liverpool University Press. ISBN 0-85323-779-4.
- Goulart, Ron (1973) [1972]. An Informal History of the Pulp Magazines. New York City: Ace Books. ISBN 0-441-37070-5.
- Harmon, Jim (2011). Radio Mystery and Adventure and Its Appearances in Film, Television and Other Media. Jefferson, North Carolina: McFarland, Incorporated, Publishers. ISBN 9780786485086.
- Harmon, Jim (2015). The Great Radio Heroes. Jefferson, North Carolina: McFarland, Incorporated, Publishers. ISBN 9780786483655.
- Hulse, Ed (2013). The Blood'n'Thunder Guide to Pulp Fiction. Morris Plains, New Jersey: Murania Press. ISBN 978-1491010938.
- Murray, Will (1983). "The Shadow Magazine". In Cook, Michael L. (ed.). Mystery, Detective, and Espionage Magazines. Westport, Connecticut: Greenwood Press. pp. 486–491. ISBN 0-313-23310-1.
- Murray, Will; Weinberg, Robert (1985). "The Shadow". In Tymn, Marshall B.; Ashley, Mike (eds.). Science Fiction, Fantasy and Weird Fiction Magazines. Westport, Connecticut: Greenwood Press. pp. 570–573. ISBN 0-3132-1221-X.
- Powers, Laurie (2019). Queen of the Pulps: The Reign of Daisy Bacon and Love Story Magazine. Jefferson, North Carolina: MacFarland and Company, Inc., Publishers. ISBN 9781476673967.
- Server, Lee (2002). Pulp Fiction Writers. New York City: Checkmark Books. ISBN 0-8160-4577-1.
- Sterling, Christopher H., ed. (2004). Encyclopedia of Radio. New York City: Fitzroy Dearborn. ISBN 9781135456498.
- Weinberg, Robert (1985). "Doc Savage". In Tymn, Marshall B.; Ashley, Mike (eds.). Science Fiction, Fantasy and Weird Fiction Magazines. Westport, Connecticut: Greenwood Press. pp. 183–185. ISBN 0-3132-1221-X.
