= Graves Gladney =

American illustrator (1907-1976)

- Born: James Francis Graves Gladney; December 11, 1907; St. Louis, Missouri, U.S.
- Died: March 24, 1976 (aged 68); St. Louis, Missouri, U.S.
- Education: Amherst College; Académie Julian; Slade School of Fine Art
- Known for: pulp magazine covers

James Francis Graves Gladney (December 11, 1907 – March 24, 1976) was an illustrator known for his cover paintings for Street & Smith pulp magazines, especially The Shadow.

He was the son of Katherine Lewis Graves and Franklin Young Gladney, a successful lawyer and author of several articles and books on patent law. After graduating from high school, Gladney attended Amherst College, from which he graduated in 1928. After the end of World War II, he accepted a job as a teacher at the Washington University in St. Louis School of Fine Arts.

He was a keen big game hunter and trap shooter and so, being a marksman, he served as a gunnery instructor in World War 2. Posted to the 82nd Airborne Division, he made airborne landings during the Normandy invasion and Operation Market Garden. He was, at his death, professor of fine arts at Washington University in St. Louis. The original oil painting of his January 1941 cover for The Shadow was exhibited at the university's Olin Business School. This was from his main period of activity for The Shadow, producing all the covers from April 1939 to the end of 1941.
