= The Shadow =

Fictional character

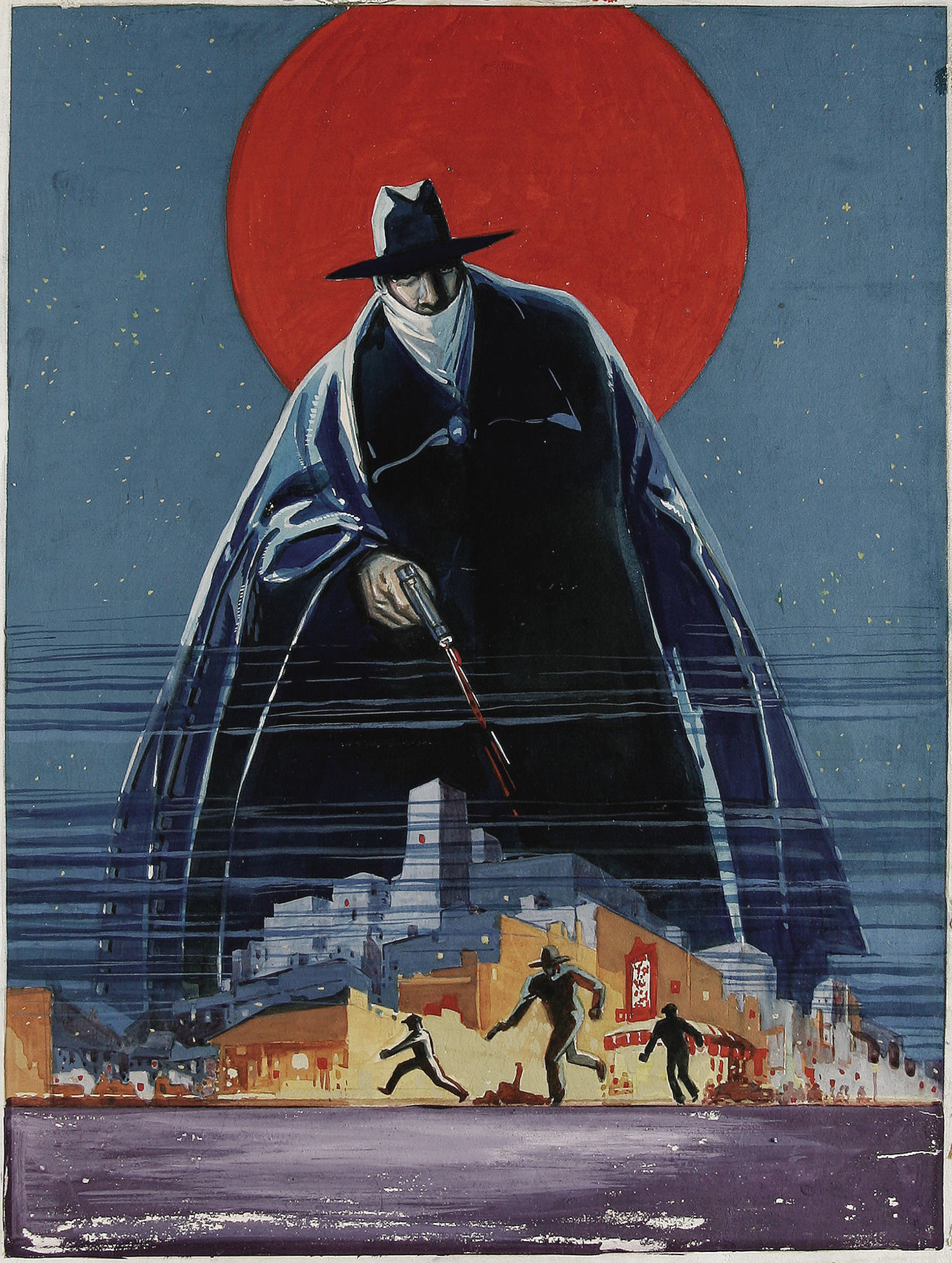
- Art by Charles Coll

Publication information
- Publisher: Street & Smith; Condé Nast
- First appearance: Detective Story Hour (July 31, 1930) (radio); The Living Shadow (April 1, 1931) (print)
- Created by: Harry Engman Charlot (name); Walter B. Gibson (character)

In-story information
- Alter ego: Kent Allard (print); Lamont Cranston (radio and film)
- Notable aliases: Lamont Cranston (print); Henry Arnaud (print); Isaac Twambley (print); Fritz the Janitor (print)
- Abilities: In print, radio, and film: Expert detective; Skilled marksman and hand-to-hand combatant; Master of disguise and stealth; In radio and film only: Various psychic abilities such as reading people's thoughts, controlling their minds, and altering their perceptions, enabling him to turn himself invisible (except for his shadow, which cannot be hidden, for unknown reasons); Low-level telekinesis (with small objects such as knives or glass debris); Low-level superhuman strength (able to lift a sturdy armored warrior with only one hand)

The Shadow is a fictional character created by American magazine publishers Street & Smith and writer Walter B. Gibson. Originally created to be a mysterious radio-show narrator and developed into a distinct literary character in 1931 by Gibson, the Shadow has been adapted into other media, including American comic books, comic strips, serials, video games, and at least five feature films. The radio drama included episodes voiced by Orson Welles.

The Shadow debuted on July 31, 1930, as the mysterious narrator of the radio program Detective Story Hour, created to boost sales of Street & Smith's monthly pulp Detective Story Magazine. When listeners of the program began asking at newsstands for copies of "that Shadow detective magazine", Street & Smith launched a magazine based on the character, and hired Gibson to create a concept to fit the name and voice and to write a story featuring him. The first issue of the pulp series The Shadow magazine went on sale April 1, 1931.

On September 26, 1937, The Shadow, a new radio drama based on the character as created by Gibson for the pulp magazine, premiered with the story "The Death House Rescue", in which the Shadow was characterized as having "the hypnotic power to cloud men's minds so they cannot see him". In the magazine stories, the Shadow did not become literally invisible.

The introductory line from the radio adaptation of The Shadow – "Who knows what evil lurks in the hearts of men? The Shadow knows!" – spoken by actor Frank Readick, has earned a place in the American idiom.

== Publication history ==
=== Origin of the character's name ===
To boost the sales of its Detective Story Magazine, Street & Smith Publications hired David Chrisman, of the Ruthrauff & Ryan advertising agency, and writer-director William Sweets to adapt the magazine's stories into a radio series. Chrisman and Sweets thought the upcoming series should be narrated by a mysterious storyteller with a sinister voice and began searching for a suitable name. One of their scriptwriters, Harry Engman Charlot, suggested various possibilities, such as "The Inspector" or "The Sleuth". Charlot then proposed the ideal name for the phantom announcer: "The Shadow".

Thus, beginning on July 31, 1930, "The Shadow" was the name given to the mysterious narrator of the Detective Story Hour radio program. The narrator was initially voiced by James LaCurto, who was replaced after four months by prolific character actor Frank Readick Jr. The episodes were drawn from the Detective Story Magazine issued by Street & Smith, the nation's oldest and largest publisher of pulp magazines at the time. Although the latter company had hoped the radio broadcasts would boost the declining sales of Detective Story Magazine, the result was quite different. Listeners found the sinister announcer much more compelling than the unrelated stories. They soon began asking newsdealers for copies of "that Shadow detective magazine", even though it did not exist.

=== Creation as a distinctive literary character ===
"Who knows what evil lurks in the hearts of men?" The Shadow as depicted on the cover of the July 15, 1939, issue of The Shadow Magazine. The story, "Death from Nowhere", was one of the magazine plots adapted for the legendary radio drama.

Recognizing the demand and responding promptly, circulation manager Henry William Ralston of Street & Smith commissioned Walter B. Gibson to begin writing stories about "The Shadow". Using the pen name of Maxwell Grant and claiming the stories were "from The Shadow's private annals" as told to him, Gibson wrote 282 out of 325 tales over the next 20 years: a novel-length story twice a month (1st and 15th). The first story produced was The Living Shadow published April 1, 1931.

Gibson's characterization of The Shadow laid the foundations for the archetype of the superhero, including stylized imagery and title, sidekicks, supervillains, and a secret identity. Clad in black, The Shadow operated mainly after dark as a vigilante in the name of justice, terrifying criminals into vulnerability. Gibson himself claimed the literary inspirations upon which he had drawn were Bram Stoker's Dracula and Edward Bulwer-Lytton's "The House and the Brain". Another possible inspiration for The Shadow is the French character Judex; the first episode of the original Judex film serial was released in the United States as The Mysterious Shadow, and Judex's costume is similar to The Shadow's. French comics historian Xavier Fournier notes other similarities with another silent serial, The Shielding Shadow, whose protagonist had a power of invisibility, and considers The Shadow to be a mix between the two characters. In the 1940s, some Shadow comic strips were translated in France as adventures of Judex.

Because of the great effort involved in writing two full-length novels every month, several guest writers were hired to write occasional installments in order to lighten Gibson's workload. Those guest writers included Lester Dent, who also wrote the Doc Savage stories, and Theodore Tinsley. In the late 1940s, mystery novelist Bruce Elliott (also a magician) temporarily replaced Gibson as the primary author of the pulp series (he wrote #'s 306 through 320). Richard Wormser, a reader for Street & Smith, wrote two Shadow stories. For a complete list of Street and Smith's Shadow novels (and a list of the reprint editions), see the List of The Shadow stories article.

=== A new beginning at Belmont Books ===
The Shadow Magazine ceased publication with the Summer 1949 issue, but Walter B. Gibson wrote three new "official" stories between 1963 and 1980. The first began a new series of nine Shadow mass market paperback novels from Belmont Books. In this series, The Shadow is given psychic powers, including the radio character's ability "to cloud men's minds", so that he effectively became invisible. Return of The Shadow was published under his own name. The remaining eight novels in this series, The Shadow Strikes, Shadow Beware, Cry Shadow, The Shadow's Revenge, Mark of The Shadow, Shadow Go Mad, Night of The Shadow, and The Shadow, Destination: Moon, were written by Dennis Lynds, not Gibson, under the Maxwell Grant pseudonym.

The other two Gibson works were the novelettes "The Riddle of the Rangoon Ruby", published June 1, 1979 in The Shadow Scrapbook. and "Blackmail Bay", published February 1, 1980 in The Duende History of The Shadow Magazine.

=== Literary sequels and reboots ===
The Shadow returned in 2015 in the authorized novel The Sinister Shadow, an entry in the Wild Adventures of Doc Savage series from Altus Press. The novel, written by Will Murray, used unpublished material originally written in 1932 by Doc Savage originator Lester Dent and published under the pen name Kenneth Robeson. Set in 1933, the story details the conflict between the two pulp magazine icons during a crime wave caused by a murderous kidnapping-extortion ring led by the mysterious criminal mastermind known as the Funeral Director.

A sequel, Empire of Doom, was published in 2016 and takes place seven years later in 1940. The Shadow's old enemy, Shiwan Khan, attacks his hated adversary. Doc Savage joins forces with The Shadow to vanquish Khan in a Doc Savage novel written by Murray, from a concept by Dent.

In 2020, James Patterson Entertainment and Condé Nast Entertainment announced a new series written by James Patterson and Brian Sitts. The arrangement also includes potential screen adaptations of these novels. The first novel, The Shadow, released in 2021, serves as a sequel-update with some science-fiction elements, bringing Lamont Cranston from 1937 into 2087 to battle Shiwan Khan in a futuristic New York. The second Patterson-Sitts Shadow novel, Circle of Death, was published in 2023.

== Character development ==
The character and look of The Shadow gradually evolved over his lengthy fictional existence:

As depicted in the pulps, The Shadow wore a wide-brimmed black hat and a black, crimson-lined cloak with an upturned collar over a standard black business suit. In the 1940s comic books, the later comic book series, and the 1994 film starring Alec Baldwin, he wore either the black hat or a wide-brimmed, black fedora and a crimson scarf just below his nose and across his mouth and chin. Both the cloak and scarf covered either a black double-breasted trench coat or a regular black suit. As seen in some of the later comics series, The Shadow also would wear his hat and scarf with either a black Inverness coat or Inverness cape.

In the radio drama that debuted in 1937, The Shadow does not wear a costume because he is invisible when he operates as a vigilante, a feature born out of necessity. Time constraints of 1930s radio made it difficult to explain to listeners where The Shadow was hiding and how he remained concealed from criminals until he was ready to strike, so the character was given invisibility, meaning the criminals (like the radio audience) only knew him by his haunting voice. The actors used their normal voice when the hero was in his civilian identity of Lamont Cranston and effects were added when he became invisible and acted as The Shadow, his voice now having a sinister and seemingly omnipresent quality. To explain this power, radio episodes regularly said that while a young man, The Shadow traveled around the world and then through the Orient, where he learned how to read thoughts and became a master of hypnotism, granting him "the mysterious power to cloud men's minds, so they could not see him". In the episode "The Temple Bells of Neban" (1937), The Shadow said he developed these abilities in India specifically, under the guidance of a "Yogi priest" who was "Keeper of the Temple of Cobras" in Delhi. He does not wear a mask or any disguise while invisible, and so in episodes such as "The Temple Bells of Neban" he is cautious when he meets an enemy who could potentially disrupt his hypnotic abilities, exposing his true face and instantly making him a visible target for attack.

=== Background ===
In the print adventures, The Shadow is Kent Allard, although his real name is not revealed until The Shadow Unmasks (1937). Early stories explain he was once a famed aviator who fought for the French during World War I, known by the alias the "Black Eagle" according to one character in The Shadow's Shadow (1933). Later stories revised this alias as the "Dark Eagle", beginning with The Shadow Unmasks. After the war's conclusion, Allard finds a new challenge in waging war on criminals. Allard falsifies his death by crash landing his plane in Guatemala, encountering the indigenous "Xinca tribe" as a result, who see him as a supernatural being and provide him with two loyal aides. Allard returns to the United States and takes residence in New York City, adopting numerous identities to acquire valuable information and conceal his true nature, and recruiting a variety of agents to aid his war on crime, only a few of whom are aware of his other identities.

As the vigilante called The Shadow, Allard hunts down and often violently confronts criminals, armed with M1911 pistols and sometimes using magician tricks to convince his prey that he is supernatural. One such trick is “The Devil's Whisper”, a chemical compound on the thumb and forefinger, causing a flash of bright flame and sharp explosion when he snaps his fingers. The Shadow is also known for wearing a girasol ring with a purple stone (sometimes depicted as a red stone in cover artwork), given to Allard by the Czar of Russia (The Romanoff Jewels, 1932) during World War I. The ring is later said to be one of two rings made with gemstones taken from the eyes of an idol made by the Xinca tribe (The Shadow Unmasks, 1937).

The Shadow's best known alter ego is Lamont Cranston, a "wealthy young man-about-town". In the pulps, Cranston is a separate character, a rich playboy who travels the world while The Shadow uses his identity and resources in New York (The Shadow Laughs, 1931). The Shadow's disguise as Cranston works well because the two men resemble each other (Dictator of Crime, 1941). In their first meeting, The Shadow threatens Cranston, saying that unless the playboy agrees to allow the aviator to use his identity when he is abroad, then Allard will simply take over the man's identity entirely, having already made arrangements to begin the process, including switching signatures on various documents. Although alarmed at first, the real Lamont Cranston agrees, deciding that sharing his resources and identity is better than losing both entirely. The two men sometimes meet afterward in order to impersonate each other (Crime over Miami, 1940). As Cranston, The Shadow often attends the Cobalt Club, an exclusive restaurant and lounge catering to the wealthy, and associates with New York City Police Commissioner Ralph Weston.

The Shadow's other disguises include: businessman Henry Arnaud, who like Cranston is a real person whose identity Allard simply assumes at times, as revealed in Arnaud's first appearance The Black Master (March 1, 1932); elderly Isaac Twambley, who first appears in No Time for Murder (December 1944); and Fritz, an old, seemingly slow-witted, uncommunicative janitor who works at police headquarters, listening in on conversations and examining recovered evidence, first appearing in The Living Shadow (April 1931).

In Teeth of the Dragon and later stories including The Golden Pagoda, The Shadow is known in Chinatown as Ying Ko, often fighting the criminal Tong.

In the 2015 Altus Press novel The Sinister Shadow by Will Murray, The Shadow masquerades as celebrated criminologist George Clarendon of Chicago, a past member of the Cobalt Club and long-time friend of Commissioner Weston.

For the first half of The Shadow's tenure in the pulps, his past and true identity (outside of his Cranston disguise) are ambiguous. In The Living Shadow, a thug claiming to have seen the Shadow's face recalls seeing "a piece of white that looked like a bandage". In The Black Master and The Shadow's Shadow, the villains of both stories see The Shadow's true face and remark the vigilante is a man of many faces with no face of his own. It was not until the August 1937 issue, The Shadow Unmasks, that The Shadow's real name was revealed.

In the radio drama series that premiered in 1937, the Allard secret identity and backstory were dropped for simplicity's sake. The radio incarnation of The Shadow is really and only Lamont Cranston with no other regular cover identities, though he does adopt disguises and short-term aliases during some adventures. The radio version of Cranston travels the world to "learn the old mysteries that modern science has not yet rediscovered" ("Death House Rescue" in 1937). Along with learning skills and knowledge in Europe, Africa, and Asia, he spends time training with a Yogi priest, "Keeper of the Temple of Cobras", in Delhi and learns how to read thoughts and hypnotize people enough to "cloud" their minds, making himself invisible to them (as revealed in the episode "The Temple Bells of Neban" in 1937). He explicitly states in several episodes that his talents are not magic but based on science. Returning to New York, he decides he can best aid the police and his city by operating outside the law as an invisible vigilante. He is somewhat less ruthless and more compassionate than the pulp incarnation, and without the vast network of agents and operatives. Only cab driver/chauffeur Shrevvy makes regular appearances on the radio series, but the character is different from his print counterpart. Commissioner Weston and a few other supporting characters from the print stories also are adapted to radio.

=== Supporting characters ===
Margo Lane and The Shadow. Art by Alex Ross.

The Shadow has a network of agents who assist him in his war on crime. These include:

- Harry Vincent - A man who tries to commit suicide in the first Shadow story. The Shadow saves and recruits him, after which Vincent is a regular recurring character in the pulp stories and one of the most trusted agents.
- Moses "Moe" Shrevnitz, a.k.a. "Shrevvy" - A cab driver who doubles as his chauffeur. The radio version of Shrevvy is dimwitted and does not knowingly work for The Shadow, aiding Lamont Cranston on many occasions. Peter Boyle performed the role in the 1994 film.
- Margo Lane - A socialite created for the radio drama and introduced in the debut episode "The Death House Rescue" as The Shadow's companion who loves him. Margo aids the Shadow in nearly every radio episode and was later introduced into the pulps as one of his agents. Penelope Ann Miller performed the role in the 1994 film, in which Margo had the power of telepathy, allowing her to pierce The Shadow's hypnotic mental-clouding abilities.
- Clyde Burke - A newspaper reporter who also is initially paid to collect news clippings for The Shadow.
- Burbank - A radio operator who maintains contact between The Shadow and his agents. He was portrayed by Andre Gregory in the 1994 film.
- Clifford "Cliff" Marsland - He first appeared in the ninth novel Mobsmen on the Spot. A man with a checkered past known to The Shadow, he changed his name to Clifford Marsland. Having spent years in Sing Sing maximum security prison for a crime he did not commit, he is wrongly believed by the underworld to have murdered one or more people. He infiltrates gangs using his crooked reputation (the Green Hornet is often described as having a modus operandi similar to that of Marsland).
- Dr. Rupert Sayre - The Shadow's personal physician.
- Jericho Druke - A large, immensely strong black man.
- Slade Farrow - He works with The Shadow to rehabilitate criminals.
- Miles Crofton - He sometimes pilots The Shadow's autogyro.
- Claude Fellows - The only agent of The Shadow ever shown to be killed in Gangdom's Doom (1931).
- Rutledge Mann - A stockbroker who collects information, taking over for Claude Fellows after the latter's death. First appeared in Double Z (June 1, 1932). After his business failed and he acquired heavy debt, he was ready to commit suicide before The Shadow, knowing about his situation, recruited him.
- Hawkeye - A reformed underworld snoop who trails gangsters and other criminals.
- Myra Reldon - A female operative who uses the alias of Ming Dwan when in Chinatown.
- Dr. Roy Tam - The Shadow's contact man in New York's Chinatown. Sab Shimono portrayed him in the 1994 film, in which he provided valuable scientific information to Lamont Cranston, believing the latter to be an agent of The Shadow.

Though initially wanted by the police, The Shadow also works with and through them, notably gleaning information from his many chats (as Cranston) at the Cobalt Club with NYPD Commissioner Ralph Weston and later Commissioner Wainwright Barth, who is also Cranston's uncle (portrayed by Jonathan Winters in the 1994 film). Weston believes Cranston is merely a rich playboy who dabbles in detective work out of curiosity. Another police contact is Detective (later Inspector) Joseph Cardona, a key character in many Shadow novels.

In contrast to the pulps, The Shadow radio drama limited the cast of major characters to The Shadow, Commissioner Weston, and Margo Lane, the last of whom was created for the radio series. Along with giving The Shadow a love interest, Margo was created because it was believed that including Harry Vincent as a regular would mean an overabundance of male characters (considering the criminals in the stories were usually male, too) and could possibly make it difficult for the audience to distinguish between the voices of so many male actors. The radio script for "The Death House Rescue" (reprinted in The Shadow Scrapbook) features Harry Vincent, but he did not appear in the actual radio broadcast or any episode of the radio drama series. Clyde Burke made occasional appearances, but not as an agent of The Shadow. Lieutenant Cardona was a minor character in several episodes. Moe Shrevnitz (identified only as "Shrevvy") made several appearances as a simple-minded acquaintance of Cranston and Lane who sometimes acted as their chauffeur, unaware Cranston was actually The Shadow.

=== Enemies ===
The Shadow also faces a wide variety of enemies, ranging from kingpins and mad scientists to international spies.

Among his recurring foes are:

- Shiwan Khan – A would-be conqueror who is the last living descendant of Genghis Khan. Seen in The Golden Master, Shiwan Khan Returns, The Invincible Shiwan Khan and Masters of Death. In the 1994 film, he was portrayed by actor John Lone.
- Dr. Rodil Moquino – A doctor and self-proclaimed Voodoo Master who uses hypnosis to make people do his bidding. Seen in The Voodoo Master, The City of Doom and Voodoo Trail.
- Wasp – Basil Gannaford is a criminal mastermind with a bulbous head on a tall frail body whose grasp contained an electric sting and spoke in a buzzing voice. Seen in The Wasp and The Wasp Returns.
- Benedict Stark – The self-described Prince of Evil. Seen in The Prince of Evil, The Murder Genius, The Man Who Died Twice and The Devil's Paymaster, all written by Theodore Tinsley

The only recurring criminal organization he fought was the Hand (The Hand, Murder for Sale, Chicago Crime, Crime Rides the Sea and Realm of Doom), where he defeated one Finger of the organization in each book.

In addition, the villain King Kauger from the Shadow story Wizard of Crime is the unseen mastermind behind the events of Intimidation, Inc., and the organization known as The Silent Seven was referenced in the previous title The Death Tower.

Villains Diamond Bert Farwell, Isaac Coffran, Steve Cronin, Spotter, and Birdie Crull all originated in the first two pulps and returned at least once.

The series featured a myriad of one-shot villains including: The Golden Vulture, Malmordo, The Red Blot, The Black Falcon, The Cobra, Five-Face, Li Hoang, Velma Thane, Quetzal, Judge Lawless, The Gray Ghost, The Silver Skull, Gaspard Zemba, Thade the Death Giver, Kwa the Living Joss, Mox, and The Green Terror.

In addition to The Hand and The Silent Seven, The Shadow also battled other one-shot collectives of criminals, including The Hydra, The Green Hoods, The White Skulls, The Five Chameleons, and The Salamanders.

== Radio program ==
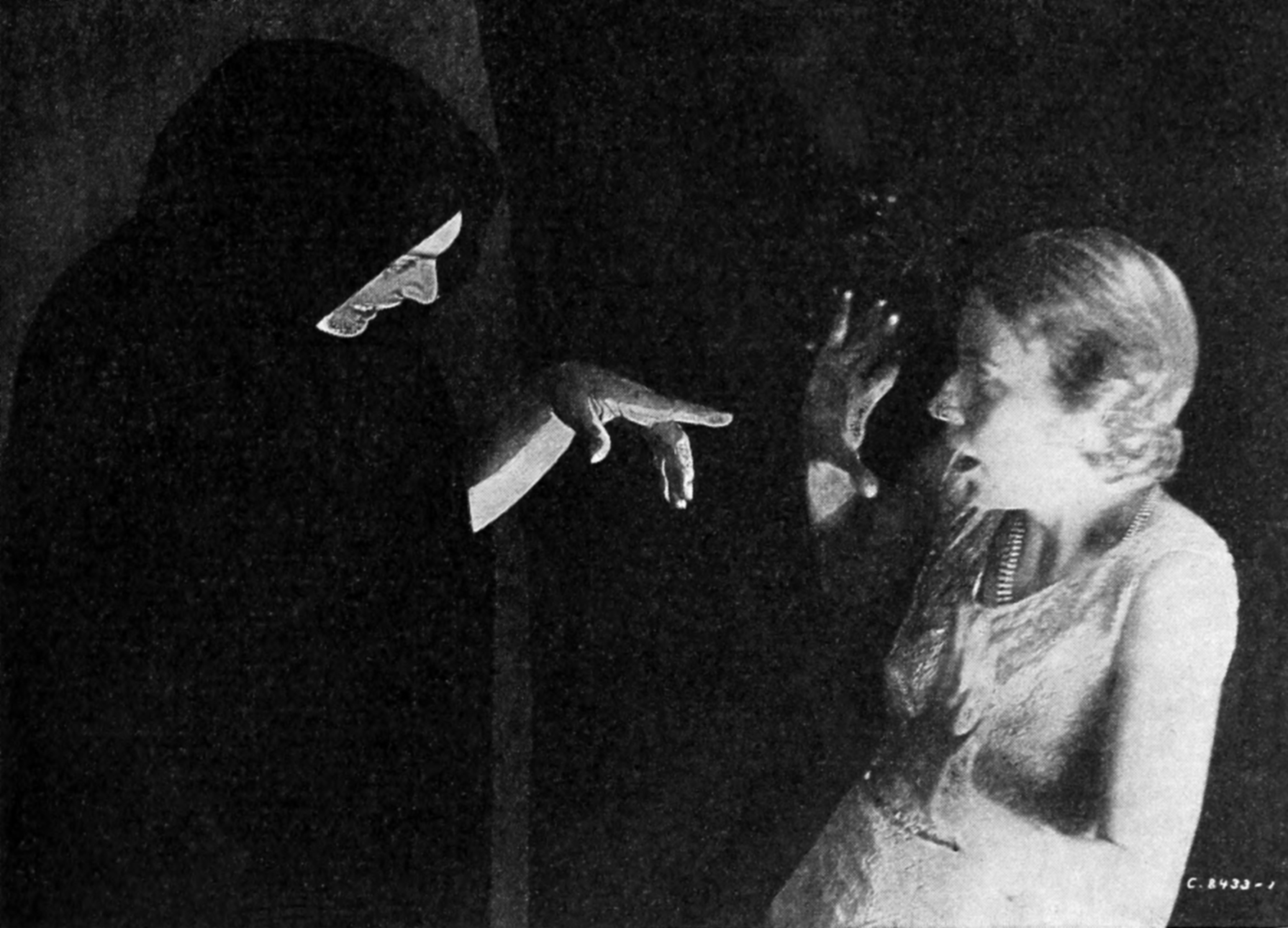
Promotional photograph for The Detective Story Hour, with James La Curto as The Shadow (1930)

In early 1930, Street & Smith hired David Chrisman and Bill Sweets to adapt the Detective Story Magazine to radio format. Chrisman and Sweets thought the program should be introduced by a mysterious storyteller. A young scriptwriter, Harry Charlot, suggested the name of "The Shadow". Thus, "The Shadow" premiered over CBS airwaves on July 31, 1930, as the host of the Detective Story Hour, narrating "tales of mystery and suspense from the pages of the premier detective fiction magazine". The bulk of the radio show was written primarily by Sidney Slon. The narrator was first voiced by James La Curto, but became a national sensation when radio veteran Frank Readick, Jr. assumed the role and gave it "a hauntingly sibilant quality that thrilled radio listeners".

=== Early years ===
Following a brief tenure as narrator of Street & Smith's Detective Story Hour, "The Shadow" character was used to host segments of The Blue Coal Radio Revue, airing on Sundays at 5:30 p.m. Eastern Standard Time. This marked the beginning of a long association between the radio persona and sponsor Blue Coal.

While functioning as a narrator of The Blue Coal Radio Revue, the character was recycled by Street & Smith in October 1931, for its newly created Love Story Hour. Contrary to dozens of encyclopedias, published reference guides, and even Walter Gibson himself, The Shadow never served as narrator of Love Story Hour. He appeared only in advertisements for The Shadow Magazine at the end of each episode.

In October 1932, the radio persona temporarily moved to NBC. Frank Readick Jr. again played the role of the sinister-voiced host on Mondays and Wednesdays, both at 6:30 p.m., with La Curto taking occasional turns as the title character.

Readick returned as The Shadow to host a final CBS mystery anthology that fall. The series disappeared from CBS airwaves on March 27, 1935, due to Street & Smith's insistence that the radio storyteller be completely replaced by the master crime-fighter described in Walter B. Gibson's ongoing pulps.

=== Radio drama ===
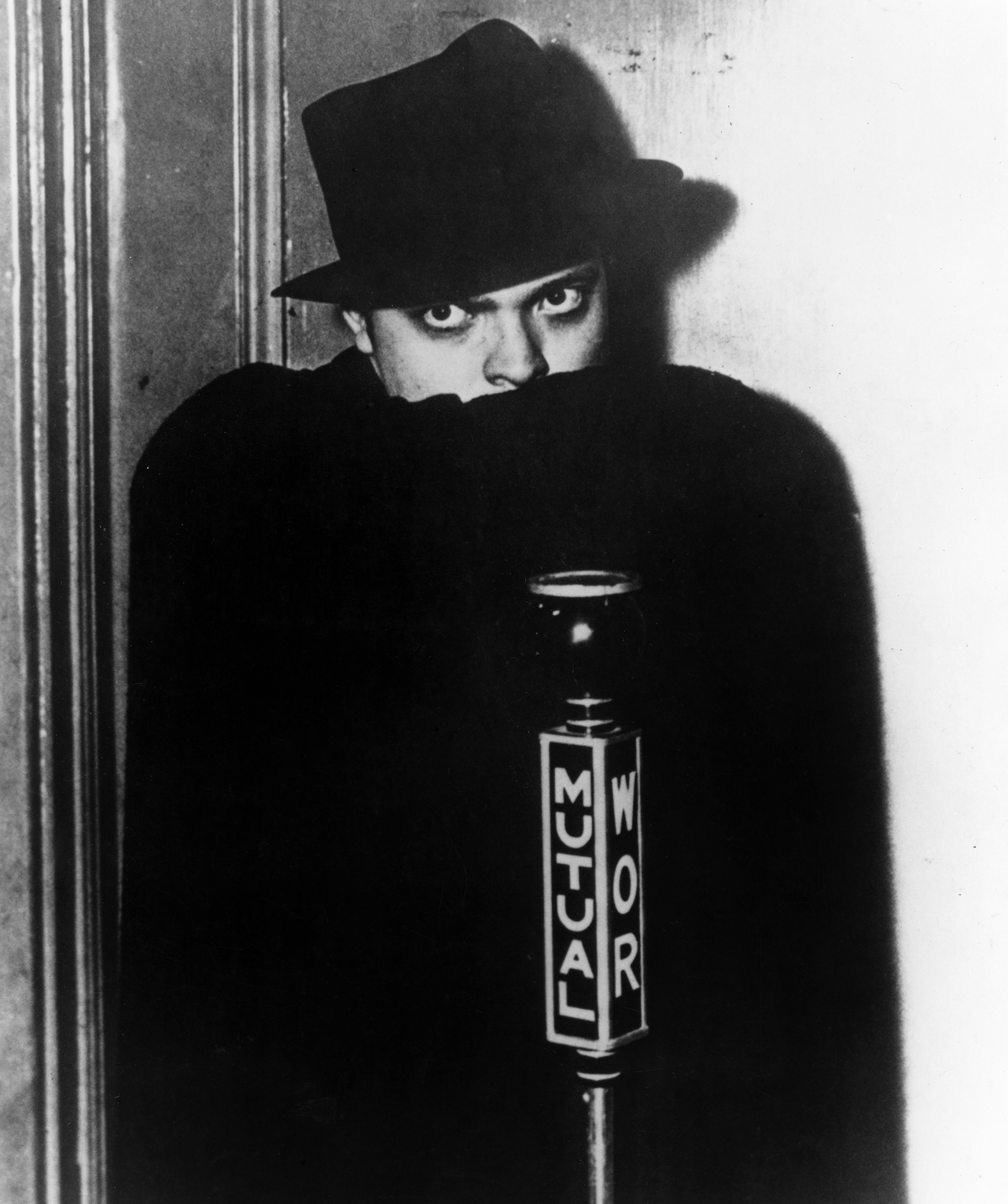
Orson Welles was the voice of The Shadow from September 1937 to October 1938

In 1934, two separate attempts were made to mount a new series featuring The Shadow as a crimefighter more akin to the character’s pulp incarnation, despite resistance from sponsor DL&W (manufacturer of Blue Coal) to the format change.

The first was initiated and scripted by Walter B. Gibson. A one-off Shadow presentation heard only on New York station WMAC in June of 1934 is assumed to have been a pilot for this series, but this is inconclusive.

The second series was produced in San Francisco by MacGregor & Sollie, a firm that distributed transcription features for syndication. Twenty-six 15-minute episodes (now lost) were produced, written by prolific radio scribe John Eugene Hasty and starring Carl Kroenke, who had also portrayed Doc Savage for the company.

Street & Smith entered into a new broadcasting agreement with Blue Coal in 1937, and that summer Gibson teamed with scriptwriter Edward Hale Bierstadt to develop the new series. The Shadow returned to network airwaves with the episode "The Death House Rescue" on September 26, 1937, over the Mutual Broadcasting System. Thus began the "official" radio drama, with 22-year-old Orson Welles starring as Lamont Cranston, a "wealthy young man about town." Once The Shadow joined Mutual as a half-hour series on Sunday evenings, the program was broadcast by Mutual until December 26, 1954.

Welles did not speak the signature line, "Who knows what evil lurks in the hearts of men?" Instead, Readick did, using a water glass next to his mouth for the echo effect. The famous catchphrase was accompanied by the strains of an excerpt from Opus 31 of the Camille Saint-Saëns classical composition, Le Rouet d'Omphale.

In the debut episode "The Death House Rescue," Cranston explains he spent years studying in London, Paris, Vienna, Egypt, China, and India, learning different fields of science as well as "the old mysteries that modern science has not yet rediscovered, the natural magic that modern psychology is beginning to understand." He states his hypnotic and seemingly telepathic abilities are not magic but based on scientific secrets most of the world has forgotten or does not yet understand. In "The Temple Bells of Neban" in 1937, he specifies that a Yogi priest, "Keeper of the Temple of Cobras" in Delhi, taught him how to be invisible by "clouding" peoples' minds. He indicates in "The Death House Rescue" that he always intended to use his acquired knowledge to secretly fight evil forces that evaded conventional authorities. In the same episode, when his companion Margo Lane suggests he work openly with the police, Cranston implies the police and general public would not understand or approve of his strange methods and abilities, concluding he is only effective by working outside of the law. The radio version of The Shadow is less ruthless than his pulp counterpart, preferring to capture his foes more often than gun them down. He sometimes openly shows compassion for his enemies, even at time criticizing society for creating circumstances that lead to certain crimes and cause some people to lose hope and support.

After Welles departed the show in 1938, Bill Johnstone was chosen to replace him and voiced the character for five seasons. Following Johnstone's departure, The Shadow was portrayed by such actors as Bret Morrison (the longest tenure, with 10 years total in two separate runs), John Archer, and Steven Courtleigh (the actors were rarely credited).

The Shadow also inspired another radio hit, The Whistler, with a similarly mysterious narrator.

In "The Talking Magpies" (1946), the cartoon film debut of the precursors who would become Heckle and Jeckle, The Shadow radio program is referenced in a scene.

In 1946, an Australian version of the series was produced starring actor Lloyd Lamble.

=== Margo Lane ===
The radio drama also introduced Margo Lane (played by Agnes Moorehead, among others) as Cranston's love interest, crime-solving partner, and the only person who knows his identity as The Shadow. Described as Cranston's "friend and companion" in many episodes, the exact nature of their relationship was not explicitly stated, but Margo mentions in the first episode that she loves him and hopes he will retire The Shadow identity and operate without secrecy if the police really need his help. Four years after the radio show began, the character was introduced into the pulp novels as one of The Shadow's agents. Her sudden, unexplained appearance in the pulps annoyed readers and generated a flurry of hate mail printed on The Shadow Magazine's letters page.

In early scripts of the radio drama, the character's name was spelled "Margot." The name itself was originally inspired by Margot Stevenson, the Broadway ingénue who would later be chosen to voice Lane opposite Welles's The Shadow during "the 1938 Goodrich summer season of the radio drama." In the 1994 film in which Penelope Ann Miller played the character, Margo is portrayed as telepathic, making her aware of and able to counter The Shadow's mental abilities.

=== Radio drama LPs and CDs ===
In 1968, Metro Record's "Leo the Lion" label released an LP titled The Official Adventures of The Shadow (CH-1048) with two original 15-minute radio-style productions written by John Fleming: "The Computer Calculates, but The Shadow Knows" and "Air Freight Fracas." Bret Morrison, Grace Matthews, and Santos Ortega reprised their roles as Cranston/The Shadow, Margo Lane, and Commissioner Weston. Ken Roberts also returned as the announcer.

Throughout the 1970s, 1980s, and 1990s, dozens of LPs appeared in print from other record labels featuring recordings taken from the original broadcast Shadow radio show dramas. With the advent of the compact disc, more of the radio shows were commercially released.

== Comic strip ==
Walter Gibson's and Vernon Greene's The Shadow (August 12, 1940).

The Shadow has been adapted for comics a number of times during his long history; his first was on June 17, 1940, as a syndicated daily newspaper comic strip offered through the Ledger Syndicate. The strip's story continuity was written by Walter B. Gibson, with plot lines adapted from the Shadow pulps, and the strip was illustrated by Vernon Greene.

The comic strip, which ran until June 20, 1942, comprised 14 stories, the last of which was left uncompleted when the strip was canceled:

1. Mystery of the Sealed Box (June 17 – Aug 10, 1940)
2. The Shadow in His Sanctum (Aug 12 – Sept 21, 1940)
3. The Shadow vs. Hoang Hu (Sept 23 – Nov 2, 1940)
4. The Shadow on Shark Island (Nov 4, 1940 – Jan 25, 1941)
5. The Shadow vs. the Bund (Jan 27 – April 19, 1941)
6. The Shadow vs. Shiwan Khan (April 21 – July 26, 1941)
7. The Darvin Fortune (July 28 – Oct 11, 1941)
8. The Adele Varne Mystery (Oct 13 – Nov 22, 1941)
9. The Shadow and Professor Scorpio (Nov 24 – Dec 13, 1941)
10. The Shadow and the Gray Ghost (Dec 15, 1941 – Jan 10, 1942)
11. The Star of Delhi (Jan 12 – Jan 31, 1942)
12. The Earthquake Machines (Feb 2 – March 28, 1942)
13. The Return of Althor (March 30 – May 23, 1942)
14. The Cliff Castle Mystery (May 25 – June 20, 1942)

The Shadow daily strip was collected decades later in two comic book series from two different publishers (see below), first in 1988 and then again in 1999.

== Comic books ==
=== Bibliography ===
==== Street & Smith ====
- Shadow Comics v1, 1 – v9, 5, March 1940 – September 1949 (101 issues)

==== Archie Comics ====
- The Shadow, 1–8, August 1964 – September 1965

==== DC Comics ====
- The Shadow, 1–12, November 1973 – September 1975
- Batman, #253, #259 (crossover appearances published in 1973 and 1974, respectively)
- The Shadow: Blood and Judgment, 1–4, May–August 1986
- The Shadow, 1–19, 2 annuals, August 1987 – January 1989
- The Private Files of the Shadow, 1989 (graphic collection reprinting the first six issues of the 1973 series, with one new story)
- The Shadow Strikes!, 1–31, 1 annual, September 1989 – May 1992
- Batman and The Shadow: The Murder Geniuses, 1–6, 2017 (co-published with Dynamite Entertainment)

==== Marvel Comics ====
- The Shadow: Hitler's Astrologer (original graphic novel, 1988)

==== Dark Horse Comics ====
- The Shadow: In the Coils of Leviathan, 1–4, 1993
- The Shadow Movie Adaptation, 1–2, 1994, Dark Horse Comics (based on the feature film)
- The Shadow: Hell's Heat Wave, 1–3, 1995, Dark Horse Comics
- The Shadow and Doc Savage, 1–2, 1995, Dark Horse Comics (crossover with Doc Savage)
- Ghost & The Shadow one-shot, 1995 (crossover with Ghost)
- Grendel versus The Shadow, 1-3, 2014 (crossover with Grendel, co-published with Dynamite Entertainment)

==== Dynamite Entertainment ====
- Altered States: The Shadow, one-shot, 2015
- The Shadow, 1–25, 0, two annuals, two specials, 2012–2015
- The Shadow/Green Hornet: Dark Nights, 5 issues, 2013-2015 (crossover with the Green Hornet)
- Masks, 1-8, 2012-2013 (featuring the Shadow with the Green Hornet, the Spider and other comic book and pulp characeers)
- The Shadow Now, 1–6, 2013
- The Shadow: Year One, 1–10, 2013–2014
- The Shadow, 1–5, 2015
- The Shadow: Midnight In Moscow, 2014
- Justice, Inc. 1-6 (2014-5) (the Shadow with Doc Savage and the Avenger)
- The Shadow, 1–6, 2016
- The Shadow/Batman, 1–6, 2017-8 (Batman crossover co-published with DC Comics)
- The Shadow: The Death of Margo Lane, 1–6, 2016
- The Shadow Over Innsmouth (sequel to the H.P. Lovecraft novella of the same name, 2014
- The Twilight Zone: The Shadow, 1-4, 2016 (miniseries featuring a The Twilight Zone style scenario)

=== History ===
==== 1940s-1960s ====
To both cross-promote The Shadow and attract a younger audience to its other pulp magazines, Street & Smith published 101 issues of the comic book Shadow Comics from Vol. 1, #1 – Vol. 9, #5 (March 1940 – Sept. 1949). A Shadow story led off each issue, with the remainder of the stories being strips based on other Street & Smith pulp heroes.

In Mad #4 (April–May 1953), The Shadow was spoofed by Harvey Kurtzman and Will Elder with a character called "The Shadow'" (with an apostrophe), which is short for "Lamont Shadowskeedeeboomboom". This story was reprinted in The Brothers Mad (ibooks, New York, 2002, ISBN 0-7434-4482-5). The character returned in Mad #14 (August 1954) to guest-star in "Manduck the Magician", a spoof by Harvey Kurtzman and Will Elder of the Mandrake the Magician comic strip. This story was reprinted in Mad Strikes Back! (ibooks, New York, 2002, ISBN 0-7434-4478-7).

During the superhero revival of the 1960s, Archie Comics published an eight-issue series, The Shadow (Aug. 1964 – Sept. 1965), under the company's Mighty Comics imprint. In the first issue, The Shadow was loosely based on the radio version, but with blond hair. In issue #2 (Sept. 1964), the character changed into a campy, heavily muscled superhero in a green and blue costume by writer Robert Bernstein and artist John Rosenberger. Later issues of this eight-issue series were written by Superman co-creator Jerry Siegel. The change was not well received. "Totally at odds with everything that personified the classic Shadow," American Comic Book Chronicles says, "Archie's incarnation is still regarded in many quarters as one of the greatest comic book misfires of the 1960s."

==== 1970s ====
Starting in 1973, DC Comics published an "atmospheric interpretation" of the character by writer Dennis O'Neil and artist Michael Kaluta in a 12-issue series (Nov. 1973 – Sept. 1975) attempting to be faithful to both the pulp-magazine character and radio-drama character. Kaluta drew issues 1–4 and 6 and was followed by Frank Robbins and then E. R. Cruz. Fellow pulp fiction hero the Avenger guest-starred in issue #11. The Shadow also appeared in DC's Batman #253 (Nov. 1973), in which Batman teams with an aging Shadow and calls the famous crime fighter his "biggest inspiration." In Batman #259 (Nov.–Dec. 1974), Batman again meets The Shadow, and we learn that, in the past, The Shadow had saved Bruce Wayne's life when the latter was a boy and that The Shadow knows Batman's secret identity (he assures Batman, however, that his secret is safe with him). The Shadow is also referenced in DC's Detective Comics #446 (1975), page 4, panel 2: Batman, out of costume and in disguise as an older night janitor, makes a crime fighting acknowledgement, in a thought balloon, to the Shadow.

==== 1980s ====
In 1986, another DC adaptation was developed by Howard Chaykin. This four-issue miniseries, The Shadow: Blood and Judgement, brought The Shadow to modern-day New York. While initially successful, this version proved unpopular with some traditional Shadow fans because it depicted The Shadow using two Uzi submachine guns, as well as featuring a strong strain of black comedy and extreme violence throughout.

The Shadow, set in the then-current day, was continued in 1987 as a monthly DC comics series by writer Andy Helfer (editor of the miniseries); it was drawn primarily by artists Bill Sienkiewicz (issues 1–6) and Kyle Baker (issues 8–19 and the second of two Shadow Annuals, the first having been drawn by Joe Orlando).

In 1988, O'Neil and Kaluta, with inker Russ Heath, returned to The Shadow with the Marvel Comics graphic novel The Shadow: Hitler's Astrologer, set during World War II. This one-shot appeared in both hardcover and trade paperback editions.

The Vernon Greene/Walter Gibson Shadow newspaper comic strip from the early 1940s was collected by Malibu Graphics (Malibu Comics) under its Eternity Comics imprint, beginning with the first issue of Crime Classics dated July 1988. Each cover was illustrated by Greene and colored by one of Eternity's colorists. A total of 13 issues appeared featuring just the black-and-white daily until the final issue, dated November 1989. Some of the Shadow storylines were contained in one issue, while others were continued over into the next. When a Shadow story ended, another tale would begin in the same issue. This back-to-back format continued until the final issue (#13).

Crime Classics 1 and 2, "Riddle of the Sealed Box"; 2 and 3, "Mystery of the Sleeping Gas"; 3 and 4, "The Shadow vs. Hoang Hu"; 4, 5 and 6, "Danger on Shark Island"; 6, 7 and 8, "The Shadow vs. the Bund"; 8, 9 and 10, "The Shadow vs. Shiwan Khan"; 10, 11 and 12, "The Shadow vs. the Swindlers"; 12 and 13, "The Shadow and the Adele Varne Mystery"; 13, "Robberies at Lake Calada".

Dave Stevens' nostalgic comics series The Rocketeer contains a number of pop culture references to the 1930s. Various characters from the Shadow pulps make appearances in the storyline published in the Rocketeer Adventure Magazine, including The Shadow's famous alter ego Lamont Cranston. Two issues were published by Comico in 1988 and 1989, but the third and final installment did not appear until years later, finally appearing in 1995 from Dark Horse Comics. All three issues were then collected by Dark Horse into a slick trade paperback titled The Rocketeer: Cliff's New York Adventure (ISBN 1-56971-092-9).

In 1989, DC released a hardcover graphic collection reprinting five issues (#1–4 and 6 by Dennis O'Neil and Michael Kaluta) of their 1970s series as The Private Files of The Shadow. The volume also featured "In the Toils of Wing Fat", a new Shadow adventure drawn by Kaluta.

==== 1990s ====
From 1989 to 1992, DC published a new Shadow comic book series, The Shadow Strikes!, written by Gerard Jones and Eduardo Barreto. This series was set in the 1930s and returned The Shadow to his pulp origins. During its run, it featured The Shadow's first-ever team-up with Doc Savage, another popular hero of the pulp magazine era. The two characters appeared together in a four-issue story that crossed back and forth between each character's DC comic book series. The Shadow Strikes often led The Shadow into encounters with well-known celebrities of the 1930s, such as Albert Einstein, Amelia Earhart, Charles Lindbergh, union organizer John L. Lewis, and Chicago gangsters Frank Nitti and Jake Guzik. In issue #7, The Shadow meets a radio announcer named Grover Mills, a character based on the young Orson Welles, who has been impersonating The Shadow on the radio. The character's name is taken from Grover's Mill, New Jersey, the name of the small town where the Martians land in Welles's 1938 radio broadcast of The War of the Worlds. When Shadow rights holder Condé Nast increased its licensing fee, DC concluded the series after 31 issues and one Annual; it became the longest-running Shadow comic book series since Street & Smith's original 1940s series.

During the early-to-mid-1990s, Dark Horse Comics acquired the rights to The Shadow from Condé Nast. It published the Shadow miniseries The Shadow: In the Coils of Leviathan (four issues) in 1993, and The Shadow: Hell's Heat Wave (three issues) in 1995. In the Coils of Leviathan was later collected by Dark Horse in 1994 as a trade paperback. Both series were written by Joel Goss and Michael Kaluta and drawn by Gary Gianni. A one-shot issue, The Shadow and the Mysterious Three, was published by Dark Horse in 1994, again written by Joel Goss and Michael Kaluta, with Stan Manoukian and Vince Roucher taking over the illustration duties but working from Kaluta's layouts. A comics adaptation of the 1994 film The Shadow was published in two issues by Dark Horse as part of the movie's merchandising campaign. The script was by Goss and Kaluta and drawn by Kaluta. It was collected and published in England by Boxtree as a graphic novel tie-in for the film's British release. Emulating DC's earlier team-up, Dark Horse also published a two-issue miniseries in 1995 called The Shadow and Doc Savage: The Case of the Shrieking Skeletons. It was written by Steve Vance and illustrated by Manoukian and Roucher. Both issues' covers were drawn by Rocketeer creator Dave Stevens. A final Dark Horse Shadow team-up was published in 1995: another one-shot issue, Ghost and The Shadow, written by Doug Moench, pencilled by H. M. Baker, and inked by Bernard Kolle. It was set in modern times.

The Shadow made an uncredited cameo in issue #2 of DC's 1996 four-issue miniseries Kingdom Come, re-released as a trade paperback in 1997. The Shadow appears in the nightclub scene standing in the background next to the Question and Rorschach.

The early 1940s Shadow newspaper daily strip was reprinted by Avalon Communications under its ACG Classix imprint. The Shadow daily began appearing in the first issue of Pulp Action comics. It carried no monthly date or issue number on the cover, only a 1999 copyright and a Pulp Action #1 notation at the bottom of the inside cover. Each issue's cover is a colorized panel blow-up, taken from one of the reprinted strips. The eighth issue uses for its cover a Shadow serial black-and-white film still, with several hand-drawn alterations. The first issue of Pulp Action is devoted entirely to reprinting the Shadow daily, but subsequent issues began offering back-up stories not involving The Shadow in every issue. These Shadow strip reprints stopped with Pulp Action's eighth issue, before the story was complete. Here are the strip's reprinted storylines (the last issue carries a 2000 copyright date):

Pulp Action' 1, "Riddle of the Sealed Box"; 2, "Mystery of the Sleeping Gas"; 3 and 4, "The Shadow vs. the Swindlers"; 5 and 6, "The Shadow and the Adele Varne Mystery"; 7 and 8, "The Shadow and the Darvin Fortune".

==== 21st century ====
In August 2011, Dynamite licensed The Shadow from Condé Nast for an ongoing comic book series and several miniseries. Its first on-going series was written by Garth Ennis and illustrated by Aaron Campbell; it debuted on April 19, 2012. This series ran for 26 issues; the regular series ended in May 2014, but a prologue issue #0 was published in July 2014. Dynamite followed with the release of an eight-issue miniseries, Masks, teaming the 1930s Shadow with Dynamite's other pulp hero comic book adaptations, the Spider, the Green Hornet and Kato, and a 1930s Zorro, plus four other heroes of the pulp era from Dynamite's comics lineup. Dynamite offered a 10-issue Shadow miniseries, The Shadow: Year One, followed by the team-up five-issue miniseries, The Shadow/Green Hornet: Dark Nights, and a Shadow six-issue miniseries set in the modern era, The Shadow: Now. In August 2015, Dynamite Entertainment launched volume 2 of The Shadow, a new ongoing series written by Cullen Bunn and drawn by Giovanni Timpano.

== Films ==
The Shadow character has been adapted for film shorts and films.

=== Shadow film shorts (1931–1932) ===
In 1931 and 1932, Bryan Foy Productions created and Universal Pictures distributed a series of six film shorts based on the popular Detective Story Hour radio program, narrated by The Shadow. The shorts featured the voice of Frank Readick Jr., who portrayed The Shadow on the radio program. The six films are: A Burglar to the Rescue (© July 22, 1931), Trapped (© Sep. 21, 1931), Sealed Lips (© Oct. 30, 1931), House of Mystery (© Dec. 11, 1931), The Red Shadow (© Jan. 12, 1932), and The Circus Show-Up (© Jan. 27, 1932).

=== The Shadow Strikes (1937) ===
The film The Shadow Strikes was released in 1937, starring Rod La Rocque in the title role. Lamont Granston (as his name was spelled in both opening credits and a newspaper article) assumes the secret identity of "The Shadow" in order to thwart an attempted robbery at an attorney's office. Both The Shadow Strikes (1937) and its sequel, International Crime (1938), were released by Grand National Pictures.

=== International Crime (1938) ===
La Rocque returned the following year in International Crime. In this version, reporter Lamont Cranston (despite being spelled Granston in the previous film) is an amateur criminologist and detective who uses the name of "The Shadow" as a radio gimmick. Thomas Jackson portrayed Police Commissioner Weston, and Astrid Allwyn was cast as Phoebe Lane, Cranston's assistant.

=== The Shadow (1940) ===
The Shadow, a 15-chapter movie serial, produced by Columbia Pictures and starring Victor Jory, premiered in theaters in 1940. The serial's villain, The Black Tiger, is a criminal mastermind who sabotages rail lines and factories across the United States. Lamont Cranston must become his shadowy alter ego in order to unmask the criminal and halt his fiendish crime spree. As The Shadow, Jory wears an all-black suit and cloak, as well as a black bandana that helps conceal his facial features.

=== The Shadow Returns, Behind the Mask, and Missing Lady (1946) ===
Low-budget motion picture studio Monogram Pictures produced a trio of quickie Shadow B-movie features in 1946 starring Kane Richmond: The Shadow Returns (January 31, 1946), Behind the Mask (April 1, 1946) and The Missing Lady (July 20, 1946). Richmond's Shadow wore all black, including a trench coat, a wide-brimmed fedora, and a full face-mask similar to the type worn by movie serial hero The Masked Marvel, instead of the character's signature black cape with red lining and red scarf.

=== Invisible Avenger (1958) ===
Episodes of a television pilot shot in 1957 were edited into the 1958 theatrical feature Invisible Avenger, rereleased in 1962 as Bourbon Street Shadows.

=== The Shadow (1994) ===
Alec Baldwin as the eponymous character in the 1994 film The Shadow.

In 1994, the character was adapted once again into a feature film, The Shadow, starring Alec Baldwin as Lamont Cranston and Penelope Ann Miller as Margo Lane, with John Lone playing the recurring Asian villain from the pulp series Shiwan Khan, who claims to be a direct descendant of Genghis Khan. As the film opens, Cranston has become the evil and corrupt Yin-Ko (literally "Dark Eagle"), a brutal warlord and opium smuggler in early 1930s Tibet. Yin-Ko is kidnapped by agents of the mysterious holy man Tulku, who knows the warlord is really Lamont Cranston of New York. He says he is determined to reform the man, that since Cranston knows the evil that lurks in his own heart he will be effective in knowing and fighting such evil in other men, and will learn how to tap into his latent psychic power. Resistant at first, Cranston accepts that he is now under the Tulku's control. Over time, he reforms and learns how to read thoughts, as well as how to "cloud men's minds" to alter their perception and make himself invisible. Cranston eventually returns to his native New York City and takes up the guise of the mysterious crime fighter "The Shadow," in payment to humanity for his past evil misdeeds: "Who knows what evil lurks in the hearts of men? The Shadow knows ..."

The Shadow has a network of agents, each of whom now wears a ring similar to his own, and is then joined by Margo Lane, a socialite born with the gift of telepathy herself who quickly discovers Cranston's identity. In the film, the evil Shiwan Khan is an admirer of Ying-Ko who later also becomes a student of the Tulku, learning the same powers of illusion and telepathy but never reforming or regretting his murderous ways. He seeks to finish his ancestor's legacy of conquering the world by first destroying New York City, using a newly developed atomic bomb as a show of his power. Khan nearly succeeds, but is thwarted by The Shadow. In a final psychic duel, the hero telekinetically hurls a shattered piece of mirror directly into the villain's forehead, instantly rendering him unconscious. Shiwan Khan is not killed and wakes up in an unidentified asylum where he is now under the care of a doctor who is secretly one of The Shadow's agents. Due to his head injury, surgery was performed on his frontal lobe, removing his telepathic powers and forcing him to remain imprisoned in the asylum.

The film combines elements from The Shadow pulp novels and comic books with the aforementioned ability to cloud minds described only on the radio show. In the film Alec Baldwin, as The Shadow, wears a black cloak and a long red scarf that covers his mouth and chin; he also wears a black, double-breasted trench coat and a wide-brimmed, black slouch hat. Contrarily to pulp novels, he is armed with a pair of modified M1911 .45-caliber semi-automatic pistols that for the film have longer barrels, are nickel plated, and have ivory grips. In reality, the prop guns were modified LAR Grizzly Win Mags nicknamed "Silver Heat." The film also displays a first: Cranston's ability to conjure the illusion of a false face whenever he is in his guise as The Shadow, giving him an appearance similar to the character's physical portrayal in the pulp magazines and comics.

The film was financially and critically unsuccessful, but it has developed a modest, devoted cult following over the years.

=== Unmade Sam Raimi Shadow feature film ===
On December 11, 2006, the website SuperHero Hype reported that director Sam Raimi and Michael Uslan would co-produce a new Shadow film for Columbia Pictures. It was rumored to also be a film involving several Street and Smith pulp heroes, including The Shadow, the Avenger, and Doc Savage. This screenplay was supposedly written by Siavash Farahani.

On October 16, 2007, Raimi stated, "I don't have any news on The Shadow at this time, except that the company that I have with Josh Donen, my producing partner, we've got the rights to The Shadow. I love the character very much and we're trying to work on a story that'll do justice to the character".

On August 23, 2012, the website ShadowFan reported that during a Q&A session at the 2012 San Diego Comic-Con, director Sam Raimi, when asked about the status of his Shadow film project, stated they had not been able to develop a good script and the film would not be produced as planned.

== Game adaptations ==
Ocean Software developed a video game version of The Shadow to tie in with the 1994 film. The game was supposed to be published on the Super Nintendo Entertainment System, but after the low box office gross of the film, the game was never released despite being completed. Since then, a ROM of the game has been leaked online.

Bally released a pinball machine based on The Shadow in 1994. The game was designed by Brian Eddy, and maintains modern popularity due to its clever use of mechanical features like the Phurba diverters, satisfying shot design, and unique upper playfield feature.

There is also a Tiger handheld game as well.

== Television ==
Two attempts were made to adapt the character to television. The first, in 1954, was titled The Shadow and starred Tom Helmore as Lamont Cranston.

The second attempt in 1958 was titled The Invisible Avenger; it never aired. The two episodes produced were compiled into a theatrical film and released with the same title. It was re-released with additional footage in 1962 as Bourbon Street Shadows. Starring Richard Derr as The Shadow, the film depicts Lamont Cranston investigating the murder of a New Orleans bandleader. The film is notable as the second directorial effort of James Wong Howe, who directed only one of the two unaired episodes.

== Influence on superheroes and other media ==
When Bob Kane and Bill Finger first developed Batman, they patterned the character after pulp mystery men such as The Shadow. Finger then used "Partners of Peril" – a Shadow pulp written by Theodore Tinsley – as the basis for Batman's debut story, "The Case of the Chemical Syndicate". Finger later publicly acknowledged that "my first Batman script was a takeoff on a Shadow story" and that "Batman was originally written in the style of the pulps." This influence was further evident with Batman showing little remorse over killing or maiming criminals and not above using firearms. Decades later, noted comic book writer Dennis O'Neil would have Batman and The Shadow meet in Batman #253 (November 1973) and Batman #259 (December 1974) to solve crimes. In the former, Batman acknowledged that The Shadow was his biggest influence and in the latter, The Shadow reveals to Batman that he knows his true identity of Bruce Wayne but assures him that his secret is safe with him.

Alan Moore has credited The Shadow as one of the key influences for the creation of V, the title character in his DC Comics miniseries V for Vendetta, which later became a Warner Bros. feature film released in 2006.

The Shadow is also one of the inspirations for Disney's 1991–1992 cartoon series Darkwing Duck.

The 2015 video game Fallout 4 includes a quest series centered on a character called "the Silver Shroud," a crime-fighting detective from old-world radio shows.

The Lamont Cranston Band takes its name from The Shadow's alter ego.
