= The Living Shadow =

Pulp novel written by Walter B. Gibson

Cover to The Living Shadow from The Shadow Magazine #1, April 1931. Art by Modest Stein.

The Living Shadow is the first pulp novel to feature The Shadow. Written by Walter B. Gibson, it was submitted for publication as Murder in the Next Room on January 23, 1931, and published as The Living Shadow in the April 1, 1931 issue of The Shadow Magazine. This story introduces the literary version, as opposed to the radio version, of The Shadow.

== Publishing history ==
Because of this story's significance as the first Shadow story, it has been reprinted more times than any other Shadow tale; the reprintings include:

- Street and Smith, The Ideal Library hardcover, 1931
- The Shadow Magazine 1942 Annual
- Bantam Books mass-market paperback, 1969
- Pyramid Books mass-market paperback, 1974
- Jove Books mass-market paperback, 1977
- Amazon kindle edition ebook, 2021

== Summary ==
- Shadow Disguises: himself, Fritz the janitor, various street people in Chinatown, Ling Chow, English Johnny.
- Shadow Agents: Harry Vincent, Claude Fellows.
- Villains: Ezekiel Bingham, Steve Cronin, Diamond Bert Farwell.
- Other Characters: Joe Cardona.
- Plot: Harry Vincent, saved from suicide by The Shadow, is recruited to watch Scanlon, courier for Wang Foo, the Chinatown mastermind. Cronin murders Scanlon, but fails to find the metal Chinese disk Scanlon uses as an identifier. Vincent finds the disk, poses as the courier, is exposed, captured, tortured, and saved by The Shadow. Millionaire Geoffrey Laidlow is killed for his hidden jewels; the rest of the story involves searching for Laidlow's killer, and the killer searching for the jewels, to be fenced with the Chinatown mastermind. In the end, the criminal mastermind's lawyer Ezekiel Bingham, is free and unpunished. Diamond Bert Farwell, exposed as Wang Foo, goes to jail.

== Reception ==
The magazine containing the novel sold out after hitting the newsstands. When the second and third novels also almost sold out, it resulted in the magazine becoming monthly rather than quarterly.

== Preservation ==
Under the Copyright Term Extension Act, the first few stories of the magazine will enter the public domain in 2027.

== Notes ==
- Firsts: The Shadow, agents Harry Vincent and Claude Fellows, Detective Joe Cardona, gunman Steve Cronin.
- Firsts: The Shadow’s Fritz the janitor identity, The Shadow as a master of disguise.
- Firsts: The Shadow's cloak and slouch hat, sanctum, messages written in disappearing blue ink, girasol ring, mysterious laugh, verbal messages with emphasized words, organizing written clues, Thursday radio program (Street and Smith's Detective Story Hour on CBS and narrated at that time by "The Shadow").
- Diamond Bert Farwell returns in "The Chinese Disks" (Nov 1, 1934).
- The cover for this issue of the pulp magazine features a frightened Chinese man. The cover image was originally published on the October 1, 1919 issue of the pulp The Thrill Book. Gibson was asked to work a Chinatown angle into The Living Shadow so the cover could be used on the inaugural issue of The Shadow Magazine. The suggestion proved to be beneficial to the Shadow mythology; many Shadow stories used a Chinatown setting.
