= Maxwell Grant =

Pen name used by authors of "The Shadow"

Maxwell Grant was a pen name used by the authors of The Shadow pulp magazine stories from the 1930s to 1960s.

Street & Smith, the publishers of The Shadow, hired author Walter B. Gibson to create and write the series based on popular interest in the character who was first used as a radio narrator. However, Gibson was asked to use a pen name. The pen name was used primarily so numerous authors could write the stories without confusing readers. Another factor was how Gibson, also a nonfiction writer, wanted to use a pen name for his fiction. He adopted the pen name Maxwell Grant, taking the name from two stage magic dealers he knew: Maxwell Holden and U.F. Grant.

Gibson wrote the vast majority of Shadow stories, usually two short novels per month for The Shadow magazine. Four authors besides Gibson have used the Maxwell Grant pen name: Theodore Tinsley, who wrote 27 Shadow stories between 1936 and 1943; Lester Dent, who wrote one story, The Golden Vulture, in 1938; Bruce Elliott, who wrote 15 Shadow stories between 1946 and 1948; and Dennis Lynds, who wrote nine Shadow paperback novels between 1964 and 1967.

The comic book series The Shadow: Year One, published by Dynamite Entertainment, features a character by the name of "Maxwell Grant". The character is a journalist, who uncovers the identity of the Shadow. However, rather than exposing him, Grant offers to chronicle his adventures.
