= Bruce Elliott (writer) =

American writer (1914–1973)

Bruce Walter Gardner Lively Stacy Elliott (May 30, 1914 – March 21, 1973) was an American writer of mystery fiction, science fiction, and television scripts. He was also a magician who wrote several books on magic. Eliott co-founded the magicians' magazine Phoenix with Walter B. Gibson, as assistant editor, later editor.

Elliott's 15 stories in The Shadow magazine between 1946 and 1948 (issues #306-320) include three stories in which the Shadow does not appear in his costumed identity.

Elliott contributed material to The Magazine of Fantasy & Science Fiction, including the acclaimed reverse-werewolf story "Wolves Don't Cry" (1954) and a comic fantasy about Satan, "The Devil Was Sick".

In November 1972, Elliott was hit by a taxi cab driver, lapsed into a coma, and died four months later on March 21, 1973. He was 58 years old.

== Biblio ==
=== Novels ===
- You’ll Die Laughing (1945)
- The Planet of Shame (1961)
- Asylum Earth (1968)
- The Rivet in Grandfather's Neck (1970)

=== Short Fiction ===
- "Jungle Jazz" (1944)
- "They're Hustling You" (1948)
- "Fearsome Fable" (1951)
- "The Devil Was Sick" (1951)
- The Battle of the S...s (1952)
- "Asylum Earth" (1952)
- The Last Magician (1953)
- "So Sweet As Magic ..." (1953)
- The Man Next Door (1953)
- "Wolves Don't Cry" (1954)
