= Theodore Tinsley =

American writer

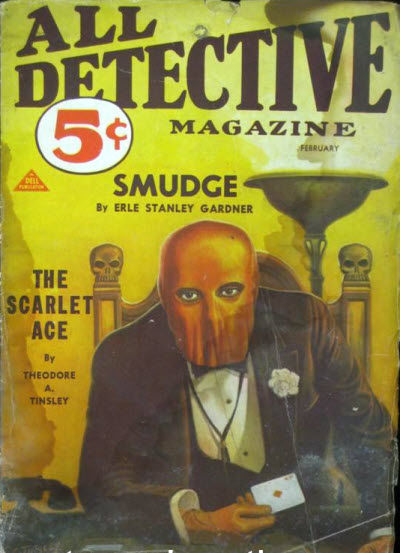
Tinsley's stories about The Scarlet Ace were published in All Detective Magazine in the early 1930s

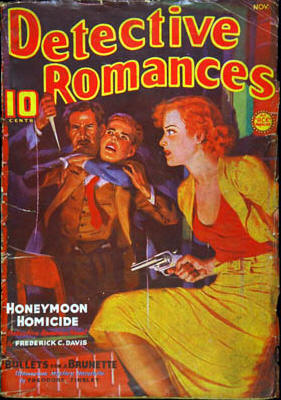
Tinsley's "Bullets for a Brunette" was cover-featured on the November 1936 issue of Detective Romances

Theodore A. Tinsley (October 27, 1894 – March 3, 1979) was an American writer who primarily wrote mystery stories. Tinsley wrote 27 stories featuring The Shadow for The Shadow Magazine pulp magazine. He also created Carrie Cashin, one of the first female detectives in pulp fiction, who appeared in Street & Smith's Crimebuster pulp magazine. An early series he wrote is the "Amusement Inc./Scarlet Ace" series that ran over 4 different pulp magazines in the 1930s.

== Early life ==
Theodore Adrian Tinsley was born on October 27, 1894, in New York City, the eldest of six children of Francis B. Tinsley, the owner of a coal yard, by his wife Gertrude (Theban) Tinsley. Tinsley graduated from City College of New York in 1916, and worked as a school teacher and insurance agent before fighting in World War I as a member of an anti-aircraft machine gun battery. He was a veteran of the battle of Meuse-Argonne.

== Stories ==
Tinsley's Shadow stories are listed chronologically here:

== Later life ==
On February 5, 1935, Theodore Tinsley married May Ethel White. In 1989, their daughter Dr. Adrian Tinsley would be named president of Fitchburg State University.

During World War II, Tinsley moved to Washington, D.C., where he worked in the Writer's Division of the Office of War Information. After the war's end, he worked in public relations for the Veterans Administration until 1960, when he retired to Auburn, Alabama, where he spent the rest of his life. Tinsley died on March 3, 1979, at age 84.
