= The Spider (magazine) =

American pulp crime fiction magazine

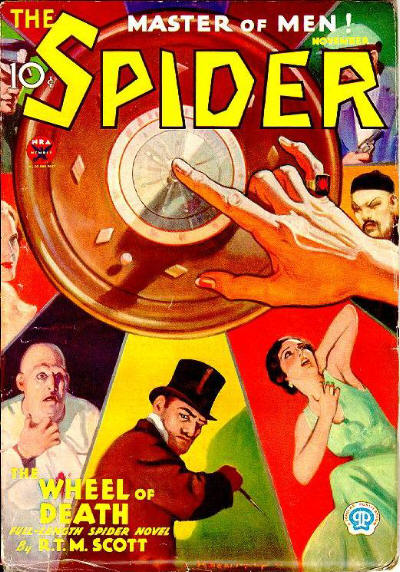
- Cover of the second issue, dated November 1933, by John Newton Howitt
- Publisher: Popular Publications
- First issue: October 1933; 91 years ago
- Final issue: December 1943; 81 years ago
- Country: United States

The Spider was an American pulp magazine published by Popular Publications from 1933 to 1943. Every issue included a lead novel featuring the Spider, a heroic crime-fighter. The magazine was intended as a rival to Street & Smith's The Shadow and Standard Magazine's The Phantom Detective, which also featured crime-fighting heroes. The novels in the first two issues were written by R. T. M. Scott; thereafter every lead novel was credited to "Grant Stockbridge", a house name. Norvell Page, a prolific pulp author, wrote most of these; almost all the rest were written by Emile Tepperman and A. H. Bittner. The novel in the final issue was written by Prentice Winchell.

The Spider's secret identity was Richard Wentworth, a rich New Yorker. Unlike some contemporary pulp heroes, the Spider was willing to kill criminals, and when he did so he left a red spider inked on his victims. Page in particular wrote stories with violent storylines, often with science fiction plot devices. Bittner had written for Popular's horror magazines, Terror Tales and Horror Stories, and his stories included horror tropes such as criminals planning to sell human flesh as meat. Continuity from novel to novel was often disregarded: New York would be resurrected each issue from whatever disaster had afflicted it the previous month, and characters killed in one issue would reappear unscathed in later issues.

As well as the lead novel, each issue featured short stories, also in the crime fiction genre. Occasionally these included elements of horror fiction, but any apparently supernatural phenomena were always explained away by the end of the story. Authors of these stories included Tepperman, Arthur Leo Zagat, and Frank Gruber. Most of the cover art was painted by John Newton Howitt and (for the last few years of the magazine's run) by Rafael de Soto.

The magazine was discontinued in 1943 because of the shortage of paper caused by World War II. The last issue was dated December 1943. The manuscript of an unpublished Spider novel by Donald G. Cormack was discovered in 1978 and published in 1979 as Legend in Blue Steel.

== Publication history ==
In 1931, Street & Smith launched The Shadow, the first of the hero pulps, with a novel in each issue about a single character. It was an immediate success, and Standard Magazines soon launched The Phantom Detective in imitation of The Shadow. Henry Steeger, the owner of Popular Publications, another pulp publisher, decided to launch two hero pulps in response. One was G-8 and His Battle Aces, an air-war pulp, and the other was The Spider. Steeger chose the title because of a large spider he saw one day while playing tennis.

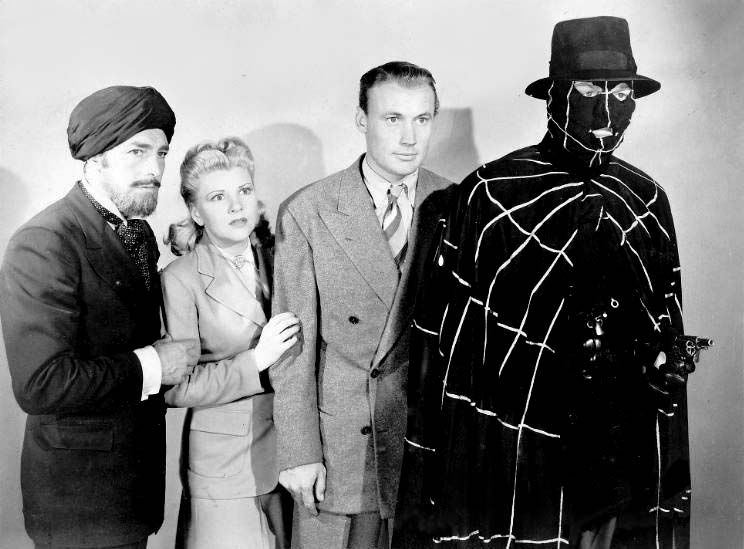
Publicity still for The Spider Returns, the second of the two film serials made featuring the Spider. Warren Hull played the lead character.

Lead characters in 1920s mystery stories usually shot to wound rather than to kill their antagonists. This began to change towards the end of the decade. Dime Detective Magazine, a successful Popular title, had shown Steeger that violence in mystery fiction sold well, and Steeger decided that the Spider would kill criminals without hesitation. Steeger turned the magazine over to Rogers Terrill, one of Popular's editors, to launch, and Terrill chose R. T. M. Scott to write the first lead novel. Scott was a Canadian pulp writer, well known for his stories about Aurelius Smith, known as Secret Service Smith. Scott's name on the cover of the magazine would have attracted readers, but Terrill likely intended from the start that other writers would take over writing the lead novel—Scott wrote too slowly to be able to turn out a novel each month, as a successful magazine would require. Scott's son, also known as R. T. M. Scott, wrote mystery fiction and was working at Popular at the time. It is possible that one of the first two novels, both of which were credited to Scott, was written partly or wholly by his son.

The first issue was dated October 1933, and carried a lead novel by Scott, The Spider Strikes. Thereafter every novel was credited to Grant Stockbridge, a house name of Popular's. Norvell Page took over the lead novels from the third issue until October 1936; Steeger chose him because he knew Page was capable of working at high speed, and in fact Page wrote 40,000 to 60,000 words each month in addition to the 60,000-word novel he turned in for The Spider. (Note: Sampson cites this information to an article by Robert Weinberg. Elsewhere Sampson says Page's novels averaged 45,000 words until March 1936, and then dropped to about 35,000 words.) Page was initially paid $500 for each novel (equivalent to $12,100 in 2024), but this was soon increased to $600 and then $700.

Page was followed by Emile Tepperman, who wrote every lead novel from the November 1936 issue until June 1937. From July 1937, A. H. Bittner and Page shared the writing duties for the lead novel for two years, followed by Tepperman and Page until the end of 1940, after which Page took over until October 1943, the penultimate issue. Page took a job in the Writers' Division of the US Office of War Information in 1943, and Popular asked Prentice Winchell and Donald G. Cormack to submit Spider novels. Winchell's novel, When Satan Came to Town, appeared in the final issue, dated December 1943, after which Popular cancelled the magazine because of the paper shortages caused by World War II. Cormack's manuscript, Slaughter, Inc., was rediscovered in 1978 and published as a paperback in 1979, retitled Legend in Blue Steel.

== Contents ==
=== Lead novel writers ===
The first novel introduced Richard Wentworth, a rich New Yorker, the secret identity of the Spider, a crime-fighter. Wentworth's character was based on that of Scott's Secret Service Smith: like Smith, Wentworth had an Indian servant, though Wentworth's servant Ram Singh was "more ferocious" than Smith's assistant Langa Doon. There were other similarities between Smith and Wentworth: both were masters of disguise, both had gray-blue eyes, and both were close friends with a woman who shared their adventures, but never married them. Smith's love interest was his secretary, Bernice; Wentworth's was his friend Nita Van Sloan, who occasionally took on the identity of the Spider herself.

Other regular characters included Professor Brownlee and Police Commissioner Stanley Kirkpatrick. Wentworth had rescued Brownlee from blackmail in college by murdering the blackmailer; Brownlee had a laboratory in which he created mechanical devices such as specialized guns for Wentworth to use. Kirkpatrick was a friend of Wentworth's, but pursued the Spider for murder, unaware of Wentworth's double life. As a result Wentworth frequently found himself battling the police, but he rarely returned their fire—"only to make them jump", in the words of pulp historian Robert Sampson.

From a cunning artifice contrived at the bottom of his cigarette lighter, [Wentworth] withdrew a tiny seal and pressed it upon the forehead of the dead man. There, close to the small hole, was clearly depicted, in rich vermilion, the tiny outline of an ugly spider ...

— R. T. M. Scott, quoted in Robert Sampson's Spider

The two novels by Scott that launched the series established many plots and ideas that would reappear over the next ten years. The Spider, in the same mold as ruthless heroes such as The Shadow, was unafraid to kill the criminals he fought, and he would mark their bodies with an inked red spider. The Spider's secret identity was repeatedly discovered by the criminals, although the police were never able to learn it. Van Sloan was frequently caught by the villains, forcing Wentworth into danger; in some novels she fell into the criminals' hands several times. Wentworth's skill at disguise was presented as being extraordinary: he could alter his appearance at will and never be detected. All of these devices were used repeatedly by Scott's successors in the later novels.

Page's lead novels were dramatically more violent than Scott's. In Scott's first two novels, the Spider had been "a gentleman crook battling normal crooks", in Weinberg's words, but Page introduced villains that threatened millions of people, and plots that relied on science-fictional gadgets such as a metal-eating virus or giant robots. The master criminals included the Red Mandarin, a Fu Manchu-like archvillain, and Ssu Hsi Tze, who used poisonous animals to kill everyone working at a bank before robbing it. Several villains appeared in more than one novel: The Fly first appeared in Prince of the Red Looters in the August 1934 issue, and reappeared in March 1936 in Green Globes of Death; and Tang-Akhmut, the Living Pharaoh, was the antagonist in four consecutive novels, starting in September 1936 with The Coming of the Terror. Occasionally the villain of one of Page's Spider novels would turn out to have been only a minor character in the plot.

When Tepperman took over in 1936 he re-used some of the tropes he had written for other pulps such as Operator #5: villains cutting their victims almost in half with machine gun fire, or causing innocent bystanders to "stampede in blind panic". Sampson describes his female characters as doing little more than to "pose ornamentally at the edge of the action, their 'breasts heaving up and down tumultuously'". Bittner had experience writing for Popular's Terror Tales and Horror Stories, and his background in horror fiction was apparent in his plots for The Spider. For example, Bittner's The City That Dared Not Eat, which appeared in October 1937, featured criminals who were planning to secretly sell human flesh as meat. Murray describes the cover illustration for the issue as "the quintessential Spider cover, [showing] the Spider charging a group of masked butchers behind whom helpless people hung from meat hooks". In contrast, Tepperman set his Spider novels in a more conventional criminal underworld.

Popular's editors sometimes rewrote parts of the lead novels. In 1943, these rewrites became more substantial. Robert Turner, who began working for Popular at about this time, recalled "doing some heavy rewriting on the Spider 'novels' because the style seemed to be old-fashioned pulpy; too much action and too little emotional involvement". This was part of a trend in the pulp industry away from pure action and towards better characterization and realism.

=== Internal inconsistencies ===
The first issue included a short fictional biographical sketch of the Spider (probably written by Terrill), titled "The Web". This became an occasional feature, conducted by Leslie T. White, Linton Davies and Moran Tudury, the last few being credited only to "The Chief". The biographical details given in "The Web" were at odds with some of the details in Scott's novels. The inconsistencies grew as time went on: characters that died in one of Page's novels reappeared in later issues, and details in Tepperman's novels then contradicted the backstory that Page had established. Van Sloan was eventually given four mutually contradictory histories.

The plots themselves often had logical problems. Pulp historian Robert Weinberg describes Page's work as "fast-paced and well-written", but Will Murray, also a pulp historian, comments that "Page's imagination usually ran away with the story to the detriment of logic". Murray gives Master of the Death Machine, which appeared in August 1935, as an example of a plot where the "lapses in logic were major". Nor was there any attempt at continuity from story to story: the damage inflicted on New York by the Spider's foes inexplicably disappeared with the following issue, as Sampson comments: "New York City is shattered, burnt, melted, gassed, diseased, obliterated. But only for this issue. Next issue, the great towers gleam untarnished."

=== Short stories and non-fiction features ===
The Spider ran short stories in each issue, alongside the lead novel. The first issue included "Baited Death", by Leslie T. White, and "Murder Undercover", by Norvell Page. The stories that appeared in the magazine were detective fiction, often including horror elements. Occasionally, story elements appeared to be supernatural, but these were always explained away by the end of the story. Arthur Leo Zagat's stories about Doc Turner, a crime-fighting New York pharmacist, often featured in the magazine, as did Tepperman's series about Ed Race, a juggler known as the Masked Marksman. Other writers included Frank Gruber, who contributed four stories about Captain Douglas March, a crime-fighter; G. T. Fleming-Roberts; and Wyatt Blassingame.

A reader's club, the Spider League of Crime Prevention, was started; such clubs were a common marketing tactic among pulp magazines, particularly the hero pulps. Those who joined the club, for 25 cents, received a signet ring of white metal with a red spider outlined in white on a black background. Popular Publications sold many thousands of these; Steeger commented that "Every kid in the country must have wore [sic] one at one time or another." Popular also sold a mechanical pencil with a concealed rubber stamp that would print an ink image of a spider. An example of the pencil sold in 2011 for $2,300, and one of the rings sold for $2,134.62 in 2019.

A letter in the August 1941 issue reported that "Grant Stockbridge", the house name used since the third issue for the writer of the lead novel, had lost all his Spider magazines in a fire. This was not a fabrication: Page had lost all his magazines in a fire at his house. The fire also destroyed a hat and cloak that he had sometimes worn at Popular's offices and elsewhere in imitation of the Spider. (Note: The publisher, Harry Steeger, thought it possible that Page at times came to believe he himself was The Spider.)

=== Art ===
The cover for the first issue was painted by Walter Baumhofer. John Newton Howitt took over with the second issue, and stayed as the cover artist until late 1937. Howitt was a perfectionist, as Steeger later recalled:

It was as though we were preparing something for the Louvre. First there would be several hours of discussion about how the painting would be done and then John would bring it back for the most minute criticisms. I promise you, we covered every square inch of the cover and saw to it that it was done to perfection all the way through.

Rafael DeSoto painted the final 46 covers. Interior art was mostly contributed by J. Fleming Gould; these almost always included sketches of Wentworth and Van Sloan, as well as illustrations of action sequences from the novel. Small pictures of spiders were used to fill space.

== Bibliographic details ==
Issue data for The Spider
	Jan	Feb	Mar	Apr	May	Jun	Jul	Aug	Sep	Oct	Nov	Dec
1933										1/1	1/2	1/3
1934	1/4	2/1	2/2	2/3	2/4	3/1	3/2	3/3	3/4	4/1	4/2	4/3
1935	4/4	5/1	5/2	5/3	5/4	6/1	6/2	6/3	6/4	7/1	7/2	7/3
1936	7/4	8/1	8/2	8/3	8/4	9/1	9/2	9/3	9/4	10/1	10/2	10/3
1937	10/4	11/1	11/2	11/3	11/4	12/1	12/2	12/3	12/4	13/1	13/2	13/3
1938	13/4	14/1	14/2	14/3	14/4	15/1	15/2	15/3	15/4	16/1	16/2	16/3
1939	16/4	17/1	17/2	17/3	17/4	18/1	18/2	18/3	18/4	19/1	19/2	19/3
1940	19/4	20/1	20/2	20/3	20/4	21/1	21/2	21/3	21/4	22/1	22/2	22/3
1941	22/4	23/1	23/2	23/3	23/4	24/1	24/2	24/3	24/4	25/1	25/2	25/3
1942	25/4	26/1	26/2	26/3	26/4	27/1	27/2	27/3	27/4	28/1	28/2	28/3
1943	28/4	29/1	29/2			29/3		29/4		30/1		30/2
Issues of The Spider, showing volume and issue number. The colors identify the editors for each issue. The sequence given here is according to a recent bibliographic source, but other sources give varying accounts of the sequence of editors. Rogers Terrill (January 1939 – December 1942 Robert Turner and Ryerson Johnson (January – December 1943

Popular Publications published 118 issues of The Spider between October 1933 and December 1943. It was pulp format for all issues; it began at 128 pages and was reduced to 112 pages after March 1936. The price was 10 cents throughout its run. The volume numbering was entirely regular, with four issues per volume; the last issue was volume 30 number 2. It was monthly from the first issue until March 1943; the four remaining issues were dated June, August, October and December 1943.

Rogers Terrill was the initial editor, but pulp historians disagree on whether Terrill stayed as editor to the end of The Spider's run. Will Murray lists Terrill as the editor for all issues, but adds that by 1937 Terrill was editor-in-chief and that other editors worked on The Spider. Robert Weinberg lists Terrill's tenure as ending in the early 1940s. According to Weinberg, Robert Turner took over in 1943, and Ryerson Johnson edited the final issue, December 1943. The bibliographic site Galactic Central agrees with Weinberg, listing Terrill as editor until 1942, and Turner and Johnson as editors in 1943. Robert Sampson gives May 1936 as the last issue for which Terrill was responsible; Sampson then lists Loring Dowst (June 1936), Leon Byrne (July – October 1936), Linton Davies (November 1936 – November 1937), Moran Tudury (December 1937 – December 1939), Loring Dowst (January 1940 – August 1942), Harry Widmer (September 1942 – March 1943), Beatrice Jones (June 1943), Robert Turner (August 1943), and Ryerson Johson (October 1943).

Three issues of a British edition of The Spider are known to exist, and there was also a Canadian version that reprinted at least five issues in 1935. Two 15-chapter film serials were released during The Spider's run: The Spider's Web (1938) and The Spider Returns (1941).

== Sources ==
- Backer, Ron (2010). Gripping Chapters: The Sound Movie Serial. Albany, Georgia: BearManor Media. ISBN 978-1-59393-531-3.
- Gruber, Frank (1967). The Pulp Jungle. Los Angeles, California: Sherbourne Press. LCCN 67-21873.
- Murray, Will (1983). "The Spider". In Cook, Michael L. (ed.). Mystery, Detective, and Espionage Magazines. Westport, Connecticut: Greenwood Press. pp. 521–527. ISBN 0-313-23310-1.
- Murray, Will; Weinberg, Robert (1985). "The Shadow". In Tymn, Marshall B.; Ashley, Mike (eds.). Science Fiction, Fantasy and Weird Fiction Magazines. Westport, Connecticut: Greenwood Press. pp. 570–573. ISBN 0-3132-1221-X.
- Sampson, Robert (1983). "The Phantom Detective". In Cook, Michael L. (ed.). Mystery, Detective, and Espionage Magazines. Westport, Connecticut: Greenwood Press. pp. 408–414. ISBN 0-313-23310-1.
- Sampson, Robert (1987). Spider. Bowling Green, Ohio: Bowling Green State University Popular Press. ISBN 0-87972-398-X.
- Server, Lee (2002). Encyclopedia of Pulp Fiction Writers. New York: Checkmark Books. ISBN 0-8160-4577-1.
- Weinberg, Robert (1985). "The Spider". In Tymn, Marshall B.; Ashley, Mike (eds.). Science Fiction, Fantasy and Weird Fiction Magazines. Westport, Connecticut: Greenwood Press. pp. 602–604. ISBN 0-3132-1221-X.
