= R. T. M. Scott =

Canadian author (1882–1966)

- Born: Reginald Thomas Maitland Scott; August 14, 1882; Woodstock, Ontario
- Died: February 5, 1966 (aged 83); New York City, United States
- Occupation: Writer
- Spouse: Leslie Grant (m. 1907)
- Children: 1
- Writing career
- Period: 20th century
- Genres: Detective, espionage

Reginald Thomas Maitland Scott (August 14, 1882 – February 5, 1966) was a Canadian author of detective and espionage novels. He signed his works as R. T. M. Scott.

== Biography ==
Scott was born in Woodstock, Ontario, in 1882, the son of Alfred Maitland Scott and Elizabeth Bolby Willson. In 1901, he began studies at the Royal Military College in Kingston. He then worked as an engineer in India, Malaysia and from 1908 to 1911 in Ceylon. During the First World War, he served with the rank of captain in a Canadian Expeditionary Force in Belgium. Wounded, he was repatriated to Canada where he ended the war by working in the military administration.

After the war, he settled in New York and began a literary career. In 1920 he published What Bluff Dreams Are Made Of, where secret service agent Aurelius Smith first appears. From the second novel of the series, The Black Magician (1925), Smith became a New York criminologist who, like Sherlock Holmes, a character Scott idolized, received clients in his apartment. In 1935, the popular success of the series gave rise to a radio drama whose scripts were for the most part drafted by Scott himself.

In 1933, Scott wrote the first two novels in the pulp magazine series called The Spider. The series was continued by another author, Norvell Page who wrote under the pseudonym Grant Stockbridge. In 1938, Columbia Pictures made a 15-chapter serial entitled The Spider's Web based on the character, followed in 1941 by The Spider Returns. Scott was also interested in paranormal psychic phenomena and published several articles on the subject.

In 1907, he married Leslie Grant. They had one son born on May 23, 1909, in Columbo, Ceylon, who bore the same name as him. His son was nicknamed "Robert" to distinguish him from R.T.M., and he worked at Popular Publications as an assistant editor and published a handful of short stories himself. (Popular Publications was where The Spider comic series was published.) He collaborated with his father in the writing of the first two novels in the pulp series. Scott's son became a soldier during the Second World War and was killed in an accident in Germany on August 28, 1945, shortly after the war ended.

After his son's death, R.T.M. returned to writing but had little success. He died in New York in 1966, at the age of 83. In 2001, to mark the centenary of his entrance into RMC, the Massey library in Kingston, Ontario, established a special collection of his books in acknowledgement of his lifelong affection for RMC.

== Works ==
=== Novels and Short Stories ===
- Such Bluff As Dreams Are Made Of, (1920)
- Into The East, (1920)
- The Trap, (1922)
- Through The Ether, (1922)
- The Killer, (1923)
- The Emerald Coffin, (1923)
- Nimba, The Cave Girl, (1923)
- Secret Service Smith, (1923)
- Hanuman, The Monkey God, (1924)
- Underground, (1924)
- The Black Magician, (1925)
- The Crushed Pearl, (1926)
- Peter's Tower, (1927)
- The Sealed Flask, (1927)
- 3 Collar Buttons, (1927)
- Ann's Crime, (1927)
- Aurelius Smith, Detective, (1927)
- His Last Shot, (1928)
- Senga Of The Club Hibou, (1929)
- Bombay Duck, (1929)
- The Mad Monk, (1931)
- Women Loathed Her, (1932)
- The Spider Strikes, (1933)
- The Wheel of Death, (1933)
- Murder Stalks The Mayor, (1936)
- Levitation In Full Light, (1939)
- The Agony Column Murders, (1946)
- The Nameless Ones, (1947)

=== Articles on paranormal phenomena ===
- Is Roosevelt Psychic?, (1938)
- Unseen Forces Slaughter Mankind, (1938)
- Psychic Terms You Ought to Know, (1939)
