= Margie Harris =

American crime fiction writer

- Occupations: Journalist, pulp-fiction author
- Known for: gangster and crime fiction; true-crime journalism

Margie Harris (birth and death dates unknown) was a pulp writer from 1930 to 1939. She was one of the most popular authors in the short-lived gang pulp genre. Even in an era of hardboiled crime fiction, her stories were unusually hard-edged and bitter. Her best work includes ingenious plotting, remorselessly violent characters, and colorful underworld argot. Most of her early stories appeared in the Harold Hersey-published pulp magazines Gangster Stories, Mobs, Prison Stories, Racketeer Stories, and Gangland Stories. When Hersey sold off his assets, Harris continued to appear in the successor to Gangster Stories, Greater Gangster Stories.

After the collapse of the gang pulps in 1934, Harris diversified into a variety of crime pulps, The Phantom Detective, Thrilling Detective, Super-Detective Stories, Popular Detective, etc. When the gang genre was temporarily revived in the late 1930s in the pulps, Double-Action Gang Magazine and Ten Story Gang, Harris was a frequent contributor. Her published output includes fewer than a hundred known stories, low for a pulp writer, but many of them were novelettes or short novels.

Little is known of Harris' background. It is believed that "Margie Harris" is a pseudonym. The only biographical information comes from a jocular letter published in Gangster Stories. She claimed to have been a newspaper reporter; and many of her stories featured reporters and references to newspapers. From the cases she covered, she would have been in the Bay Area from approximately 1900-1915 and in Chicago from 1915-1930 (these ranges are very speculative). Criminals she knew in the Bay Area include Ed Morrell, the so-called Dungeon Man of San Quentin, and his neighbor in the solitary confinement cells, Jacob "Tiger Man" Oppenheimer. In Chicago, she was acquainted with the big-time mobster Big Jim Colosimo. Given her background, a birthdate around 1880 is plausible, which would have made her about 50 when her fiction career began in 1930.

Harris's last known whereabouts were in Texas. She appears to have lived in Texas during the entirety of her pulp-writing career. She wrote a number of true crime articles set in Houston and its vicinity for American Detective, which was published by the same company as Greater Gangster Stories.

== Selected stories ==
- "Death's Trapeze" (first known published story), Gangster Stories, May 1930.
- "Gyps That Pass in the Night," Gangland Stories, October 1930.
- "While Choppers Roared," Racketeer Stories, February 1931.
- "Little Big Shot," Gangster Stories, May 1932.
- "The She-Shamus," Conflict, January–February 1934.
- "When Dead Eyes Speak," The Underworld Detective, March 1935.
- "Crimson Harvest," Ten Story Gang, August 1938.
- "Problem for a Ranger" (last known original story), Popular Detective, December 1939 (reprinted in the December 1944 issue).
