= Spider (pulp fiction character) =

Pulp magazine character

The Spider
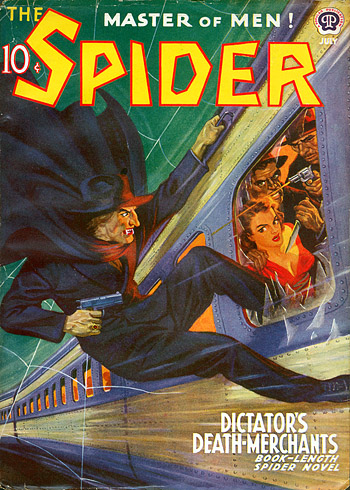
- Cover of book number 82, "The Dictator's Death Merchants", with art by Rafael DeSoto

Publication information
- Publisher: Popular Publications
- First appearance: The Spider #1 (October 1933): "The Spider Strikes"
- Created by: Harry Steeger

In-story information
- Alter ego: Richard Wentworth
- Supporting character of: Nita Van Sloan; Ram Singh; Ronald Jackson; Stanley Kirkpatrick
- Abilities: Genius intellect; Skilled in hand-to-hand combat; Expert marksman; Master of disguise

The Spider is an American pulp-magazine hero of the 1930s and 1940s. The character was created by publisher Harry Steeger and written by a variety of authors for 118 monthly issues of The Spider from 1933 to 1943. The Spider sold well during the 1930s, and copies are valued by modern pulp magazine collectors. Pulp magazine historian Ed Hulse has stated "Today, hero-pulp fans value The Spider more than any single-character magazine except for The Shadow and Doc Savage."

== Creation and publication history ==
The Spider was created in 1933 by Harry Steeger at Popular Publications as direct competition to Street and Smith Publications' vigilante hero the Shadow. Steeger said he got the idea for the character's name when he was playing tennis and saw a large spider walking along the edge of the court. Steeger also sought to emulate the films of Douglas Fairbanks, while historians George E. Turner and Michael H. Price felt the character was also descended from Siegfried, Fantômas and The Bat.

Recognizing that imitating the Shadow created the potential for lawsuits as well as the potential for strong sales, Streeger consulted his lawyer, who advised him to hire a writer with an established character and have him transform that character into the Spider. Thus, R.T.M. Scott's detective character Aurelius Smith and Hindu assistant Langa Doone became, respectively, Richard Wentworth and Ram Singh. The first two novels were written by R.T.M. Scott, but they were deemed too slow-paced, so another author was brought in. Later stories were published under the house pen name of "Grant Stockbridge", which was intended to recall Maxwell Grant, the house pen name which the Shadow novels were attributed to. Most of the Spider novels were actually written by Norvell Page. Other authors of the series included Donald C. Cormack, Wayne Rogers, Emile C. Tepperman, and Prentice Winchell. The series was the first Popular pulp to be named after a character rather than a genre.

The cover artists for The Spider magazine were Walter M. Baumhofer for the debut issue, followed by John Newton Howitt and Rafael De Soto. The Spider was published monthly and ran for 118 issues from 1933 to 1943. Sales declined in the late 1930s due to surging competition from superhero comics and (despite Spider novels making concessions to the popularity of superheroes, such as an increasing number of costumed villains) never fully recovered. Paper shortages during World War II and a declining readership following Page's departure to work on propaganda also played their part.

A 119th Spider novel manuscript (Slaughter Incorporated) had been completed but was not published until decades later (as Blue Steel), a heavily rewritten mass-market paperback with renamed characters. In 2012, Moonstone Books finally published it as Slaughter, Inc., in its original unedited form. The novel was again reprinted in 2018 by Altus Press as a facsimile edition, this time designed to look like a 1940s pulp.

== Stories ==
The Spider stories often involve a bizarre menace to the country and a criminal conspiracy. They were often extremely violent, with the villains engaging in wanton slaughter of thousands as part of sometimes nationwide crime sprees. Pulp magazine historian Ed Hulse noted that "Spider novel death tolls routinely ran into the thousands". The master criminal of the stories is usually unmasked only in the last few pages. The stories often end with Wentworth killing the villains and stamping their corpses' foreheads with his "Spider" mark.

Will Murray would note the character's brutality and willingness to kill criminals, even occasionally pre-emptively. Price and Turner also noted he was considerably more brutal and violent than other pulp heroes, especially under Page, who they stated "maintained in the character a viciousness that placed The Spider magazine in a par with the horror-anthology pulps of its day".

A complete list of all 119 Spider pulps in the original series is available online at fan sites (see The Spider | List.)

== Characters ==
=== The Spider ===
The Spider is millionaire playboy Richard Wentworth, who served as a major in World War I, and was living in New York City unaffected by the financial deprivations of the Great Depression. The ninth pulp represents him as the last surviving member of a rich family. Wentworth is easily identified as the Spider by his enemies in a number of earlier novels and is arrested by the police, only to escape. He adopts a cover identity - Tito Caliepi - and associated aliases. The Spider's earliest costume consisted of a simple black domino mask, black hat, and cape. Later in the series, vampire-like makeup appears, which is replaced with a face mask featuring grizzled hair and finally a hunchback. These are added to terrorize the criminal underworld, while the Spider dispenses his brand of violent vigilante justice. Utilizing his talent as a violinist, Wentworth (posing as Caliepi), sometimes uses busking as part of his disguise.

Wentworth also ventures into the underworld disguised as small-time hood Blinky McQuade in order to gain needed information. To Scotland Yard, Wentworth is known as Rupert Barton, who holds a badge of Inspector for services rendered; by the fifth novel, he also holds the rank of lieutenant in the FBI. Wentworth, according to the fifth story, is 5 ft 11 in (1.80 m) tall, and has grey eyes. He has an old battle scar on his head that flares up at times of great stress. He is an accomplished pianist and violinist, and drives a Lancia. He speaks fluent Hindustani and so talks with Ram Singh in his own language, with little fear anyone else would understand what is being said. As written by Page, Wentworth was also psychologically vulnerable and suffers frequent bouts of fear, self-doubt, despair and paranoia.

==== The Spider's seal and weapons ====
The Spider's calling card is a red-ink spider image (like a drop of blood) left on the foreheads of the criminals he kills, so others will not be blamed. In the sixth novel (1934), the Spider imprints his red sign on a gold ring so that any who need his help can use it by taking it to Kirkpatrick (where Wentworth will find out about it). The Spider's seal was concealed in the base of his platinum cigarette lighter, and was invented by Professor Brownlee. The Spider also carried a thin silken line (his "web") which had a tensile strength of several hundred pounds. Wentworth was also a master of disguise. In the small steel case of burglar tools he carried under his arm, he also had his make-up kit and (in the early novels) his Spider's eye mask.

Like The Shadow, The Spider's usual weapons of choice are a pair of Colt .45 caliber M1911 automatic pistols. He is a crack shot and normally shoots to kill. However, he would not shoot anyone in law enforcement, although they frequently are under orders to shoot to kill him on sight. Brownlee also invented the lethal and almost silent air pistol the Spider used for "quiet" kills. He acted as a sort of on-call weaponsmith for Wentworth, whom he looked upon as being close to a son. Wentworth also had a gun in one of his shoes, which he used twice in the 5th novel.

In Timothy Truman's 1990s comic book adaptation, Brownlee created the "Web-Lee", a non-lethal stun pistol that fired projectiles which erupted into a spider web-like mass, inundated with microscopic barbs of frozen curare.

==== "Master of Men" ====
The Spider's by-name is "Master of Men", indicating that he has a voice commanding enough to get many people to do his bidding. Wentworth can also imitate other people's voices. When he imitates Kirkpatrick's voice, he can give orders to lesser policemen during a stakeout, even during one intended to capture The Spider, so he can himself escape. Wentworth was not above disguising himself as a cop to escape when surrounded by policemen.

=== Supporting characters ===
- Nita Van Sloan is Wentworth's longtime fiancée, who often aids him. Though they are as close as man and wife, they know they could never marry and have a family, as Wentworth believes he will eventually be unmasked or killed as The Spider, and his wife and family would then pay the price. In the issue #100 story, "Death and The Spider", Wentworth expects to die. Nita disguises herself as The Spider a few times, covering for Wentworth when he has been seriously injured.
- Ram Singh, a Sikh (originally Hindu), is Wenthworth's fanatically loyal manservant; he is a deadly knife thrower and usually carries several knives with him, including the deadly kukri. Ram Singh never views his position as a servant as demeaning or negatively impacting his self-respect, feeling that he serves a man totally above other men. At times, he and Wentworth talk in Hindustani, which only they understand.
- Sergeant Ronald Jackson, Wentworth's chauffeur, served under Wentworth in World War I and often refers to him as "the Major". He is killed by "The Avenger" in "The Pain Emperor" (Feb 1935). However he is revived in "The Reign of the Death Fiddler" (May 1, 1935) when it is revealed that Ram Singh saved him and brought him back to full health, ignoring the fact that Jackson had been given a military burial.
- Harold Jenkyns is Wentworth's butler, an elderly man who has been in the Wentworth family's service for a long time.
- Police Commissioner Stanley Kirkpatrick or simply "Kirk", is Wentworth's closest friend, who is sure Wentworth is The Spider but can never prove it. He has promised to arrest him, try him, and send him to the electric chair if he ever has proof.
- Professor Ezra Brownlee, an inventor and Wentworth's old war colleague, features heavily in the early Spider novels; he is killed in Dragon Lord of the Underworld (July 1935). Brownlee's son makes some appearances afterward, taking over from his late father. Brownlee's unjust arrest is what motivated Wentworth to take the law into his own hands for the first time.

=== Enemies ===
Despite The Spider's tendency to kill his enemies, he encounters several foes more than once, such as The Fly and MUNRO, a master of disguise, both of whom were killed at the conclusion of their first encounter with the Spider. Some storylines featuring a struggle against a single villain run for several consecutive issues, such as The Spider's four-part battle against Tang-Akhmut, the Living Pharaoh (issues #36, 37, 38 and 39), and The Spider's three-part battle against The Master and his Black Police (#60, 61 and 62), which was reprinted decades later in a single volume as The Spider vs The Empire State. Some enemies he encountered had names like the costumed super-villains of comic books, such as Judge Torture, Red Feather, The Bloody Serpent, The Brain, The Emperor of Vermin, The Red Mandarin, The Silencer, and The Wreck.

== Movie serials ==
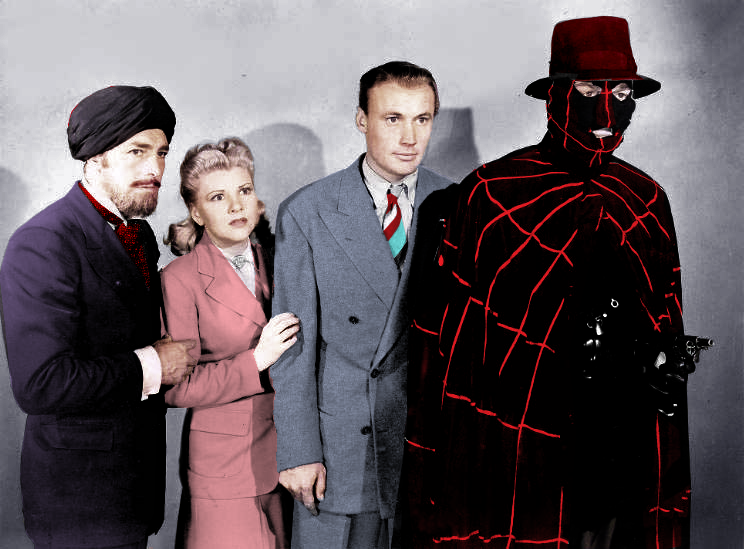
Colorized publicity still for the movie serial The Spider Returns (Columbia 1941).

Columbia Pictures produced two Spider movie serials, both 15-chapter cliffhangers starring Warren Hull as Richard Wentworth. The first, The Spider's Web (1938), was also the first film serial to be made from a popular pulp magazine series character. In this serial The Spider battles The Octopus and his henchmen, who attempt to disrupt all commercial and passenger transportation systems, and later all U. S. industry. Spider pulp magazine novelist Norvell Page was one of the writers who worked on the serial's screenplay. Compared to other light-hearted action-adventure serials, Price and Turner felt The Spider series owed more to film noir, noting The Spider's Web had a "morbid desperation" that bucked censorship standards. They ranked it as one of the best Columbia serials, and one of the few to truly do justice to its source material, noting the fast pace and high body count. The Octopus would feature in a short-lived Page-written pulp series for Popular that was rapidly reworked as The Scorpion.

In the second serial, The Spider Returns (1941), The Spider battles the mysterious crime lord The Gargoyle and his henchmen, who threaten the world with acts of sabotage and wholesale murder in an effort to wreck the U. S. national defense. Price and Turner bemoaned the sequel for abandoning the two-director system, calling it a "wartime replay of Web's story", also criticising the reduced role for Nita Van Sloane, now played by novice Mary Ainslee.

Both serials have The Spider's black cape and head mask over-printed with a white spider's web pattern and then matched with his usual plain black fedora. This addition gave the silver screen Spider an appearance more like that of a superhero, like other pulp and comics heroes being adapted for the era's movie serials.

== Reprints ==
Many, if not all, of the original 118 Spider pulp magazine novels have been reprinted over the years in both mass-market paperback and trade paperback editions or some other form. Very few attempts have been made, however, to publish the novels in chronological order, making it difficult for collectors to read them in the order in which they originally appeared.

Berkley Books (then Berkley/Medallion) first reprinted the Spider in 1969 and 1970, intending to reprint all 118 novels in order, hoping to tap into the reprint phenomenon of the Doc Savage novels being published by Bantam Books. However, these first paperback reissues met with poor sales. After reprinting only the first four volumes in the original pulp series, Berkley canceled the series.

In the mid-1970s Pocket Books reprinted four Spider novels (originally published as pulps #16, 21, 26 and 100), featuring modernized pulp cover artwork by Robert A. Maguire. In this series, The Spider (renamed simply "Spider") is portrayed as a non-costumed, heavily armed muscular blond-haired hero (similar to Roger Moore's James Bond). These paperbacks also failed to sell, and the series was canceled. These four novels were re-edited and heavily modernized. In the reprint of Death and the Spider for example (originally published as pulp #100 in 1942), Nita Van Sloan drives a Jaguar E-type X-KE, a sports car not created until 1961, some 19 years later.

At roughly the same time in England, Mews Books/New American Library reprinted the same four Spider novels (#16, 21, 26 and 100) sporting entirely new cover art, but different in style and execution from those used by Pocket Books. Also called "Spider", this character also resembled a non-costumed James Bond-type character (only with black hair instead of blonde). This British Spider mass market series also ended after the four titles were released.

In 1979, Python Publishing published the never-before-seen last original Spider novel, Slaughter, Inc. (written by Donald G. Cormack), which was originally scheduled to have been published in 1944 as The Spider #119. Python published it as a one-shot mass market paperback. For copyright reasons, all of the characters' names were changed, the story was retitled Blue Steel: The Ultimate Answer To Evil, and the author was credited as "Spider Page" (a reference to the pulp series' original author, Norvell Page). The Spider was recast in this book as a character named "Blue Steel". As with Pocket Books' modernized "Spider" editions, this paperback sported a modernized pulp cover painting featuring a non-costumed, but heavily armed, blond-haired hero (said to be an unused cover painting by artist George Gross, produced but never used for a Freeway Press reprint of another pulp magazine character, Operator No. 5). In 2012, Moonstone Books finally published the 119th Spider novel Slaughter, Inc. in its original unedited form. The novel was reprinted yet again in 2018 by Altus Press as a "facsimile edition", this time designed to look exactly how The Spider #119 pulp would have looked had it been published in 1944.

In 1980 Dimedia, Inc. (a.k.a. Pulp Press) reprinted three Spider pulp novels (#9, 10 and 11) in the larger trade paperback format. In 1984, they reprinted those same three novels as mass market paperbacks, sporting new cover paintings of the original costumed Spider by artists Ken Kelly (on volumes one and two) and Frank Kelly Freas (on volume three).

In the early 1990s Carroll & Graf Publishers issued a series of eight mass market Spider paperbacks, each one reprinting two complete Spider novels. These 16 novels were the longest-running Spider reprint series done for the mass market paperback book market up to that time. The novels reprinted in this series were #14, 15, 17, 26, 30, 40, 41, 50, 52, 54, 75, 76, 78, 81, 92 and 113. All of them use the original The Spider pulp magazine artwork for their covers. (One cover was a newly done painting by Rafael DeSoto, the original pulp cover artist.)

After Carroll & Graf, several specialized small press pulp reprint houses tried their hand at reprinting The Spider series. Bold Venture Press published ten issues of The Spider (#5, 6, 7, 8, 16, 26, 31, 50, 69 and 70). Wildside Press published two The Spider reprints (#78 and 92).

Pulp Adventure Press (PAP) reprinted 12 Spider novels in a magazine-sized format, even including the original interior artwork from the pulps (#12, 31, 36, 37, 38, 39, 44, 45, 46, 47, 48 and 85).

Girasol Collectables (aka Adventure House) reissued the novels as a series of single pulp novel facsimile editions, as well as re-typeset stories in "pulp double novel" trade paperbacks. Both series use the original pulp magazine cover artwork for their books. Girasol published the first 23 issues of the original pulp series as "facsimile" editions. They also published 25 of their "double-novel format" issues, which total 50 novels reprinted in all (#1, 3, 9, 10, 11, 13, 14, 19, 20, 22, 25, 27, 28, 29, 32, 34, 35, 42, 43, 49, 51, 53, 54, 55, 57, 59, 64, 66, 70, 71, 72, 77, 82, 83, 86, 87, 91, 95, 98, 100, 101, 102, 103, 104, 105, 107, 108, 110, 112 and 114).

In 2007, New York science fiction publisher Baen Books published a trade paperback featuring three Spider novel reprints (#16, 74 and 85). In 2008, they released a second companion trade paperback featuring two more Spider reprints (#26 and 75) as well as a third bonus story about another pulp hero called "The Octopus". In 2009, Baen re-issued both volumes as mass market paperbacks. The Baen editions sported brand new Spider cover paintings by noted graphic designer and comics artist Jim Steranko.

Also in 2007, Moonstone Books published an original anthology of brand new Spider short story pastiches entitled The Spider Chronicles. In 2013, Moonstone published a second anthology, The Spider: Extreme Prejudice featuring 12 more brand new Spider short story pastiches.

In late 2009, Doubleday's Science Fiction Book Club reprinted (in hardcover) Baen's second Spider three-in-one volume from the previous year. This became the first Spider hardcover edition ever to be published.

In August 2009, Age of Aces reprinted The Spider's Black Police trilogy in a single volume which they titled "The Spider vs. The Empire State". This trilogy consisted of three 1938 issues that were connected plotwise: #60 (September 1938), #61 (October 1938) and #62 (November 1938).

In October 2012, Moonstone Books published an original Spider pastiche novel, Shadow of Evil, by C. J. Henderson.

In 2013, Sanctum Books reprinted 20 Spider novels in ten "double novel issues". Each book contained two reprinted novels. The pulps Sanctum reprinted were # 3, 4, 5, 6, 8, 16, 17, 18, 30, 31, 68, 74, 78, 90, 92, 93, 96, 106, 111 and 118.

The Vintage Library has 34 licensed Spider novel reprints in the PDF format. For a small fee, each one can be downloaded from their website.

Facsimile Spider novels continue to appear in print from other publishers, especially Altus Press; they have also been issued in the Kindle e-book format.

Altus Press has begun reprinting the entire Spider series of novels in their original order of publication beginning with #1, on a monthly basis. (Each book only contains one novel.) Altus also launched (in August 2018) a "Wild Adventures of The Spider" pastiche novel series. The first pastiche was written by Will Murray. The Doom Legion has Richard Wentworth team up with James Christopher (a.k.a. "Operator No. 5") and "G-8", two of Popular Publications' top pulp heroes. Two pastiche sequels, Fury in Steel and Scourge of the Scorpion by Will Murray, both came out in 2021.

== Comics and graphic novels ==
=== Eclipse Comics ===
In December 1990 American comic publisher Eclipse Comics announced plans to produce a comic book series based on the character. Writer and artist Timothy Truman based the three-issue limited series on the 1934 story "The Corpse Cargo", and the series was issued in the 'prestige' square-bound format popularised by DC Comics' The Dark Knight Returns; Enrique Alcatena contributed to the art. As noted in Comics Scene #19, Truman set his version of The Spider in the "1990s as seen by the 1930s". Elements of this version of the Spider's milieu include airships as common transportation, the survival of the League of Nations into the near past - Wentworth meets Ram Singh during an intervention into India and Pakistan - and World War II, if it ever happened, taking place differently. This series featured an African-American Commissioner Kirkpatrick. Truman chose to redesign the character, removing the hat and toning down the exaggerated monstrous look of Wentworth's crime-fighting guise. He had originally planned to have the character wrap his face in bandages before becoming aware of Sam Raimi's then-upcoming film Darkman. A long-time fan of the character, Truman had previous tried to get an adaptation made with First Comics early in his career.

Reviewing the title for Amazing Heroes, Fred Patten gave the first issue three stars out of five, bemoaning that the beloved character had been revised to "another grim vigilante". However in the same magazine T. M. Maple, who had not previously heard of the character, found it much more pleasing, though he felt it was weaker that Truman's best works. The series was a moderate sales success for Eclipse. and as a result they produced a three-issue follow-up The Spider: Reign of the Vampire King (based on "Death Reign of the Vampire King") the following year. However, Eclipse would go out of business before any further material could be produced.

=== Moonstone Books ===
Between 2009 and 2011, Moonstone Books published several comics based on the original pulp character, including crossovers with fellow pulp heroes Domino Lady and Operator No. 5

=== Dynamite Entertainment ===
In August 2011, Dynamite Entertainment announced an updated Spider comic book series, written by novelist David Liss; the first issue was released in May 2012. Award-winning artist Ron Lesser painted the first three issues (May-July). The Spider's costume in this series is based on the one worn by actor Warren Hull in Columbia's 1940s Spider movie serials, but the black costume's web lines are rendered in blood red instead of white. This comics series depicts The Spider and his allies fighting crime in a modern-day U. S. The 17-issue series received largely positive reviews.

In December 2012, Dynamite released the first issue of Masks, an eight-issue comic book miniseries that teams The Spider with Dynamite's other pulp hero-based comic book characters, including the Green Hornet and Kato, The Shadow, and a 1930s descendant of Zorro. Together, they fight a powerful criminal syndicate which secretly controls New York City through the corrupt and powerful Justice Party, which has seized complete control over the city. This miniseries, set in the Depression Era of the 1930s, was not in the same continuity as Dynamite's The Spider comic book series.

== Influence ==
Notable fans of The Spider include Charles M. Schulz, who confessed that "I could hardly stand to live from one month to another when the new Spider novel would come out." and Stan Lee, who named the character as a major influence on the creation of Spider-Man in the book Origins of Marvel Comics. Will Murray noted the similarity between the Spider's costume in the movie serials and the original Spider-Man costume, and the common element of both characters being perpetually sought by authorities unaware of their true identities.
