= Will Murray =

American novelist (1953–2026)

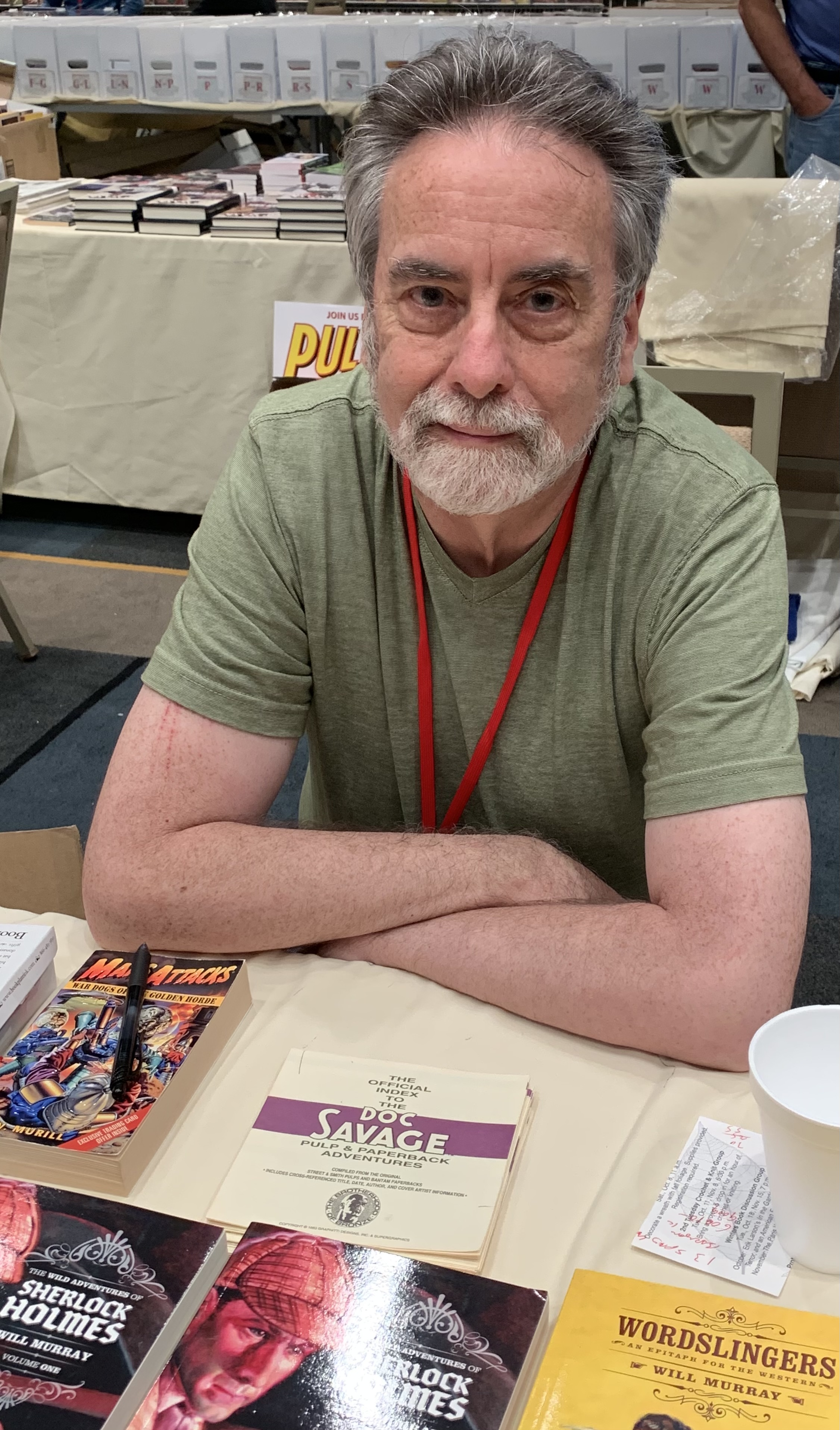
- Murray at PulpFest 2021
- Born: William Patrick Murray; April 28, 1953 Boston, Massachusetts, U.S.
- Died: August 25, 2026 (aged 73) Quincy, Massachusetts, U.S.
- Area: Writer
- Notable works: The Destroyer; Squirrel Girl

William Patrick Murray (April 28, 1953 – August 25, 2026) was an American novelist, journalist, short story, and comic book writer. Much of his fiction was published under pseudonyms. With artist Steve Ditko, he co-created the superhero Squirrel Girl.

== Life and career ==
=== Early life and career ===
William Patrick Murray was born on April 28, 1953. He grew up in Boston, Massachusetts, and graduated North Quincy High School in June 1971, subsequently graduating summa cum laude from the University of Massachusetts at Boston. After becoming a fan of the pulp fiction hero Doc Savage, he began collecting pulp magazines and wrote two psychological profiles of the character in The Doc Savage Reader. He went on to write for fanzines and edit the fanzines Duende and Skullduggery before joining the pulp-reprint publisher Odyssey Publications. He also co-authored the study The Duende History of The Shadow Magazine. Circa 1978, "I discovered the outline to [Doc Savage creator] Lester Dent's unwritten Python Isle and decided to take a shot at writing it. Bantam [Books] passed on it initially, and by the time they came back and asked for it and two more Docs, I was busily ghosting [the adventure paperback series] The Destroyer for [series co-creator] Warren Murphy."

=== Novels and magazines ===
The Destroyer assignment had come about when Murray, editing Skullduggery, sought out Murphy and The Destroyer co-creator Richard Sapir for an interview, and later did freelance research for Sapir. This led to his editing a Destroyer sourcebook, The Assassin's Handbook (1982), and eventually ghostwriting the series, beginning with the 56th book, Encounter Group (1984). He began writing the series regularly with the 69th book, Blood Ties, altogether ghosting book #69 through book #107, Feast or Famine. Murray has also written Cthulhu Mythos stories, including a pair of stories about Nug and Yeb, the Twin Blasphemies, and contributed single novels in The Executioner and Mars Attacks series. He wrote the retro-pulp collection Spicy Zeppelin Stories under various pen names.

Murray is also an author of nonfiction articles about pulp magazine writers such as Doc Savage creator Lester Dent and the Shadow creator Walter B. Gibson; starting in 1979, he was the literary executor for the estate of Dent, and published twenty-one Doc Savage novels from Dent's outlines under Dent's pseudonym, Kenneth Robeson. His 2013 The Wild Adventures of Doc Savage novel, Doc Savage: Skull Island, teams him up with King Kong.

In June 2015, Altus Press inaugurated the series The Wild Adventures of Tarzan in the novel Tarzan: Return to Pal-ul-don, an authorized sequel to Edgar Rice Burroughs' 1921 novel, Tarzan the Terrible. Late in 2016, Altus released a follow-up novel, King Kong Vs. Tarzan. Early in 2020, "Tarzan, Conqueror of Mars" was released, in which John Carter of Mars was revived. In 2023, Tarzan: Back to Mars was released.

In October 2016, Altus Press released Six Scarlet Scorpions, the first entry in a new spinoff series centering around Doc Savage's adventuress cousin, called The Wild Adventures of Pat Savage. Murray wrote the novel from an outline written by the character's creator, Lester Dent.

In August, 2018, Altus Press released The Spider: The Doom Legion, reviving the pulp hero known as The Spider, as well as James Christopher, Operator 5, and G-8 of G-8 and His Battles Aces fame. A sequel, The Spider: Fury in Steel, was published in January, 2021. The Spider: Scourge of the Scorpion and The Spider: The Hangman from Hell followed.

In June, 2020, Altus Press released The Wild Adventures of Sherlock Holmes, collecting ten of Murray's Sherlock Holmes short stories. Four subsequent volumes were published between 2023 and 2024.

For Necronomicon Press, he edited Tales of Zothique and The Book of Hyperborea, two collections of stories by Clark Ashton Smith. His essays have appeared in books ranging from S. T. Joshi's compendium on H. P. Lovecraft, An Epicure in the Terrible, to Jim Beard's survey of the 1960s Batman TV show, Gotham City 14 Miles. He also contributed to the encyclopedias St. James Crime and Mystery Writers, St. James Science Fiction Writers, Contemporary Authors and The Dictionary of Literary Biography. A collection of his Doc Savage articles was published by Altus Press under the title Writings in Bronze in 2011. As a contributing editor of Starlog magazine, Murray wrote for that publication and for Starlog Press movie tie-in publications.

His stories have appeared in The UFO Files, Future Crime, Miskatonic University, 100 Wicked Little Witch Stories, 100 Creepy Little Creature Stories, 100 Vicious Little Vampire Stories, The Cthulhu Cycle, Disciples of Cthulhu II, Cthulhu's Reign, Worlds of Cthulhu, The Yig Cycle, Dead But Dreaming II, Horror for the Holidays, The Mountains of Madness, Tales from the Miskatonic Library, Dracula Unfanged, Shadows Out of Time, Unknown Superheroes vs. the Forces of Darkness, Thrilling Adventure Yarns, Six-Gun Legends, Nightbeat: Night Stories and other collections.

For National Public Radio, he adapted Lester Dent's 1934 novel The Thousand-Headed Man as a six-part serial for The Adventures of Doc Savage, which aired in 1985, and was released on CD by Radioarchives.com in October 2010.

For Radio Archives, Murray produced the Will Murray Pulp Classics line of audio and ebooks, starring such pulp heroes as The Spider and G-8 and His Battle Aces.

With S. T. Joshi and Jon L. Cooke, Murray organized The Friends of H. P. Lovecraft, which raised funds to place a memorial plaque dedicated to the Providence fantasy writer on the grounds of Brown University's John Hay Library on the centennial of Lovecraft's birth in August 1990.

In 2000 Murray wrote the novel Nick Fury, Agent of S.H.I.E.L.D.: Empyre for Marvel comics. The story, which predicted the operational details of the Year 2001 terror attacks on New York and Washington a year before they transpired, identified the author as a trained remote viewer and professional psychic.

Beginning in 2006, Murray was a consulting editor for Sanctum Books' Doc Savage, Shadow, Avenger and Whisperer reprints. He has also written dozens of introductions to the reprints being published by Altus Press, covering characters such as Lester Dent's Lee Nace and Frederick Nebel's Black Mask detective, Ben Donohue. With Off-Trail Publications' John Locke, he has co-edited the three-volume The Gangland Sagas of Big Nose Serrano, which collects all 12 of Anatole Feldman's Big Nose Serrano stories. For Black Dog Books, he penned introductions to their ongoing Lester Dent Library series of pulp-magazine reprints.

Murray's exhaustive survey, Wordslingers: An Epitaph for the Western, delved into the American Western story as it evolved in the pages of the pulp magazines of the first half of the 20th century.

Stepping into the metaphysical and spiritual genre, Murray explored the nature and origin of God in his 2016 ebook, Forever After, which he wrote under his full name of William Patrick Murray. The channelled work is told in the form of a fable, with the narrative unfolding from God's point of view.

=== Comic books ===
A contributor to numerous prose anthologies, Murray has written short stories of the characters Superman, Batman, Wonder Woman, Spider-Man, Ant-Man, the Hulk, the Spider, The Avenger, the Gray Seal, the Green Hornet, The Secret 6, Sherlock Holmes, Sky Captain and the World of Tomorrow, Honey West, Zorro and Lee Falk's the Phantom.

For Marvel Comics, Murray co-created the superhero Squirrel Girl with artist Steve Ditko. He scripted The Destroyer black-and-white magazine, as well as single stories starring Iron Man and the Punisher. Murray wrote the introduction to the Marvel Comics Omnibus volume, which celebrates the 70th anniversary of Marvel Comics, as well as introductions to Volume 2 of Daring Mystery Comics, Mighty Thor Masterworks Volume 9, Mystic Comics Volume 1, Young Allies Volume 2 and Golden Age Captain America Volume 6.

=== Death ===
Murray died on August 25, 2026, at the age of 73.

== Awards ==
In 1979, he became the fourth winner of the Lamont Award for his contributions to the furtherance of pulp fiction research. In 1999, he earned the Comic Book Marketplace award for research excellence in the area of comics history. Murray received the 2011 Pulp Ark Award for Best Series Revival for his work on The Wild Adventures of Doc Savage. His Doc Savage novel, Doc Savage: Skull Island, won the 2014 Pulp Factory Award for Best Novel. In 2021, Murray was awarded the Golden Lion Award for his contributions to the furtherance of the works of Tarzan creator, Edgar Rice Burroughs. He received the First Fandom Hall of Fame Award in 2023 for his many career achievements.

== Selected works ==
=== Fiction ===
==== Novels ====
- Python Isle, as by Kenneth Robeson, (1991) [Doc Savage #184]
- White Eyes, as by Kenneth Robeson, (1992) [Doc Savage #185]
- The Frightened Fish, as by Kenneth Robeson, (1992) [Doc Savage #186]
- The Jade Ogre, as by Kenneth Robeson, (1992) [Doc Savage #187]
- Flight Into Fear, as by Kenneth Robeson, (1993) [Doc Savage #188]
- The Whistling Wraith, as by Kenneth Robeson, (1993) [Doc Savage #189]
- The Forgotten Realm, as by Kenneth Robeson, (1993) [Doc Savage #190]
- Mars Attacks! War Dogs of the Golden Horde, as by Ray W. Murill, Del Rey Books (1996)
- Nick Fury, Agent of Shield: Empyre, Berkley Boulevard Books (2000)
- The Wild Adventures of Doc Savage: The Desert Demons, as by Kenneth Robeson, Altus Press (2011)
- The Wild Adventures of Doc Savage: Horror in Gold, as by Kenneth Robeson, Altus Press (2011)
- The Wild Adventures of Doc Savage: The Infernal Buddha, as by Kenneth Robeson, Altus Press (2012)
- The Wild Adventures of Doc Savage: Death's Dark Domain, as by Kenneth Robeson, Altus Press (2012)
- The Wild Adventures of Doc Savage: The Miracle Menace, as by Kenneth Robeson, Altus Press (2013)
- The Wild Adventures of Doc Savage: Phantom Lagoon, as by Kenneth Robeson, Altus Press (2013)
- The Wild Adventures of Doc Savage: Skull Island, Altus Press (2013)
- The Wild Adventures of Doc Savage: The War Makers, as by Kenneth Robeson, Altus Press (2014)
- The Wild Adventures of Doc Savage: The Ice Genius, as by Kenneth Robeson, Altus Press (2014)
- The Wild Adventures of Doc Savage: The Sinister Shadow, as by Kenneth Robeson, Altus Press (2015)
- The Wild Adventures of Edgar Rice Burroughs (Vol 1): Return to Pal-ul-don, Altus Press (2015)
- The Wild Adventures of Pat Savage (Vol 1): Six Scarlet Scorpions, Altus Press (2016)
- King Kong vs. Tarzan Altus Press (2016)
- The Wild Adventures of Doc Savage: Glare of the Gorgon, as by Kenneth Robeson, Altus Press (2016)
- The Wild Adventures of Doc Savage: Empire of Doom, as by Kenneth Robeson, Altus Press (2017)
- The Wild Adventures of Doc Savage: Mr. Calamity & The Valley of Eternity, as by Kenneth Robeson, Altus Press (2018)
- The Wild Adventures of The Spider (Book 1): The Doom Legion, Altus Press (2018)
- The Wild Adventures of Edgar Rice Burroughs (Vol 9): Tarzan, Conqueror of Mars, Altus Press (2020)
- The Wild Adventures of The Spider (Book 2): Fury in Steel, Altus Press (2021)
- The Wild Adventures of The Spider (Book 3): Scourge of the Scorpion, Altus Press (2022)
- The Wild Adventures of Edgar Rice Burroughs (Vol 12): Tarzan, Back to Barsoom, Altus Press (2023)
- Secret Agent X vs. Doctor Death, Odyssey Publications (2026)

==== Collections ====
- The Wild Adventures of Sherlock Holmes, Altus Press (2020)
- The Wild Adventures of Sherlock Holmes Volume Two, Odyssey Publications (2023)
- The Wild Adventures of Sherlock Holmes Volume Three, Odyssey Publications (2023)
- The Wild Adventures of Sherlock Holmes Volume Four, Odyssey Publications (2024)
- The Wild Adventures of Cthulhu: Volume One, Odyssey Publications (2022)
- The Wild Adventures of Cthulhu: Volume Two, Odyssey Publications (2022)
- The Wild Adventures of Cthulhu: Volume Three, Odyssey Publications (2024)
- Spicy Zeppelin Stories, Odyssey Publications (2023)

==== Short stories ====
- "Snail Ghost", Eldritch Tales #11, 1985
- "A Trillion Young", in Tales from the Miskatonic University Library (PS Publishing, 2017)

==== Comic book stories ====
- "The Coming of ... Squirrel Girl" (origin story), Marvel Super-Heroes, Winter 1991

=== Nonfiction ===
==== Books ====
- The Duende History of the Shadow Magazine, Odyssey Publications (1980)
- Writings in Bronze, Altus Press (2011)
- Wordslingers: An Epitaph for the Western, Altus Press (2013)
- Master of Mystery: The Rise of The Shadow, Odyssey Publications (2021)
- Dark Avenger: The Strange Saga of The Shadow, Odyssey Publications (2022)
- Knight of Darkness: The Legend of The Shadow, Odyssey Publications (2025)

==== Articles ====
- "Reflections in a Flake-Gold Eye", The Doc Savage Club Reader #2/3, 1973 [first published article]
- "The Old Pulp Writers," Xenophile #33, May/June 1977
- "Narrathoth, the Forgotten", Crypt of Cthulhu #35, 1985
- "The Once & Future Captain," Starlog #115, February 1987
- "The Riddle of the Key," The Armchair Detective, Summer 1989
- “DC’s Tangled Roots”, Comic Book Marketplace, November 1997
- "Riddle of the Rabble Rouser," Alter Ego #58, May 2006
- " 'The Driving Force That Really Made DC Great'," Alter Ego #98, December 2010 [career of Whitney Ellsworth]
- "The First Time I Met Tarzan," Retro Fan, Summer 2019
- "The Dobie Gillis Dilemma," Retro Fan, Fall 2019
- "Jonny Quest creator Doug Wildey," Retro Fan, Winter 2020
- "Honey West, the Private Eyeful," Retro Fan, April 2020
- "The Secret Origin of Spider-Man," Retro Fan, September 2020
- "Marvel's Founding Father—Martin Goodman," Alter Ego #165, September 2020
- "Who Created Casper the Friendly Ghost?," Retro Fan, November 2020
- "George Bruce, the Flying Fabulist," Blood ’n’ Thunder Annual, 2021
- "Sheena, Pin-up Queen of the TV Jungle," Retro Fan, January 2021
- "Who Created The Man from U.N.C.L.E.?," Retro Fan, July 2021
- "The Maddening Mystery of Magneto," Jack Kirby Collector #81, Fall 2021
- "Walter Gibson Remembers Street & Smith's Comics," Alter Ego #176, July 2022
- "He-Man and the Masters of the Universe," Retro Fan, September 2022
- "The Mighty, Mighty Hercules," Retro Fan, September/October 2023

==== Introductions ====
- The Gangland Sagas of Big Nose Serrano: Vol 1: Dames, Dice and the Devil, by Anatole Feldman, Off-Trail Publications (2008)
- The Gangland Sagas of Big Nose Serrano: Vol 2: Horses, Hoboes and Heroes, by Anatole Feldman, Off-Trail Publications (2008)
- Thunder Jim Wade: The Complete Series, by Henry Kuttner, Altus Press (2008)
- The Bat Strikes Again And Again!, by Johnston McCulley, Altus Press (2009)
- The Gangland Sagas of Big Nose Serrano: Vol 3: Hell's Gangster, by Anatole Feldman, Off-Trail Publications (2009)
- Super-Detective Jim Anthony: The Complete Series, Vol 1, by Victor Rousseau, Altus Press (2009)
- When the Death-Bat Flies: The Detective Stories of Norvell Page, Altus Press (2010)
- G Stands for Glory: The G-Man Stories of Norvell Page, Altus Press (2010)
- The Crimes of The Scarlet Ace: The Complete Stories of Major Lacy & Amusement, Inc., by Theodore A. Tinsley, Altus Press (2011)
- The Cobra: The King of Detectives, by Richard B. Sale, Altus Press (2011)
- King of Fang and Claw: The Complete Pulp Magazine Adventures, by Bob Byrd, Altus Press (2011)
- The Complete Casebook of Cardigan, Vol 1: 1931-32, by Frederick Nebel, Altus Press (2013)
- Operator #5: The Complete Purple Wars, by Emile C. Tepperman, Altus Press (2019)

==== Obituaries ====
- "Walter B. Gibson", Locus, January 1986
- "Walter M. Baumhofer", Locus, November 1987
- "Norman Saunders", Locus, May 1989
