= The Twinkler =

1916 film by Edward Sloman

- Directed by: Edward Sloman
- Written by: Henry Leverage
- Starring: William Russell; Charlotte Burton
- Distributed by: Mutual Film
- Release date: December 18, 1916
- Running time: 5 reels
- Country: United States
- Languages: Silent film English intertitles

The Twinkler is a 1916 American silent crime drama film directed by Edward Sloman. The film stars William Russell and Charlotte Burton. The author, Henry Leverage, was incarcerated in Sing Sing for auto theft; that fact was used in the film's marketing. It is a lost film.

== Cast ==
- William Russell as Bob Stephany
- Charlotte Burton as Rose Burke
- Clarence Burton as Boss Corregan
- William A. Carroll as Daddy Burke
- William Tedmarsh
- William Spencer
- Robert Klein
- Orinel Barney
