= Tarzan Trilogy =

2016 novella collection by Thomas Zachek

- Cover of first edition
- Author: Thomas Zachek
- Illustrator: Douglas Klauba
- Cover artist: Joe Jusko
- Language: English
- Series: The Wild Adventures of Tarzan
- Genre: Adventure short stories
- Publisher: Edgar Rice Burroughs, Inc.
- Publication date: 2016
- Publication place: United States
- Media type: Print (paperback)
- Pages: 380 pp.
- ISBN: 978-1-945462-05-4
- Preceded by: Tarzan on the Precipice
- Followed by: Tarzan: The Greystoke Legacy Under Siege

Tarzan Trilogy is a collection of original adventure novellas written by Thomas Zachek featuring Edgar Rice Burroughs's jungle hero Tarzan. It is the third volume in The Wild Adventures of Tarzan, a series of new works authorized, licensed and published by Edgar Rice Burroughs, Inc. It was first published on December 14, 2016, in trade paperback, with a hardcover edition released the next day.

== Summary ==
The book includes three novellas set in the area of Point Station, an English outpost near the Waziri lands of the (fictional) Bolongo River basin during the period 1936–1939, in the run-up to World War II, each involving interlopers intruding on Tazan's African domain, and how he deals with them. The first concerns agents of a pharmaceutical company seeking resources assumed to prolong life, the second intertribal warfare involving archaeologists, and the third Nazi invaders.

== Contents ==
- "1936: Tarzan and the "Fountain of Youth"
- "1937: Tarzan and the Cross of Vengeance"
- "1939: Tarzan the Conqueror"
