= Henry Leverage =

American author (d. 1931)

Whispering Wires readable pdf

The Ice Pilot readable pdf

Henry Leverage (died 1931) was a writer of stories and pulp fiction novels. His storytelling extended to accounts of his own life. Two films were adapted from his writings.

His father was an engineer who invented streetcar technology. Leverage served time in Sing Sing prison and was able to write during his sentence. A prison reformer managed the prison and Leverage wrote about his work. He was editor in chief of the prison newspaper The Star of Hope. He was also known as David Carroll Henry.

He wrote a series of entries on underworld slang for Flynn's Weekly that was later compiled into a book.

His stories were published in Argosy All-Stories and other publications.

Harold Hersey visited him at Sing Sing and Leverage's stories were published in his Gangster Stories. He was also published in Blue Book.

His second novel, The White Cipher involved Scotland Yard and the London underworld. His novel Ice Pilot is about whaling with romance mixed in.

== Writings ==
- The Ice Pilot (1921), frontispiece by Rudolph Tandler
- Whispering Wires (1918), first published in the Saturday Evening Post
- The Purple Limited (1920)
- The Hollow Lens
- The Crimp
- Assignats
- Beyond the wall
- The voice in the fog
- The gray brotherhood
- The white cipher
- Where Dead Men Walk (1920)
- The Phantom Alibi: A Detective Story (1926)
- The Voice in the Fog
- The Shepherd of the Sea
- The Man from Brazil; a mystery comedy drama in 3 acts, along with P. Cruger
- "The Old Clam"
- "The New Warden"

== Filmography ==
- The Twinkler (1916)
- Whispering Wires (1926) adapted by Kate L. McLaurin
