= Operator No. 5 =

American pulp magazine

Operator #5
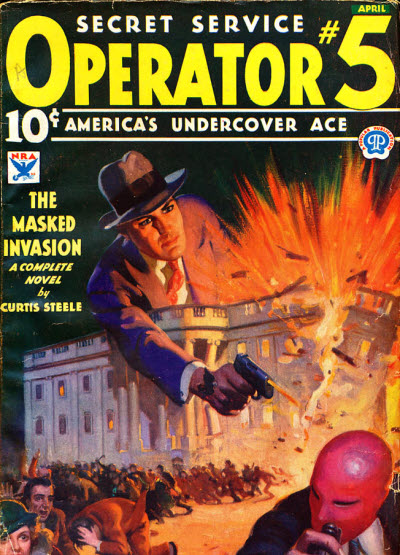
- Cover of the first issue, April 1934.
- Editor: Rogers Terrill
- Frequency: Monthly, then bimonthly
- Publisher: Popular Publications
- Country: United States
- Language: English

Operator #5 was a pulp magazine published between 1934 and 1939.

== Publication history ==
In 1931 Street & Smith, one of the major pulp magazine publishers, launched The Shadow, the first of the hero pulps. It was an immediate success, and other publications quickly copied the format. Henry Steeger, the owner of pulp publisher Popular Publications, launched two hero pulps in 1933 in response: one was G-8 and His Battle Aces, an air-war pulp, and the other was The Spider, about a crime fighter. The Spider was successful, and Steeger decided to add another hero pulp. Steeger's idea, which he had been mulling over for while, was for a hero who would "single-handedly, or almost, save the nation from complete destruction regularly every month". Popular engaged Frederick C. Davis to write the lead novels; Davis was "one of the most competent writers we had", in Steeger's words.

The lead novels featured Operator #5, whose real name was Jimmy Christopher of the Secret Service. The novels were written by Frederick C. Davis until November 1935, then by Emile C. Tepperman until March 1938, and then Wayne Rogers for the remainder of the run; all three used the house name "Curtis Steele" on all their work for Operator #5.

== Contents and reception ==
The plots always involved science fictional ideas such as revival of the dead, sonic rays that could cause panic, rays that damaged the ionosphere, and future war scenarios. Both Tepperman and Rogers embedded their novels in longer story arcs that went on for many issues, involving the invasion of America. In Tepperman's case the invading force was the Purple Empire; in Rogers' case it was the Japanese, and the sequence was unresolved when the magazine was cancelled in 1939, with the Japanese dropping atom bombs on American cities. The short stories that accompanied the lead novel were often spy stories, and included series with repeating characters such as Red Finger and John Vedders, Secret Service Agents whose adventures were chronicled by Arthur Leo Zagat and Frank Gruber, respectively.

Pulp historian Robert Weinberg regards Operator #5 as "the perfect blend of the single-character pulp and the science fiction magazine", praising the early stories by Frederick C. Davis in particular. Pulp historian Wooda Nicholas Carr agrees: "Operator #5 was, and continues to be, regarded as one of the greatest pulp heroes found in the pages behind the gaudy covers that attracted so many".

== Bibliographic details ==
Issue data for Operator #5
| | Jan | Feb | Mar | Apr | May | Jun | Jul | Aug | Sep | Oct | Nov | Dec |
|---|---|---|---|---|---|---|---|---|---|---|---|---|
| 1934 | | | | 1/1 | 1/2 | 1/3 | 1/4 | 2/1 | 2/2 | 2/3 | 2/4 | 3/1 |
| 1935 | 3/2 | 3/3 | 3/4 | 4/1 | 4/2 | 4/3 | 4/4 | 5/1 | 5/2 | 5/3 | 5/4 | 6/1 |
| 1936 | 6/2 | 6/3 | 6/4 | 7/1 | | 7/2 | | 7/3 | | 7/4 | | 8/1 |
| 1937 | 8/1 | 8/2 | 8/3 | 8/4 | 9/1 | | 9/2 | | 9/3 | | 9/4 | |
| 1938 | 10/1 | | 10/2 | | 10/3 | | 10/4 | | 11/5 | | 11/2 | |
| 1939 | 11/3 | | 11/4 | | 12/1 | | 12/2 | | 12/3 | | 12/4 | |
Issues of Operator #5, showing volume and issue number. The editor was Rogers Terrill.

The publisher was Popular Publications of New York; the editor was Rogers Terrill. It began as a monthly; April 1936 was followed by June/July 1936, inaugurating a bimonthly period that ran to the last issue, November/December 1939, except for a brief monthly period: October/November 1936 was followed by December 1936, January and February 1937, and then by March/April 1937. There were 48 issues, in twelve volumes of four issues; the September/October 1938 issue was mislabelled 11/5 instead of 11/1. The page count began at 128 pages, and dropped to 112 pages with the October 1935 issue. The price was 10 cents through the magazine's run.

== Sources ==
- Carr, Wooda Nicholas (1983). "Operator #5". In Cook, Michael L. (ed.). Mystery, Detective, and Espionage Magazines. Westport, Connecticut: Greenwood Press. pp. 402–405. ISBN 0-313-23310-1.
- Weinberg, Robert (1985). "Operator #5". In Tymn, Marshall B.; Ashley, Mike (eds.). Science Fiction, Fantasy and Weird Fiction Magazines. Westport, Connecticut: Greenwood Press. pp. 448–451. ISBN 0-3132-1221-X.
