= Tarzan on the Precipice =

2016 novel by Michael A. Sanford

- Cover of first edition
- Author: Michael A. Sanford
- Illustrator: Will Meugniot
- Cover artist: Will Meugniot
- Language: English
- Series: The Wild Adventures of Tarzan
- Genre: Adventure novel
- Publisher: Edgar Rice Burroughs, Inc.
- Publication date: 2016
- Publication place: United States
- Media type: Print (paperback)
- Pages: iv, 216
- ISBN: 978-1-945462-03-0
- Preceded by: Tarzan: Return to Pal-ul-don
- Followed by: Tarzan Trilogy

Tarzan on the Precipice is a novel written by Michael A. Sanford featuring Edgar Rice Burroughs's jungle hero Tarzan. It is the second volume in The Wild Adventures of Tarzan, a series of new works authorized, licensed and published by Edgar Rice Burroughs, Inc. It was first published in May 2016 in trade paperback, with a hardcover edition released in the following June and an ebook version the following September.

== Plot ==
Set between the novels Tarzan of the Apes and The Return of Tarzan, the story opens after Tarzan hides the revelation of his true identity of Lord Greystoke from Jane Porter, since he believes she will be happier marrying his cousin William Cecil Clayton. Tarzan leaves Wisconsin and heads north into Canada, where he discovers a lost civilization of Vikings.
