= Gangster Stories =

US magazine

Gangster Stories was a controversial pulp magazine of the early 1930s. It featured hardboiled crime fiction that glorified the gun-toting gangsters of the Prohibition era. It was published by Harold Hersey, as part of his Good Story Magazine Company pulp chain. The inaugural issue was dated November 1929; the final issue was dated November 1932. When Hersey sold his assets to another company, Gangster Stories was continued under the title Greater Gangster Stories, under which it lasted through the May 1934 issue.

Gangster Stories (and its companion, Racketeer Stories) quickly came under censorship pressure in New York state, instigated by John S. Sumner of the New York Society for the Suppression of Vice, a state entity empowered to recommend obscenity cases to prosecutorial authorities. Hersey was forced to agree to abide by certain rules, e.g. not letting gangsters triumph over lawmen.

The fiction in Gangster Stories (and Racketeer Stories) constitutes a unique genre. Though properly categorized as crime fiction, the emphasis was on action and gunplay. The stories only tangentially resemble the traditional detective story or mystery. A typical Gangster Stories epic featured rival mobs shooting it out in the streets with Tommy guns.

Perhaps the most popular author in the magazine was Anatole Feldman, with his stories of the Chicago mobster Big Nose Serrano. Playwright Feldman initially based Serrano on the character of Cyrano de Bergerac. The first Big Nose story, "Serrano of the Stockyards" (Gangster Stories, May 1930), roughly followed the plot and characters of the famous play. Thereafter, Serrano evolved into an unlikely crusader against the social ills of the Depression.

Another popular author was former newspaper reporter Margie Harris, a clever writer with an ear for the distinctive vernacular of the mobs. Other authors include Arthur J. Burks, former Sing Sing convict Henry Leverage, C. B. Yorke, Walt S. Dinghall, future Hollywood screenwriter George Bruce, Richard Credicott, and D.B. McCandless.
