= Whispering Wires =

1926 film directed by Albert Ray

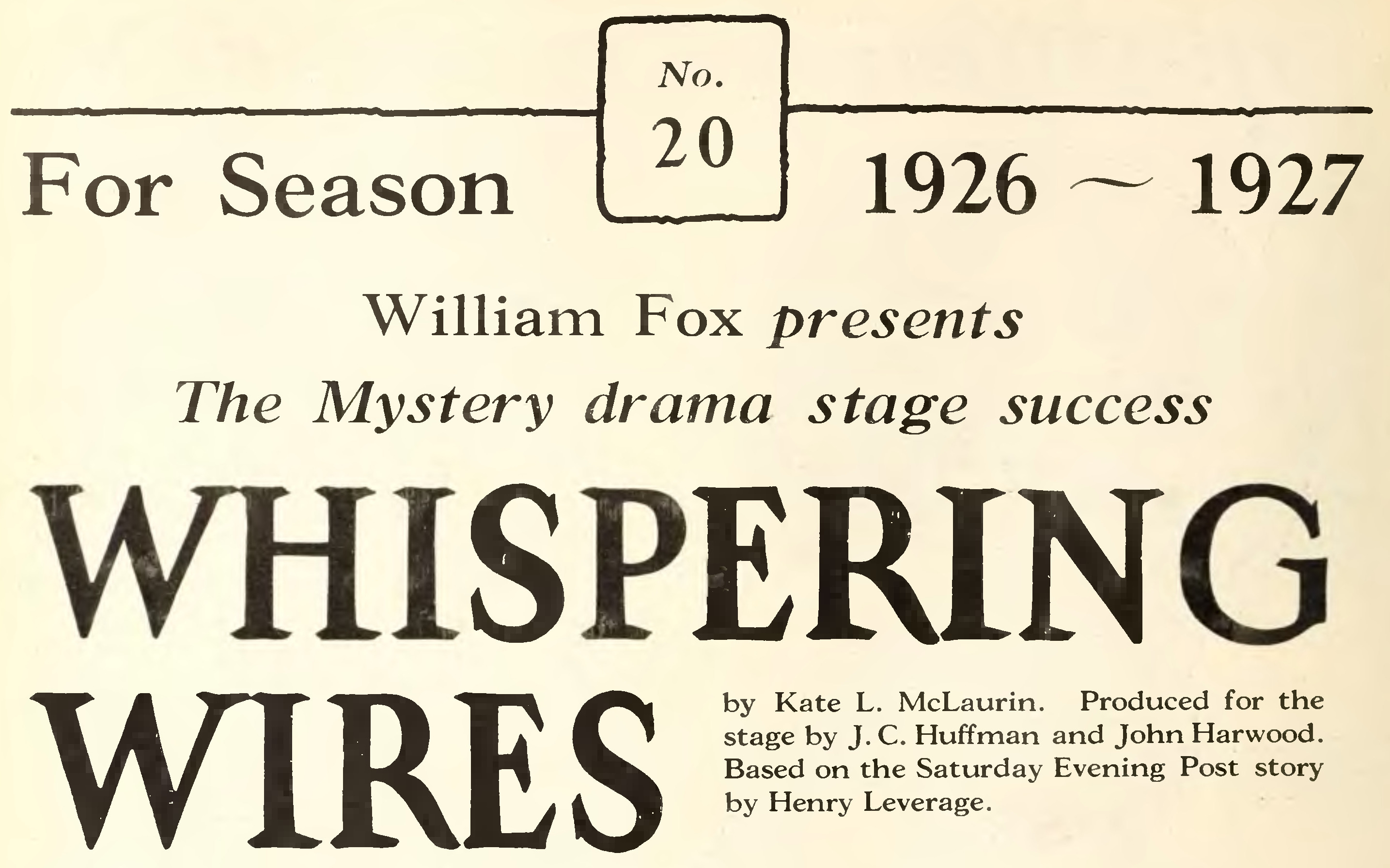
- Directed by: Albert Ray
- Screenplay by: William Conselman; Gordon Rigby
- Based on: Whispering Wires by Henry Leverage
- Starring: Anita Stewart; Edmund Burns; Charles Clary; Otto Matieson; Mack Swain; Arthur Housman
- Cinematography: George Schneiderman
- Production company: Fox Film Corporation
- Distributed by: Fox Film Corporation
- Release date: October 24, 1926
- Running time: 60 minutes
- Country: United States
- Language: English

Whispering Wires is a 1926 American mystery film directed by Albert Ray and written by William Conselman and Gordon Rigby. It is based on the 1918 novel Whispering Wires by Henry Leverage, which was also made into a stage play. The film stars Anita Stewart, Edmund Burns, Charles Clary, Otto Matieson, Mack Swain and Arthur Housman. The film was released on October 24, 1926, by Fox Film Corporation. Little is known about Henry Leverage, the author of the original novel, except that he served prison time in Sing Sing for car theft.

== Plot ==
A person is murdered after receiving a weird phone call, in which someone is heard whispering in a menacing way. Barry McGill sets out to uncover the killer's identity before he can kill again. Barry's girlfriend Doris Stockbridge gets a similar phone call, and tells Barry that she thinks she is to be the killer's next victim. Barry teams up with two fumbling detectives named McCarthy and Cassidy and a bloodhound, and the bloodhound winds up being more effective than the detectives. Barry manages to capture and unmask the killer before he succeeds in murdering Doris. The culprit(s) turns out to be actually two people....an escaped convict and a mad scientist.

== Cast ==
- Anita Stewart as Doris Stockbridge
- Edmund Burns as Barry McGill
- Charles Clary as Montgomery Stockbridge
- Otto Matieson as Bert Norton
- Mack Swain as Cassidy
- Arthur Housman as McCarthy
- Heinie Conklin as Jasper
- Frank Campeau as Andrew Morphy
- Scott Welsh as Triggy Drew
- Mayme Kelso as Ann Cartwright
- Charles Sellon as Tracy Bennett

== Preservation ==
A 35 mm print of the film is held by George Eastman House.
