= Rhythm in the Clouds =

1937 film by John H. Auer

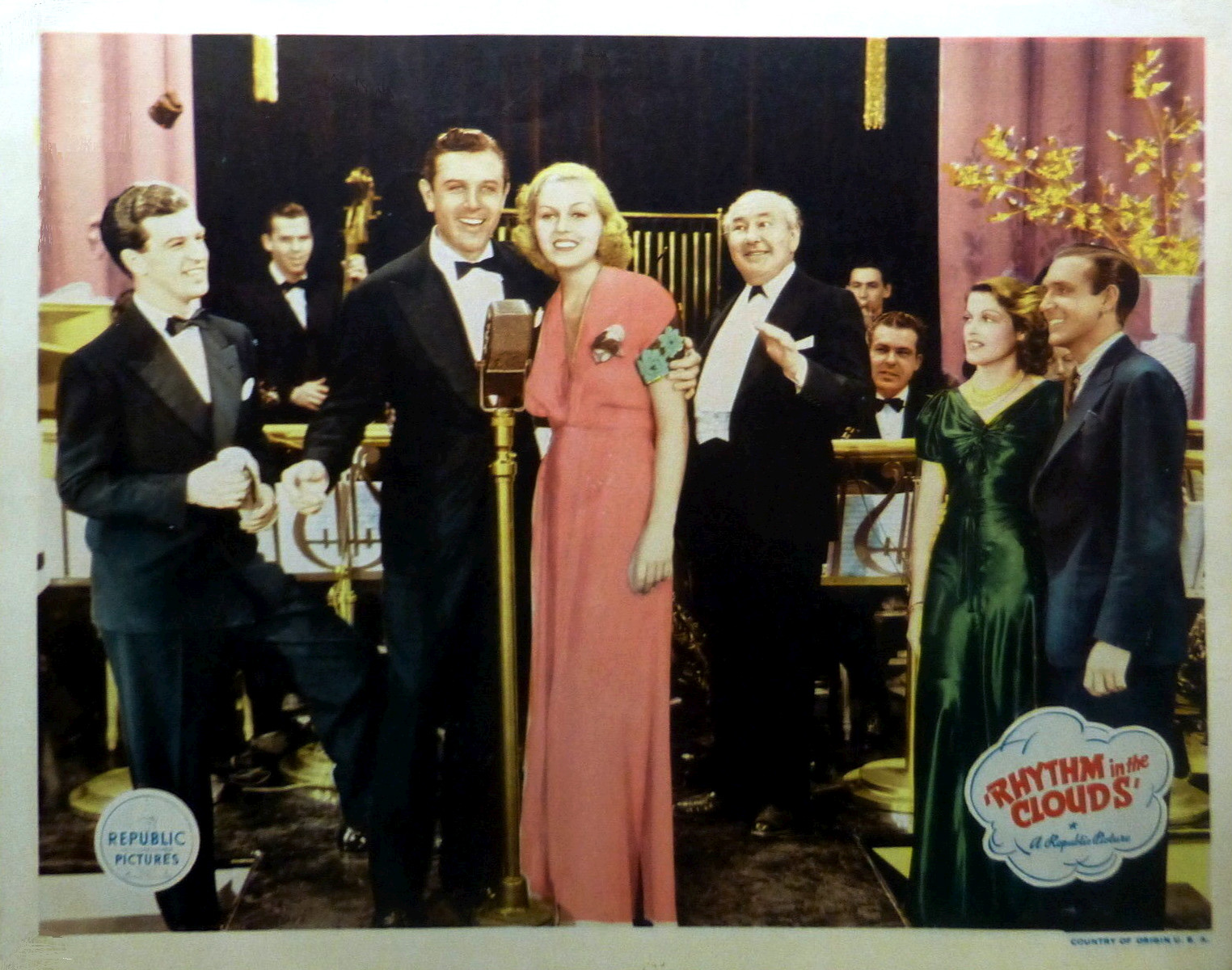
- Lobby card
- Directed by: John H. Auer
- Screenplay by: Olive Cooper; Nathanael West
- Story by: Ray Bond; George Mence
- Produced by: Albert E. Levoy
- Cinematography: Ernest Miller
- Edited by: Edward Mann
- Music by: Alberto Colombo
- Distributed by: Republic Pictures
- Release date: June 21, 1937
- Running time: 62 minutes 53 minutes (edited version)
- Country: United States
- Language: English

Rhythm in the Clouds is a 1937 American film directed by John H. Auer.

== Plot ==
Struggling songwriter Judy Walker gets two hours notice to vacate her room. In frustration, she accidentally spills "ink eraser" on her latest rejection letter, which gives her an idea. She alters the letter, giving herself authorization to use the rejecter's luxurious Park Avenue apartment while he, "uncle" Phil Hale, is away.

Then she receives a phone call from the J. C. Boswell Advertising Co.; Boswell is anxious to hear Hale's new music. She decides to submit her own compositions, including "Mad Symphony", adding Hale's name as co-composer. Luigi, Boswell's musical evaluator, does not like her work, but dissatisfied client Maggie Conway does (for her cosmetics-promoting radio show). Boswell's longsuffering assistant, Clyde Lyons, suggests Bob McKay write the lyrics and sing as well. Conway loves the idea, but that presents a problem: he and Hale hate each other (over a woman).

Lyons sees McKay. He is not interested at first, but the music changes his mind. Lyons also learns that McKay is feuding with the unseen next-door neighbor, furious that she is making so much noise. Lyons knows that neighbor is Walker, so he tries to keep them apart. He fails, but they do not realize they are neighbors, and they are attracted to each other.

For the female singer, Lyons suggests Dorothy Day. Conway likes his idea, but after she leaves, Boswell is furious. The woman that McKay and Hale fought over is Day, who is now Hale's fiancée. Fortunately, with Luigi's help, Lyons persuades her to take the job, lying and saying that Hale and McKay have resolved their differences.

When Walker and McKay find out they are the hated neighbors, their budding romance comes to an abrupt end. Further complications ensue when Lyons gets Hale to return early. When he finds out what Walker has done, Hale is determined to denounce her on the first radio performance, but McKay fixes everything and reconciles with Walker.

== Cast ==
- Patricia Ellis as Judy Walker
- Warren Hull as Bob McKay
- William Newell as Clyde Lyons
- Richard Carle as J. C. Boswell
- Zeffie Tilbury as Maggie Conway, the Duchess de Lovely
- Charles Judels as Luigi Fernando
- Robert Paige as Phil Hale (billed as David Carlyle)
- Joyce Compton as Amy Lou
- Suzanne Kaaren as Dorothy Day
- Esther Howard as Mrs. Madigan
- Eddie Parker as Baxter (as Ed Parker)
- James C. Morton as Cop
- Rolfe Sedan as Victor
- Richard Beach as Ben Graham
- Ranny Weeks as Radio Announcer

== Soundtrack ==
- Warren Hull - "Don't Ever Change" (Written by Walter Hirsch and Lou Handman)
- Suzanne Kaaren - "Hawaiian Hospitality" (Written by Harry Owens and Ray Kinney)
- Suzanne Kaaren and Warren Hull - "Two Hearts are Dancing" (Written by Walter Hirsch and Lou Handman)
- Hull and Patricia Ellis - "Two Hearts are Dancing"
- Patricia Ellis - "Mad Symphony"

== Reception ==
TV Guide rated Rhythm in the Clouds 2/5 stars and called it a "zesty little picture" that has too few songs to be called a musical.
