= Anatole Feldman =

American writer

- Born: 1901
- Died: 1972 (aged 70–71)
- Occupation: pulp magazine writer
- Notable work: Gangster Stories; Racketeer Stories; Gangland Stories; Big Nose Serrano; Far East Adventure Stories
- Spouse: Hedwig Langer

Anatole France Feldman (1901–1972) is primarily known as a pulp magazine writer from the late-1920s to the late-1930s. He specialized in gangland fiction, appearing primarily in Harold Hersey's gang pulps, Gangster Stories, Racketeer Stories, and Gangland Stories. He also appeared in the rival magazines, Gun Molls and The Underworld.

His best-known creation is Chicago gangster Big Nose Serrano. Big Nose began as a pastiche of the 1897 Edmond Rostand play, Cyrano de Bergerac. Serrano's homely nose made him an unlikely romantic hero who thus composed love poetry for a better-looking associate. The plot and characters of the first Big Nose story, "Serrano of the Stockyards" (Gangster Stories, May 1930), roughly follow the corresponding elements in the play. Serrano's overwhelming popularity with readers brought him back for further adventures. The stories are unrelentingly violent, and often intentionally amusing, providing a unique fictional take on Chicago's gangland and the latter years of Prohibition. Feldman ended up publishing twelve of the Serrano adventures from 1930 to 1935 in Gangster Stories, Greater Gangster Stories, and The Gang Magazine. As the series progressed, the Cyrano angle was dropped, and Serrano became an unlikely crusader against the social ills of the Depression, albeit applying the gangster's methods of violence, kidnapping, and murder to the problems.

He stirred up a lot of controversy with the readers of Gangster Stories, with his novelette "Gangsters vs. Gobs," a story that improbably pitted the underworld against the Navy. The controversy filled the letters column for several issues.

Feldman also wrote under a number of pennames, including Tony Fields, A.F. Fields, and similar derivations. In 1930–31, he co-edited the short-lived adventure pulp, Far East Adventure Stories. Writing under a Standard Magazines house name, he authored some of the lead novels in The Phantom Detective.

He was married to fellow pulp-writer Hedwig Langer, who published under the names H.C. Langer and Beech Allen. In the 1940s, they co-wrote plays. Feldman's first performed play had been The Red Thirst in 1920.

In the 1940s, Feldman edited comic books for Hillman. Rocket Comics and Miracle Comics. Later that year he switched to editing true-crime and true confessions magazines for Hillman.
