= Tarzan: Return to Pal-ul-don =

2015 novel by Will Murray

- Cover of first edition
- Author: Will Murray
- Cover artist: Joe DeVito
- Language: English
- Series: The Wild Adventures of Tarzan
- Genre: Adventure novel
- Publisher: Altus Press
- Publication date: 2015
- Publication place: United States
- Media type: Print (paperback)
- Pages: 373
- ISBN: 978-1-61827-209-6
- Followed by: Tarzan on the Precipice

Tarzan: Return to Pal-ul-don is a novel written by Will Murray featuring Edgar Rice Burroughs's jungle hero Tarzan. It is the first volume in The Wild Adventures of Tarzan, a series of new works authorized and licensed by Edgar Rice Burroughs, Inc. It was first published by Altus Press in June 2015 in trade paperback and ebook.

The book is a sequel to Burroughs's novel Tarzan the Terrible, in which the Ape Man visits the hidden valley of Pal-ul-don, a Jurassic Park-like area in Africa, during World War I.

== Plot ==
During World War II, Tarzan reverts to his identity of John Clayton, Lord Greystoke, and resumes his military career as a pilot for the RAF. Flying a P-40 Tomahawk, Clayton is sent to rescue a missing British Military Intelligence officer, code-named Ilex. When his plane is brought down by a pteranodon over Pal-ul-don, his adventure returns him to the lost land, where he befriends the elephant Torn Ear and confronts the mysterious Turtle People. Eventually he even finds and recovers Ilex.
