= Tarzan: The Greystoke Legacy Under Siege =

2017 novel by Ralph N. Laughlin and Ann E. Johnson

Tarzan: the Greystoke Legacy Under Siege
- Cover of first edition
- Author: Ralph N. Laughlin, Ann E. Johnson
- Illustrator: Mike Grell
- Cover artist: Tom Gianni
- Language: English
- Series: The Wild Adventures of Tarzan
- Genre: Adventure novel
- Publisher: Edgar Rice Burroughs, Inc.
- Publication date: 2017
- Publication place: United States
- Media type: Print (paperback)
- Pages: 330
- ISBN: 978-1-945462-07-8
- Preceded by: Tarzan Trilogy

Tarzan: the Greystoke Legacy Under Siege is a novel written by Ralph N. Laughlin and Ann E. Johnson featuring Edgar Rice Burroughs's jungle hero Tarzan. It is the fourth volume in The Wild Adventures of Tarzan, a series of new works authorized and licensed by Edgar Rice Burroughs, Inc. It was first published by Edgar Rice Burroughs, Inc. in May 2017 in trade paperback, with a hardcover edition following in June of the same year.

== Plot ==
In the 1980s the Greystoke Trust, a worldwide financial conglomerate founded on the fortune amassed by Tarzan from the treasure of the lost city of Opar, is under siege. Jonathan Clayton, fourth-generation heir to the trust, is returning to Africa on business when his plane is shot down and crashes in the jungle. The family compound there has been overrun and pillaged by an unknown mercenary force. Jon's crippled father Jackie, head of the trust, is accused of corrupt practices and put on trial. His grandfather Jack (Korak) is accused of the murder of Dian Fossey, having been the last known person to see her alive. Jon's great-grandparents Tarzan and Jane are missing. As Jon struggles to survive in the wilderness, a plot hatched by an old family enemy enmeshes all four generations of his family, including Tarzan himself, unfolds in locations as diverse as Africa, England, the Himalayas, Paris, Moscow, and Washington, D.C.
