= The Spider's Web (serial) =

1938 film by James W. Horne, Ray Taylor

- Directed by: James W. Horne; Ray Taylor
- Written by: Robert E. Kent (screenplay); George H. Plympton (screenplay); Basil Dickey (screenplay); Martie Ramson (screenplay); Norvell Page (magazine stories)
- Produced by: Irving Briskin; Jack Fier
- Starring: Warren Hull; Iris Meredith; Richard Fiske; Kenne Duncan; Forbes Murray; Don Douglas; Marc Lawrence
- Cinematography: Allen G. Siegler
- Edited by: Richard Fantl
- Music by: Mischa Bakaleinikoff; Sidney Cutner
- Distributed by: Columbia Pictures
- Release date: October 10, 1938
- Running time: 15 chapters
- Country: United States
- Language: English

The Spider's Web is a 1938 Columbia Pictures movie serial based on the popular pulp magazine character The Spider. It was the fifth of the 57 serials released by Columbia.

== Plot ==
"The Octopus," a masked crimelord, is bent on crippling America with a wave of terror. He demands tribute from railroad magnates and other captains of industry. Richard Wentworth (Warren Hull), an amateur criminologist who is friendly with the police and is secretly "The Spider," a masked vigilante, is equally determined to destroy the Octopus and his gang. Pleasant and smiling in civilian life, Wentworth is frequently ruthless as The Spider, using his two .45 semi-automatic pistols against any public enemies who attack him. The Spider uses a knotted rope to swing about his surroundings.

Wentworth also masquerades as affable underworld lowlife Blinky McQuade. Disguised as McQuade, Wentworth can infiltrate gangland as a hired gun or getaway-car driver and keep current on the mob's illegal activities.

The only people who know Wentworth's various identities are his assistants Jackson (Richard Fiske) and Ram Singh (Kenne Duncan), his butler Jenkins (Don Douglas), and his fiancée Nita (Iris Meredith).

== Treatment ==
The Octopus was a pulp villain written by Norvell Page, who also wrote most of The Spider pulp novels. He is garbed completely in white and is only ever seen by his henchmen while sitting in his throne-like chair. Unlike the pulps, where The Spider is dressed in an all-black cape, mask, suit, and wide-brimmed fedora, in the serial he is garbed in a black suit and fedora, but with white web-like markings on his lightweight cape and full face mask. The serial follows the standard formula of fights, shoot-outs, Wentworth's friends being kidnapped at various times and needing to be rescued. Each chapter ends with The Spider or his friends in deep trouble, often about to be killed, but the effect is spoiled by a trailer for the next episode which follows, showing them rescued and continuing to fight the villains. The secret headquarters of The Octopus is found by The Spider in the final chapter; he has unwittingly given himself away to Wentworth and realizing this, Wentworth must now die; but as The Spider, Wentworth is triumphant in the end, unmasking The Octopus and ending his national reign of terror.

During the serial The Spider uses his web line a number of times to get out of trouble. Commissioner Kirk (changed from Kirkpatrick in the pulps) suspects that Wentworth is The Spider during one chapter. The Octopus' gang, like their boss, wear robes when they gather together in his presence. The Octopus ruthlessly executes all who failed him; in case of trouble, The Octopus always uses a false arm and hand, which allowed him to conceal a pistol in his real hand hidden beneath his robes.

== Cast ==
- Warren Hull as The Spider/Maj. Richard Wentworth/Blinky McQuade
- Iris Meredith as Nita Van Sloan
- Richard Fiske as Jackson
- Kenne Duncan as Ram Singh
- Forbes Murray as Commissioner Stanley Kirk
- Don Douglas as Jenkins, butler
- Marc Lawrence as Steve Harmon, henchman
- Lester Dorr as Frank Martin
- Charles C. Wilson as Chase
- John Tyrrell as Grafton, henchman
- Nestor Paiva as Red, henchman
- Eugene Anderson Jr. as Johnnie Sands
- Gordon Hart as J. Mason
- Ann Doran as Mason's secretary
- Paul Whitney as Gray, banker
- Beatrice Curtis as Kate Sands
- Victor Travers as Theater Manager
- Bess Flowers as Myrtle
- Byron Foulger as Allen Roberts
- Dick Curtis as Malloy
- Ernie Adams as Merkel

=== Stunts ===
- Dave O'Brien
- George DeNormand
- Bud Geary
- Tom Steele
- Francis Walker
- Duke York

== Production ==
The Spider's Web was the first serial to be adapted from a pulp magazine. The original pulp magazine stories were too violent for the motion picture production code, but The Spider's Web "did manage to suggest [their] frantic pace". Some changes were made beyond toning down the violence. The Spider's costume, a hood/mask and flowing cape with a spiderweb pattern motif, was more theatrical than either the description or illustrations in the Spider's pulp magazine. Historically, The Spider's early cover appearances depict him dressed in black with a black fedora and domino mask. Beginning with the pulp's sixth issue in 1934, The Spider employed horror makeup consisting of a "fright wig", fangs, a false hooked nose, and a hunchback. Commissioner Kirkpatrick was slightly changed to Commissioner Kirk "for no good reason". The serial release coincided with Superman (comics) and Green Hornet (radio) going nationwide.

The film was produced by Columbia Pictures executive Jack Fier, without screen credit. The screenplay was written by serial scenarists George H. Plympton and Basil Dickey, feature-film writer Robert E. Kent, and newspaperman Martie Ramson, whose hard-boiled short stories were syndicated in 1935 and 1936. The direction was shared by action specialist Ray Taylor and veteran serial director James W. Horne.

== Reception ==
The Spider's Web was wildly successful when first released in 1938; it was the most popular serial of that year, according to a tally published in The Motion Picture Herald and its sister publication The Film Daily, and was such an exhibitor favorite that Columbia used it to launch a series of reissues in 1947. A sequel, The Spider Returns, was released in 1941; of the Spider's Web principal actors, only Warren Hull and Kenne Duncan returned in their original roles for the sequel. The Spider has been noted as an influence on Spider-Man co-creator Stan Lee.

== Chapter titles ==
1. Night of Terror
2. Death Below
3. High Voltage
4. Surrender or Die
5. Shoot to Kill
6. Sealed Lips
7. Shadows of the Night
8. While the City Sleeps
9. Doomed
10. Flaming Danger
11. The Road to Peril
12. The Spider Falls
13. The Manhunt
14. The Double Cross
15. The Octopus Unmasked

_{Source:}

== See also ==
- The Spider Returns (1941)
- List of film serials by year
- List of film serials by studio

Preceded by The Great Adventures of Wild Bill Hickok (1938)	Columbia Serial; The Spider's Web (1938)	Succeeded by Flying G-Men (1939)
