= The Spider Returns =

1941 film by James W. Horne

- Theatrical release poster Chapter 10
- Directed by: James W. Horne
- Written by: Morgan Cox; Lawrence Taylor; John Cutting; Harry L. Fraser; Jesse Duffy; George H. Plympton; Screenplay and history based on the pulp magazine character created by Norvell Page
- Produced by: Larry Darmour
- Starring: Warren Hull; Mary Ainslee; Dave O'Brien; Joseph W. Girard; Kenne Duncan; Corbet Harris
- Cinematography: James S. Brown Jr.
- Edited by: Dwight Caldwell; Earl Turner
- Music by: Lee Zahler
- Distributed by: Columbia Pictures
- Release date: May 9, 1941
- Running time: 15 chapters 300 minutes
- Country: United States
- Language: English

The Spider Returns is a 1941 15-chapter Columbia movie serial based on the pulp magazine character The Spider. It was the fourteenth of the 57 serials released by Columbia and a sequel to their 1938 serial The Spider's Web. The first episode runs 32 minutes, while the other 14 are approximately 17 minutes each.

== Plot ==
Amateur criminologist Richard Wentworth, once the notorious masked vigilante The Spider, brings his former alter ego out of retirement to help his old friend, police commissioner Kirk, battle a dangerous, power-hungry maniac called the Gargoyle. This mysterious crime lord and his henchmen threaten the world with acts of sabotage and wholesale murder in an effort to wreck the national security of the United States.

Wentworth's identity is known only to his immediate coterie: his girlfriend Nita, his assistants Jackson and Ram Singh, and his butler Jenkins. Besides his frequent appearances in the Spider costume, Wentworth also masquerades as affable lowlife Blinky McQuade, who is friendly with underworld characters and can get inside knowledge of the Gargoyle's plans.

== Cast ==
- Warren Hull as The Spider / Richard Wentworth / Blinky McQuade
- Mary Ainslee as Nita Van Sloan
- Dave O'Brien as Jackson
- Joseph W. Girard as Commissioner Kirk
- Kenneth Duncan as Ram Singh
- Corbet Harris as McLeod/The Gargoyle
- Bryant Washburn as Westfall
- Charles F. Miller as Mr. Van Sloan
- Anthony Warde as Trigger (henchmen)
- Harry Harvey as Stephan
- Forrest Taylor as Voice of The Gargoyle

== Stunts ==
- Chuck Hamilton
- George Magrill
- Ken Terrell
- Dale Van Sickel

== Production ==
Columbia Pictures used their original serial The Spider's Web as the basic template for many of its early serials: the daring hero and his assistants adopt disguises to battle an exotic, secretive villain and his lawless gang. In The Spider Returns, The Gargoyle wears robes which would not look out of place being worn by Flash Gordon's longtime nemesis Ming the Merciless.

Both serials feature a dramatic wardrobe enhancement to the Spider's original magazine appearance: his simple black cape and head mask are over-printed with a white spider's web pattern and then matched with his usual plain black fedora. This striking addition gave the silver screen Spider an appearance more like that of a traditional superhero, like other pulp and comics heroes being adapted for the era's movie serials; it also made the serial Spider look less like the very popular Street and Smith pulp hero The Shadow, which also had been produced by Columbia and starred Victor Jory.

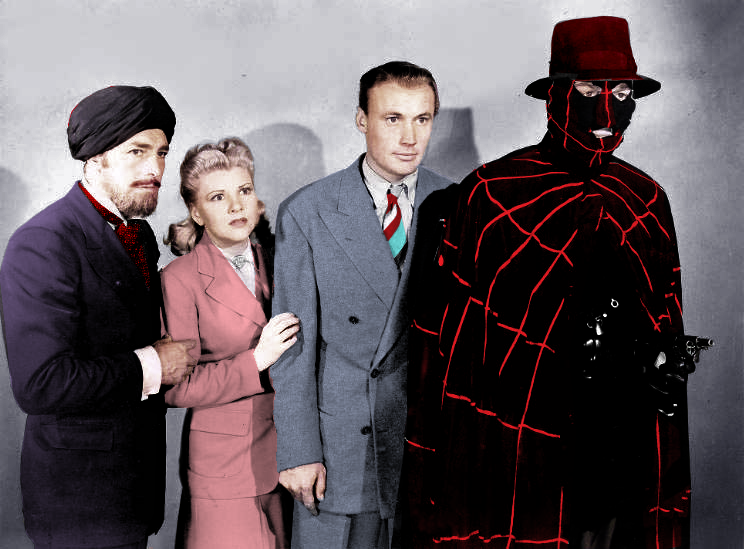
Promotional still for The Spider Returns

James W. Horne, who had co-directed the 1938 Spider serial with Ray Taylor, was in complete charge of the 1941 sequel. By this time, Horne was filling his serials with tongue-in-cheek melodramatics, ludicrous fight scenes (in which the hero fights six or more men, and wins), and ridiculous-looking machines. For this reason, action fans have often dismissed The Spider Returns as an inferior serial, but others consider it one of Horne's best, and a worthy sequel. While The Spider does take on half-a-dozen henchmen at a time, he doesn't always come off the clear winner. Horne keeps the action fairly straight until the last chapter, when he inserts some obvious humor (two henchmen, exhausted from their fistfight, haphazardly swing at each other and then collapse).

The action-filled screenplay employs a typical serial formula of fistfights, gun battles, explosions, and car chases, not forgetting secret weapons, death traps, and hairbreadth escapes as The Gargoyle tries to steal some top secret plans. The Spider serials are unique in that The Spider is also sought by the police with the same vigor that he is sought by criminals. The one real difference between this and the first serial is the police know Wentworth goes undercover at times in disguise as petty criminal Blinky McQuade; they work with him following the leads he uncovers as McQuade.

Dave O'Brien, who had performed The Spider's acrobatic stunts in The Spider's Web, is now a full-fledged second lead playing the role of Wentworth's assistant Jackson. This appearance led to a starring role in Columbia's later serial, Captain Midnight. Only three of the main participants in The Spider's Web (Warren Hull, Kenne Duncan, and Dave O'Brien) are on hand for this sequel.

== Reception ==
The trade reporters apparently hadn't seen The Spider's Web and their reviews did not draw any comparisons, but they seemed to accept Horne's flamboyant approach as standard, exaggerated juvenile action. All reviewers agreed on the constant action, mentioning the frequent car wrecks, explosions, plane crashes, and fistfights. "Typical of the 'blood-and-thunder' variety of serials, with each chapter ending [in] a seemingly impossible situation," noted Showmen's Trade Review. "The pressbook reveals that at the beginning of each chapter the words 'miraculously' and 'luckily' are each repeated, thus giving a slight tipoff on the nature of the story."

Exhibitors remembered the earlier serial and did make comparisons: "This serial was well liked. Not as good as The Spider's Web, but still O.K." When Columbia began reissuing old serials in 1947, The Spider's Web and The Spider Returns were the first two to be revived.

== Chapter titles ==
1. The Stolen Plans
2. The Fatal Time-Bomb
3. The Secret Meeting
4. The Smoke Dream
5. The Gargoyle's Trail
6. The X-Ray Eye
7. The Radio Boomerang
8. The Mysterious Message
9. The Cup of Doom
10. The X-Ray Belt
11. Lips Sealed by Murder
12. A Money Bomb
13. Almost a Confession
14. Suspicious Telegrams
15. The Payoff

_{Source:}

== Distribution ==
Although the serial was not released in the UK, a feature version of about 80 minutes running time did appear there in 1943.

== See also ==
- List of film serials by year
- List of film serials by studio

| Preceded by White Eagle (1941) | Columbia Serial; The Spider Returns (1941) | Succeeded by The Iron Claw (1941) |
