= Rogers Terrill =

American pulp magazine editor

Rogers Terrill (September 21, 1900 - March 1, 1963) was a pulp magazine editor, author, and literary agent. He attended Columbia University and then worked as an actuary. He began selling fiction to the pulp magazines in his early twenties, and in about 1926 he was hired by Fiction House. He was the editor of Wings, Action Stories, and Fight Stories, among other titles, and moved to Popular Publications in 1931 when Fiction House temporarily ceased operations. He remained with Popular until the end of the 1940s, and then became a literary agent. Pulp magazine historian Robert Kenneth Jones describes him as a very successful editor, comparing him to Leo Margulies, a competitor of Popular's at Thrilling Publications, and pulp author Wyatt Blassingame described him as one of the best pulp editors.

He was reputed to particularly hate plagiarism, and Jones relates that an author who submitted to Terrill, as his own work, a story that Terrill himself had written fifteen years earlier, was invited to the publisher's office. According to Jones, "he left Terrill's office practically on his hands and knees".

== Sources ==
- Anonymous (June 14, 1948). "The Golden Fleece". Newsweek. 31 (24): 61.
- Jones, Robert Kenneth (1975). The Shudder Pulps. West Linn, Oregon: FAX Collector's Editions. ISBN 0-913960-04-7.
