= Harold Hersey =

American magazine editor and publisher (1893–1956)

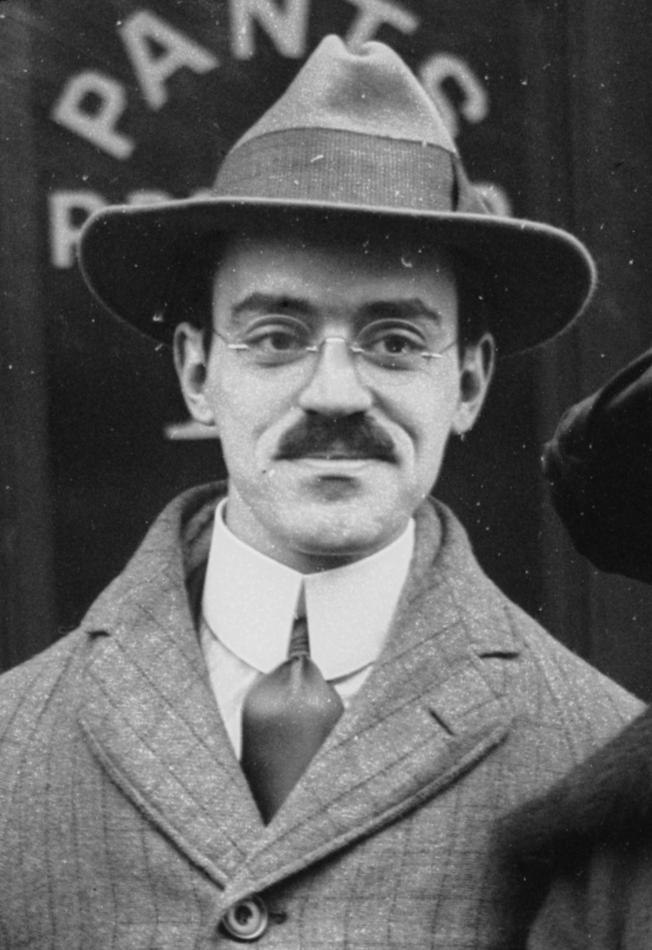
Hersey in 1917

Harold Brainerd Hersey (April 11, 1893 – March 1956) was an American pulp editor and publisher, publishing several volumes of poetry. His pulp industry observations were published in hardback as Pulpwood Editor (1937).

== Early life ==
Hersey was born on April 11, 1893, in Montana to Augustine Haynes "Doc" Hersey, a newspaper reporter and publisher. The family moved to Washington, D.C., in the late 1890s. While Mrs. Hersey and two daughters stayed at home, Doc took Harold with him on globe-trotting reportorial assignments. They visited many places in North America. In 1904–05, they traveled to the Far East for the Russo-Japanese War. The pair traveled extensively in eastern Asia. Doc died in D.C. in 1907, leaving Harold with his mother and sisters.

Hersey worked at the Library of Congress for eight years while getting a degree from George Washington University at night. About 1914, he married Merle Williams; they had one child, a daughter Dorothy, Harold Hersey's only offspring. The marriage was brief. (Merle W. Hersey later moved to New York and edited a succession of sex-oriented "girly pulps" from about 1925–36.)

Hersey moved to Greenwich Village, New York, and helped Margaret Sanger launch her journal Birth Control Review. He met Fulton Oursler. In 1917, Hersey teamed up with Arthur Moss to publish The Quill, a literary and satire magazine. He corresponded with T. Atkinson Jenkins, and Ezra Pound. He was secretary to the Author's League, and supported Theodore Dreiser in his Genius censorship fight. He visited author Henry Leverage in Sing Sing.

== Mid life ==
During World War I, Hersey was a lieutenant in public relations, but never went overseas. Several articles on military matters were published in Scribner's.

Hersey was editor of Minaret magazine in Washington, D. C., with Shaemus O. Sheele, and Herbert Bruncken. He got his first commercial publishing job with publisher Street & Smith in 1919 editing the legendary pulp The Thrill Book. Hersey was fired (or resigned) after 8 of the 16 issues. It is often cited as the first all-fantasy pulp, but in actuality it blended straight drama, adventure, sea stories, mysteries, etc., while also featuring a bit of fantasy.

After leaving Street & Smith, Hersey immediately joined new pulp publisher, Clayton Publications in 1919, as a title editor, feature writer and later group editor for several of the Clayton magazines. Hersey is credited with creating Ranch Romances, the first western-romance hybrid. Ranch Romances was one of the last pulps to cease publication, lasting into the early '70s.

== Magazine publishers ==
After Clayton, Hersey had stints working for Bernarr Macfadden, briefly replacing Fulton Oursler as Supervising Editor of the Macfadden magazines (1927), and the Eastern Distributing Company. In late 1928, Hersey with money fronted by a distributor started his own pulp chain, Magazine Publishers, also known as The Hersey Magazines. The covers used a swastika logo before the company's acquisition. Titles included The Dragnet Magazine, Sky Birds, Fire Fighters, and The Underworld Magazine. Some unknown disagreement with his co-founders/backers resulted in Hersey leaving the company in mid-1929. Magazine Publishers, with former Dell editor Aron Wyn at the helm, turned into the chain known as the Ace Group.

== Good Story Magazine Company ==
Hersey founded another pulp chain, Good Story Magazine Company, with financial backing from Macfadden. Good Story's Gangster Stories was an immediate hit. Within a few months, a dozen titles had been issued, including some now-rare one-shots like Thrills of the Jungle and Love and War Stories. With the issue of February 1930, another gang pulp, Racketeer Stories, was introduced. The violence and lawlessness of the two gang pulps provoked outrage. Hersey was threatened with prosecution in the state of New York. The crisis passed, and the gang pulps remained the mainstay of Hersey's chain into 1932. Other Good Story pulps include Prison Stories, Murder Stories, and Miracle Science and Fantasy Stories.

Hersey bought the company outright in late 1931, after Macfadden withdrew financing. Hersey went forward as an independent. From then on, the pulps were published by Headquarters, Blue Band, and other imprints. However, the company failed in 1932 and Hersey sold his holdings.

Throughout the '30s, Hersey continued to test the market with new magazines. He was editor-in-chief on a string of novelty magazines for H-K Publications (also known as the Hardy-Kelly Group) from 1941 forward.

== Works ==
- Hersey, Harold (1917). The singing flame. R. C. Penfield.
- "The Soldier's Idea of "The Folks Back Home"". Scribner's Magazine. Charles Scribner's Sons. 1918.
- Gestures in Ivory: 1919 Britton Publishing Co., New York
- Poetry: Rare and Collectible: 1923 Privately printed
- Night, with illustrations by Elliott Dold, Personal Books Inc., New York, 1923.
- Hersey, Harold (1926). Singing Rawhide: A book of Western Ballads. George H. Doran Company. A collection of 21 ballads illustrated by Jerry Delano
- Pulpwood Editor (1937).
- Margaret Sanger: The Biography of the Birth Control Pioneer, New York 1938
- Hersey, Harold (2005). More G.I. Laughs: Real Army Humor. Kessinger Publishing. ISBN 978-1-4179-9563-9.
