= Norvell W. Page =

American novelist

- Born: Norvell Wordsworth Page; July 6, 1904; Richmond, Virginia, US
- Died: August 14, 1961 (aged 57)
- Occupations: Writer; journalist; editor; intelligence worker

Norvell Wordsworth Page (July 6, 1904 – August 14, 1961) was an American pulp fiction writer, journalist and editor who later became a government intelligence worker. He is best known as the prolific writer of The Spider pulp magazine novels (1933–1943).

== Early life ==
He was born in Virginia, the son of Charles Wordsworth Page (1880–1947) and Estlie Isabelle Bethel Page (1880–1946). The name Norvell came from his maternal grandmother Elvira Russell Norvell Page.

== Career ==
Between 1924 and 1934 Page worked for the Cincinnati Post, the Norfolk Virginian-Pilot, the New York Times, the New York Herald Tribune, and the New York World-Telegram.

Page spent 12 years as a newspaperman, doing many dirty jobs and seeing many corpses in the morgues. When he did start writing, it was western stories, a subject he knew nothing about, but they sold. Finally the editor who bought the stories suggested he write about something he knew, like gangsters. One of Page's earliest stories was a mystery story, "The Devil Muscles In", written for the November 1930 issue of Detective-Dragnet Magazine, as by N. Wooten Page. In October 1933, Popular Publications launched The Spider magazine, about the titular hero. Popular hoped The Spider would imitate the enormous success of Street & Smith's The Shadow. Page wrote a backup story in the first issue of The Spider pulp, "Murder Undercover", and by the third issue was writing the main Spider stories. This continued with great success till he seemed to have a nervous breakdown while writing "the Living Pharaoh" serial and took a nine-month break from writing before returning to writing relatively tame stories about G-Men (in Ace G-Man Stories) and detective stories.

He is best known as the author of the majority of the adventures of that ruthless vigilante hero The Spider, which he and a handful of other writers wrote under the house name of Grant Stockbridge. The Spider was a crime-fighter in the tradition of The Shadow, wanted by the law for executing his criminal antagonists, and prefigured later comic book superheroes like Batman. Page's innovations to the series included a hideous disguise for the hero and a succession of super-scientific menaces for him to combat. One of these, involving an invasion of giant robots, was copied by an early Superman story and helped inspire the movie Sky Captain and the World of Tomorrow.

He also contributed to other pulp series, including The Black Bat and The Phantom Detective, and supplied scripts for the radio programs based on the characters he wrote, science fiction and two early sword and sorcery fantasy novels under forms of his real name, Norvel Page and Norvell W. Page. His 1940 Unknown novel But Without Horns is considered an early classic explication of the superman theme. Under the pen name of N. Wooten Poge, Page wrote the adventures of Bill Carter for Spicy Detective Stories. His works only saw magazine publication during his lifetime, but his fantasies and some of the Spider novels were later reprinted as paperbacks.

The setting of Page's sword and sorcery novels is central Asia in the first century A.D., when the legendary Prester John supposedly established a Christian kingdom there. In Page's conception, the man behind the legend was hard-bitten Mediterranean adventurer Hurricane John, or Wan Tengri, a hero in the mold of Robert E. Howard's Conan, though more humorous, verbose, and exaggeratedly omnicompetent as a warrior. He comes close to taking over two cities in the course of his travels, but the series concludes before he establishes his empire. He was featured two stories Flame Winds and Sons of the Bear God. The magic John encounters is unconvincingly rationalized.

Page was elected as president of the American Fiction Guild, serving the year from November 1934 through October 1935.

In 1943 he began working for the US government, including the Atomic Energy Commission, the President's Scientific Research Board, the President's Ten Year Health Program, the two Hoover Commissions, and the President's Materials Policy Commission.

He died of a heart attack on August 14, 1961.

== Bibliography ==
=== The Spider ===
(as Grant Stockbridge)

- Wings of the Black Death (The Spider v. 1, no. 3, Dec. 1933)
- City of Flaming Shadows (The Spider v. 1, no. 4, Jan. 1934)
- Empire of Doom (The Spider v. 2, no. 1, Feb. 1934)
- The Citadel of Hell (The Spider v. 2, no. 2, Mar. 1934)
- Serpent of Destruction (The Spider v. 2, no. 3, Apr. 1934)
- The Mad Horde (The Spider v. 2, no. 4, May 1934)
- Satan's Death Blast (The Spider v. 3, no. 1, Jun. 1934)
- The Corpse Cargo (The Spider v. 3, no. 2, Jul. 1934)
- Prince of the Red Looters (The Spider v. 3, no. 3, Aug. 1934)
- Reign of the Silver Terror (The Spider v. 3, no. 4, Sep. 1934)
- Builders of the Black Empire (The Spider v. 4, no. 1, Oct. 1934)
- Death's Crimson Juggernaut (The Spider v. 4, no. 2, Nov. 1934)
- The Red Death Rain (The Spider v. 4, no. 3, Dec. 1934)
- The City Destroyer (The Spider v. 4, no. 4, Jan. 1935)
- The Pain Emperor (The Spider v. 5, no. 1, Feb. 1935)
- The Flame Master (The Spider v. 5, no. 2, Mar. 1935)
- Slaves of the Crime Master (The Spider v. 5, no. 3, Apr. 1935)
- Reign of the Death Fiddler (The Spider v. 5, no. 4, May. 1935)
- Hordes of the Red Butcher (The Spider v. 6, no. 1, Jun. 1935)
- Dragon Lord of the Underworld (The Spider v. 6, no. 2, Jul. 1935)
- Master of the Death Madness (The Spider v. 6, no. 3, Aug. 1935)
- King of the Red Killers (The Spider v. 6, no. 4, Sep. 1935)
- Overlord of the Damned (The Spider v. 7, no. 1, Oct. 1935)
- Death Reign of the Vampire King (The Spider v. 7, no. 2, Nov. 1935; reprinted in The Spider: Robot Titans of Gotham (Baen Books, June 2007))
- Emperor of the Yellow Death (The Spider v. 7, no. 3, Dec. 1935)
- The Mayor Of Hell (The Spider v. 7, no. 4, Jan. 1936)
- Slaves of the Murder Syndicate (The Spider v. 8, no. 1, Feb. 1936)
- Green Globes of Death (The Spider v. 8, no. 2, Mar. 1936)
- The Cholera King (The Spider v. 8, no. 3, Apr. 1936)
- Slaves of the Dragon (The Spider v. 8, no. 4, May. 1936)
- Legions of Madness (The Spider v. 9, no. 1, Jun. 1936)
- Laboratory of the Damned (The Spider v. 9, no. 2, Jul. 1936)
- Satan's Sightless Legions (The Spider v. 9, no. 3, Aug. 1936)
- The Coming of The Terror (The Spider v. 9, no. 4, Sep. 1936)
- The Devil's Death Dwarfs (The Spider v. 10, no. 1, Oct. 1936)
- The Man Who Ruled in Hell (The Spider v. 12, no. 2, Jul. 1937)
- Machine Guns Over the White House (The Spider v. 12, no. 4, Sep. 1937)
- Master of the Flaming Horde (The Spider v. 13, no. 2, Nov. 1937)
- Legions of the Accursed Light (The Spider v. 13, no. 4, Jan. 1938)
- The Grey Horde Creeps (The Spider v. 14, no. 2, Mar. 1938)
- City of Whispering Death (The Spider v. 14, no. 3, Apr. 1938)
- The Emperor From Hell (The Spider v. 15, no. 2, Jul. 1938)
- The City That Paid to Die (The Spider v. 15, no. 4, Sep. 1938)
- The Spider At Bay (The Spider v. 16, no. 1, Oct. 1938)
- Scourge of the Black Legions (The Spider v. 16, no. 2, Nov. 1938)
- Claws of the Golden Dragon (The Spider v. 16, no. 4, Jan. 1939)
- The Silver Death Rain (The Spider v. 17, no. 2, Mar. 1939)
- King of the Fleshless Legions (The Spider v. 17, no. 4, May. 1939)
- Rule of the Monster Men (The Spider v. 18, no. 1, Jun. 1939)
- The Spider and the Slaves of Hell (The Spider v. 18, no. 2, Jul. 1939)
- The Spider and the Fire God (The Spider v. 18, no. 3, Aug. 1939)
- The Spider and the Eyeless Legions (The Spider v. 19, no. 1, Oct. 1939)
- The Spider and the Faceless One (The Spider v. 19, no. 2, Nov. 1939)
- Satan's Murder Machines (The Spider v. 19, no. 3, Dec. 1939; reprinted in The Spider: Robot Titans of Gotham (Baen Books, June 2007))
- Hell's Sales Manager (The Spider v. 20, no. 1, Feb. 1940)
- Slaves of the Laughing Death (The Spider v. 20, no. 2, Mar. 1940)
- The Spider and the War Emperor (The Spider v. 20, no. 4, May. 1940)
- Judgment of the Damned (The Spider v. 21, no. 1, Jun. 1940)
- Pirates From Hell (The Spider v. 21, no. 3, Aug. 1940)
- The Council of Evil (The Spider v. 22, no. 1, Oct. 1940)
- The Spider and His Hobo Army (The Spider v. 22, no. 2, Nov. 1940)
- The Spider and the Jewels of Hell (The Spider v. 22, no. 3, Dec. 1940)
- Harbour of the Nameless Dead (The Spider v. 22, no. 4, Jan. 1941)
- The Spider and the Slave Doctor (The Spider v. 23, no. 1, Feb. 1941)
- The Spider and the Sons of Satan (The Spider v. 23, no. 2, Mar. 1941)
- Slaves of the Burning Blade (The Spider v. 23, no. 3, Apr. 1941)
- The Devil's Paymaster (The Spider v. 23, no. 4, May. 1941)
- The Benevolent Order of Death (The Spider v. 24, no. 1, Jun. 1941)
- Murder's Black Prince (The Spider v. 24, no. 2, Jul. 1941)
- The Spider and the Scarlet (The Spider v. 24, no. 3, Aug. 1941)
- The Spider and the Deathless One (The Spider v. 24, no. 4, Sep. 1941)
- Satan's Seven Swordsmen (The Spider v. 25, no. 1, Oct. 1941)
- Volunteer Corpse Brigade (The Spider v. 25, no. 2, Nov. 1941)
- The Crime Laboratory (The Spider v. 25, no. 3, Dec. 1941)
- Death and the Spider (The Spider v. 25, no. 4, Jan. 1942)
- Murder's Legionnaires (The Spider v. 26, no. 1, Feb. 1942)
- The Gentleman From Hell (The Spider v. 26, no. 2, Mar. 1942)
- Slaves of the Ring (The Spider v. 26, no. 3, Apr. 1942)
- The Spider and the Death Piper (The Spider v. 26, no. 4, May 1942)
- Revolt of the Underworld (The Spider v. 27, no. 1, Jun. 1942)
- Return of the Racket Kings (The Spider v. 27, no. 2, Jul. 1942)
- Pangs of the Dragon (The Spider v. 27, no. 3, Aug. 1942)
- Hell Rolls on the Highway (The Spider v. 27, no. 4, Sep. 1942)
- Army of the Damned (The Spider v. 28, no. 1, Oct. 1942)
- Zara: Master of Murder (The Spider v. 28, no. 2, Nov. 1942)
- The Spider and the Flame King (The Spider v. 28, no. 3, Dec. 1942)
- The Howling Death (The Spider v. 28, no. 4, Jan. 1943)
- Secret City of Crime (The Spider v. 29, no. 1, Feb. 1943)
- Recruit for the Spider Legion (The Spider v. 29, no. 2, Mar. 1943)
- The Spider and the Man From Hell (The Spider v. 29, no. 3, Jun. 1943)
- The Criminal Horde (The Spider v. 29, no. 4, Aug. 1943)
- The Spider and Hell's Factory (The Spider v. 30, no. 1, Oct. 1943)

=== Hurricane John (Wan Tengri) ===
- Flame Winds (Unknown, June 1939; paperback Berkley 1969)
- Sons of the Bear God (Unknown, Nov. 1939; paperback Berkley 1969)

=== Other ===
- "But Without Horns" (Unknown, June 1940; reprinted in Five Science Fiction Novels, edited by Martin Greenberg (1952), and The Crucible of Power, edited by Martin Greenberg (1953))
- City of Corpses:The Collected Weird Mysteries of Ken Carter. (Mystery Stories). Black Dog Books, 2009.
- Trail of the Snake. (Westerns). Black Dog Books, 2011.

== Adaptations ==
Flame Winds was adapted by Marvel Comics as a three-part Conan story in Conan the Barbarian:

- #32 ("Flame Winds of Lost Khitai", Nov 1973)
- #33 ("Death and Seven Wizards", Dec 1973)
- #34 ("The Temptress in the Tower of Flame", Jan 1974)

as well as a four part adaptation of "Sons of the Bear God" both by writer Roy Thomas

- #109 ("Son of the Bear God", Apr 1980)
- #110 ("Beware the Bear of Heaven", May 1980)
- #111 (" a Cimmerian Against a City", Jun 1980)
- #112 ("Buryat Besieged !", Jul 1980)

== Notes ==
- Will Murray gives a good write up on Page in his foreword for the "G Stands For Glory" Kindle book of Page's detective stories, some of which is used in the main article on this page.
