= Doc Savage =

Fictional character in American pulp magazines during the 1930s and '40s

- Doc Savage Magazine, March 1933, "The Man of Bronze", illustrated by Walter M. Baumhofer.

Publication information
- Publisher: Street & Smith
- First appearance: Doc Savage Magazine #1 (March 1933)
- Created by: Henry W. Ralston; John L. Nanovic; Lester Dent

In-story information
- Full name: Clark Savage Jr.
- Notable aliases: The Man of Bronze
- Abilities: Genius-level intellect Peak physical and mental conditioning Skilled scientist, surgeon, inventor, detective, athlete, and martial artist Photographic memory Master of disguise

Doc Savage is a fictional character of the competent man hero type, who first appeared in American pulp magazines during the 1930s and 1940s. Full name Clark Savage Jr., he is a polymathic scientist, explorer, detective, and warrior who "rights wrongs and punishes evildoers." He was created by publisher Henry W. Ralston and editor John L. Nanovic at Street & Smith Publications, with additional material contributed by the series' main writer, Lester Dent. Doc Savage stories were published under the Kenneth Robeson name. The illustrations were by Walter Baumhofer, Paul Orban, Emery Clarke, Modest Stein, and Robert G. Harris.

The heroic-adventure character would go on to appear in other media, including radio, film, and comic books, with his adventures reprinted for modern-day audiences in a series of paperback books; the paperbacks have sold over 20 million copies by 1979. Into the 21st century, Doc Savage has remained a nostalgic icon in the U.S., referenced in novels and popular culture. Longtime Marvel Comics editor Stan Lee credited Doc Savage as being the forerunner to modern superheroes.

== Publication history ==
Doc Savage Magazine was printed by Street & Smith from March 1933 to the summer of 1949 to capitalize on the success of The Shadow magazine and followed by the original Avenger in September 1939. In all, 181 issues were published in various entries and alternative titles.

Doc Savage became known to a new generation of readers when Bantam Books began reprinting the individual magazine novels in 1964. This time, covers were done by artist James Bama; they featured a bronze-haired, bronze-skinned Doc Savage with an exaggerated widows' peak, usually wearing a torn khaki shirt and under the by-line "Kenneth Robeson". The stories were not reprinted in chronological order as originally published, though they did begin with the first adventure, The Man of Bronze. By 1967, Bantam was publishing once a month until 1990, when all 181 original stories (plus an unpublished novel, The Red Spider) had run their course. Author Will Murray produced seven more Doc Savage novels for Bantam Books from Lester Dent's original outlines. Bantam also published a novel by Philip José Farmer, Escape From Loki (1991), which told the story of how in World War I Doc met the men who would become his five comrades.

Clark Savage Jr. first appeared in March 1933 in the first issue of Doc Savage Magazine. Because of the success of the Shadow, who had his own pulp magazine, the publishers Street & Smith quickly launched this pulp title. Unlike the Shadow, Clark Savage, "Doc" to his friends, had no special powers but was raised from birth by his father and other scientists to become one of the most perfect human beings in terms of strength, intelligence, and physical abilities.

Doc Savage set up base on the 86th floor of a world-famous New York skyscraper (implied, but never outright stated, as the Empire State Building; Phillip José Farmer, in his Doc Savage: His Apocalyptic Life, gives good evidence that this is likely the case). Doc Savage fights against evil with the assistance of the "Fabulous Five".

== Comics, films, pulp magazines ==
Doc Savage has appeared in comics, in a movie, on radio, and as a character in numerous other works. He continues to inspire authors and artists in the realm of fantastic adventure.

Doc Savage Magazine was created by Street & Smith Publications executive Henry Ralston and editor John Nanovic to capitalize on the success of Street & Smith's pulp character The Shadow. Ralston and Nanovic wrote a short premise establishing the broad outlines of the character they envisioned, but Doc Savage was only fully realized by the author chosen to write the series, Lester Dent. Dent wrote most of the 181 original novels, hidden behind the "house name" of Kenneth Robeson. (See List of Doc Savage novels for a complete list of the titles in the original pulp magazine series.)

One Lester Dent biographer hypothesizes that one inspiration for Doc Savage may have been the American military officer and author Richard Henry Savage, who wrote more than 40 books of adventure and mystery stories and lived a dashing and daring life.

The character first appeared on screen in a 1975 film, Doc Savage: The Man of Bronze.

It was announced on May 30, 2016, that Dwayne "The Rock" Johnson would be playing Clark "Doc" Savage, billed as the "World's First Superhero", and the film would be directed by Shane Black with a script by Anthony Bagarozzi and Chuck Mondry. In 2020, the concept was changed from a film to a television show.

== Fictional character biography ==
A team of scientists assembled by his father deliberately trained his mind and body to near-superhuman abilities almost from birth, giving him great strength and endurance, a photographic memory, a mastery of the martial arts, and vast knowledge of the sciences. Doc is also a master of disguise and an excellent imitator of voices. He is a physician, scientist, adventurer, detective, inventor, explorer, researcher, and, as revealed in The Polar Treasure, a musician. Dent described the hero as a mix of Sherlock Holmes' deductive abilities, Tarzan's outstanding physical abilities, Craig Kennedy's scientific education, and Abraham Lincoln's goodness. He also described Doc Savage as manifesting "Christliness." Doc's character and world-view is displayed in his oath, which goes as follows:

Let me strive every moment of my life to make myself better and better, to the best of my ability, that all may profit by it. Let me think of the right and lend all my assistance to those who need it, with no regard for anything but justice. Let me take what comes with a smile, without loss of courage. Let me be considerate of my country, of my fellow citizens and my associates in everything I say and do. Let me do right to all, and wrong no man.

By the third story, Doc already has a reputation as a "superman".

=== Doc Savage's aides ===
Savage is accompanied on his adventures by up to five other regular characters (referred to in the 1975 movie and in marketing materials from the Bantam Books republication as "The Fabulous Five"), all highly accomplished individuals in their own right.

- Lieutenant Colonel Andrew Blodgett "Monk" Mayfair, an industrial chemist. Monk got his nickname from his simian build, notably his long arms, and his covering of red hair. He is in a constant state of "friendly feuding" with "Ham" Brooks. This began when his friend taught him some French words to say to an officer and Monk repeated them, not knowing they were a string of insults. The result was a lengthy stay in the guardhouse.
- Brigadier General Theodore Marley "Ham" Brooks, an accomplished attorney. Ham is considered one of the best-dressed men in the world, and as part of his attire, carries a sword cane whose blade is dipped in a fast-acting anesthetic. His nickname was acquired when Monk, in retaliation for his guardhouse incarceration, framed Brooks on a charge of stealing hams from the commissary. In the only case which Ham ever lost, he was convicted of stealing the hams.
- Colonel John "Renny" Renwick, a construction engineer. Renny is a giant of a man, with "fists like buckets of gristle and bone." His favorite pastime is knocking the panels out of heavy wooden doors. He always wears a look of depression, which deepens the happier he grows. His favorite — and frequently used — expression is "Holy Cow!"
- Major Thomas J. "Long Tom" Roberts, an electrical engineer. "Long Tom" got his nickname from using an antiquated cannon of that nickname in the successful defense of a French village in World War I. Long Tom is a sickly-looking character but fights like a wildcat.
- William Harper "Johnny" Littlejohn, an archaeologist and geologist. Johnny has an impressive vocabulary, never using a small word when a big one could suffice. ("I'll be superamalgamated!" is a favorite expression.) Johnny wears eyeglasses with a magnifying lens over his left eye in early adventures—that eye having been damaged in World War I. Doc later performs corrective surgery that restores Johnny's sight in that eye, but Johnny retains the magnifier as a monocle for use both as a magnifying glass and as a memento.

In later stories, Doc's companions become less important to the plot as the stories focus more on Doc. The "missing" characters are explained as working elsewhere, too busy with their own accomplishments to help. Toward the end of the series, usually only Monk and Ham appear with Doc.

Doc's cousin Patricia "Pat" Savage, who has Doc's bronze skin, golden eyes, and bronze hair, also is along for many of the adventures, despite Doc's best efforts to keep her away from danger. Pat chafes under these restrictions, or indeed any effort to protect her simply because she is female. She is also able to fluster Doc, even as she completely charms Monk and Ham.

=== The 86th Floor ===
Doc's office is on the 86th floor of a New York City skyscraper, implicitly the Empire State Building, reached by Doc's private high-speed elevator. Doc owns a fleet of cars, trucks, aircraft, and boats which he stores at a secret hangar on the Hudson River, under the name The Hidalgo Trading Company, which is linked to his office by a pneumatic-tube system nicknamed the "flea run". He sometimes retreats to his Fortress of Solitude in the Arctic, which pre-dates Superman's similar hideout of the same name. The entire operation is funded with gold from a Central American mine given to him by the local descendants of the Maya people in the first Doc Savage story. (Doc and his assistants learned the little-known Mayan language of this people at the same time, allowing them to communicate privately when others might be listening.)

=== Technology ===
Lester Dent kept current with the scientific developments of his era. While some of Doc's gadgets were simply science fiction many of his 'futuristic' devices were actual inventions, or ideas engineers were attempting to produce. Futuristic devices described in the series include the flying wing, the answering machine, television, automatic transmission, night vision goggles, electromagnetic rail guns, and a hand-held automatic weapon, known variously as the machine pistol, the supermachine pistol, or the rapid-firer. A wide range of ammunition types were used for the machine pistols, including incendiary bullets that smash on contact, coating the target with a high-temperature paste-fed fire, high explosive bullets able to uproot trees, ordinary lead bullets, and the sleep-inducing "mercy bullets". Doc also developed an automated typewriter.

=== Villains ===
Doc's greatest foe, and the only enemy to appear in two of the original pulp stories, was the Russian-born John Sunlight, introduced in October 1938 in the Fortress of Solitude. Early villains in the "super-sagas" were fantastic schemers bent on ruling the world. Later, the magazine was retitled Doc Savage, Science Detective, and Doc dealt with more conventional criminal organizations. The super-saga was revived in 1948 by new editor Daisy Bacon shortly before the final cancellation of the magazine. In a September 20, 1948, letter to Lester Dent, Bacon wrote "As long as we are dropping the science detective and returning to just Doc Savage, I think we should return to a real adventure story..."

A key characteristic of the Doc Savage stories is that the threats, no matter how fantastic, usually have a rational explanation. For example, a giant mountain-walking spider is revealed as a blimp, a scorching death comes from super-charged electric batteries, a "sea angel" is a mechanical construct towed by a submarine, Navy ships sunk by a mysterious force are actually sabotaged, and so on. But Doc Savage also battles invisible killers, a murderous teleporter, and superscientific foes from the center of the Earth.

In earlier stories, some of the criminals captured by Doc receive "a delicate brain operation" to cure their criminal tendencies. These criminals return to society, unaware of their past, to lead productive lives. The operation is mentioned in Truman Capote's novel In Cold Blood, as an older Kansan recalls Doc's "fixing" of the criminals he had caught.

== Lester Dent ==
Lester Dent, the series' principal author, had a mixed regard for his own creations. Though usually protective of his own work, he could be derisive of his pulp output. In interviews, he stated that he harbored no illusions of being a high-quality author of literature; for him, the Doc Savage series was simply a job, a way to earn a living by "churning out reams and reams of sellable crap", never dreaming how his series would catch on. Comics historian Jim Steranko revealed that Dent used a formula to write his Doc Savage stories, so that his heroes were continually, and methodically, getting in and out of trouble. Dent was initially paid $500 per story and this was later increased to $750 during the Great Depression, enabling him to buy a yacht and vacation in the Caribbean.

== Bibliography ==
=== Novels ===
James Bama's covers featuring Steve Holland as the Man of Bronze on many of the Bantam reprints defined the character to a generation of readers.

All of the original stories were reprinted in paperback form by Bantam Books in the 1960s through 1990s. Of the first 67 paperback covers, 62 were painted in extraordinary monochromatic tones and super-realistic detail by James Bama, whose updated vision of Doc Savage with the exaggerated widow's peak captured, at least symbolically, the essence of the Doc Savage novels. The first 96 paperbacks reprinted one of the original novels per book. Actor and model Steve Holland, who had played Flash Gordon in a 1953 television series, was the model for Doc on all the covers. The next 15 paperbacks (consisting of stories 97 through 126 in the Bantam reissue series) were "doubles", reprinting two novels each (these were actually shorter novellas written during paper shortages of World War II). The last of the original novels were reprinted in a numbered series of 13 "omnibus" volumes of four to five stories each. It was one of the few pulp series to be completely reprinted in paperback form.

The Red Spider was a Doc Savage novel written by Dent in April 1948, about the Cold War with the Soviet Union. The story was killed in 1948 by new editor Daisy Bacon, though previous editor William de Grouchy had commissioned it. It was forgotten until 1975, when Doc Savage scholar Will Murray found hints of its existence in the Street & Smith archives. After a two-year search, the carbon manuscript was located among Dent's papers. It finally saw print in July 1979 as Number 95 in Bantam's Doc Savage series.

When the original pulp stories were exhausted, Bantam Books hired Philip José Farmer to pen the tale of how Doc and his men met in World War I. Escape from Loki was published in 1991. It was followed by seven traditional Doc Savage stories written by novelist Will Murray, working from unpublished Lester Dent outlines, beginning with Python Isle. Philip José Farmer had earlier written the book Doc Savage: His Apocalyptic Life in 1973, which described the characters and the stories on the entertaining premise that Doc actually existed and the novels chronicled his exploits in "fictionized" form.

In 2011, Altus Press revived the series with another Murray-Dent posthumous collaboration, The Desert Demons. Nine new novels are planned for the new series The Wild Adventures of Doc Savage. In 2011, Doc Savage: Horror in Gold was published. In 2012, Altus Press published Doc Savage: Death's Dark Domain, Doc Savage: The Forgotten Realm, Doc Savage: The Infernal Buddha and Doc Savage: The Desert Demons. Doc Savage: Skull Island, a crossover with King Kong, was released in 2013. Murray teamed Doc up with another Street & Smith pulp-era hero, The Shadow, in Doc Savage: The Sinister Shadow (2015) and Doc Savage: Empire of Doom (2016).

Sanctum Books, in association with Nostalgia Ventures, began a new series of Doc reprints (starting November 2006), featuring two novels per book, in magazine-sized paperbacks. Several editions came with a choice of the original pulp cover or the covers from the Bantam paperbacks, and most include the original interior artwork, as well as new essays and reprints of other old material. In late 2008, Nostalgia Ventures ended their relationship, and Sanctum Books continued with the reprints on their own.

=== Radio ===
Two Doc Savage radio series were broadcast during the pulp era. The first, in 1934, was a 15-minute serial which ran for 26 episodes. The 1943 series was based not on the pulps, but on the comic book version of the character. No audio exists from either series, although some scripts survived. In 1985, National Public Radio aired The Adventures of Doc Savage, as 13 half-hour episodes, based on the pulps and adapted by Will Murray and Roger Rittner. Daniel Chodos starred as Doc.

=== Comic books ===
==== Golden Age ====
Doug Wildey's cover for Millennium's Doc Savage: The Man of Bronze.

Street & Smith Comics published comic book stories of Doc both in The Shadow comic and his own title. These started with Shadow Comics #1–3 (1940). In May 1940, the character moved to his own book, Doc Savage Comics. Originally, these stories were based on the pulp version, but with Doc Savage Comics #5 (1941), he was turned into a genuine superhero when he crashed in Tibet and was given a blue hood with a sacred ruby in the forehead that deflected bullets and hypnotized anyone who gazed into its mystical red light. These stories had a Doc (now known as "The Invincible") who bore little resemblance to the character in the pulps. This lasted through the end of Doc Savage Comics in 1943 after 20 issues, and briefly with his return to Shadow Comics in vol. 3, #10 (Jan. 1944). He would last until the final issue, vol. 9, #5 (1948), though did not appear in every one. He also appeared in Supersnipe Comics #9 (June 1943).

==== Modern Age ====
Post-Golden Age, there have been several Doc Savage comic books:

- Gold Key Comics—A 1966, one-issue adaptation of The Thousand-Headed Man to tie into the planned movie starring Chuck Connors. Doc resembles Connors on the cover.
- Marvel Comics—In 1972, eight standard color comics with four adaptations of books—The Man of Bronze, Brand of the Werewolf, Death in Silver, and The Monsters—and one giant-size issue of reprints that was promoted as a movie issue. In May 2010, DC Comics reprinted the eight-issue series as a trade paperback. In 1975, the Marvel imprint Curtis Magazines released eight black-and-white magazines as a movie tie-in. These were also collected by DC Comics and reprinted in July 2011 as a trade paperback. All are original stories by Doug Moench, John Buscema, and Tony DeZuniga. The character also teamed up with the Thing in Marvel Two-in-One #21, an important issue that would form the basis of later significant stories like "The Project Pegasus Saga" and "Squadron Supreme: Death of a Universe", and Spider-Man in Giant-Size Spider-Man #3.
- DC Comics—A 1987–1990 four-issue miniseries tryout, then 24 issues and one Annual, mostly written by Mike W. Barr. Original adventures, including a reunion with Doc's Mayan sweetheart/wife Monya and John Sunlight, adventures with Doc's grandson "Chip" Savage, and backstory on Doc's parents and youth. Included a four-issue crossover with DC's then-current run of The Shadow called The Shadow Strikes!. In 2009, DC would publish a special one-shot Doc Savage crossover with Batman written by Brian Azzarello with art by Phil Noto and a cover by J. G. Jones. Other characters involved included the Black Canary, the Avenger, Rima the Jungle Girl, the Spirit, and Doc Savage's group the Fabulous Five. It is a prologue to First Wave, a six-issue miniseries with art by Rags Morales. The First Wave line was then expanded to include a Doc Savage ongoing series written by Paul Malmont, with art by Howard Porter. Malmont only wrote the first four issues, with other authors writing the rest of the series. It ran for 18 issues, with the final issue released only in digital format.
- Millennium Publications published several miniseries and one-shots, including Doc Savage: The Monarch of Armageddon, a four-part miniseries, from 1991 to 1992. Written by Mark Ellis and penciled by Darryl Banks, the treatment "come[s] closest to the original, capturing all the action, humanity, and humor of the original novels". Other miniseries were Doom Dynasty and Devil's Thoughts, the one-shots Pat Savage: Woman of Bronze and Manual of Bronze, and an unfinished two-part adaptation of Repel.
- Dark Horse Comics—In 1995, Dark Horse Comics published two miniseries: a two-issue miniseries The Shadow and Doc Savage: The Case of the Shrieking Skeletons and four-issue miniseries Doc Savage: Curse of the Fire God.
- In December 2013, Dynamite Entertainment began publishing the title Doc Savage: The Man of Bronze, written by Chris Roberson, with art by Bilquis Evely and covers by Alex Ross.

=== Film ===
With the Bantam Books reprints a success, media tie-ins for Doc Savage began immediately. A 1965 house ad for a poster, "The Arch-Enemy of Evil", announces, "Tougher than Tarzan, braver than Bond, Doc is America's newest rage - with teenagers, college students, and the 'in' groups all over the country. And there's a television series and feature motion picture in the future."

==== The Thousand-Headed Man ====
In 1967, a TV Guide article reported talks were underway to have Chuck Connors play Doc Savage in a movie adaptation of The Thousand-Headed Man. Complications with rights killed the project.

==== Doc Savage: The Man of Bronze ====
In 1975, producer and director George Pal produced the action film Doc Savage: The Man of Bronze, starring Ron Ely as Doc Savage. The movie was a critical failure and did poorly at the box office. Several articles and a later interview with Pal suggest the movie's failure had much to do with its loss of funding during filming when the studio changed heads and Pal was forced to cut costs. Nevertheless, Pal, as producer, is generally blamed for using the "high camp" approach in the style of the Batman television series. An original soundtrack for the film was also commissioned, but when Pal lost his funding, he resorted to a patriotic march from John Philip Sousa, which was in the public domain. Science-fiction writer Philip José Farmer tried to get another movie made (there is a notation at the end of the original film that a sequel adapted from the novel Death in Silver featuring the infamous Silver Death's-Heads was in the works, but nothing came of it, despite the drafting of a script for it).

==== Doc Savage: The Arch Enemy of Evil ====
According to the screenplay by Joe Morhaim that was posted on the Internet, as well as other archival and news accounts, Doc Savage: The Arch Enemy of Evil was based very loosely on the October 1934 pulp novel Death in Silver. Doc Savage: The Arch Enemy of Evil would feature a deformed, German-speaking supervillain, whose pet man-eating octopus was a nod to a similar plot element in the September 1937 pulp novel The Feathered Octopus.

In fact, this screenplay was originally intended to be filmed as the first Doc Savage movie. However, producer George Pal commissioned a second script based on the first Doc Savage pulp novel, The Man of Bronze, because he felt the movie-going audience needed more background information about Doc and his origin.

Contemporary news accounts indicated that Doc Savage: The Arch Enemy of Evil had been filmed in the Lake Tahoe area simultaneously with the principal photography for the first Doc Savage film. However, due to the poor reception of the first film, Doc Savage: The Arch Enemy of Evil was never completed or released. In an interview conducted in 2014, while he was filming the television movie Expecting Amish, actor Ron Ely stated unequivocally that "no portion of The Arch Enemy of Evil was ever filmed, concurrently with The Man of Bronze or otherwise. That's a total myth."

Finally, in anticipation of a proposed Doc Savage TV series, George Pal commissioned a two-part teleplay by Alvin Sapinsley based on the May 1935 pulp novel The Secret in the Sky. The teleplay was completed in January 1975, but due to the poor reception of the first Doc Savage film, a pilot was never filmed.

==== Other film adaptations ====
Another screenplay was written by Philip José Farmer based on the January 1936 pulp novel Murder Mirage. It included a potential Wold Newton Universe cross-over involving a meeting between Doc Savage and a retired Sherlock Holmes in 1936. In any case, this screenplay was never filmed. In 1966, the basic premise of Doc Savage's origin was an obvious influence on the Mexican lucha libre film character Mil Mascaras (1966), which was released at the height of the popularity of the Doc Savage paperback book series in the U.S.

In 1999, there was an announcement that a possible remake featuring Arnold Schwarzenegger was in the works, with the involvement of Frank Darabont and Chuck Russell, but it and several other Schwarzenegger projects (Sgt. Rock and an epic about the Crusades) were shelved when Schwarzenegger ran for and was elected Governor of California.

In late 2006, Sam Raimi was rumoured to be making a film involving several Street and Smith pulp heroes, including The Shadow, The Avenger, and Doc Savage. A screenplay was supposedly written by Siavash Farahani but since then, no other news surfaced with regards to this script.

==== Original Film projects ====
Writer/director Shane Black was set to direct a film adaptation for Original Film and Sony Pictures. Black would also co-write the screenplay with Anthony Bagarozzi and Chuck Mondry. The film version will be set in the 1930s and will include the Fabulous Five. Neal H. Moritz will produce. In September 2013, talking about the difficulty in casting the character, Black commented, "He's the perfect physical specimen, people look at him and they are over-awed by the symmetry and perfection he exudes." In June 2014, it was revealed that he wanted Chris Hemsworth for the lead role but Hemsworth was never officially announced or attached to the project.

On May 22, 2016, Black told Thrillist that he would like to make the movie with Dwayne Johnson, stating, "I made a decision that Dwayne is the guy. I would like to do Doc with Dwayne Johnson if we can make that work. It's on the back burner while he's busy." On May 30, 2016, Johnson confirmed on his Instagram account that he will be starring as Savage in the film, also hinting that the character is being dubbed the "World's First Superhero", mentioning that Savage's published appearance pre-dated that of Superman's (who debuted in 1938). Johnson also included the hashtag "#World'sFirstSuperhero". On April 11, 2018, Johnson said he and Black were still eager to do the project, but, "That project had a few issues, not creative issues but more so business affairs issues—where the project once was, who had rights to it, where we were trying to move it to. There was a lot of that, which we're still kind of working through."

On February 19, 2020, it was announced Original Film would, instead, shift development to a television series. The project is a co-production with Sony Pictures Television and Condé Nast Entertainment. In May 2026, Black confirmed the series was still proceeding, with Neal H Moritz producing.
