= List of Doc Savage characters =

Starting with the first Doc Savage story in 1933 and running throughout the pulp adventures, a group of recurring characters appeared either as Doc's supporting cast or antagonists.

== B ==
=== Brigadier General Theodore Marley "Ham" Brooks ===
- First appearance: Doc Savage Magazine #1 (March 1933)
- Created by: Lester Dent

Ham Brooks is one of the characters referred to as "The Fabulous Five", the primary assistants of Doc Savage, and first appears with the full name Theodore Marley Brooks.

The character is presented as a Harvard-educated lawyer, holding the military rank of brigadier general, and known as a dandy. He is shown as always carrying a sword cane with a blade coated with a knock-out chemical.

He is also shown to love fighting with his friend "Monk" Mayfair. This began during World War I when a practical joke landed Monk in a military jail. Ham had taught Monk some insulting French words, presenting them as compliments. Monk used them while speaking to a French general and got locked in the guardhouse. Shortly after that, Ham was framed for stealing a truckload of hams, resulting in his insulting nickname. Ham was able to defend himself, but the fact that he was never able to prove that Monk was behind this has always been a source of irritation for him.

During the story "Dust of Death", an odd ape took a liking to Ham. He kept it due to its similarity to Monk. He named it Chemistry, to infuriate Monk. Monk often calls it "the what-is-it", since it looks to be either an ape, chimpanzee, gorilla, baboon or a mixture.

==== In other media ====
- In the film Doc Savage: The Man of Bronze, he was played by Darrell Zwerling.
- In the 1985 National Public Radio series, he was played by Art Dutch.

== L ==
=== William Harper "Johnny" Littlejohn ===
- First appearance: Doc Savage Magazine #1 (March 1933)
- Created by: Lester Dent

William Littlejohn is one of the characters referred to as "The Fabulous Five", the primary assistants of Doc Savage, and first appears with the full name William Harper Littlejohn.

The character is presented as geologist and archaeologist and referred to as "Professor". Physically he is described as tall, extremely thin, with black hair and a large nose. He wore spectacles with a magnifying lens for use in field work over his left eye, rendered sightless by a war injury. Later, Doc restored his full vision with an operation. Johnny thereafter carried the magnifying glass as a monocle suspended on a black ribbon pinned to his lapel, habitually twirling it idly by its ribbon when puzzled. Despite being shown wearing the monocle over his right (not left) eye in interior illustrations, he never did so in the stories.

Within the novels, it is stated that he first met Doc Savage in a prisoner of war camp during World War I. He is the only one of Doc's aides whose military rank is never mentioned. In the book Escape from Loki by Philip José Farmer, it is stated that Johnny was in Germany in a civilian capacity when the war broke out. He was arrested on not entirely falsified espionage charges.

==== In other media ====
- In the film Doc Savage: The Man of Bronze, he was played by Eldon Quick.
- In the 1985 National Public Radio series, he was played by Kimit Muston.

== M ==
=== Lieutenant Colonel Andrew Blodgett "Monk" Mayfair ===
- First appearance: Doc Savage Magazine #1 (March 1933)
- Created by: Lester Dent

Monk Mayfair is one of the characters referred to as "The Fabulous Five", the primary assistants of Doc Savage, and first appears with the full name Andrew Blodgett Mayfair.

The character is presented as an industrial chemist, holding the military rank of lieutenant colonel, and physically distinct, described as resembling a great ape.

He is shown to love a good brawl, beautiful women, and needling his friend "Ham" Brooks. The latter stretches back to World War I when Monk framed Brooks for stealing hams during the war in retaliation for Ham playing a practical joke on him.

When he maintains his Wall Street laboratory, he often boasts that he has the prettiest secretary in town. A blonde, her name is Lea Aster. She's kidnapped and rescued during the adventure of The Red Skull.

In the story "The Phantom City", Monk purchases an odd-looking pig, described as having long legs, large floppy ears, and sharp teeth, in Bustan for one qirsh. He names it Habeas Corpus in order to further infuriate Ham. The pig accompanies Monk as a pet in later novels.

==== In other media ====
- In the film Doc Savage: The Man of Bronze, he was played by Michael Miller.
- In the 1985 National Public Radio series, he was played by Robert Towers.

== R ==
=== Colonel John "Renny" Renwick ===
- First appearance: Doc Savage Magazine #1 (March 1933)
- Created by: Lester Dent

Renny Renwick is one of the characters referred to as "The Fabulous Five", the primary assistants of Doc Savage, and first appears with the full name John Renwick.

The character is presented as a civil engineer, holding the rank of colonel, and presenting a gloomy demeanor even at his happiest. Physically he is described as massive giant of a man, with enormous fists that he likes to punch through doors.

==== In other media ====
- In the film Doc Savage: The Man of Bronze, he was played by William Lucking.
- In the 1985 National Public Radio series, he was played by Bill Ratner.

=== Major Thomas J. "Long Tom" Roberts ===
- First appearance: Doc Savage Magazine #1 (March 1933)
- Created by: Lester Dent

Long Tom Roberts is one of the characters referred to as "The Fabulous Five", the primary assistants of Doc Savage, and first appears with the full name Thomas J. Roberts.

The character is presented as an electrical engineer, holding the military rank of major, and a pilot. Physically he is described as sickly-looking and awkward with a pale complexion, buck teeth, one enormous gold tooth in front, big ears, and a large forehead. This contrasts with notes in the stories that he rarely became ill and was a proficient fighter.

Within the pulps, it is stated that he and Doc Savage met during World War I. The explanation of his nickname is also given as a result of an event during the war where he help to defend a small European village using an ancient cannon known as a "Long Tom".

==== In other media ====
- In the film Doc Savage: The Man of Bronze, he was played by Paul Gleason.
- In the 1985 National Public Radio series, he was played by Scott McKenna.

== S ==
=== Alex Savage ===
- First appearance: Doc Savage Magazine vol 1, #5 (January 1934)
- Created by: Lester Dent

Alex Savage is the uncle of Doc Savage.

In the novel Brand of the Werewolf, Doc Savage learns that his uncle was murdered in the Canadian Northwest forest. Alex Savage is the father of Patricia Savage.

=== Clark Savage, Sr. ===
- First appearance: Doc Savage Magazine vol 1, #1 (March 1933)
- Created by: Lester Dent

"Captain" Clark Savage Sr. is the father of Doc Savage.

In the debut novel, The Man of Bronze, Doc Savage learns that his father was murdered in Central America. Clark Savage assembled a team of scientists to train the mind and body of his son to near-superhuman abilities almost from birth, granting Doc Savage great strength and endurance, a photographic memory, a mastery of the martial arts, and vast knowledge of the sciences.

=== Patricia "Pat" Savage ===
- First appearance: Doc Savage Magazine vol 2, #5 (January 1934)
- Created by: Lester Dent

Pat Savage is a recurring supporting character in the Doc Savage pulps outside of "The Fabulous Five".

The character is the daughter of Alex Savage, Doc Savage's cousin and only close kin, sharing the bronze hair color and skin tone with him as well as being strikingly beautiful. A police report describes her as, "Five feet seven, slender, nice form, tan, golden eyes, hair sort of like dark copper." She's considerably younger than her famous cousin, being "about eighteen" in 1934. The stories note she's an accomplished marksman, pilot, and hand-to-hand combatant.

She is also shown to love Doc's adventures to the point of joining them on occasion. With the onset of World War II and Doc's aides often tied up with war projects, Doc began to call on Pat's help, much like Rosie the Riveter stepped up to male roles. In I Died Yesterday, she is the main character as the story is told as a first-person narrative.

She carries a Colt Frontier Six-Shooter with a fanning spur as her signature weapon. The gun is an important plot element in Violent Night. A disguised Hitler thinks he's left his fingerprints on the gun, so Nazis keep trying to steal it.

In her last pulp appearance, I Died Yesterday, Pat relates, "I turned and walked away, wondering if the miracle that Doc had been working for had happened, and I was cured of my liking for adventure, or whether it was just that I was still scared. I didn't feel scared - which was what worried me."

Pat Savage was the title character in a novel by Will Murray, Pat Savage: Six Scarlet Scorpions.

Pat has also appeared or been mentioned in stories and novels that have been based on the pulps. These include:

- Doc Savage: His Apocalyptic Life by Philip José Farmer.
- Lin Carter's Prince Zarkon novels.
- Doc Savage comics published by DC Comics, Millennium Publications, Marvel Comics, and Moonstone Books.

==== In other media ====
- In the 1985 National Public Radio series, she was played by Robin Riker.

=== Stormalong Savage ===
- First appearance: Doc Savage: Skull Island (February 2013)
- Created by: Will Murray

Stormalong Savage is the grandfather of Doc Savage.

Stormalong Savage is a supporting character in the Doc Savage: Skull Island, from the officially sanctioned book series, The All-New Wild Adventures of Doc Savage. A young Doc and his father search for their patriarch, Stormalong Savage, a merchant mariner, who they believe to be lost on the mysterious Skull Island.

Stormalong is described as being seven feet tall, with yellow orbs for eyes. He is not to be confused with Alfred Bulltop Stormalong whose legend is also mentioned in the novel.

=== John Sunlight ===
- First appearance: Doc Savage vol 12, #2 (October 1938)
- Created by: Lester Dent

John Sunlight is the only villain to appear in more than one issue of the Doc Savage pulps, first appearing in "Fortress of Solitude" from October 1938 and returning in "The Devil Genghis" from December of the same year.

The character is presented in some respects as Savage's opposite number, mirroring a number of his qualities. He is stronger, more intelligent, and possesses greater emotional control than ordinary people do. And in times of concentration or stress, he emits a low growl subconsciously, very similar to Savage's trilling. He is also an idealist who seeks to end problems such as war, famine, and bigotry by bringing the world under his control.

Sunlight has also appeared in a few of the comic book adaptations of Doc Savage:

- "Sunlight Rising" in Doc Savage #s 11-14 published by DC Comics in 1989.
- "The Monarch of Armageddon" by Mark Ellis and Darryl Banks, published by Millennium Publications in 1991. Set shortly after The Devil Genghis, the story depicts Sunlight's systematic destruction of everything Doc holds dear. In the concluding chapter, Sunlight apparently commits suicide rather than have his life saved by Doc Savage.
- First Wave published by DC Comics.
- Rocketeer: Cargo of Doom published by IDW.
