= Doc Savage: The Man of Bronze =

1975 film by Michael Anderson

- Theatrical release poster by Roger Kastel
- Directed by: Michael Anderson
- Written by: Joe Morhaim; George Pal
- Based on: The Man of Bronze; 1933 novel by Kenneth Robeson
- Produced by: George Pal
- Starring: Ron Ely
- Cinematography: Fred J. Koenekamp
- Edited by: Thomas J. McCarthy
- Music by: Don Black; Frank De Vol; John Philip Sousa
- Production company: Warner Bros. Pictures
- Distributed by: Warner Bros. Pictures
- Release date: June 1975
- Running time: 112 minutes
- Country: United States
- Language: English

Doc Savage: The Man of Bronze is a 1975 American action film starring Ron Ely as pulp hero Doc Savage. This was the last film completed by pioneering science fiction producer George Pal and was directed by Michael Anderson. The movie received mostly negative reviews.

== Plot ==
In 1936, Doc Savage returns to New York City following a visit to his top-secret Arctic hideaway, the Fortress of Solitude. He learns that his father has died under mysterious circumstances while exploring the remote interior of the Central American Republic of Hidalgo. While examining his father's personal papers, Doc finds himself the target of an assassination attempt. Doc Savage chases and corners the sniper on the nearby Eastern Cranmoor Building, but the would-be assassin loses his footing and falls to his death. Examining the body, Doc discovers that his assailant is a Native American with peculiar markings; his fingertips are red, as if dipped in blood, while his chest bears an elaborate tattoo of the ancient Mayan god Kukulkan. Returning to his penthouse headquarters, Doc finds that intruders have destroyed his father's personal papers. Vowing to solve his father's murder, Doc Savage flies to Hidalgo with "The Fabulous Five", his brain trust, at his side.

Waiting for Doc Savage's arrival is the international criminal and smuggler Captain Seas who repeatedly attempts to kill Doc and his friends, culminating in a wild melee on board his yacht, the Seven Seas. Meanwhile, Doc's investigation uncovers that, years ago, Professor Savage received a vast land grant in the unexplored interior of Hidalgo from the Quetzamal, a Mayan tribe that disappeared 500 years ago. However, Don Rubio Gorro of the local government's land office informs Doc that all records to the land transaction are missing. Doc receives unexpected help from Gorro's assistant, Mona Flores, who saw the original papers and offers to lead Doc and his friends to the land claim.

Following clues left by his father, Doc and his friends locate the hidden entrance into the Valley of the Vanished where the lost Quetzamal tribe lives. Doc separates from the group and finds a pool of molten gold. Doc also learns that Captain Seas is using the Quetzamal natives as slave labor to extract the gold for himself. Meanwhile, Seas' men capture Mona and The Fabulous Five, and Seas unleashes the Green Death, the same airborne plague that killed Doc's father and keeps the Quetzamal tribe under his control. Doc overpowers the Captain after a protracted clash of different fighting styles and forces Seas to release his friends, whom Doc then treats with a special antidote. Seeing their leader captured, the Captain's men try to escape with the gold, but exploding dynamite causes the pool of gold to erupt, covering the henchmen, including Don Rubio Gorro, in molten metal. Freed from Captain Seas, Chief Chaac offers the gold and land grant to Doc, who vows: "I promise to continue my father's work ... his ideals. With this limitless wealth at my disposal, I shall be able to devote my life to the cause of justice."

Doc Savage returns to the United States, and at his private rehabilitation center located in Westchester County, New York, Doc subsequently performs acupuncture brain surgery on Captain Seas to cure him of his criminal behavior. Later, during Christmas season, Doc Savage encounters the former supervillain, who is now a bandleader for The Salvation Army, flanked by his former paramours Adriana and Karen. Arriving back at his penthouse headquarters from shopping, Doc hears an urgent message about a new threat that could cost millions of lives, recorded earlier on his telephone answering machine. Doc Savage leaps into action and speeds to his next adventure.

== Cast ==
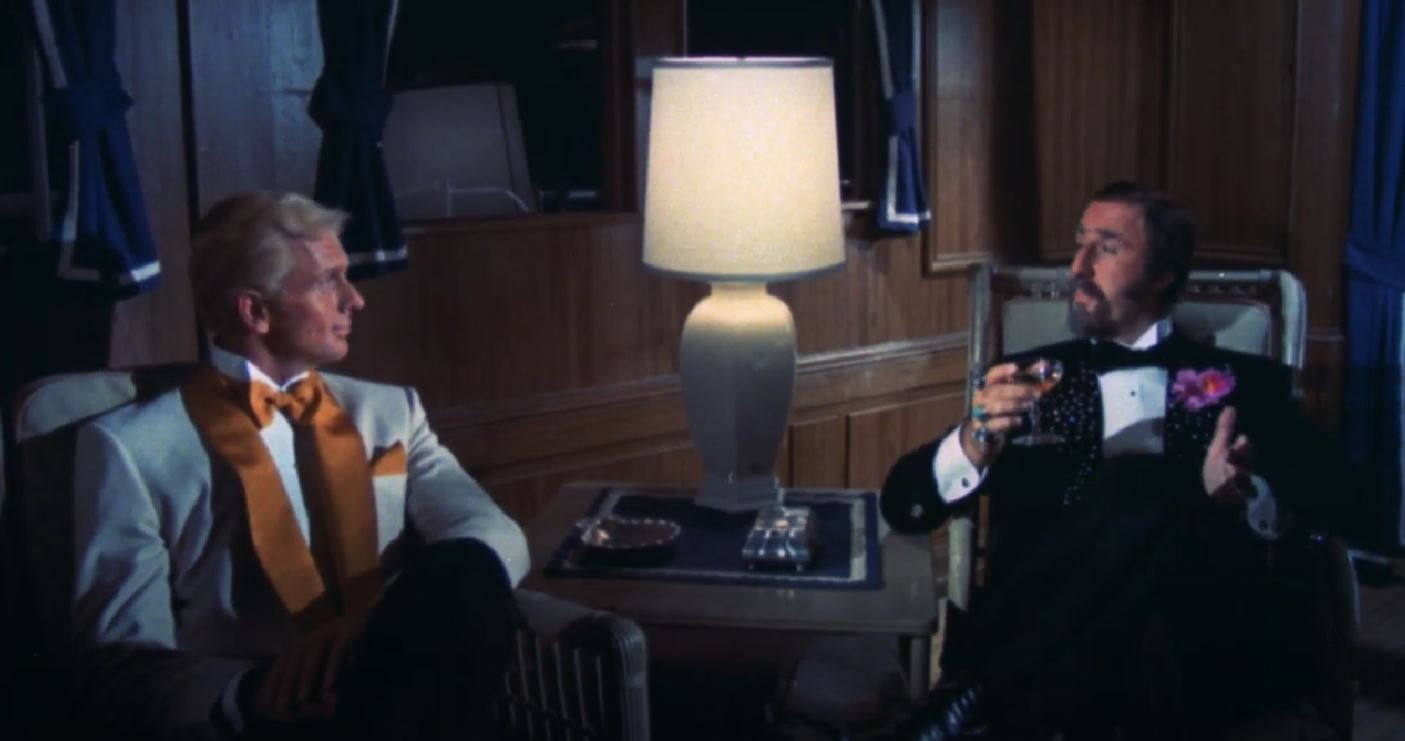
Ron Ely as Doc Savage and Paul Wexler as Captain Seas (l-r)

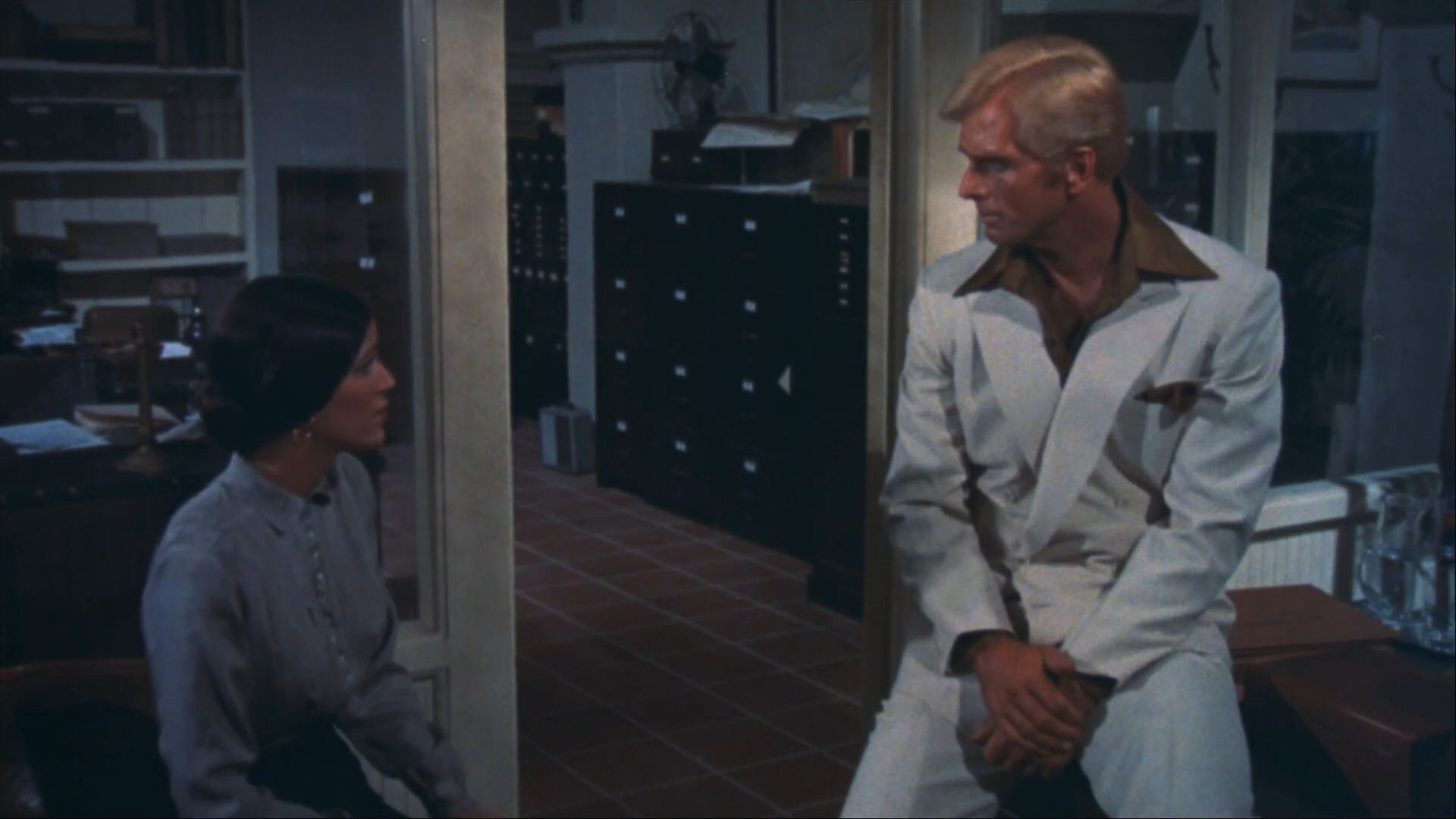
Pamela Hensley and Ron Ely (l-r)

=== Main cast ===
- Ron Ely as Clark "Doc" Savage Jr.
- Paul Gleason as Major Thomas J. Roberts
- William Lucking as Colonel John "Renny" Renwick
- Michael Miller as Lieutenant Colonel Andrew Blodgett "Monk" Mayfair
- Eldon Quick as Professor William Harper "Johnny" Littlejohn
- Darrell Zwerling as Brigadier General Theodore Marley "Ham" Brooks
- Paul Wexler as Captain Seas
- Pamela Hensley as Mona Flores
- Bob Corso as Don Rubio Gorro
- Federico Roberto as El Presidente Don Carlos Avispa
- Janice Heiden as Adriana
- Robyn Hilton as Karen
- Victor Millan as King Chaac

=== Other noteworthy cast ===
- Robert Tessier as Dutchman, one of Captain Seas' henchmen.
- Michael Berryman as Juan Lopez Morales, Hidalgo's chief coroner (film debut).
- Stuntman Dar Robinson as the Mayan would-be assassin.
- Carlos Rivas, who played the renegade Mayan shaman Kulkan, also appeared in episodes "The Ultimate Duel" and "Perils of Tanga" of the 1966 NBC TV series Tarzan starring Ron Ely.
- Grace Stafford, the wife of animation producer Walter Lantz, played an elderly woman who was helped across the street by a Boy Scout near the end of the film. George Pal and Lantz were good friends, and Lantz's most famous creation, Woody Woodpecker, often made a cameo appearance in Pal's films. Ms. Stafford provided the voice for Woody Woodpecker.
- Tony Epper as Ron Ely's stunt double and film stunt coordinator

== Development ==
=== Film rights ===
As co-creator of Doc Savage, author Lester Dent retained the radio, film, and television rights to the character as part of his contract with Street & Smith Publications, publishers of the Doc Savage pulp magazine. Although Dent succeeded in launching a short-lived radio program, he was never able to interest Hollywood in a Doc Savage film. Upon Dent's death in 1959, his widow, Norma Dent, acquired the radio, film, and television rights to Doc Savage.

=== Failed Goodson and Todman production ===
The production team of Mark Goodson and Bill Todman (best known for their many game show productions) announced the intention to produce a Doc Savage film to cash in on the popularity of the re-issued pulp novels by Bantam Books and the James Bond craze sweeping the movies. The film would be based on the July 1934 pulp novel The Thousand-Headed Man, with Chuck Connors as Doc, for a 1966 release. Unfortunately, the producers and Condé Nast Publications, the new copyright owner of the Doc Savage brand, failed to secure the film rights from the estate of Lester Dent. By the time the legal issues had been resolved, the production team and cast had moved on to do the offbeat western Ride Beyond Vengeance.

Only the one-shot comic book movie tie-in published by Gold Key, with cover artwork by James Bama, remains to mark this aborted film undertaking.

=== Development under George Pal ===
"I've always enjoyed browsing in book-stores," George Pal said later. "I kept noticing these stacks of Doc Savage paperbacks; every time I would come back to the store this stack would get smaller and smaller. When I found out more about this fantastic character I realized what a wonderful film this could make." In August 1971 George Pal announced he had secured the film and television rights to 181 Doc Savage novels from Norma Dent. Pal wanted to start production on a Doc Savage film by the end of the year. He said getting the rights involved "long and difficult negotiating."

Prior to filming Pal said "In the last six years the Doc Savage Bantam books, the reprints alone, have sold 11,400,000 copies. It's an awful lot of copies! Somebody buys them. I figure my audience are the people who read those books, plus I think we can create enough excitement about Doc Savage to attract the people who don't know about him. I'm sure we can get most of the kids, most of the science fiction fans, and most of the nostalgia buffs who remember Doc Savage."

Pal wanted to make "several Doc Savage pictures. After the first one is successful, we'll make another one, and then we'll sell the series to television. By that time, every network will fight for it. At least, that's my conviction."

Pal originally contacted Steve Reeves for the role of Doc Savage but when filming was about to begin a Hollywood writers strike put the film on hold, and Reeves and the original director were replaced.

In January 1974 Pal announced that Michael Anderson would direct the movie for Warner Bros. Pictures. The first movie would be Man of Bronze and the second film in the series - which had already been written - was Archenemy of Evil.

"With luck I will produce all 181 movies," said Pal. "The pictures will be pure escapism. But they will be well done because we take great pride in the rebirth of Doc Savage."

=== Writing ===
Pal said when they started they considered making The Man of Bronze, the first Doc Savage book but then decided to come up with their own story, Doc Savage The Arch Enemy of Evil. "We were going to make the best Doc Savage movie we could, the best story we could ever think of" and they combined several stories. However Pal says "When we finished the screenplay we discovered something: we don't know who Doc Savage is! Who were his parents? Why is he so wealthy? How did all this happen? And it was all there in The Man of Bronze." So they went back and wrote another screenplay based on Man of Bronze. It was decided that Arch Enemy would be the sequel.

Pal and Joe Morhaim wrote the screenplay based on The Man of Bronze, the first Doc Savage adventure, with additional story elements from other Doc Savage adventures, such as the November 1938 novel The Green Death and the January 1935 novel The Mystic Mullah. The villainous Captain Seas, played by Paul Wexler, was based on the flamboyant and brutal Captain Flamingo — unrelated to the Canadian television character of that name — from the February 1936 pulp novel Mystery Under the Sea.

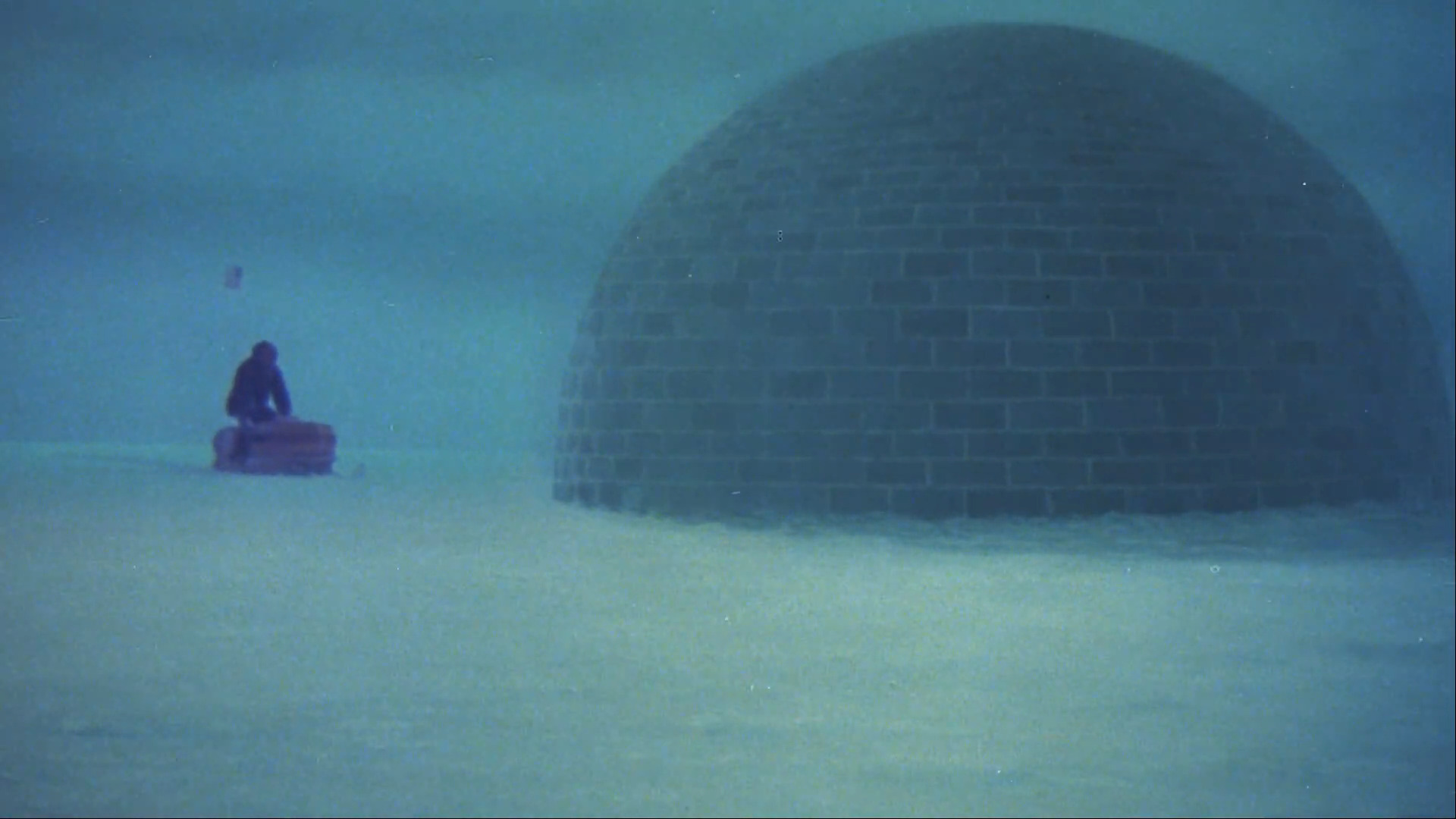
Ron Ely as Doc Savage and the Fortress of Solitude exterior (l-r)

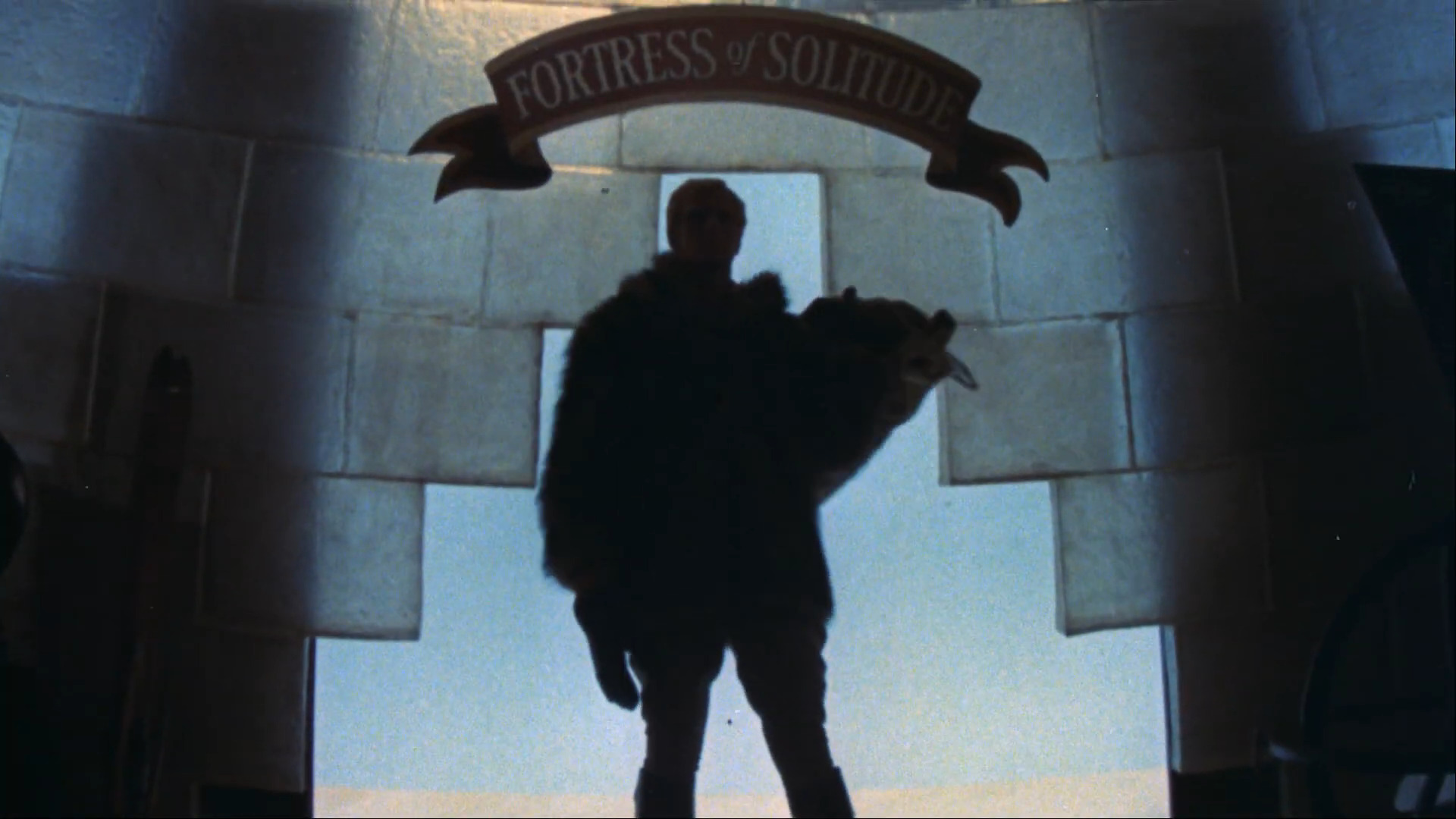
Ron Ely as Doc Savage and the Fortress of Solitude interior

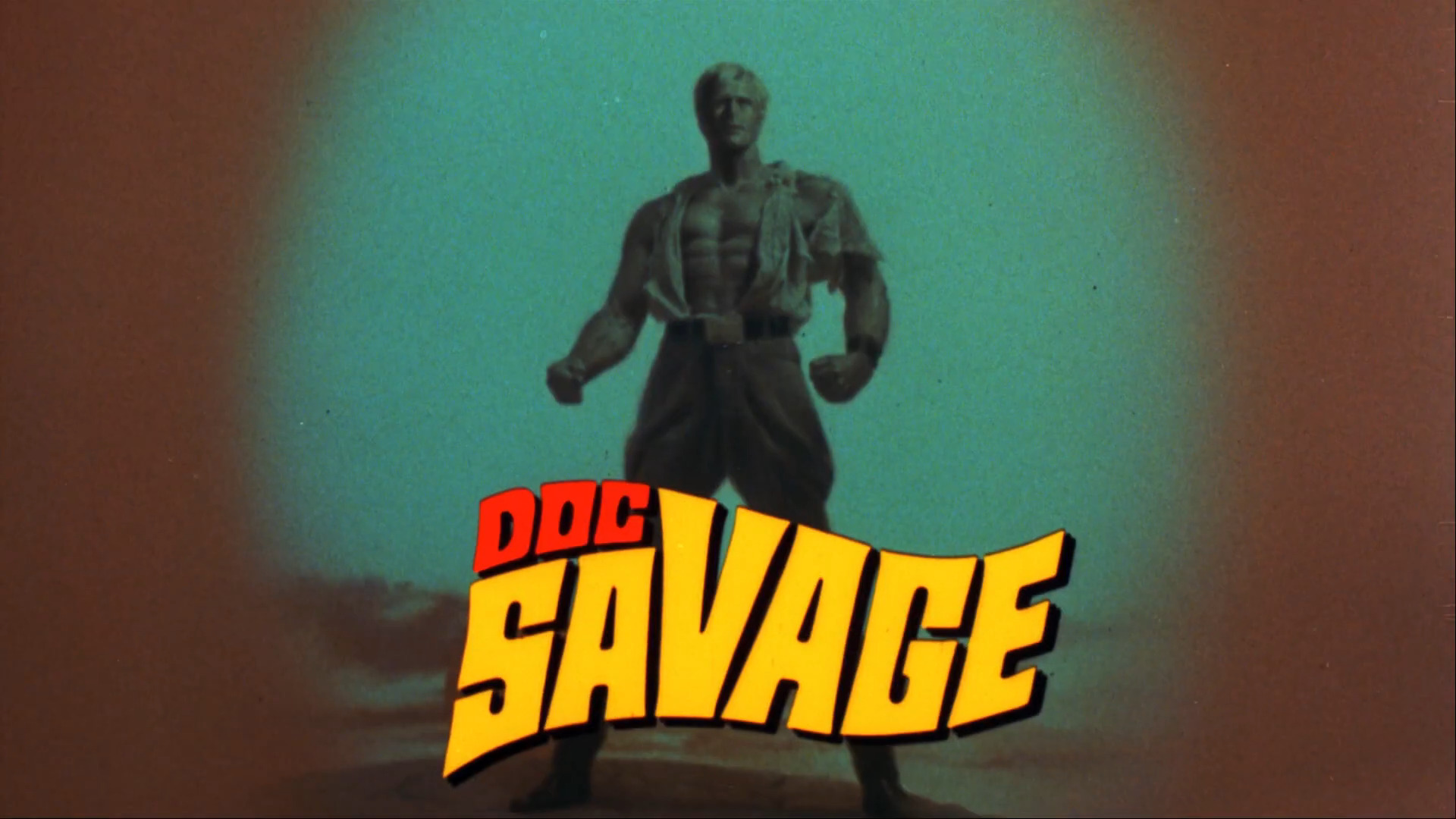
Doc Savage title logo

Pal kept the story a period tale. "We do it correctly, we don't hit it hard. We use much of the dialogue of Doc Savage, straight out of the books. It's wonderful. A bit campy today, but it's wonderful. It's honest. It's the way they talked." Pal did not want to set it in modern times because "You couldn't believe the Doc Savage code if somebody said it today. But coming from Ron Ely, and this proves what a great actor he is, you say: "I don't believe what he says, but I'm with him!" It shifts you back to a time when heroes were heroes and men were men. You can't help but be inspired by it."

Doc Savage: The Man of Bronze was fairly faithful to the novels and characters, which included such elements as:

- Doc's trilling (although it sounded like bells tinkling rather than a more lifelike trilling (such as a cat purring))
- Bickering between Monk and Ham
- Renny's signature expletive "Holy Cow!"
- Renny's love of slamming his fists through solidly constructed doors or door-panels.
- Monk's pet pig, Habeas Corpus
- Doc's Fortress of Solitude (pictured)
- The penthouse headquarters on the 86th floor of the Empire State Building.
- The Crime College and Doc's brain surgery techniques to remove the criminal element from crooks he'd captured, making them incapable of committing further crimes.
- Doc's dramatic descent down a skyscraper elevator shaft
- Doc's daily two-hour exercise regime
- Doc standing on an automobile's running board in hot pursuit.
- Johnny's use of long, obscure words when simple words would suffice.
- Johnny's signature expletive "I'll be superamalgamated!"
- A plethora of retro gadgetry such as heat detector, globes of fire-fighting chemicals (extinguisher globes), phonograph-based recording machine, remote-controlled aircraft, a ray gun disguised as a cigarette lighter, lightweight bullet-proof vests, miniaturized SCUBA-type underwater breathing gear, and the Whizzer, a prototype helicopter—all his inventions and designs.

Other aspects of the Doc Savage mythos were modified for the movie. For example, the film takes place in 1936, but the original pulp novel was published in March 1933. Most Doc Savage chronologies place the events in The Man of Bronze in early 1931 prior to the official opening of the Empire State Building, the implicit location of Doc's 86th floor penthouse headquarters. The film does not mention that Doc's father, Professor Clark Savage Sr., was instrumental in raising his son from the cradle to become the supreme adventurer under the tutelage of a blue-ribbon group of distinguished scientists. The Seven Seas is actually the name of Doc Savage's private motor yacht in the pulp novels written by Lester Dent. Finally, Long Tom (Paul Gleason) mentions that Monk, Ham, Renny, Johnny, and he first met Doc Savage while fighting in the trenches during World War I and vowed to work together against evil-doers after the war. Finally, the opening titles used the same typography (pictured) used in the Bantam Books reprints of the Doc Savage pulp novels.

Pal admired Michael Anderson and had tried to make Logan's Run with the director (Anderson ended up making it with another producer). Anderson came on board Doc Savage. "I like his style," said Pal. "He's a sensitive director. Working with him has been a joy and a pleasure. We went through the story very much in detail before finishing the script and pool lots of his ideas into it. "

"It's very hard to put something dirty into Doc Savage, or for that matter, real violence," said Pal. "We'll have a certain amount of sex...but we don't want to get him rolling around in bed. We won't have that. That's the only thing that makes a Bond picture GP rather than G, it's when they go overboard with sex. I don't think a little sex will offend. These are adventure movies. I want to be true to Doc Savage. He doesn't drink, he doesn't smoke, he's the arch-enemy of evil. I think people are ready for a real hero."

== Production ==
=== Casting ===
In January 1974 Pal said the actor who played Savage "must be an unknown. He must play the prototype hero. He has to be at least six foot one with blonde hair and bronze skin. Dent described him as having blue eyes with a glint of gold." Pal added "you'd be surprised at the number of big stars who have applied for a part."

By the end of that month Ron Ely had been cast. At the time Ely was best known for playing Tarzan on television; he says he had been typecast and was unable to find roles in the USA afterwards, so mostly worked in Europe.

Ron Ely's involvement extended beyond starring in the lead role. The portrait of Professor Clark Savage Sr., in Doc Savage's penthouse headquarters is Ely wearing a vintage safari outfit and pith helmet, with a handlebar moustache.

=== Filming ===
Filming began 23 January 1974. Principal photography was done in southern California. Scenes involving the fictitious Eastern Cranmoor Building in New York City were filmed underneath the clock tower of the art deco Eastern Columbia Building in downtown Los Angeles.

Pal said "I have been on the set practically all the way through, in order to pick up on anything that he may have missed or reversed. He welcomed it. because in that way he used me as a sounding board. I wouldn't mind Michael to direct every picture of mine because we work so well together. I couldn't have directed this picture myself because it wouldn't have been right for the project. As a producer. you must keep an overview. "

The film features a rare Cord Model 810 convertible coupe (license number NY 36 486–539) and a vintage Lockheed L-12A Electra aircraft, serial number 1203, original tail number NC16077, first registered to Continental Oil in 1936. The plane became famous as G-AFTL when flown by Sidney Cotton, who used it for spying on the Germans during World War Two. It was later owned by air-show pilot Art Scholl and flown in the 1976 two-part TV miniseries Amelia Earhart, the 1976 CBS-TV adventure series Spencer's Pilots, and the 1977 TV movie The Amazing Howard Hughes.

=== Style ===
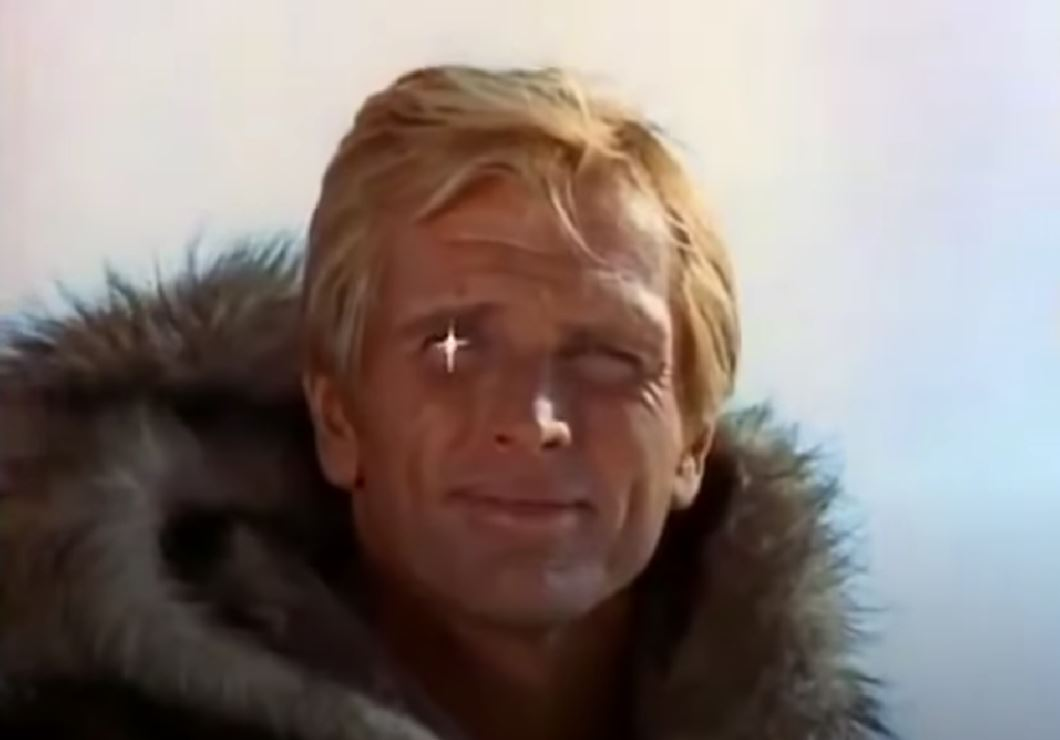
Opening scene

Debate continues as to who was responsible for the camp content of Doc Savage: The Man of Bronze, the studio or George Pal and his production team. Among the many examples of over-the-top camp element included:

- The diminutive Don Rubio Gorro (Bob Corso) rocking himself to sleep in an adult-sized baby crib, with Beautiful Dreamer as its musical cue
- The animated twinkle in the eye of Doc Savage (Ron Ely) at the beginning of the film (pictured) and later when Doc tells Mona (Pamela Hensley) that she was a brick.
- The use of La Cucaracha, played by a flute in an up-tempo musical cue, during the attempted escape of Captain Seas' henchmen from the Valley of the Vanished
- An applause soundtrack was added following Doc's recitation of his personal code prior to his departure for the Central American Republic of Hildago.

=== Music ===
The film is also remembered for its theme song arranged by Frank De Vol, based on John Philip Sousa's The Thunderer. Sousa's music was intended to evoke a patriotic theme for Doc Savage: The Man of Bronze and attempted to emulate the success that director George Roy Hill and composer Marvin Hamlisch had achieved when they used the ragtime music of Scott Joplin for the 1973 caper film The Sting. Both Sousa and Joplin were turn-of-the-century composers, and their music was not contemporaneous to the period that these 1930s nostalgia films were set. The credit acknowledging Sousa's score has the letters "USA" in his last name highlighted in red, white, and blue.

The soundtrack of George Pal's earlier film Houdini also made frequent use of The Thunderer.

== Reception ==
=== Critical ===
Prior to the film's release, a film buyer called it "unsellable, horrible – supposedly a camp movie about this character called Doc Savage, Man of Bronze. Just terrible. Ron Ely is in it, and he doesn't even take off his clothes."

Ely said "It looked ideal when they offered it to me, and the result was exactly the opposite. During the production, there was a change in studio heads; the new people didn't know how to sell it. I was stunned when I saw the finished product."

The film received negative reviews. Variety noted that, "Execrable acting, dopey action sequences, and clumsy attempts at camp humor mark George Pal's Doc Savage as the kind of kiddie film that gives the G rating a bad name."

The A.V. Club, looking back on the film in 2011, said the film "demonstrates none of the charm or thrills of Pal classics like The War of the Worlds (1953) or The Time Machine (1960). Savage is hampered by budget woes, weak acting, a sluggish script, and some painfully forced attempts at camp. It bombed at the box office, opening in June to be buried by Steven Spielberg's Jaws..."

Lester Dent's widow, Norma, said, "... I thought my heart would burst with pride. I saw the movie three times that day. I cried when I heard Ron Ely deliver the Doc Savage code - he said it as he meant every word of it. It was wonderful."

=== Awards ===
Doc Savage: The Man of Bronze received the 1974–1975 Golden Scroll for Best Fantasy Film from the Academy of Science Fiction, Fantasy & Horror Films.

== Home media ==
Doc Savage: The Man of Bronze was initially released in 1986 by Warner Home Video in a clamshell box, at the time denoting a family film, with cover art designed to capitalize on the success of Raiders of the Lost Ark. The film was also released onto Laserdisc and there is a DVD available in Germany (with German and English language).

In March 2009, the movie was made available within the United States as part of Warner Brothers's "Warner Archive" manufacture-on-demand DVD service, at a price of $19.95 for a DVD containing the movie presented in its original aspect ratio, and its trailer in 4:3.

Warner Archive later released the film on Blu-ray.

== Cancelled sequel ==
A sequel, Doc Savage: The Arch Enemy of Evil, was announced at the conclusion of The Man of Bronze. Based on a screenplay by Joe Morhaim, and according to contemporary news accounts, it had been filmed in the Lake Tahoe area simultaneously with the principal photography for the first Doc Savage. However, people associated with the production of the film have said only some publicity shots were taken at Tahoe. No filming was done.

Another treatment was written by fantasy author Philip José Farmer, and included a meeting between Doc and a retired Sherlock Holmes in 1936, but it was never filmed. Farmer said " I saw the movie before it was released. George Pal told me that the head of Warner Bros. at that time didn't like Doc Savage. I read the original script. It was much more complicated and costly than what he ended up with. One thing was the villain's yacht. He pressed the button, and it became a sailing vessel. You could disguise it. I had great hopes for the movie. Till I saw it! [Laughs.] Pal couldn't get anybody interested in a second one. So, the treatment went untreated!"

In December 1975 it was reported that Pal was reconfiguring the project as a TV series, but no series resulted.

== See also ==
- List of American films of 1975

== Sources ==
- Johnson, Dennis S.; Clarke, Frederick S.; Winogura, Dale (Fall 1974). "Doc Savage the Man of Bronze". Cinefantastique. Vol. 3, no. 3.
