= Cayden Boyd =

American actor (born 1994)

- Born: Cayden Michael Boyd; May 24, 1994 (age 32); Bedford, Texas, U.S.
- Education: Pepperdine University
- Occupation: Actor
- Years active: 2001–present
- Spouse: Madeline Mills (m. 2025)
- Children: 1
- Relatives: Jenna Boyd (sister)

Cayden Michael Boyd (born May 24, 1994) is an American actor. He is best known for his child roles as Max in Robert Rodriguez's 2005 film The Adventures of Sharkboy and Lavagirl and Ben Reynolds in the 2007 film Have Dreams, Will Travel.

== Early life ==
Cayden Michael Boyd was born on May 24, 1994, in Bedford, Texas. His older sister, Jenna, is also an actress. Boyd plays violin and cello and played high school football at Village Christian School. He graduated from Pepperdine University in 2016, studying business.

== Career ==
Boyd landed his first roles, small television roles and commercials, as young as 6 and 7. He played Tim Robbins's son in Mystic River. In 2004, he was cast in the starring role of Max in the 2005 film The Adventures of Sharkboy and Lavagirl. He played young Warren Worthington III in X-Men: The Last Stand, and he was cast in the lead role in the 2007 film Have Dreams, Will Travel (originally titled A West Texas Children’s Story). He appeared on episodes of such television series as Crossing Jordan, Cold Case, Close to Home and Scrubs. In 2008, he appeared alongside Julia Roberts and Willem Dafoe in Fireflies in the Garden. In 2015 Boyd also had a role on the television series Awkward playing Jenna's Marine boyfriend.

== Filmography ==
=== Film ===
Year	Film	Role	Notes
2002	Fault	Young Mark	
2003	Freaky Friday	Harry's Friend #2	
2003	Mystic River	Michael Boyle	
2003	Exposed	Jared	
2004	Envy	Boy #2 at play (wolf)	
2004	Dodgeball: A True Underdog Story	Timmy	
2005	The Adventures of Sharkboy and Lavagirl	Max	
2006	X-Men: The Last Stand	Young Warren Worthington III	Cameo
2007	Have Dreams, Will Travel	Ben Reynolds	
2008	Fireflies in the Garden	Young Michael	
2022	Dog	Corporal Levitz	

=== Television ===
Year	Film	Role	Notes
2001	Scrubs	Hummer	Episode: "My Fifteen Minutes"; uncredited
2002	Taina	Little Boy	Episodes: "Test Friends", "Papi Don't Preach"
2002	The King of Queens	Lil Jared	Episode: "Kirbed Enthusiasm"
2004	Century City	Timmy / Toby Clemens	Episodes: "A Mind Is a Terrible Thing to Lose", "The Face Was Familiar"
2004	Crossing Jordan	Kyle Moran	Episode: "Fire in the Sky"
2005	Cold Case	Kyle Bream 1998	Episode: "Revenge"
2005	Close to Home	Sonny	Episode: Pilot
2005	Night Stalker	Ryan	Episode: "Malum"
2010	Past Life	Noah Powell	Episode: Pilot
2014	Expecting Amish	Isaac	Television film
2014–2015	Awkward	Brian	3 episodes
2017	The Mick	Matty Pruitt	Episode: "The Haunted House"
2018	Heathers	Ram Sweeney	4 episodes
2018	NCIS	First Lt. Danny Hall	Episode: "Fragments"
2021	Good Girls	Young Dean	Episode: "Fall Guy"
2022	The First Lady	Michael Ford	
2024	Going Home	Mario	5 episodes

== Awards and nominations ==
Year	Award	Category	Work	Result	Ref
2003	Young Artist Award	Best Performance in a Commercial	McDonald's	Nominated	
