= Ron Ely =

American actor and novelist (1938–2024)

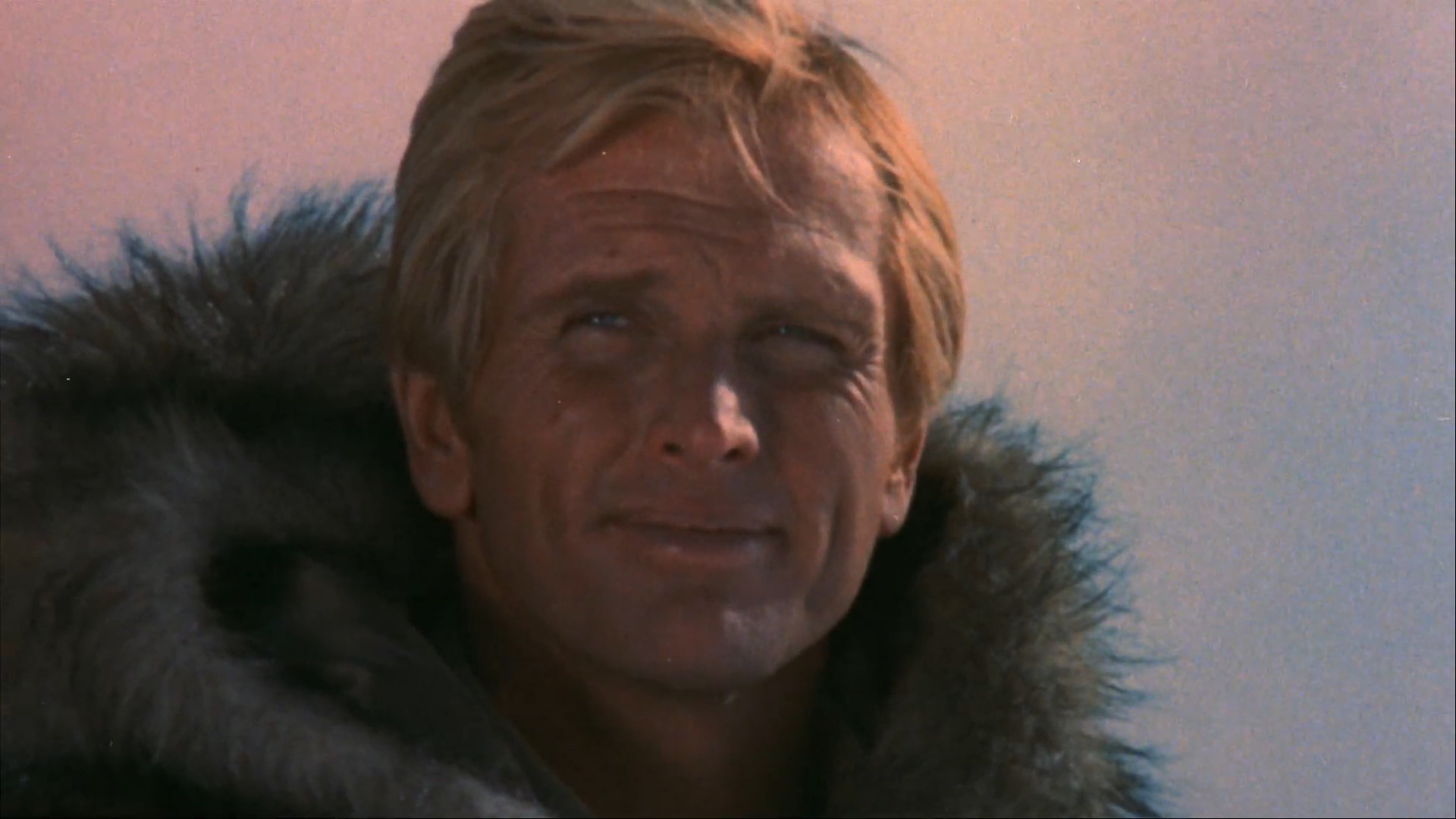
- Ely as Doc Savage in 1975
- Born: Ronald Pierce Ely; June 21, 1938; Hereford, Texas, US
- Died: September 29, 2024 (aged 86); Los Alamos, California, US
- Occupations: Actor; novelist
- Years active: 1957–2001, 2014
- Spouses: Helen Janet Triplet (m. 1959; div. 1961) Valerie Lundeen (m. 1984; died 2019)
- Children: 3

Ronald Pierce Ely (June 21, 1938 – September 29, 2024) was an American actor and novelist, best known for portraying Tarzan in the 1966–1968 NBC series Tarzan and playing the lead role in the film Doc Savage: The Man of Bronze (1975). He hosted the Miss America pageant telecast in 1980 and 1981.

== Career ==
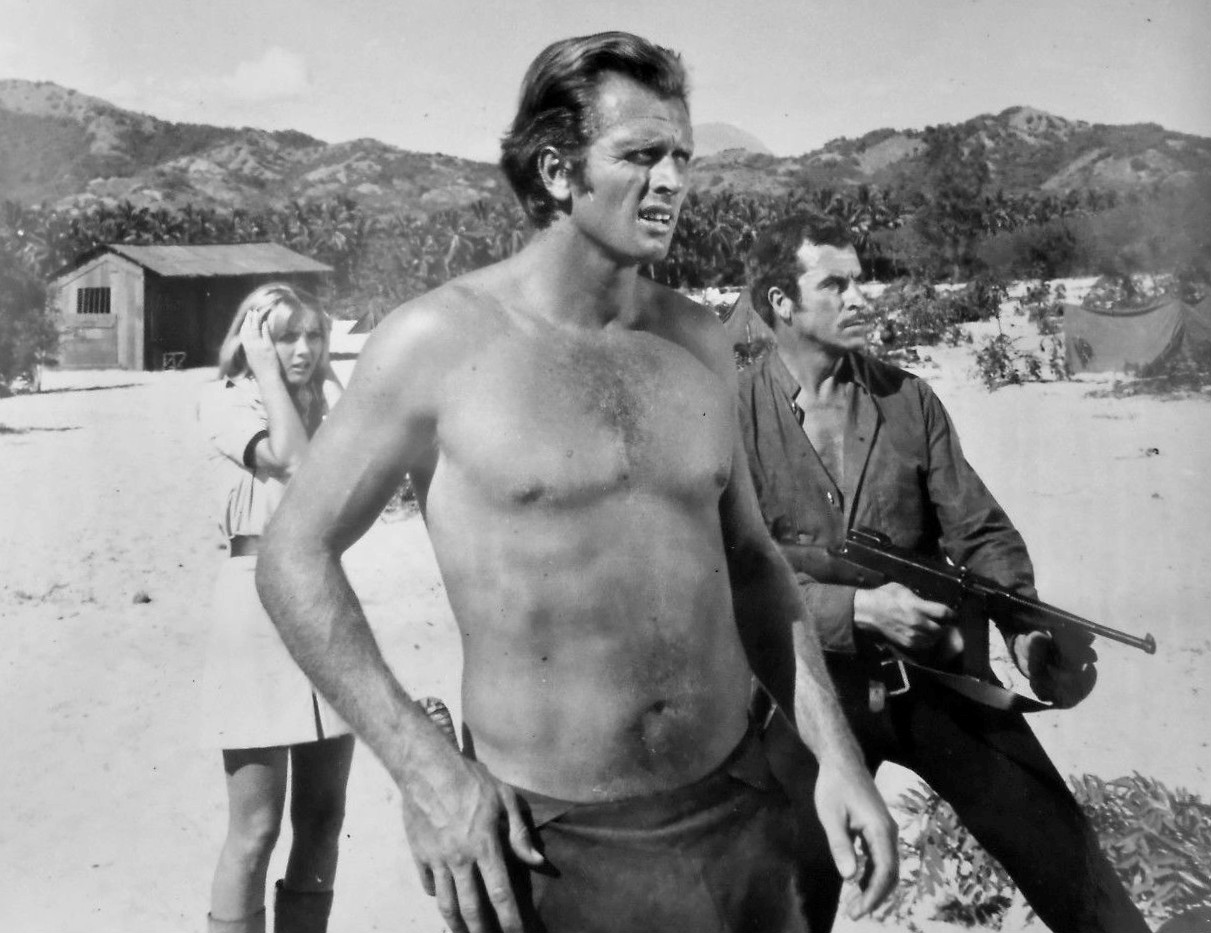
Ely as Tarzan

Ely won the role of Tarzan in 1966 after playing supporting roles in films such as South Pacific (1958), as an airplane navigator, The Fiend Who Walked the West (1958) and The Remarkable Mr. Pennypacker (1959).

During the filming of Tarzan, Ely did almost all of his own stunts, and received over two dozen injuries, including two broken shoulders and several lion bites.

During the first week of July 1969, Ely, who had recently wrapped up his work as television's Tarzan (1966 TV series), starred in a production of "The Teahouse of the August Moon" at the Little Theatre on the Square in Sullivan, Illinois. He was also hired to serve as grand marshal for the Fourth of July parade in nearby Champaign-Urbana, Illinois; during the parade, spotting a nine-year-old boy on crutches on the sidewalk, Ely swiftly alighted from his convertible to chat with the boy, Fernando Gonzalez Sfeir, who grew up to be a medical doctor and surgeon, jungle explorer and benefactor of The National Geographic Society.

Ely's height (6'4") and athletic build also won him the title role in the film Doc Savage: The Man of Bronze (1975), as well as various guest shots. He was in five episodes of the series Fantasy Island; in one, in 1978, he portrayed Mark Antony in a Roman military short tunic and breastplate and starred in the Wonder Woman two-part episode, "The Deadly Sting".

Ely starred on the series The Aquanauts in 1960–1961, in the western adventure film The Night of the Grizzly (1966) opposite Clint Walker, and later appeared in Jürgen Goslar's slavery movie Slavers (1978). In the 1980s, he hosted the musical game show Face the Music, as well as the 1980 and 1981 Miss America Pageants, replacing longtime host Bert Parks. He starred in a 1987–1988 revival of the 1960s adventure series Sea Hunt as Mike Nelson, the role played by Lloyd Bridges in the original series.

In the 1990s, Ely's roles included a retired alternate universe variant of Superman in the Superboy episode "The Road to Hell", and hunter Gordon Shaw in the Tarzán episode "Tarzan the Hunted". Until about 2001, he appeared on such shows as Sheena and Renegade. He wrote two mystery novels featuring private investigator Jake Sands: Night Shadows (1994) and East Beach (1995).

Ely retired from acting in 2001, returning with an appearance in the television film Expecting Amish (2014).

== Personal life and death ==
Ely was born in Hereford, Texas on June 21, 1938, and raised in Amarillo. He married his high school sweetheart, Helen Janet Triplet, in 1959. Both natives of Hereford, Texas, they divorced in July 1961.

In 1984, Ely married Valerie Lundeen, who won the Miss Florida USA title in 1981, and they had three children.

=== Murder of wife and death of son ===
On October 15, 2019, Ely's son Cameron, 30 years old, stabbed Valerie Ely to death at the family's home in Hope Ranch, California, a coastal residential community in Santa Barbara. Police officers were called to the scene for a "family disturbance" and killed Cameron Ely, claiming he posed a threat to officers.

The Santa Barbara district attorney ruled the police shooting a justifiable homicide. No charges were filed, and an attorney representing Ely disputed the police account of Cameron's death. An autopsy found Cameron was in the early stages of chronic traumatic encephalopathy before he died.

=== Death ===
Ely died at the home of one of his daughters in Los Alamos, California, on September 29, 2024, at age 86. His death was not announced until October 23, 2024.

== Filmography ==
=== Film ===
Year	Title	Role	Notes
1958	South Pacific	Navigator	
1958	The Fiend Who Walked the West	Deputy Jim Dyer	
1959	The Remarkable Mr. Pennypacker	Wilbur Fielding	
1966	The Night of the Grizzly	Tad Curry	
1966	Once Before I Die	Soldier	
1972	Der Schrei der schwarzen Wölfe	Bill Robinson	
1972	Alleluja & Sartana are Sons... Sons of God	Hallelujah	
1975	Doc Savage: The Man of Bronze	Clark Savage Jr. aka Doc	
1976	MitGift	Dr. Kurt Jahn	
1978	Slavers	Steven Hamilton	
1981	The Seal		
2014	Expecting Amish	Elder Miller	

=== Television ===
Year	Title	Role	Notes
1959	Father Knows Best	Jerry Preston	Episode: "Crisis Over a Kiss"
1959	Steve Canyon	Pete Randall	Episode: "The Sergeant"
1959	Playhouse 90	Buddy	Episode: "The Second Happiest Day"
1959	How to Marry a Millionaire	Philip Jackson	Episode: "The Method"
1959	The Millionaire	Jim Phillips	Episode: "Millionaire Sergeant Matthew Brogan"
1959	The Many Loves of Dobie Gillis	Dobie's Older Brother	Episode: "Pilot"
1960	The Life and Legend of Wyatt Earp	Arleigh Smith	Episode: "The Posse"
1961	The Aquanauts	Mike Madison	18 episodes
1962	Thriller	Lt. Mike Hudson	Episode: "Waxworks"
1966–1968	Tarzan	Tarzan	57 episodes
1969	The Courtship of Eddie's Father	Ronald	Episode: "Pain"
1971	Ironside	Scott Bradley	Episode: "A Killing at the Track"
1974	Marcus Welby, M.D.	Ben Brecht	Episode: "To Father a Child"
1978	Wonder Woman	Bill Michaels	Episode: "The Deadly Sting"
1979–1984	Fantasy Island	Fred Spenser / Burt Hunter / Kevin Lansing Eric Williams / Marc Anthony / Baron Manfred von Richthofen	5 episodes
1980–1981	Face The Music	Host	Main role
1980–1981	The Love Boat	Ted Cole / Jim / Steve Swaggart / Darryl Brewster	3 episodes
1983	Matt Houston	Winston Fowler	Episode: "A Deadly Parlay"
1983	Hotel	Evan Paige	Episode: "Charades"
1987	Sea Hunt	Mike Nelson	22 episodes
1991	Superboy	Alternate Superman	Episode: "The Road to Hell"
1992	Tarzán	Gordon Shaw	Episode: "Tarzan, the Hunted"
1992	The Hat Squad	Carl Strong	Episode: "Family Business"
1993	L.A. Law		Episode: "Book of Renovation"
1993–1994	Renegade	Gen. Howard Bird / Reverend McClain	2 episodes
1994	Hawkeye	Harry March	Episode: "Out of the Past"
2001	Sheena	Bixby	Episode: "The Feral King"
