= 1933 in comics =

Notable events of 1933 in comics.

== Events and publications ==
=== January ===
- January 2: In Ernie Bushmiller's Fritzi Ritz the character Nancy makes her debut. She will eventually become the protagonist of the series.
- January 8; Dippy Dog (an early version of Goofy) makes his comics debut in a Sunday table, drawn by Floyd Gottfredson and written by Webb Smith.

=== February ===
- February 27: first strip of Mickey Mouse the mail pilot, by Floyd Gottfredson and Ted Obsborne; debut of the mechanic Gloomy and of the captain Dobermann, two recurring Mickey’s supporting characters in the Thirties.

=== April ===
- April 17: Orhan Halil Tolon publishes Zıpzıp Ali'nin Serüvenleri (The Adventures of Ali the Hopper).
- Printer Eastern Color Printing makes its first foray into comic book publishing with Gulf Comic Weekly #1. The comic is 10 ½" x 15", and is advertised on national radio. All four pages contained one-page, full color comic strips. The tabloids are grabbed up as fast as Gulf Oil service stations can offer them. Gulf Comic Weekly is soon changed to Gulf Funny Weekly, and distribution shoots up to 3 million copies a week. The series runs as a tabloid until 1939 and runs for 422 issues until May 23, 1941. Around the same time, Eastern also prints another four-page tabloid for Standard Oil, titled Standard Oil Comics.
- Eastern Color Printing makes its second foray into comic book publishing with Funnies on Parade.

=== May ===
- May 11: First issue of the Italian comics magazine Il Monello. It will run until 12 October 1990.

=== July ===
- July 7: Pedrito Reyes and Francisco Reyes' Kulafu makes his debut.
- July 14: Premier of the Fleischer Studios' Betty Boop animated short Popeye the Sailor, which introduces Popeye as an animated character. It will lead to his own animated film series which will increase the popularity of Popeye's comics by E.C. Segar all across the world.
- July 16: The final episode of Tack Knight's Little Folks is published.
- July 23: Stanley Link's Tiny Tim makes its debut. It will run until 2 March 1958.
- July 24: In E.C. Segar's newspaper comic strip Thimble Theatre Popeye and Olive Oyl's adopted child Swee'Pea makes her debut.
- July 30: Roy Crane's Captain Easy makes its newspaper debut and will run until 1988.
- July 31: Milton Caniff's Dickie Dare makes its debut.

=== August ===
- August 9: Wiley Padan's newspaper cartoon panel It's True, with trivia about Hollywood films and actors, is first published and will run until his death in 1947.
- August 21: Clarence Gray and William Ritt's comics series Brick Bradford makes its debut.

=== September ===
- September 25: Norman W. Marsh and Allen Saunders' Dan Dunn makes its debut. It will run for over a decade.

=== October ===
- October 1:
  - Zack Mosley's The Adventures of Smilin' Jack makes its newspaper debut.
  - Ed Leffingwell's Little Joe makes its debut. It will run until 1972.
  - Al Posen's Sweeney & Son first appears in the papers. It will run until 1960.
- October 30: Feg Murray's Seein' Stars, a comic strip with trivia about Hollywood stars, makes its debut.

=== December ===
- December 10: In E.C. Segar's newspaper comic strip Thimble Theatre Alice the Goon makes her debut.

=== Specific date unknown ===
- Francisco Darnis' Nick, Pecho de Hiero debuts.

== Births ==
=== January ===
- January 13: Ron Goulart, American comics writer (wrote scripts for Marvel Comics, Star Hawks and TekWar), author and historian (The Adventurous Decade: Comic Strips in the Thirties, Comic Book Culture: An Illustrated History, The Great Comic Book Artists, Focus on Jack Cole, Ron Goulart's Great History of Comic Books, The Encyclopedia of American Comics, The Comic Book Reader's Companion, Masked Marvels and Jungle Queens: Great Comic Book Covers of the '40s, The Funnies: 100 Years of American Comic Strips, Comic Book Encyclopedia: The Ultimate Guide to Characters, Graphic Novels, Writers and Artists in the Comic Book Universe, Alex Raymond: An Artistic Journey, Adventure, Intrigue and Romance), (d. 2022).

=== July ===
- July 3: Carmen Barbará, Spanish comics artist and illustrator (Mary Noticias),
- July 31: Nico Visscher, Dutch cartoonist and comics artist (De Wolken, Korrel), (d. 2021).

=== September ===
- September 20: Tony Tallarico, American comic artist (Lobo, Great Society Comic Book, Bobman and Teddy, Jigsaw), (d. 2022).

=== December ===
- December 9: José Delbo, Argentine comics artist (Wonder Woman, The Transformers, (d. 2024).
- December 20: Marcel Uderzo, French comics artist (Les Mémoires de Mathias, drew a comic strip based on The Twelve Tasks of Asterix, assisted on his brother Albert Uderzo's Tanguy et Laverdure and Astérix), (d. 2021).

== Deaths ==
=== February ===
- February 15: Pat Sullivan, Australian-American animator, film producer and comics artist (Felix the Cat), dies at age 47 from pneumonia.

=== April ===
- April 1: Joaquín Xaudaró, Spanish cartoonist, caricaturist, illustrator and animator, dies at age 60.

=== May ===
- May 13: William James Sinnott, American comics artist (Vivian and Viola, Dicky Dippy's Diary), dies at age 57.

=== June ===
- June 1: Louis Leynia de La Jarrige, French illustrator (made picture stories), dies at age 59.

=== August ===
- August 10: Henry Maigrot, a.k.a. Henriot, French caricaturist, cartoonist, illustrator and comics artist (Le Petit Chaperon Rouge), dies at age 76.

=== September ===
- September 19: E. W. Kemble, American illustrator and comics artist (Mammy's Li'l Lamb), dies at age 72.

=== October ===
- October 29: George Luks, American painter, illustrator and comics artist (continued Hogan's Alley), dies in a bar brawl at age 66.

=== November ===
- November 12: Petter Lindroth, a.k.a. Per Lindroth, Swedish illustrator and comics artist (Jocke, Nicke, Majken, Pelle och Kickan), dies at age 44.

=== Specific date unknown ===
- Albert-Samuel Brodeur, Canadian illustrator and comics artist (Francine et Graindesel), dies at age 70 or 71.
- Alfred Leete, British illustrator, poster designer and comics artist (Schmidt the Spy, Bosch), dies at age 50 or 51.
