= Expecting Amish =

- Written by: Samantha DiPippo; Scott Durdan
- Directed by: Richard Gabai
- Starring: AJ Michalka; Jesse McCartney; Alyson Stoner; Cayden Boyd; Aurelia Scheppers; Avery Kristen Pohl
- Music by: Sean Murray
- Country of origin: United States
- Original language: English

Production
- Producers: Michael Amato; John Constantine; Richard Gabai
- Cinematography: Scott Peck
- Editor: Jeff Murphy
- Running time: 120 minutes
- Production company: Check Entertainment

Original release
- Network: Lifetime
- Release: July 19, 2014

Expecting Amish is a 2014 American television drama film produced and directed by Richard Gabai. It stars AJ Michalka, Jesse McCartney, Alyson Stoner, Cayden Boyd, Aurelia Scheppers, and Avery Kristen Pohl. It also featured Ron Ely in his first acting role since 2001, and his last performance before his death in 2024.

== Plot ==
Hannah Yoder, an 18-year-old raised in an Amish community near Lancaster, Pennsylvania, is about to be baptized into the Amish church and marry Samuel, the young man others had chosen for her to wed. Friends talk her into going on a Rumspringa, a time when some Amish youth briefly live away from the community to learn more about the outside world before joining the church.

Hannah and some of her friends go to Hollywood and, at first, she does not want to wear different clothing or go to parties. But then she meets Josh, who is finishing his college studies and working part time as a DJ. Hannah and Josh fall in love, and he asks her to stay in California to be with him. She agrees, but says she needs to go back to Pennsylvania to say goodbye to her family and her fiancé, Samuel.

Once back home Hannah falls back into Amish life, and wonders if she should stay. She finds out that she is pregnant, and tells Samuel, who states he will say that the baby is his. They must be baptized right away, and then marry. Hannah telephones Josh to tell him she is not returning to him, and that she is pregnant and will marry Samuel.

Josh drives cross county to try and convince Hannah to return to California with him. She is torn between Samuel and Josh, but in the end chooses to start a new life with Josh. The film ends with Hannah’s father receiving a letter saying that Hannah had given birth to a girl, who was named after Hannah’s deceased mother.

== Cast ==
- AJ Michalka as Hannah Yoder
- Jesse McCartney as Josh
- Alyson Stoner as Mary
- Cayden Boyd as Isaac
- Aurelia Scheppers as Sarah
- Avery Kristen Pohl as Beth
- Jean-Luc Bilodeau as Samual
- Brian Krause as Mr. Yoder
- Ron Ely as Elder Miller
- Micah Tayloe Owens as Gabe
- Carrie Wampler as Jennifer

== Release ==
The film premiered on Lifetime Network on July 19, 2014, by Check Entertainment.
